= American Revolution =

Founding of the United States

- Part of the Atlantic Revolutions, and the Age of Revolution
- The Continental Union Flag (1775–1777)

- The Committee of Five presenting its draft of the Declaration of Independence to the Second Continental Congress in Philadelphia on June 28, 1776, depicted in John Trumbull's 1818 portrait, Declaration of Independence
- Date: 1765 to 1783
- Location: Thirteen Colonies (1765–1775) United Colonies (1775–1776) United States (1776–ca.1800)
- Outcome: Independence of the United States of America from the Kingdom of Great Britain; Dissolution of British America, establishment of British North America and Spanish Florida; Dissolution of the First British Empire, establishment of the Second British Empire; Beginning of the Age of Revolution; World's first federal republic founded on the consent of the governed; First permanently successful overthrow of monarchical colonial rule

The American Revolution (1765–1789) was a political movement in the Thirteen Colonies of Great Britain. It began as a colonial rebellion and evolved into a revolution, the result of which was the creation of the United States following the colonies' victory in the American Revolutionary War (1775–1783) and British recognition of their sovereign independence in the Treaty of Paris. The Second Continental Congress, as the provisional government, established the Continental Army and appointed George Washington as its commander-in-chief in 1775. In May 1776, Congress voted to suppress all forms of Crown authority, to be replaced by locally created authority, and each state created a constitution. The Congress passed the Lee Resolution for independence on July 2 and unanimously adopted the Declaration of Independence on July 4 arguing for the separation based on "inalienable rights". The individual member states together created a shared sovereignty under the Articles of Confederation to facilitate international affairs and the promulgation of the war. Throughout most of the conflict the outcome appeared uncertain, but a decisive 1781 victory by combined French and Continental Army forces commanded by Washington in the Siege of Yorktown led King George III and the Fox–North coalition in government to negotiate the cessation of British colonial rule, and the acknowledgment of American sovereignty. A more centralized federal republic was created with the passage of the Constitution of the United States that took effect in 1789, and the Bill of Rights was ratified in 1791.

Discontent with British colonial rule began shortly after the end of the French and Indian War in 1763. Although the Thirteen Colonies had fought and supported the war directly, the British Parliament imposed new taxes on the colonists, ostensibly to compensate for wartime costs, and transferred control of the colonies' western lands to British officials in Montreal. In 1765, Representatives from several colonies held the Stamp Act Congress in New York City, resulting in the Declaration of Rights and Grievances, which argued that taxation without representation, among other British policies, violated their rights as Englishmen. The Stamp Act was repealed in 1767, but tensions increased again following Parliament's passage of the Townshend Acts. In an effort to quell the mounting rebellion, King George III deployed British troops to the colony of Massachusetts, which resulted in the Boston Massacre in 1770. In December 1773, a local faction of the Sons of Liberty orchestrated the Boston Tea Party, during which they dumped chests of taxed tea owned by the British East India Company into Boston Harbor. Parliament responded by enacting a series of punitive laws, called the Intolerable Acts. These were intended to end self-government in Massachusetts, but instead increased American support for revolution.

In 1774, twelve of the Thirteen Colonies sent delegates to the First Continental Congress (the Province of Georgia joined in 1775) in order to begin coordinating Patriot resistance. In August 1775, King George III proclaimed Massachusetts to be in rebellion. The British subsequently attempted to disarm the colonists, resulting in the Battles of Lexington and Concord and starting the Revolutionary War. The Second Continental Congress convened in May 1775 and created the Continental Army, which soon laid siege to Boston and forced the British to withdraw by sea in March 1776. On July 2, the Congress passed the Lee Resolution, affirming their support for joint independence. On July 4, 1776, they unanimously adopted the Declaration of Independence.

The Revolutionary War continued for another seven years, with France and Spain eventually entering. On September 28, 1781, Washington commanded the Continental Army's capture of a British army under General Cornwallis at the Siege of Yorktown, leading to the collapse of King George's control of Parliament. Consensus in Parliament soon shifted to the war ending on American terms. On September 3, 1783, the British signed the Treaty of Paris, recognizing the sovereign independence of the United States, and ceding to the new nation nearly all the territory east of the Mississippi River and south of the Great Lakes. The United States became the first nation to establish a federal republic with a written constitution based on the principles of universal natural rights, consent of the governed, and equality under the law, although with significant democratic limitations compared to later evolution of the concept.

== Origins ==
After the Glorious Revolution in England, the British had adopted a strict trade policy of "salutary neglect," whereby the Thirteen Colonies were largely left to govern themselves. As a result of this new policy, as well as the ideals of liberty which had been borne out of the Glorious Revolution, there emerged new government systems (as exemplified by William Penn's Frame of Government of Pennsylvania and the Massachusetts Charter of 1691); religious institutions (as exemplified by the democratic nature of Congregational Protestantism in New England and the First Great Awakening across the colonies); and occasionally, attitudes towards slavery (as exemplified by Massachusetts and, at least initially, Georgia banning the practice), although the latter of these was less common. This British policy reverted significantly after the French and Indian War. The British political establishment, especially after taking massive swathes of land from the former territories of New France, pursued a policy of greater control over colonial affairs, prompting the Thirteen Colonies to seek restoration of greater autonomy from Britain. One Patriot, Capt. Levi Preston of Danvers, Massachusetts, was asked why the Americans rebelled against England, and he responded: "...we always had governed ourselves, and we always meant to. They didn't mean we should."

=== 1651–1763: Evolution of colonial policy ===
==== Development of colonial self-government ====
A 1775 map of Eastern North America, including the Province of Quebec, the Thirteen Colonies on the Atlantic Coast, and the Indian Reserve as defined by the Royal Proclamation of 1763. The border between the red and pink areas represents the 1763 Proclamation line, and the orange area represents Spanish colonial claims.

The Thirteen Colonies were established in the 17th century originally as part of the English Empire and later as part of the British Empire after the union of England and Scotland in 1707.

The development of a unique American identity can be traced back to the English Civil War (1642–1651) and its aftermath. In that period the Puritan colonies of New England supported the Commonwealth government responsible for the execution of King Charles I. After the Stuart Restoration of 1660, Massachusetts did not recognize Charles II as the legitimate king for more than a year after his coronation. In King Philip's War (1675–1678), the New England colonies fought a coalition of a few American Indian tribes without military assistance from England, thereby contributing to the development of a uniquely American identity separate from that of the British identity.

In the 1680s, Charles and his brother, James II, attempted to bring New England under direct English control. The colonists fiercely opposed this, and the Crown nullified their colonial charters in response. In 1686, James finalized these efforts by consolidating the separate New England colonies along with New York and New Jersey into the Dominion of New England. Edmund Andros was appointed royal governor and tasked with governing the new Dominion under his direct rule. Colonial assemblies and town meetings were restricted, new local taxes were levied, and rights were abridged. Dominion rule triggered bitter resentment throughout New England. When James tried to rule without Parliament, the English aristocracy removed him from power in the Glorious Revolution of 1688. This was followed by the 1689 Boston revolt, which overthrew Dominion rule. Colonial governments reasserted their control after the revolt. The new monarchs, William and Mary, granted new charters to the individual New England colonies.

After the Glorious Revolution, the British Empire became a constitutional monarchy with sovereignty in the King-in-Parliament. Aristocrats inherited seats in the House of Lords, while the gentry and merchants controlled the elected House of Commons. The king ruled through cabinet ministers who depended on majority support in the Commons to govern effectively. British subjects on both sides of the Atlantic proudly claimed that the unwritten British constitution, with its guarantees of the rights of Englishmen, protected personal liberty better than any other government.

The British constitution served as the model for colonial governments. The Crown appointed a royal governor in each colony to exercise executive power, usually also appointing a Governor's Council largely to act as an unelected upper chamber of the legislature. Property owners elected a colonial assembly amongst themselves with powers to legislate and levy taxes, but the British government reserved the right to veto colonial legislation.

The British government lacked the resources and information necessary for close supervision of the colonies. Instead, British officials negotiated and compromised with colonial leaders to gain compliance with imperial policies. The colonies defended themselves with provincial troops and colonial militias of locals, and the British government rarely sent military forces to America before 1755. According to historian Robert Middlekauff, "Americans had become almost completely self-governing" before the American Revolution, a practice that was consistent with the British monarchy's practice of salutary neglect.

==== Mercantilism ====
British colonial policy was based on mercantilist theory, which held that Britain's national security depended on building a self-sufficient empire and controlling key trade routes. The purpose of colonies was to produce raw materials for Britain's use, consume British manufactures, and support the growth of British shipping. In the 1600s, the English Parliament enacted a series of laws called the Navigation Acts to ensure that the colonies fulfilled these purposes.

The Navigation Acts restricted colonial trade with foreign countries. The Thirteen Colonies could trade with the rest of the empire but only ship certain commodities like tobacco to Britain. Any European imports bound for British America had to first pass through an English port and pay customs duties. Other laws regulated developing colonial industries to prevent competition with British industries, such as the Wool Act 1698, the Hat Act 1731, and the Iron Act 1750. With little industry except shipbuilding, the colonies exported agricultural products in return for manufactured goods. They also imported molasses, rum, and sugar from the British West Indies.

Colonial reactions to these policies were mixed. The Molasses Act 1733, for example, placed a duty of six pence per gallon upon foreign molasses imported into the colonies. This act was particularly egregious to the New England colonists, who protested it as unconstitutional taxation without representation in the British parliament. The act increased the smuggling of foreign molasses, and the British government ceased enforcement efforts after the 1740s.

On the other hand, certain merchants and local industries benefited from the restrictions on foreign competition. The limits on foreign-built ships greatly benefited the colonial shipbuilding industry, particularly in New England. Some argue that the economic impact was minimal on the colonists, but the political friction that the acts triggered was more serious, as the merchants most directly affected were also the most politically active.

==== British military presence after 1754 ====
During the French and Indian War (1754–1763), the British government fielded 45,000 soldiers, half British Regulars and half colonial volunteers. The colonies also contributed funds and materiel to the war effort; though, two-fifths of this spending was reimbursed by the British government. Great Britain defeated France and acquired that nation's territory east of the Mississippi River.

In order to allow approximately 1,500 politically well-connected British Army officers to remain on active duty in America with full pay after the war, the Bute ministry decided in early 1763 to permanently garrison 10,000 soldiers in North America. Due to long-established English resistance to a standing army, stationing these officers in Great Britain during peacetime was a politically unacceptable alternative. The excuse made for a standing army in America was defense against French troops stationed in the West Indies, and foreign populations in newly acquired territories (the French in Canada and the Spanish in Florida). In addition, British soldiers were supposed to help collect customs duties and prevent colonists from instigating conflict with Native Americans.

Instead, increased British migration beyond the Appalachian Mountains and Native American anger over the policies of General Jeffery Amherst caused Pontiac's War (1763–1766). In response, the Grenville ministry issued the Royal Proclamation of 1763, designating the territory between the Appalachian Mountains and the Mississippi River an Indian Reserve closed to colonial settlement. The Proclamation angered settlers, fur traders, and land speculators; however, it failed to stop westward migration.

=== 1764–1766: Sugar Act and Stamp Act Crisis leads to organized resistance ===
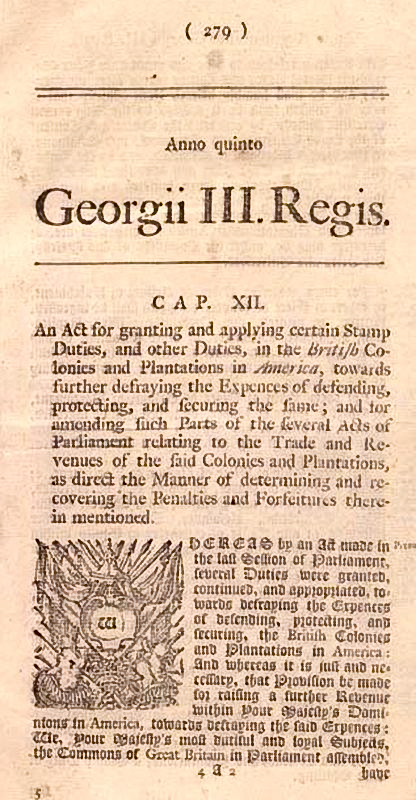
Notice of the Stamp Act 1765 in a colonial newspaper

According to historian Middlekauff, "the need for money played a part in every important decision made by Prime Minister George Grenville regarding the colonies—and for that matter by the ministries that followed up to 1776." The national debt had grown to £133 million with annual debt payments of £5 million (out of an £8 million annual budget). Stationing troops in North America permanently would cost another £360,000 a year. On a per capita basis, Grenville claimed Americans paid 1 shilling in taxes directly to the empire (not including local taxes) compared to 26 shillings paid by the English. The enslaved, a near majority of the population in some colonies, did not pay any taxes and therefore skewed this comparison.

On March 9, 1764, Grenville proposed the Sugar Act, which Parliament enacted in April. It lowered the duty on foreign molasses from 6 pence to 3 pence per gallon. The Treasury believed it would generate £78,000. To ensure this money could be collected, the act strengthened efforts against smuggling. Customs officials could choose whether to prosecute violators in colonial courts or vice admiralty courts. Unlike colonial courts, where there was a presumption of innocence and local juries often acquitted accused smugglers, vice admiralty courts operated on a presumption of guilt, and Crown-appointed judges decided cases.

Most resistance to the Sugar Act came from colonial merchants and legislators, whose primary argument was its negative economic impact on both the colonies and Great Britain. The New England and middle colonies imported molasses from the French West Indies and turned it into rum that was then exchanged for enslaved Africans sold to the southern colonies and the West Indies. This trade generated credit and bills of exchange that the colonists used to pay for British manufactured goods. By the winter of 1764, nine colonial legislatures had petitioned the British government to repeal the Sugar Act.

Grenville decided to levy a stamp duty on the colonies as well. In February 1765, a group of colonial agents, including Benjamin Franklin, met with Grenville to dissuade him. They argued that if Parliament taxed them, governors would never need to convene colonial assemblies again, thereby destroying representative government in America, but Grenville dismissed these concerns. The colonists had allies in the House of Commons, such as Colonel Isaac Barré, who gave an impassioned speech during the debate. Still, Parliament passed the Stamp Act easily, and it received royal assent in March. The act imposed direct taxes on the colonies for the first time. All official documents, newspapers, almanacs, and pamphlets were required to have the stamps—even decks of playing cards.

The colonists did not object that the taxes were high; they were actually low. (Note: Lord North claimed that Englishmen paid an average 25 shillings annually in taxes, whereas Americans paid only sixpence.) They objected to their lack of representation in the Parliament, which gave them no voice concerning legislation that affected them, such as the tax, thereby violating the unwritten English constitution. This grievance was overly simplified with the slogan "No taxation without representation". Shortly following adoption of the Stamp Act, factions of the Sons of Liberty formed in each colony, and began using public demonstrations, boycotts, and threats of violence to ensure that the offending British policies became unenforceable. In Boston, the Sons of Liberty burned the records of the vice admiralty court and looted the home of chief justice Thomas Hutchinson. Several legislatures called for united action, and nine colonies sent delegates to the Stamp Act Congress in New York City in October. Moderates led by John Dickinson drew up a Declaration of Rights and Grievances stating in part that the colonists were equal to all other British subjects and that, among other abuses, taxes passed without representation in Parliament violated their rights as Englishmen.

The Parliament at Westminster saw itself as the supreme lawmaking authority throughout the Empire and thus entitled to enact any legislation, including levying any tax, without colonial approval or even consultation. They argued that the colonies were legally British corporations subordinate to the British Parliament. Parliament insisted that the colonists effectively enjoyed a "virtual representation", as most British people did, since only a small minority of the British population were eligible to elect representatives to Parliament. However, Americans such as James Otis maintained that there was no one in Parliament responsible specifically to any colonial constituency, so they were not "virtually represented" by anyone in Parliament.

The Rockingham government came to power in July 1765, and Parliament debated whether to repeal the stamp tax or to send an army to enforce it. Benjamin Franklin appeared before them to make the case for repeal, explaining that the colonies had spent heavily in manpower, money, and blood defending the empire, and that further taxes to pay for those wars were unjust and might bring about a rebellion. Parliament agreed and repealed the tax on February 21, 1766, but they insisted in the Declaratory Act of March 1766 that they retained full power to make laws for the colonies "in all cases whatsoever". The repeal nonetheless caused widespread celebrations in the colonies.

=== 1767–1773: Townshend Acts, Tea Act and the escalation of violence ===
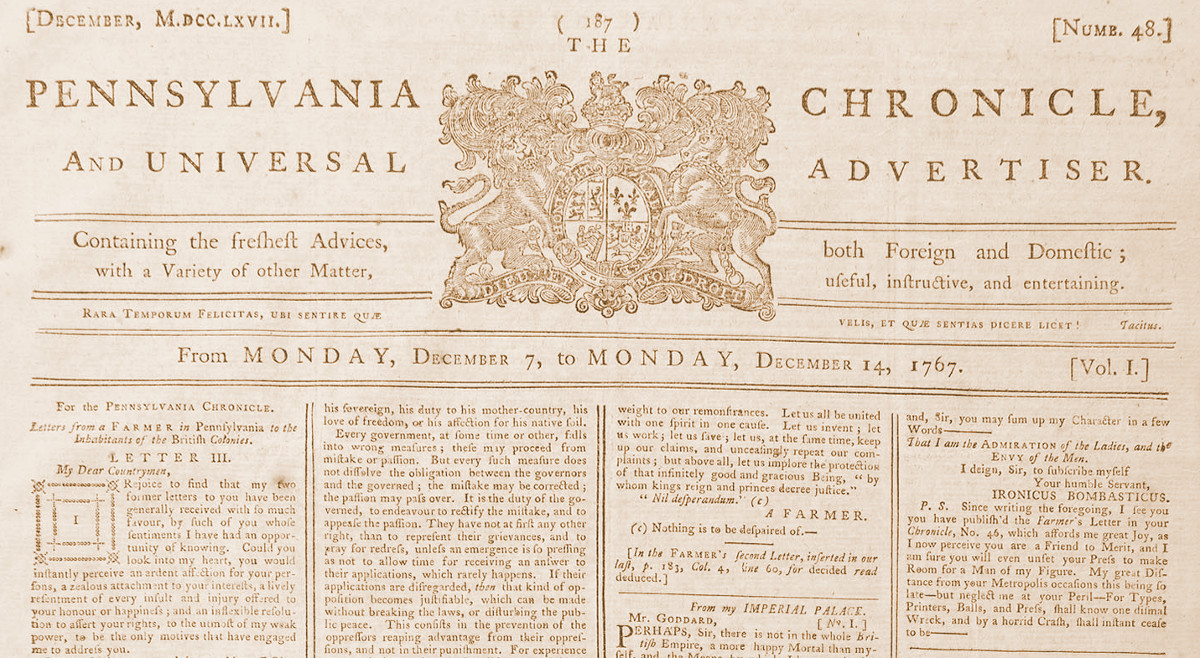
Letter III of John Dickinson's Letters from a Farmer in Pennsylvania, published in the Pennsylvania Chronicle, December 1767

In 1767, the British Parliament passed the Townshend Acts, which placed duties on several staple goods, including paper, glass, and tea, and established a Board of Customs in Boston to more rigorously execute trade regulations. The new taxes were enacted on the belief that Americans only objected to internal taxes and not to external taxes such as custom duties. John Dickinson however, in his widely circulated pamphlet Letters from a Farmer in Pennsylvania, argued against the constitutionality of the acts because their purpose was to raise revenue and not to regulate trade. Colonists responded to the taxes by organizing new boycotts of British goods. These boycotts were less effective, however, as the goods taxed by the Townshend Acts were widely used.

In February 1768, the Assembly of Massachusetts Bay Colony issued a circular letter to the other colonies urging them to coordinate resistance. The governor dissolved the assembly when it refused to rescind the letter. In June 1768 a riot broke out in Boston over the seizure of the sloop Liberty, owned by John Hancock, for alleged smuggling. Customs officials were forced to flee, prompting the British to deploy troops to Boston. A Boston town meeting declared that no obedience was due to parliamentary laws and called for the convening of a convention. A convention assembled but only issued a mild protest before dissolving itself. In January 1769, Parliament endorsed proposals to apply the Treason Act 1543 to alleged acts of treason committed in Massachusetts, which called for subjects outside the realm to face trials in England. The governor of Massachusetts was instructed to collect evidence of said treason, and the threat caused widespread outrage, though it was not carried out.

On March 5, 1770, a large crowd gathered around a group of British soldiers on a Boston street. The crowd grew threatening, throwing snowballs, rocks, and debris at them. One soldier was clubbed and fell. There was no order to fire, but the soldiers panicked and fired into the crowd. They hit 11 people; three civilians died of wounds at the scene of the shooting, and two died shortly after. The event quickly came to be called the Boston Massacre. The soldiers were tried and acquitted (defended by American patriot John Adams), but the widespread descriptions soon began to turn colonial sentiment against the British. This accelerated the downward spiral in the relationship between Britain and the province of Massachusetts, and other colonies were becoming increasingly empathetic.

A new ministry under Lord North came to power in 1770, and Parliament repealed most of the Townshend duties, except the tax on tea. This temporarily resolved the crisis, and the boycott of British goods largely ceased, with only the more radical patriots such as Samuel Adams continuing to agitate.

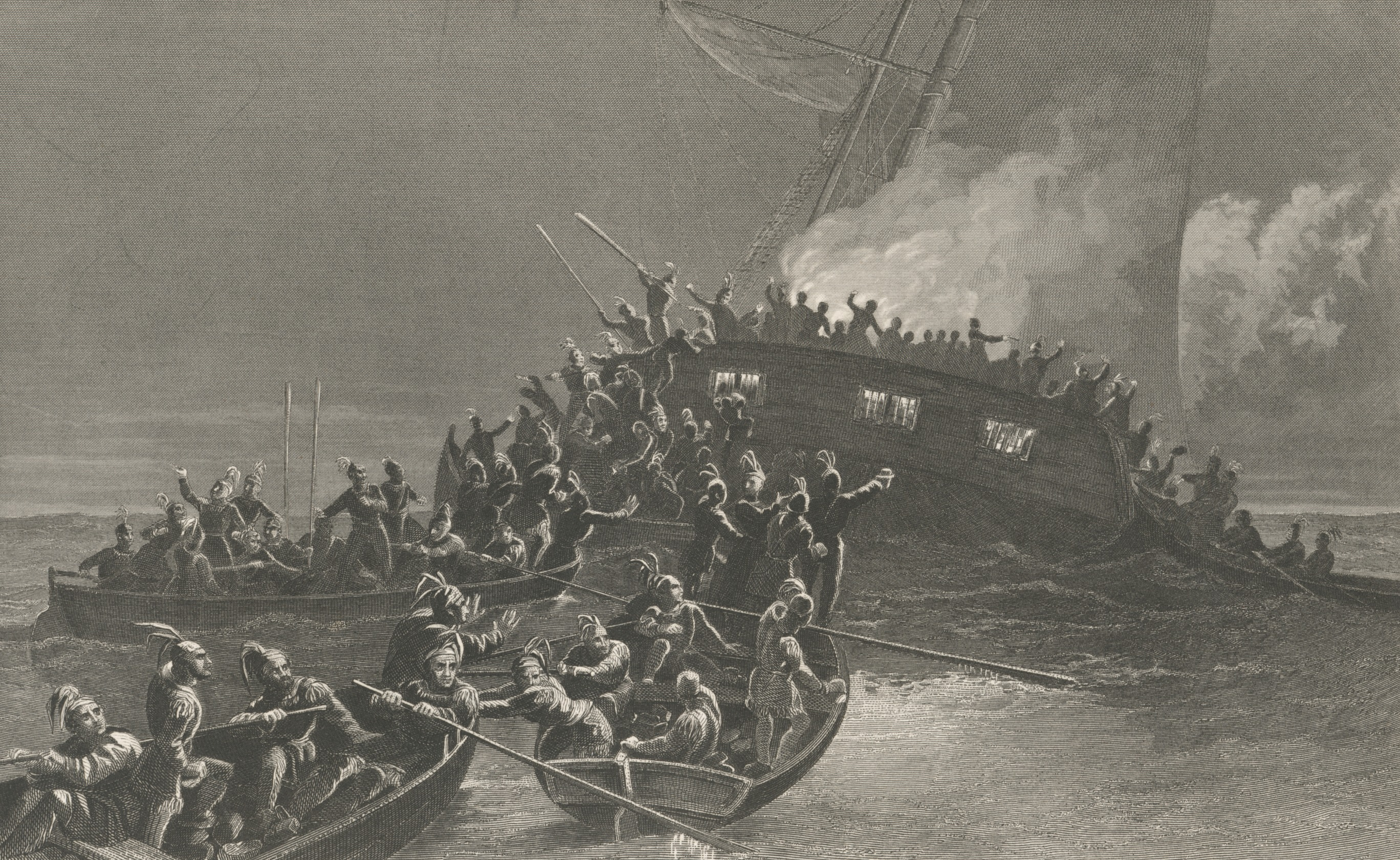
On June 9, 1772, the Sons of Liberty burned HMS Gaspee, a British customs schooner in Narragansett Bay.

In June 1772, American patriots, including John Brown, burned a British warship that had been vigorously enforcing unpopular trade regulations, in what became known as the Gaspee Affair. The affair was investigated for possible treason, but no action was taken.

In 1773, private letters were published in which Massachusetts Governor Thomas Hutchinson advocated restrictions on colonial liberties, while Lieutenant Governor Andrew Oliver supported greater financial independence for colonial officials from the provincial legislature. Such measures threatened to diminish the influence of elected colonial representatives over their government. The letters were interpreted by colonial opponents as evidence of a systematic effort to undermine American rights, severely damaging Hutchinson's reputation. In June 1773, the Massachusetts Assembly petitioned the Crown for the removal of Hutchinson and Oliver. Benjamin Franklin, then deputy postmaster general for British North America, acknowledged having transmitted the letters to Massachusetts. Following the ensuing controversy, Franklin was dismissed from his postal position in January 1774.

From Boston Samuel Adams set about creating new Committees of Correspondence, built largely on the foundations of the underground Sons of Liberty network, linking Patriots in all 13 colonies and eventually providing the framework for a provisional government. Virginia, the largest colony, set up its Committee of Correspondence in early 1773, on which Patrick Henry and Thomas Jefferson served. A total of about 7,000 to 8,000 Patriots served on these Committees; Loyalists were excluded. The committees became the leaders of the American resistance to British actions, and later largely determined the war effort at the state and local level. When the First Continental Congress resolved to boycott British products, the colonial and local Committees took charge, examining merchant records and publishing the names of merchants who attempted to defy the boycott by importing British goods.

The December 16, 1773 Boston Tea Party, led by Samuel Adams and Sons of Liberty, has become a mainstay of American patriotic lore.

Meanwhile, Parliament passed the Tea Act lowering the price of taxed tea exported to the colonies, to help the British East India Company undersell smuggled untaxed Dutch tea. Special consignees were appointed to sell the tea to bypass colonial merchants. The act was opposed by those who resisted the taxes and also by smugglers who stood to lose business. In every colony demonstrators warned merchants not to bring in tea that included the hated new tax. In most instances, the consignees were forced by the Americans to resign and the tea was turned back, but Massachusetts governor Hutchinson refused to allow Boston merchants to give in to pressure.

A town meeting in Boston determined that the tea would not be landed, and ignored a demand from the governor to disperse. On December 16, 1773, a group of men, led by Samuel Adams and dressed to evoke the appearance of Indigenous people, boarded the ships of the East India Company and dumped £10,000 worth of tea from their holds (approximately £636,000 in 2008) into Boston Harbor. Decades later, this event became known as the Boston Tea Party and remains a significant part of American patriotic lore.

=== 1774–1775: Intolerable Acts and the unifying First Continental Congress ===
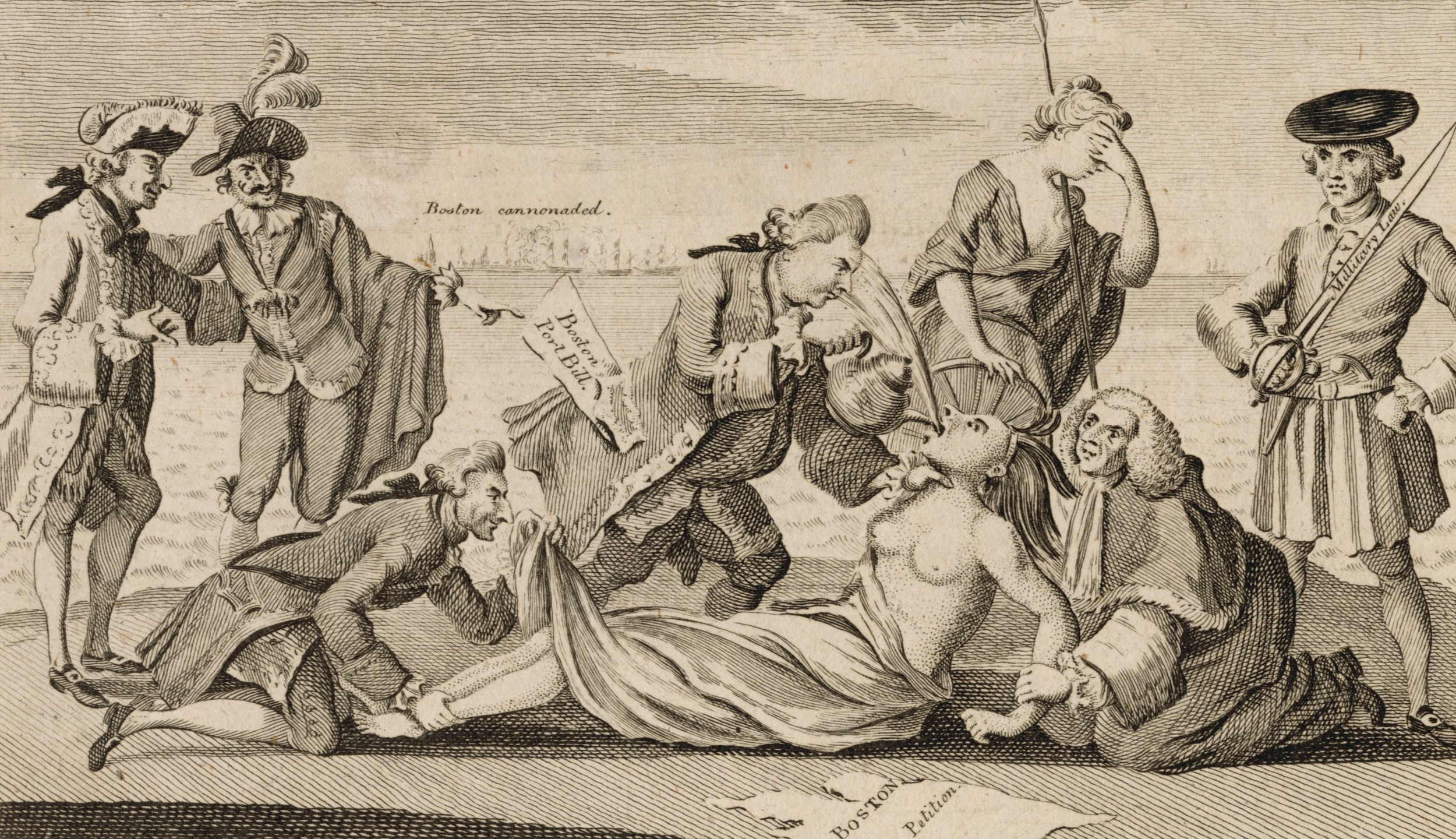
A 1774 illustration from The London Magazine depicts Prime Minister Lord North, author of the Boston Port Act, pouring tea from a teapot labelled "Intolerable Acts" down the throat of America, whose arms are restrained by Lord Chief Justice Mansfield with a tattered "Boston Petition" trampled on the ground beside her. Lord Sandwich pins down her feet and peers up her robes; behind them, Mother Britannia turns away and weeps while personifications of France and Spain look on with smug expressions.

The British government responded by passing four laws that came to be known as the Intolerable Acts, further darkening colonial opinion towards England. The first was the Massachusetts Government Act which altered the Massachusetts charter and restricted town meetings. The second was the Administration of Justice Act which ordered that all British soldiers to be tried were to be arraigned in Britain, not in the colonies. The third was the Boston Port Act, which closed the port of Boston until the British had been compensated for the tea lost in the Boston Tea Party. The fourth was the Quartering Act of 1774, which allowed royal governors to house British troops in the homes of citizens without permission of the owner.

In response, "Starting in August 1774, each time a court was slated to meet in some Massachusetts town, great numbers of angry citizens made sure it did not". The next month Patriots issued the Suffolk Resolves and formed an alternative shadow cabinet known as the Massachusetts Provincial Congress, which began training militia outside British-occupied Boston. In September 1774, the First Continental Congress convened in Pennsylvania, consisting of representatives from each colony, to serve as a vehicle for deliberation and collective action. During secret debates, conservative Joseph Galloway proposed the creation of a colonial Parliament that would be able to approve or disapprove acts of the British Parliament, but his idea was tabled in a vote of 6 to 5 and was subsequently removed from the record. Congress called for a boycott beginning on December 1, 1774, of all British goods; it was enforced by new local committees authorized by the Congress that were largely built upon the earlier Committees of Correspondence. It also began coordinating Patriot resistance by militias in each colony, including many veterans who had gained military experience in the French and Indian War. For the first time, the Patriots were armed and unified against Parliament.

== Military hostilities begin ==
King George III declared Massachusetts to be in a state of rebellion in February 1775 and the British garrison received orders to seize the rebels' weapons and arrest their leaders, resulting in the Battles of Lexington and Concord on April 19, 1775. The Patriots assembled a militia 15,000 strong and laid siege to Boston, occupied by 6500 British soldiers. The Second Continental Congress convened in Philadelphia on June 14, 1775. The congress was divided on the best course of action. They authorized formation of the Continental Army, appointing George Washington as its commander-in-chief, while producing the Olive Branch Petition in which they attempted to come to an accord with King George. The king, however, would issue a Proclamation of Rebellion in August which declared that all the states were "in rebellion" and the members of Congress were traitors. Meanwhile, the Battle of Bunker Hill on June 17, 1775, was a British victory—but at a great cost: about 1,000 British casualties from a garrison of approximately 6,000, as compared to 500 American casualties from a much larger force.

As Benjamin Franklin wrote to Joseph Priestley in October 1775:

Britain, at the expense of three millions, has killed 150 Yankees this campaign, which is £20,000 a head ... During the same time, 60,000 children have been born in America. From these data his mathematical head will easily calculate the time and expense necessary to kill us all.

In the winter of 1775, in the hopes of gaining the support of French-speaking colonists recently conquered by the British, the Americans invaded northeastern Quebec under generals Benedict Arnold and Richard Montgomery. The attack was a failure; many Americans were killed, captured, or died of smallpox.

== From rebellion to revolution ==
Following the Battle of Bunker Hill in June 1775, the Patriots had control of Massachusetts outside Boston's city limits, and the Loyalists suddenly found themselves on the defensive without the protection of the British army. In each of the Thirteen Colonies, American patriots overthrew their existing governments, closed courts, and drove out British colonial officials. They held elected conventions and established their own legislatures, which existed outside any legal parameters established by the British. The Americans drafted new constitutions to supersede royal charters, proclaiming that they were now states, no longer colonies.

=== Creating new state constitutions ===
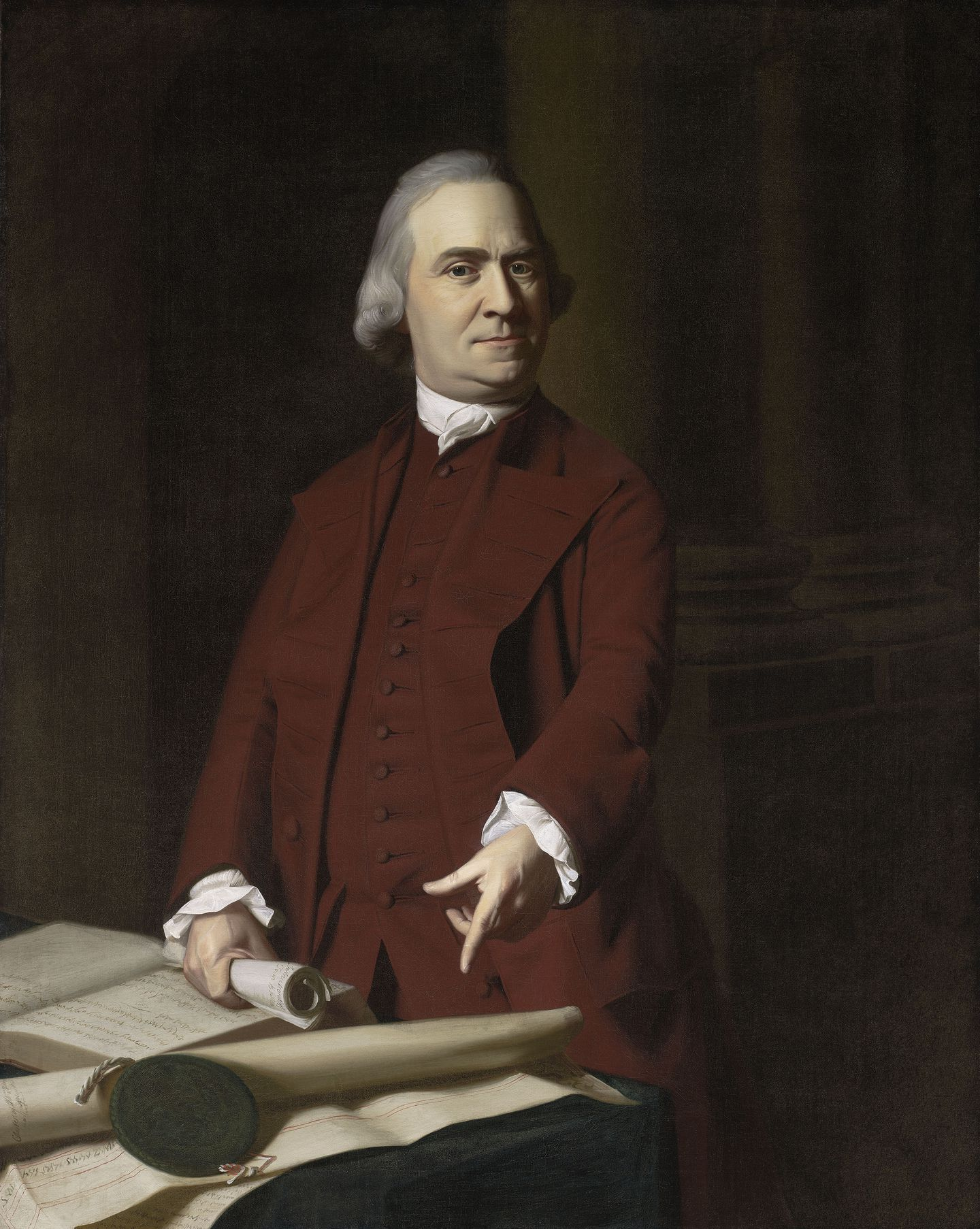
Samuel Adams points at the Massachusetts Charter, which he viewed as a constitution that protected the people's rights, in this c. 1772 portrait by John Singleton Copley.

On January 5, 1776, New Hampshire ratified the first state constitution. In May 1776, Congress voted to suppress all forms of Crown authority, to be replaced by locally created authority. New Jersey, South Carolina, and Virginia created their constitutions before July 4. Rhode Island and Connecticut simply took their existing royal charters and deleted all references to the Crown. The new states were all committed to republicanism, with no inherited offices. On May 26, 1776, John Adams wrote James Sullivan from Philadelphia, warning against extending the franchise too far:

Depend upon it, sir, it is dangerous to open so fruitful a source of controversy and altercation, as would be opened by attempting to alter the qualifications of voters. There will be no end of it. New claims will arise. Women will demand a vote. Lads from twelve to twenty one will think their rights not enough attended to, and every man, who has not a farthing, will demand an equal voice with any other in all acts of state. It tends to confound and destroy all distinctions, and prostrate all ranks, to one common level[.]

The resulting constitutions in states, including those of Delaware, Maryland, Massachusetts, New York, and Virginia (Note: Massachusetts' constitution is still in force in the 21st century, continuously since its ratification on June 15, 1780) featured:

- Property qualifications for voting and even more substantial requirements for elected positions (though New York and Maryland lowered property qualifications)
- Bicameral legislatures, with the upper house as a check on the lower
- Strong governors with veto power over the legislature and substantial appointment authority
- Few or no restraints on individuals holding multiple positions in government
- The continuation of state-established religion

In Pennsylvania, New Jersey, and New Hampshire, the resulting constitutions embodied:

- universal manhood suffrage, or minimal property requirements for voting or holding office (New Jersey enfranchised some property-owning widows, a step that it retracted 25 years later)
- strong, unicameral legislatures
- relatively weak governors without veto powers, and with little appointing authority
- prohibition against individuals holding multiple government posts

The radical provisions of Pennsylvania's constitution lasted 14 years. In 1790, conservatives gained power in the state legislature, called a new constitutional convention, and rewrote the constitution. The new constitution substantially reduced universal male suffrage, gave the governor veto power and patronage appointment authority, and added an upper house with substantial wealth qualifications to the unicameral legislature. Thomas Paine called it a constitution unworthy of America.

=== Declaration of Independence ===
In March 1776, aided by the fortification of Dorchester Heights with cannons recently captured at Fort Ticonderoga, the Continental Army led by George Washington forced the British to evacuate Boston. The revolutionaries now fully controlled all thirteen states and were ready to declare joint independence. There still were many Loyalists, but they were no longer in control anywhere by July 1776, and all of the royal officials had fled.

In April 1776, the North Carolina Provincial Congress issued the Halifax Resolves explicitly authorizing its delegates to vote for independence. By June, nine state legislatures supported independence from Britain, and Pennsylvania, Delaware, Maryland, and New York followed. Richard Henry Lee was instructed by the Virginia legislature to propose independence, and he did so on June 7, 1776.

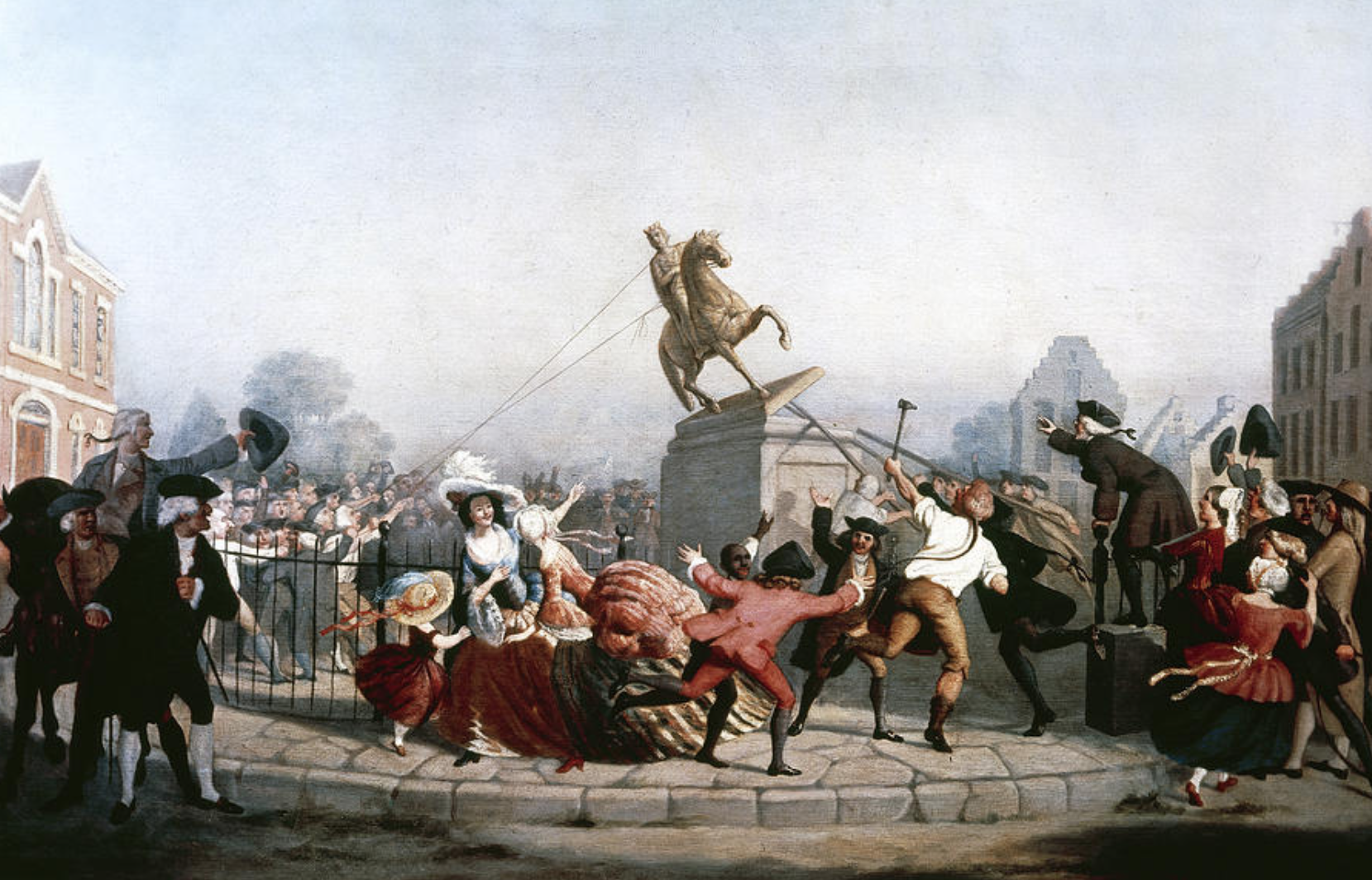
Pulling Down the Statue of King George III, N.Y.C., depicting American patriots tearing down a statue of King George III in New York City on July 9, 1776, immediately after Commander-in-Chief George Washington had the Declaration of Independence read aloud to the Continental Army and the public on the city's common green five days after it was issued in Philadelphia.

Gathered at Pennsylvania State House in Philadelphia, later renamed Independence Hall, 56 of the nation's Founding Fathers representing the United Colonies adopted and issued to King George III the Declaration of Independence. It had been drafted largely by Thomas Jefferson, and was edited and presented by the Committee of Five which was charged with authoring it. The Congress struck several provisions of the committee's draft, and then adopted it unanimously on July 4. The Declaration embodied universal rights expressed through the political philosophies of liberalism and republicanism, rejected monarchy and aristocracy, and famously proclaimed that "all men are created equal". What had begun as a rebellion demanding the rights of Englishmen had now evolved into a revolution to overthrow and replace the political and social order in America based on universal rights.

=== "Perpetual Union" ===
With the new state constitutions and the issuance of the Declaration of Independence, each former colony began operating as an independent and sovereign state. The next step was to form a union to facilitate international relations and alliances.

On November 5, 1777, the Congress approved the Articles of Confederation and Perpetual Union and sent it to each state for ratification. The Congress immediately began operating under the Articles' terms, providing a structure of shared sovereignty during prosecution of the Revolutionary War. The Articles were fully ratified on March 1, 1781. At that point, the Continental Congress was dissolved and a new government of the United States in Congress Assembled took its place the following day, with Samuel Huntington leading the Congress as presiding officer. It remained a unicameral body, where each state retained one vote.

== Defending the revolution ==
=== British return: 1776–1777 ===
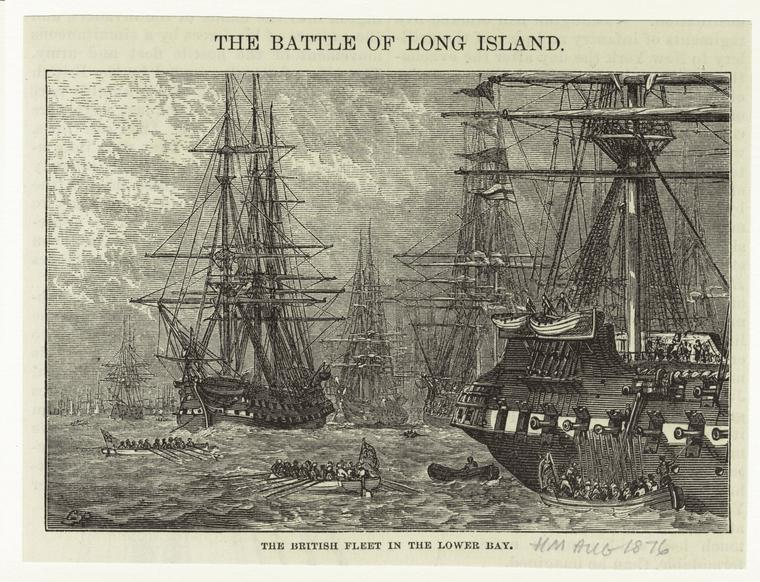
The British fleet amassed off Staten Island in New York Harbor in the summer of 1776, as depicted in Harper's Magazine in 1876

According to British historian Jeremy Black, the British had significant advantages, including a highly trained army, the world's largest navy, and an efficient system of public finance that could easily fund the war. However, they seriously misunderstood the depth of support for the American Patriot position, misinterpreting the situation as merely a large-scale riot. The British government believed that they could overawe the Americans by sending a large military and naval force:

"Convinced that the Revolution was the work of a full few miscreants who had rallied an armed rabble to their cause, they expected that the revolutionaries would be intimidated .... Then the vast majority of Americans, who were loyal but cowed by the terroristic tactics ... would rise up, kick out the rebels, and restore loyal government in each colony."

In the Siege of Boston, Washington forced the British out of the city in the spring of 1776, and neither the British nor the Loyalists controlled any significant areas. The British, however, were amassing forces at their naval base at Halifax, Nova Scotia. They returned in force in July 1776, landing in New York and defeating Washington's Continental Army toe-to-toe in August at the Battle of Brooklyn, the largest battle of the war. Following that victory, and poised to take New York City, they requested a meeting with representatives from Congress to negotiate an end to hostilities.

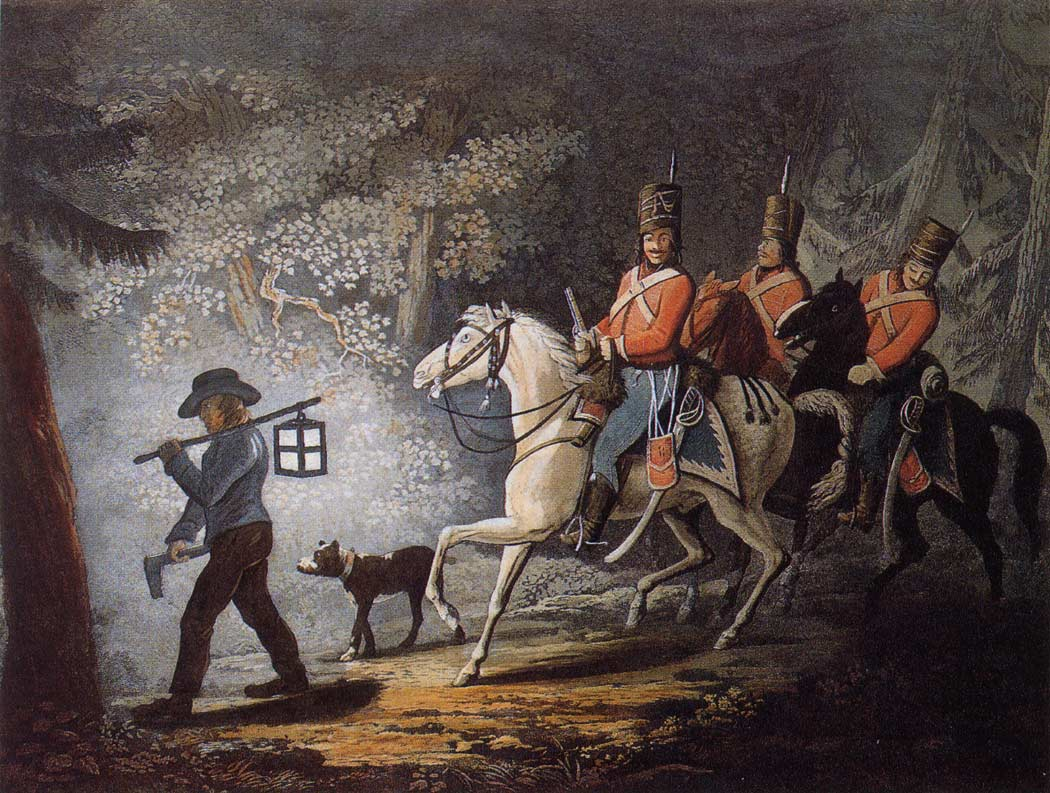
Hessian troops hired out to the British by their German sovereigns

A delegation including John Adams and Benjamin Franklin met British admiral Richard Howe on Staten Island in New York Harbor on September 11 in what became known as the Staten Island Peace Conference. Howe demanded that the Americans retract the Declaration of Independence, which they refused to do, and negotiations ended. The British then seized New York City and nearly captured Washington's army. They made the city their main political and military base of operations, holding the strategic harbor and port until November 1783. The city became the destination for Loyalist refugees and a focal point of Washington's intelligence network.

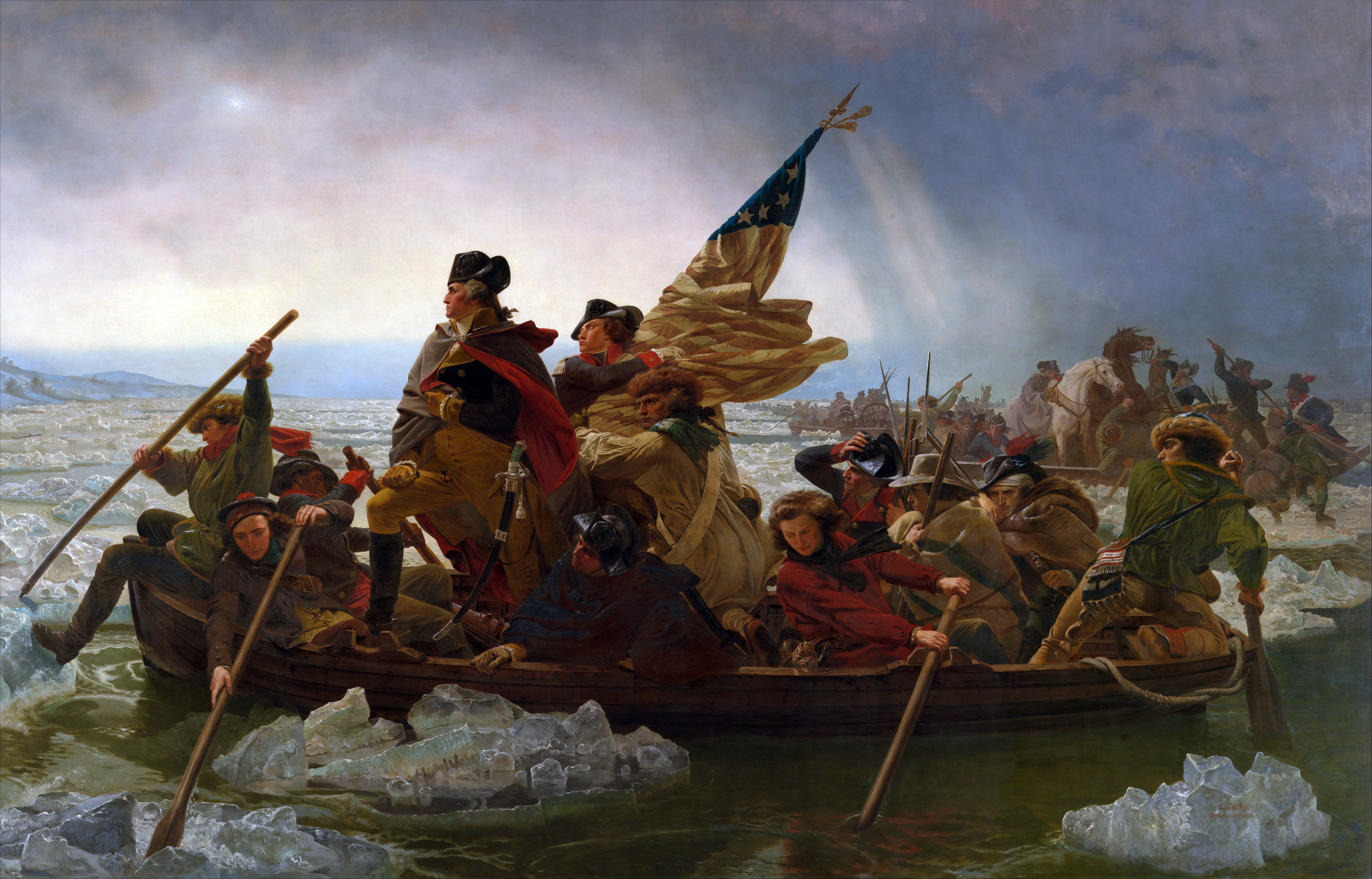
Washington crossing the Delaware on December 25–26, 1776, depicted in Emanuel Leutze's 1851 painting

The British also took New Jersey, pushing the Continental Army into Pennsylvania. Washington crossed the Delaware River back into New Jersey in a surprise attack in late December 1776 and defeated the Hessian and British garrisons at Trenton, and then again in early January against the garrisons at Princeton, thereby regaining control of most of New Jersey. The victories gave an important boost to Patriots at a time when morale was flagging and enlistments were ending, and they have become iconic events of the war.

In 1777, the British launched an invasion from Canada under General John Burgoyne, intending to isolate New England from the other states by gaining control of the Hudson River corridor. The plan called for British forces to converge near Albany, New York. However, General William Howe instead launched the Philadelphia campaign, leaving Burgoyne without the anticipated support. Burgoyne's army encountered increasing American resistance and ultimately surrendered following the Battles of Saratoga in October 1777.

As British forces approached Philadelphia, the Continental Congress evacuated the city in September 1777, meeting briefly in Lancaster, Pennsylvania, before relocating to York, Pennsylvania, where it continued its proceedings. British forces occupied Philadelphia in September, but American defenses along the Delaware River delayed British efforts to secure supply routes to the city. The defenders of Fort Mifflin resisted a sustained British bombardment before abandoning the fort on November 15, 1777. Washington's Continental Army subsequently entered winter quarters at Valley Forge on December 19, 1777.

=== Prisoners ===
On August 23, 1775, George III declared Americans to be traitors to the Crown if they took up arms against royal authority. There were thousands of British and Hessian soldiers in American hands following their surrender at the Battles of Saratoga. Lord Germain took a hard line, but the British generals on American soil never held treason trials, and instead treated captured American soldiers as prisoners of war. The dilemma was that tens of thousands of Loyalists were under American control and American retaliation would have been easy. The British built much of their strategy around using these Loyalists. The British maltreated the prisoners whom they held, resulting in more American deaths in the prisons than all the American battlefield mortalities, combined. At the end of the war, both sides released their surviving prisoners.

=== American alliances after 1778 ===
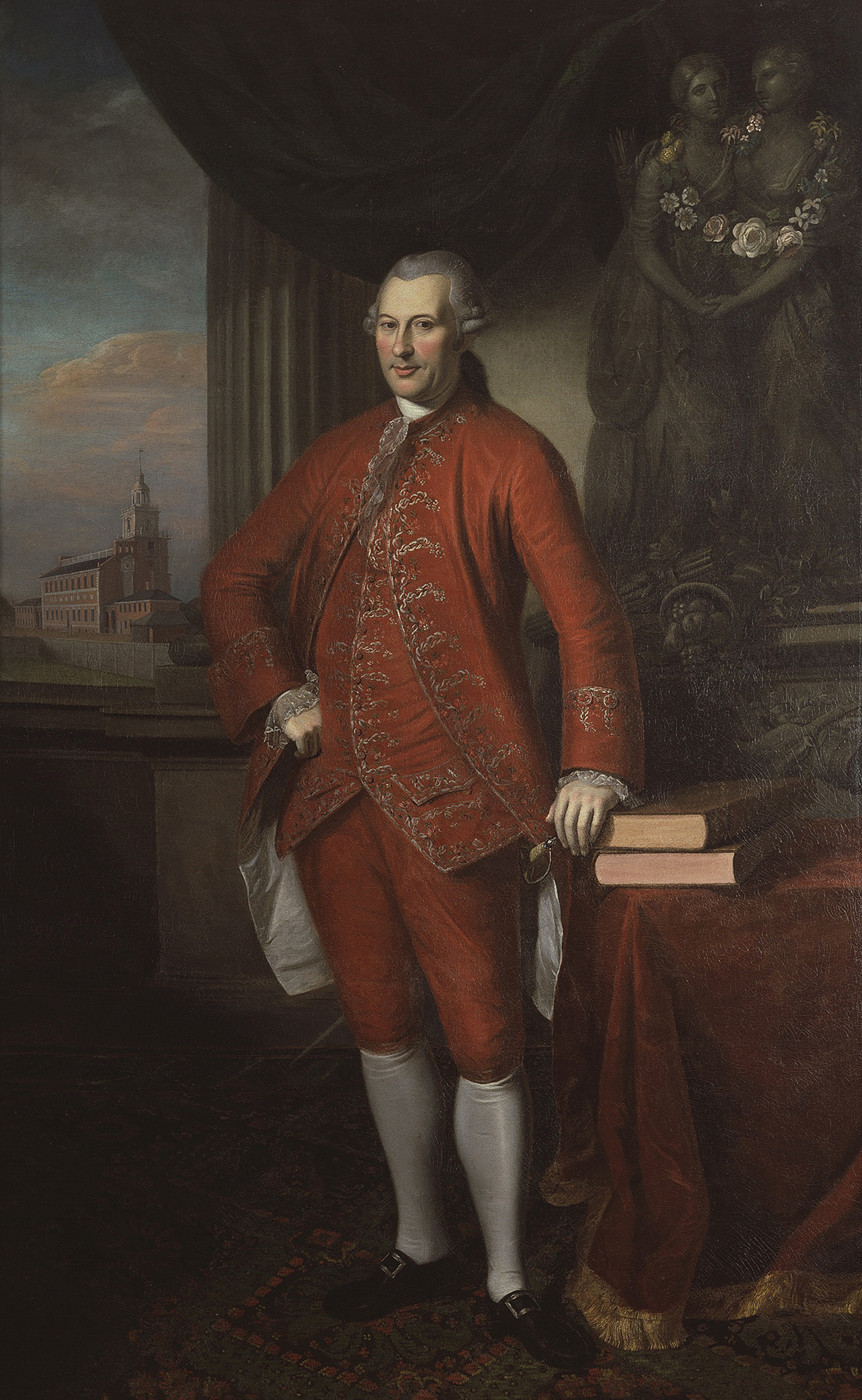
Conrad Alexandre Gérard de Rayneval, first French representative to the United States and signatory to the alliance treaties.

The capture of a British army at Saratoga encouraged the French to formally enter the war in support of Congress, and Benjamin Franklin negotiated a permanent military alliance in early 1778; France thus became the first foreign nation to officially recognize the Declaration of Independence and, consequently, American sovereignty. On February 6, 1778, the United States and France signed the Treaty of Amity and Commerce and the Treaty of Alliance. William Pitt spoke out in Parliament urging Britain to make peace with the Americans and to unite against France, while British politicians who had sympathized with colonial grievances now turned against the Americans for allying with Britain's rival and enemy.

The Spanish and the Dutch became allies of the French in 1779 and 1780 respectively, forcing the British to fight a global war without major allies, and requiring it to slip through a combined blockade of the Atlantic. The Dutch Republic, also at war with Britain, was the next country after France to sign a treaty with the United States, on October 8, 1782. On April 3, 1783, Ambassador Extraordinary Gustaf Philip Creutz, representing King Gustav III of Sweden, and Benjamin Franklin, signed a Treaty of Amity and Commerce with the U.S.

=== 1778–1783: the British move south ===
Britain began to view the American Revolutionary War as merely one front in a wider war, and the British chose to withdraw troops from America to reinforce the British colonies in the Caribbean, which were under threat of Spanish or French invasion. British commander Sir Henry Clinton evacuated Philadelphia and returned to New York City. Washington intercepted him in the Battle of Monmouth Court House, the last major battle fought in the north. After an inconclusive engagement, the British retreated to New York City. The northern war subsequently became a stalemate, as the focus of attention shifted to the smaller southern theater.

The British Royal Navy blockaded ports and held New York City for the duration of the war, and other cities for brief periods, but failed in their effort to destroy Washington's forces. The British strategy now concentrated on a campaign in the southern states. Due to a lack of regular troops at their disposal compared to the Americans, the British commanders saw the "southern strategy" as a more viable plan. They perceived the Southern Colonies as strongly Loyalist, with a large population of recent British immigrants, and large numbers of slaves who might be tempted to run away from their Patriot masters to join the British and gain their freedom.

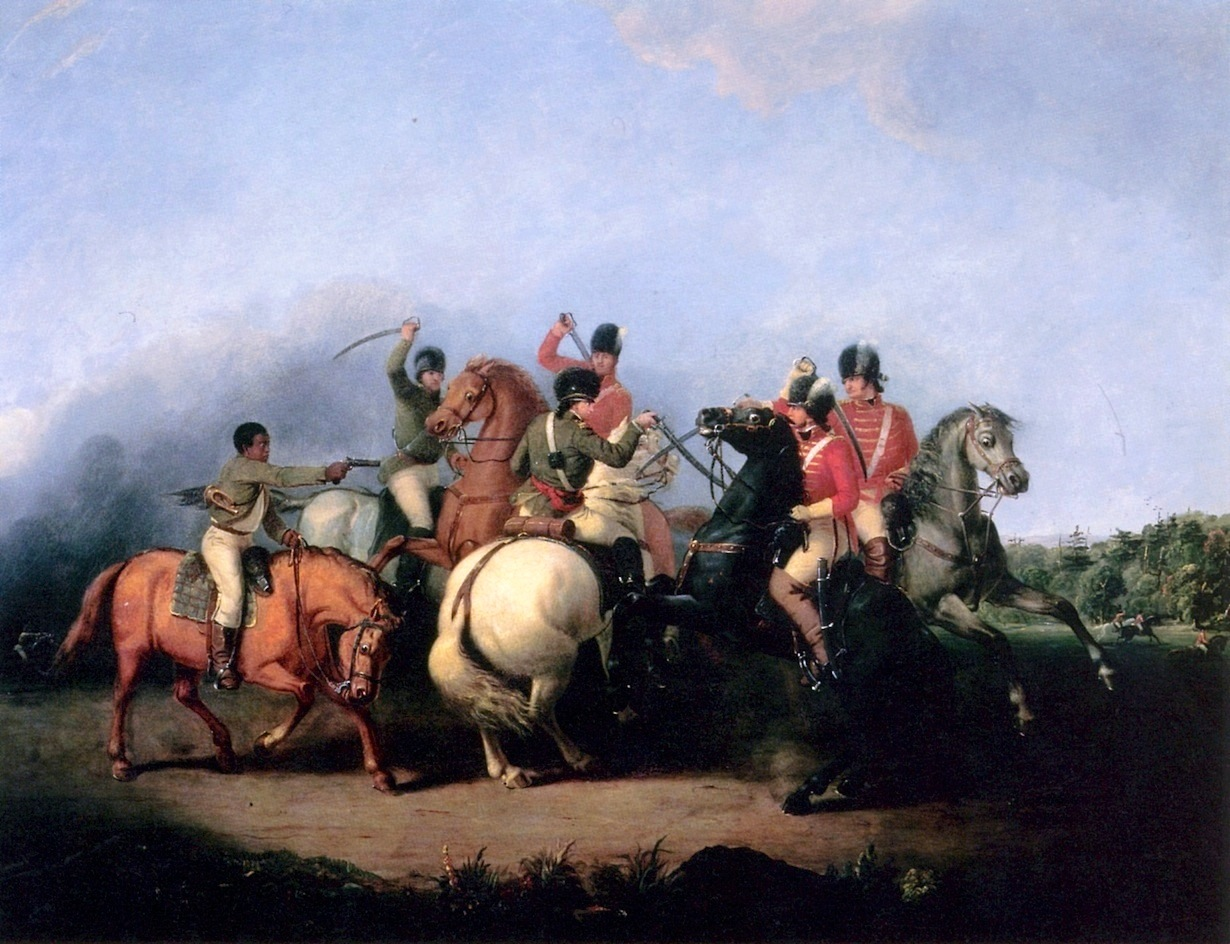
The Battle of Cowpens, depicting the 1781 battle in South Carolina, painted by William Ranney in 1845.

Beginning in late December 1778, the British captured Savannah and controlled the Georgia coastline. In 1780, they launched a fresh invasion and took Charleston. A significant victory at the Battle of Camden meant that royal forces soon controlled most of Georgia and South Carolina. The British set up a network of forts inland, hoping that the Loyalists would rally to the flag. Not enough Loyalists turned out, however, and the British had to fight their way north into North Carolina and Virginia with a severely weakened army. Behind them, much of the territory that they had already captured dissolved into a chaotic guerrilla war, fought predominantly between bands of Loyalists and American militia, which negated many of the gains that the British had previously made.

==== Surrender at Yorktown (1781) ====
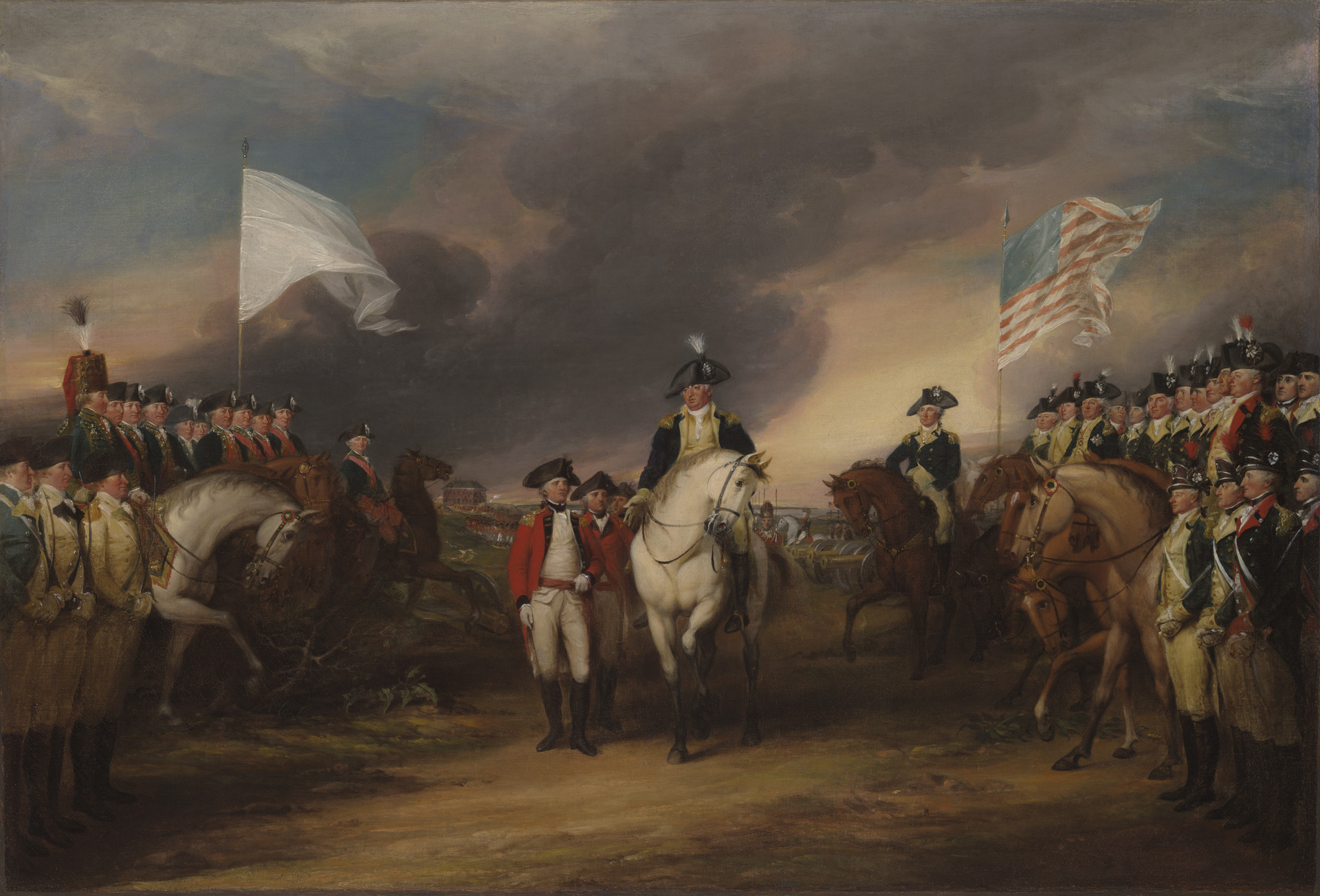
The 1781 siege of Yorktown ended with the surrender of a second British army, marking effective British defeat.

The British army under Cornwallis marched to Yorktown, Virginia, where they expected to be rescued by a British fleet. The fleet did arrive, but so did a larger French fleet. The French were victorious in the Battle of the Chesapeake, and the British fleet returned to New York for reinforcements, leaving Cornwallis trapped. In October 1781, the British surrendered their second invading army of the war under a siege by the combined French and Continental armies commanded by Washington.

=== End of the war ===
Washington did not know if or when the British might reopen hostilities after Yorktown. They still had 26,000 troops occupying New York City, Charleston, and Savannah, together with a powerful fleet. The French army and navy departed, so the Americans were on their own in 1782–83. The American treasury was empty, and the unpaid soldiers were growing restive, almost to the point of mutiny or possible coup d'etat. Washington dispelled the unrest among officers of the Newburgh Conspiracy in 1783, and Congress subsequently created the promise of a five years bonus for all officers.

Historians continue to debate whether the odds were long or short for American victory. John E. Ferling says that the odds were so long that the American victory was "almost a miracle". On the other hand, Joseph Ellis says that the odds favored the Americans, and asks whether there ever was any realistic chance for the British to win. He argues that this opportunity came only once, in the summer of 1776, where Admiral Howe and his brother General Howe "missed several opportunities to destroy the Continental Army .... Chance, luck, and even the vagaries of the weather played crucial roles." Ellis's point is that the strategic and tactical decisions of the Howes were fatally flawed because they underestimated the challenges posed by the Patriots. Ellis concludes that, once the Howe brothers failed, the opportunity "would never come again" for a British victory.

Public support for the conflict had never been strong in Britain, where many sympathized with the Americans, but now it reached a new low. King George wanted to fight on, but his supporters lost control of Parliament and the British launched no further offensives in America on the eastern seaboard. (Note: A final naval battle was fought on March 10, 1783, by Captain John Barry and the crew of the USS Alliance, who defeated three British warships led by HMS Sybille.)

== Paris peace treaty ==
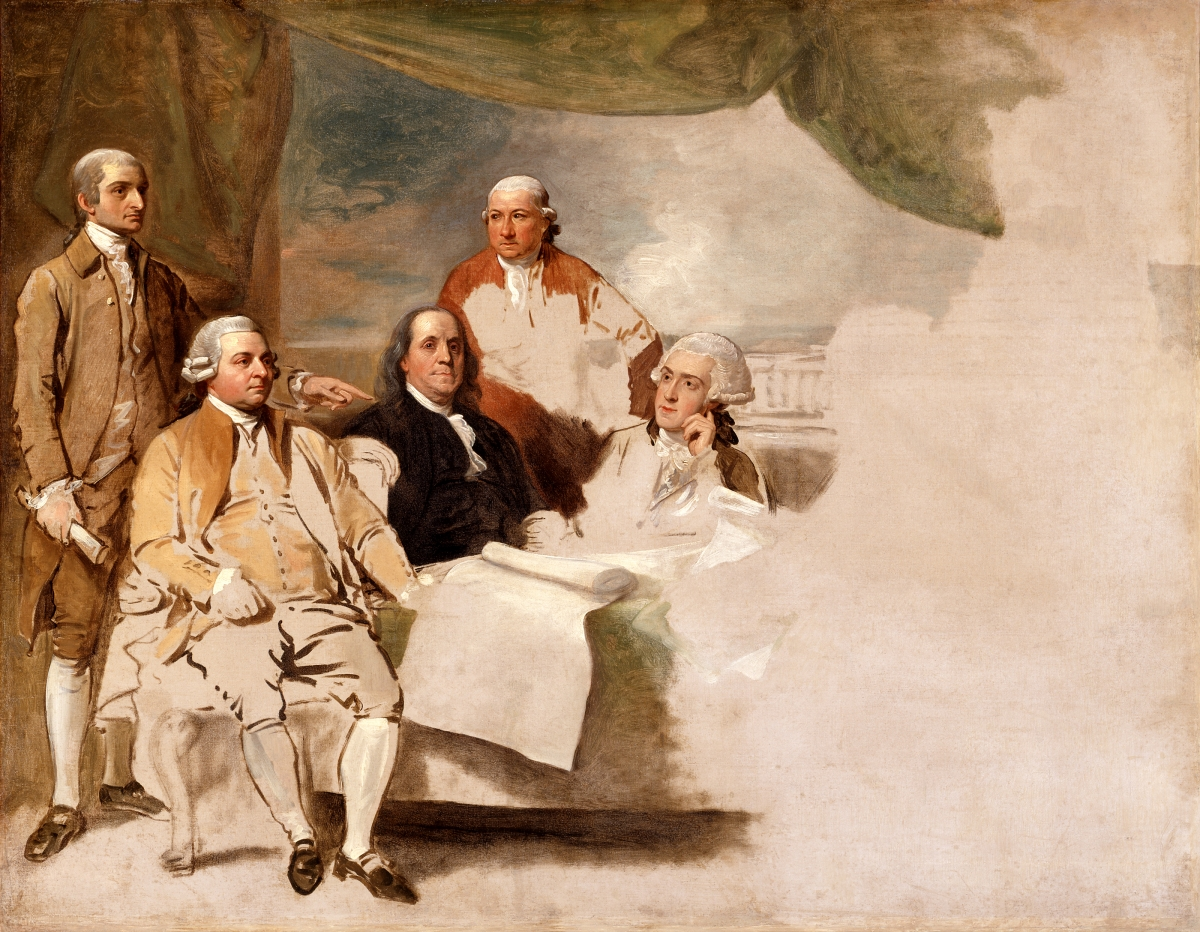
Treaty of Paris by Benjamin West portrays the American delegation about to sign the 1783 Treaty of Paris (John Jay, John Adams, Benjamin Franklin, Henry Laurens, W. T. Franklin). The British delegation refused to pose and the painting was never completed.

During negotiations in Paris, the American delegation discovered that France supported American independence but no territorial gains, hoping to confine the new nation to the area east of the Appalachian Mountains. The Americans opened direct secret negotiations with London, cutting out the French. British Prime Minister Lord Shelburne was in charge of the British negotiations, and he saw a chance to make the United States a valuable economic partner, facilitating trade and investment opportunities. The US obtained all the land east of the Mississippi River, including southern Canada below the Great Lakes, but Spain took control of Florida from the British. It gained fishing rights off Canadian coasts, and agreed to allow British merchants and Loyalists to recover their property. Prime Minister Shelburne foresaw highly profitable two-way trade between Britain and the rapidly growing United States, which did come to pass. The blockade was lifted and American merchants were free to trade with any nation anywhere in the world.

The British largely abandoned their Indigenous allies, who were not a party to this treaty and did not recognize it until they were defeated militarily by the United States. However, the British did sell them munitions and maintained forts in American territory until the Jay Treaty of 1795.

== Finance ==
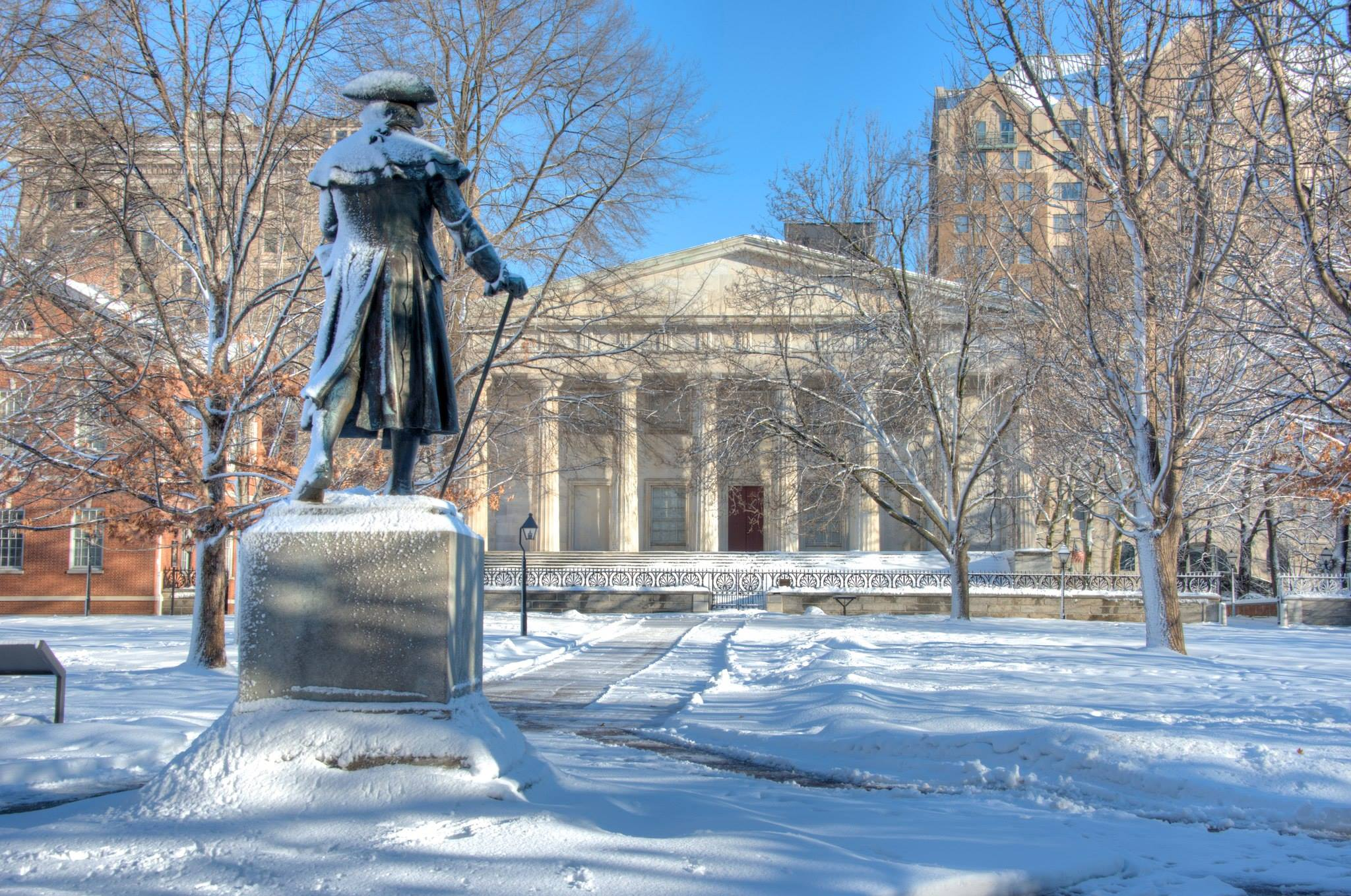
Robert Morris statue honoring Founding Father and financier Robert Morris at Independence National Historical Park in Philadelphia

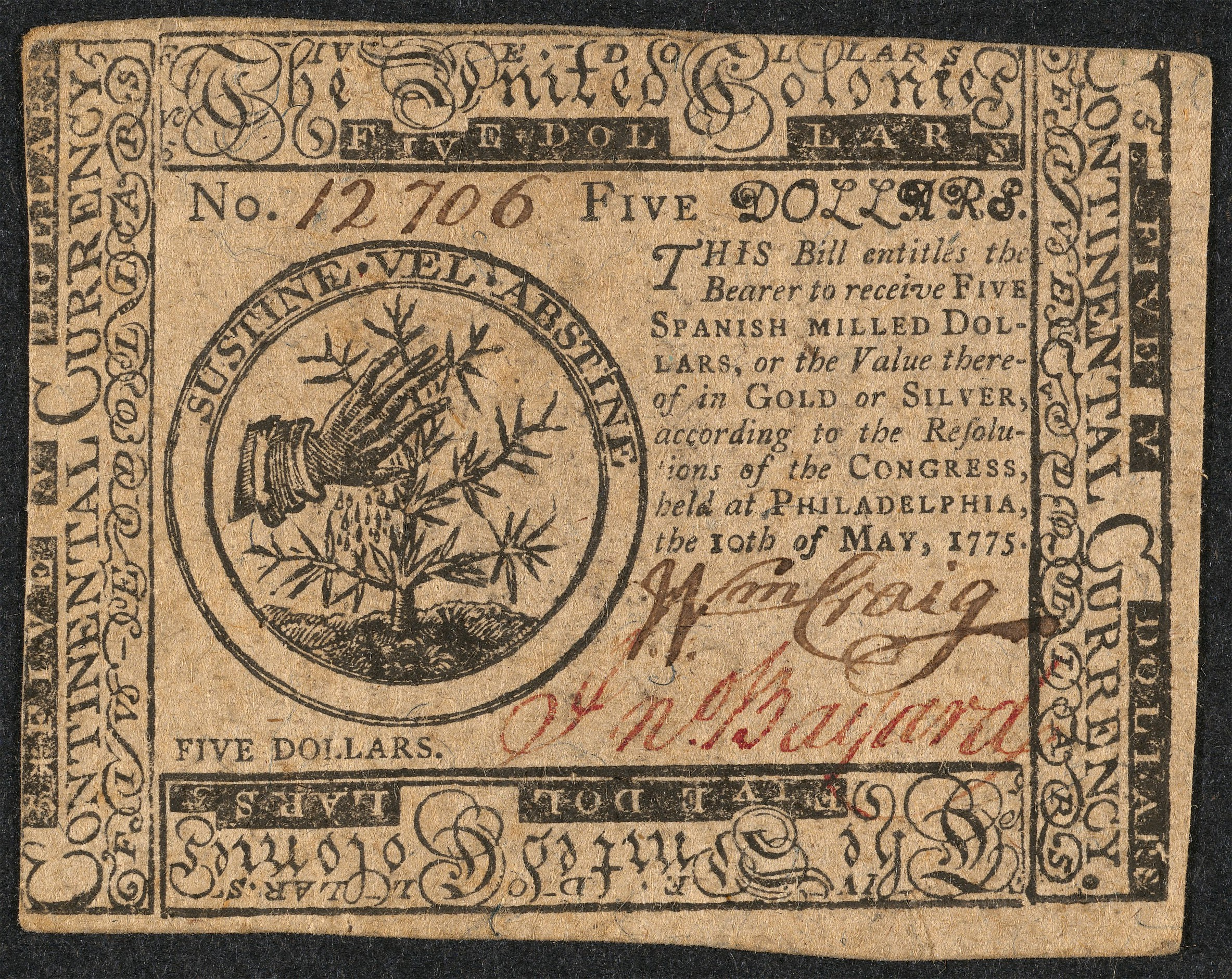
A five dollar banknote issued by the Second Continental Congress in 1775

Britain's war against the Americans, the French, and the Spanish cost about £100 million. The Treasury borrowed 40 percent of the money that it needed. Britain had a sophisticated financial system based on the wealth of thousands of landowners who supported the government, together with banks and financiers in London. In London the British had relatively little difficulty financing their war, keeping their suppliers and soldiers paid, and hiring tens of thousands of German soldiers.

In sharp contrast, Congress and the American states had no end of difficulty financing the war. In 1775, there was at most 12 million dollars in gold in the colonies, not nearly enough to cover current transactions, let alone finance a major war. The British made the situation much worse by imposing a tight blockade on every American port, which cut off almost all trade. One partial solution was to rely on volunteer support from militiamen and donations from patriotic citizens. Another was to delay actual payments, pay soldiers and suppliers in depreciated currency, and promise that it would be made good after the war. Indeed, the soldiers and officers were given land grants in 1783 to cover the wages that they had earned but had not been paid during the war.

Starting in 1776, the Congress sought to raise money by loans from wealthy individuals, promising to redeem the bonds after the war. The bonds were redeemed in 1791 at face value, but the scheme raised little money because Americans had little specie, and many of the richest merchants were supporters of the Crown. Beginning in 1777, Congress repeatedly asked the states to provide money, but it had no system of taxation to require funds, and the states were of little help. By 1780, Congress was making requisitions for specific supplies of corn, beef, pork, and other necessities, an inefficient system which barely kept the army alive.

Congress used four main methods to cover the cost of the war, which cost about 66 million dollars in specie (gold and silver). Significantly, the French secretly supplied the Americans with money, gunpowder, and munitions to weaken Great Britain; the subsidies continued when France entered the war in 1778, and the French government and Paris bankers lent about 18 million livres to the American war effort. Congress also made issues of paper money, known colloquially as "Continental Dollars", in 1775–1780 and in 1780–1781. The first issue amounted to 242 million dollars. This paper money would supposedly be redeemed for state taxes, but the holders were eventually paid off in 1791 at the rate of one cent on the dollar. By 1780, the paper money was so devalued that the phrase "not worth a Continental" became synonymous with valueless. The skyrocketing inflation was a hardship on the few people who had fixed incomes, but 90 percent of the people were farmers and were not directly affected by it. Debtors benefited by paying off their debts with depreciated paper. The greatest burden was borne by the soldiers of the Continental Army whose wages were usually paid late and depreciated in value every month, weakening their morale and adding to the hardships of their families.

The national government did not have a strong leader in financial matters until 1781, when Robert Morris was named Superintendent of Finance of the United States. Morris used a French loan in 1782 to set up the private Bank of North America to finance the war. He reduced the civil list, saved money by using competitive bidding for contracts, tightened accounting procedures, and demanded the national government's full share of money and supplies from the individual states.

== "A more perfect union" ==
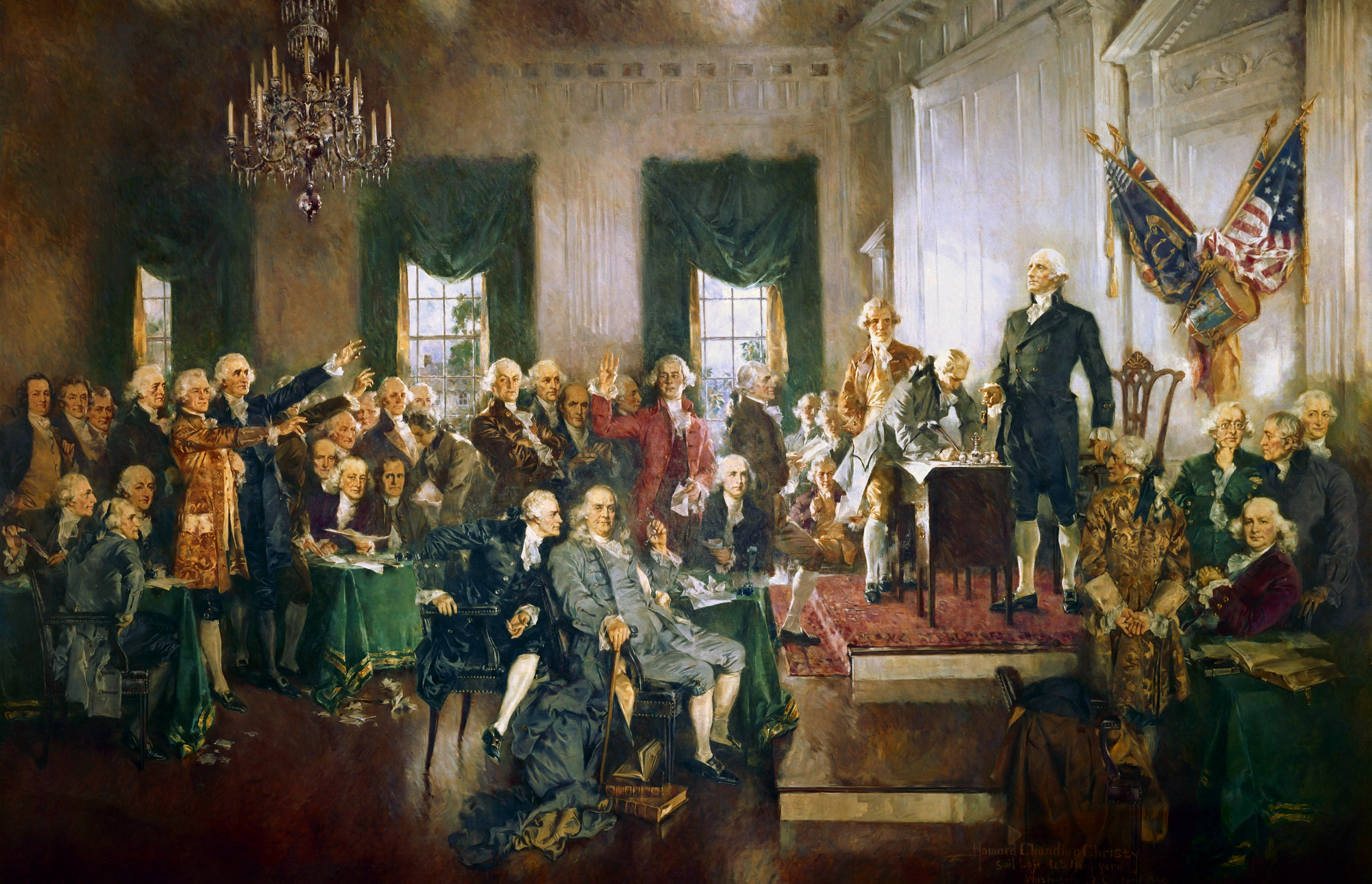
The September 17, 1787 signing of the United States Constitution at Independence Hall in Philadelphia depicted in Howard Chandler Christy's 1940 painting, Scene at the Signing of the Constitution of the United States

The war ended in 1783 and was followed by a period of slow economic recovery that accompanied the end of mercantilism and the resumption and expansion of worldwide trade. The national government was still operating under the Articles of Confederation and settled the issue of the western territories, which the states ceded to Congress. American settlers moved rapidly into those areas, with Vermont, Kentucky, and Tennessee becoming states in the 1790s.

However, the national government had no authority to tax, no money either to pay the war debts owed to European nations and the private banks, or to pay Americans who had been given millions of dollars of promissory notes for supplies during the war. Nationalists led by Washington, Alexander Hamilton, and other veterans feared that the new nation was too fragile to withstand an international war, or even the repetition of internal revolts such as the Shays's Rebellion of 1786 in Massachusetts. They convinced the Congress of the Confederation to call the Philadelphia Convention in 1787. The Convention adopted a new Constitution which provided for a republic with authority to tax and a much stronger national government in a federal framework, including an effective executive in a check-and-balance system with the judiciary and legislature. The Constitution was ratified in 1788, after a fierce debate in the states over the proposed new government. The new administration under President George Washington took office in New York in March 1789 and the new bicameral Congress of the United States was seated. James Madison spearheaded Congressional legislation proposing amendments to the Constitution as assurances to those cautious about federal power, guaranteeing many of the inalienable rights that formed a foundation for the revolution. Rhode Island was the final state to ratify the Constitution in 1790, the first ten amendments were ratified in 1791 and became known as the United States Bill of Rights.

=== National debt ===
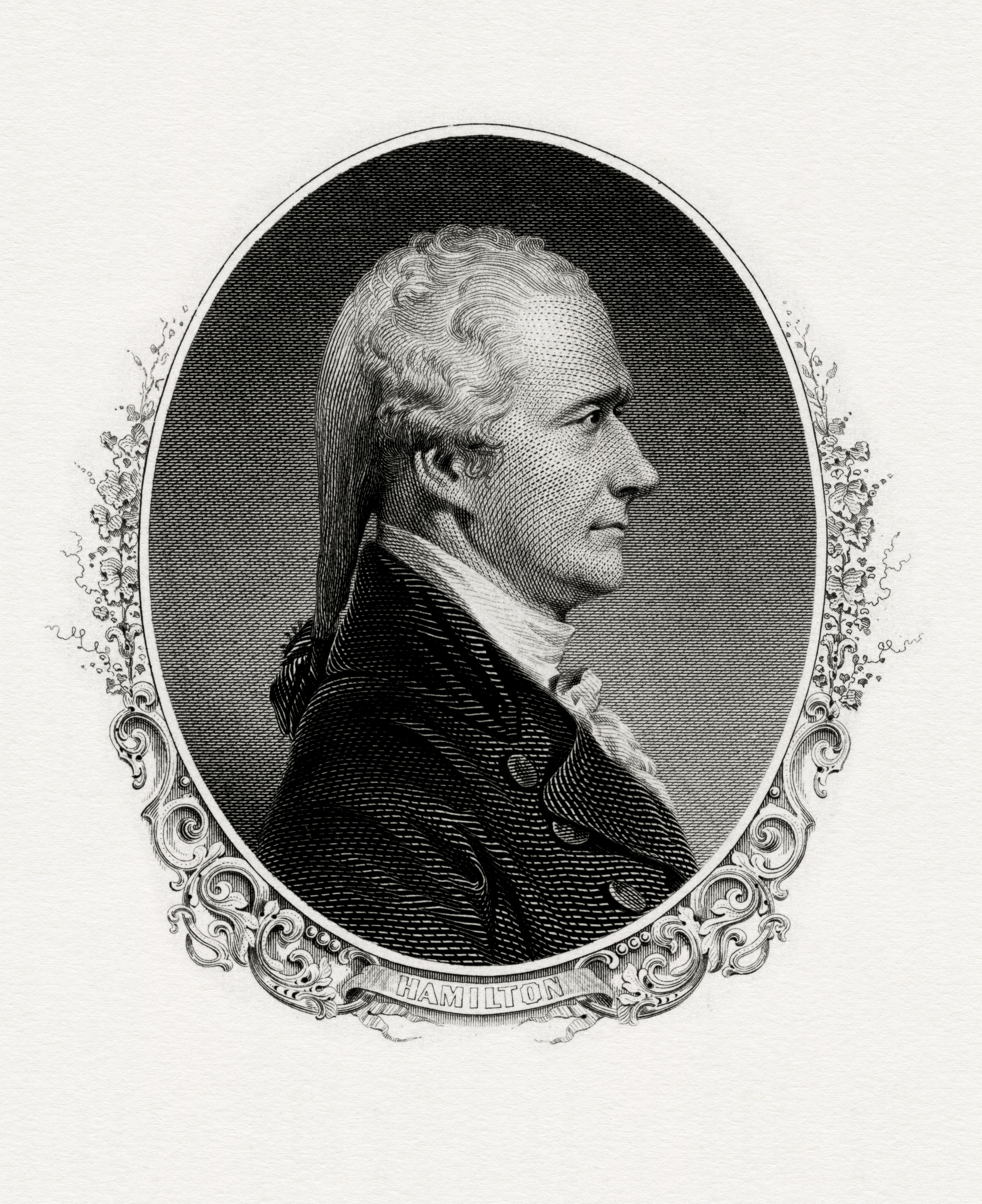
Alexander Hamilton, the first Secretary of the Treasury during the Presidency of George Washington

The national debt fell into three categories after the Revolutionary War. The first was the $12 million owed to foreigners, mostly money borrowed from France. There was general agreement to pay the foreign debts at full value. The national government owed $40 million and state governments owed $25 million to Americans who had sold food, horses, and supplies to the Patriot forces. There were also other debts which consisted of promissory notes issued during the war to soldiers, merchants, and farmers who accepted these payments on the premise that the new nation would create a government that would pay these debts eventually.

The Americans struggled to pay off the French loans; they ceased making interest payments to France in 1785 and defaulted on installments due in 1787. In 1790, however, they resumed regular payments on their debts to the French. The war expenses of the individual states added up to $114 million at the end of the conflict in 1783, compared to $37 million by the central government. In 1790, Congress combined the remaining state debts with the foreign and domestic debts into one national debt totaling $80 million at the recommendation of first Secretary of the Treasury Alexander Hamilton. Everyone received face value for wartime certificates, so that the national honor would be sustained and the national credit established.

Accounts with the French government were settled in 1795 when James Swan, an American banker acting as agent for France, helped refinance the United States' remaining debt to France. The American government issued bonds in the amount of the remaining debt and sold them publicly, with the proceeds going to France through Swan. The United States no longer owed money to foreign governments, although it continued to owe money to private investors both in the United States and in Europe. This allowed the young United States to place itself on a sound financial footing.

== Ideology and factions ==
The population of the Thirteen States was not homogeneous in political views and attitudes. Loyalties and allegiances varied widely within regions and communities and even within families, and sometimes shifted during the Revolution.

=== Ideology behind the revolution ===
The American Enlightenment was a critical precursor of the American Revolution. Chief among the ideas of the American Enlightenment were the concepts of natural law, natural rights, consent of the governed, self-determination, equality under the law, liberalism, republicanism, and intolerance of political corruption. A growing number of American colonists embraced these views and fostered an intellectual environment which led to a new sense of political and social identity.

==== Liberalism ====
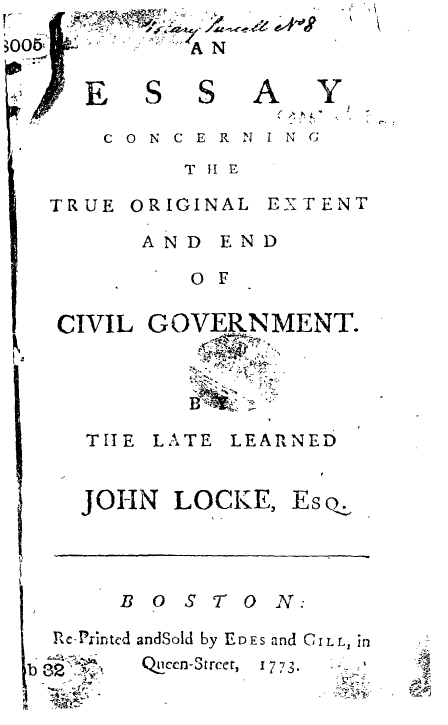
The only edition of Locke's Treatises published in colonial America during the 18th century (1773)

John Locke is often referred to as "the philosopher of the American Revolution" due to his work in the Social Contract and Natural Rights theories that underpinned the Revolution's political ideology. Locke's Two Treatises of Government published in 1689 was especially influential. He argued that all humans were created equally free, and governments therefore needed the "consent of the governed". This contrasted and conflicted sharply with the British system of inherited political power and hierarchy. In late eighteenth-century America, belief was still widespread in "equality by creation" and "rights by creation". Locke's ideas on liberty influenced the political thinking of English writers such as John Trenchard, Thomas Gordon, and Benjamin Hoadly, whose political ideas in turn also had a strong influence on the American Patriots. His work also inspired symbols used in the American Revolution such as the "Appeal to Heaven" found on the Pine Tree Flag, which alludes to Locke's concept of the right of revolution.

The theory of the social contract influenced the belief among many of the Founders that the right of the people to overthrow their leaders, should those leaders betray the historic rights of Englishmen, was one of the "natural rights" of man. The Americans heavily relied on Montesquieu's analysis of the wisdom of the "balanced" British Constitution (mixed government) in writing the state and national constitutions.

==== Republicanism ====
The American interpretation of republicanism was inspired by the Whig party in Great Britain which openly criticized the corruption within the British government. Americans were increasingly embracing republican values, seeing Britain as corrupt and hostile to American interests. Radical Whig ideology profoundly influenced colonial American political philosophy with its love of liberty and opposition to tyrannical government. The American revolutionaries associated political corruption with ostentatious luxury and inherited aristocracy.

The Founding Fathers were strong advocates of republican values, particularly Samuel Adams, Patrick Henry, John Adams, Benjamin Franklin, Thomas Jefferson, Thomas Paine, George Washington, James Madison, and Alexander Hamilton, which required men to put civic duty ahead of their personal desires. Men were honor bound by civic obligation to be prepared and willing to fight for the rights and liberties of their countrymen. John Adams wrote to Mercy Otis Warren in 1776, agreeing with some classical Greek and Roman thinkers: "Public Virtue cannot exist without private, and public Virtue is the only Foundation of Republics." He continued:

There must be a positive Passion for the public good, the public Interest, Honour, Power, and Glory, established in the Minds of the People, or there can be no Republican Government, nor any real Liberty. And this public Passion must be Superior to all private Passions. Men must be ready, they must pride themselves, and be happy to sacrifice their private Pleasures, Passions, and Interests, nay their private Friendships and dearest connections, when they Stand in Competition with the Rights of society.

==== Protestant dissenters and the Great Awakening ====
Protestant churches that had separated from the Church of England, called "dissenters", were the "school of democracy", in the words of historian Patricia Bonomi. Before the Revolution, the Southern Colonies and three of the New England Colonies had official legislatively established churches: Congregational in Massachusetts Bay, Connecticut, and New Hampshire, and the Church of England in Maryland, Virginia, North-Carolina, South Carolina, and Georgia. The colonies of New York, New Jersey, Pennsylvania, Delaware, and the Colony of Rhode Island and Providence Plantations had no officially established churches. Church membership statistics from the period are unreliable and scarce, but what little data exists indicates that the Church of England was not in the majority, not even in the colonies where it was the established church, and they probably did not comprise even 30 percent of the population in most localities (with the possible exception of Virginia).

John Witherspoon, who was considered a "new light" Presbyterian, wrote widely circulated sermons linking the American Revolution to the teachings of the Bible. Throughout the colonies, dissenting ministers from the Congregational, Baptist, and Presbyterian churches preached Revolutionary themes in their sermons while most Church of England clergymen preached loyalty to the king, the titular head of the English state church. Religious motivation for fighting tyranny transcended socioeconomic lines. The Declaration of Independence also referred to the "Laws of Nature and of Nature's God" as justification for the Revolution: the signers of the Declaration professed their "firm reliance on the Protection of divine Providence", and they appealed to "the Supreme Judge for the rectitude of our intentions".

Historian Bernard Bailyn argues that the evangelicalism of the era challenged traditional notions of natural hierarchy by preaching that the Bible teaches all men are equal, and the true value of a man therefore lies in his moral behavior, not in his class. Kidd argues that religious disestablishment, belief in God as the source of human rights, and shared convictions about sin, virtue, and divine providence, worked together to unite rationalists and evangelicals and thus encouraged a large proportion of Americans to fight for sovereignty outside the Empire. Bailyn, on the other hand, denies that religion played such a critical role. Alan Heimert argues that New Light anti-authoritarianism was essential to furthering democracy in colonial American society, and set the stage for a confrontation with British monarchical and aristocratic rule.

=== Class and psychology of the factions ===
Historians in the early 20th century such as J. Franklin Jameson examined the class composition of the Patriot cause, looking for evidence of a class war inside the revolution. More recent historians have largely abandoned that interpretation, emphasizing instead the high level of ideological unity. Both Loyalists and Patriots were a "mixed lot", but ideological demands always came first.

==== King George III ====
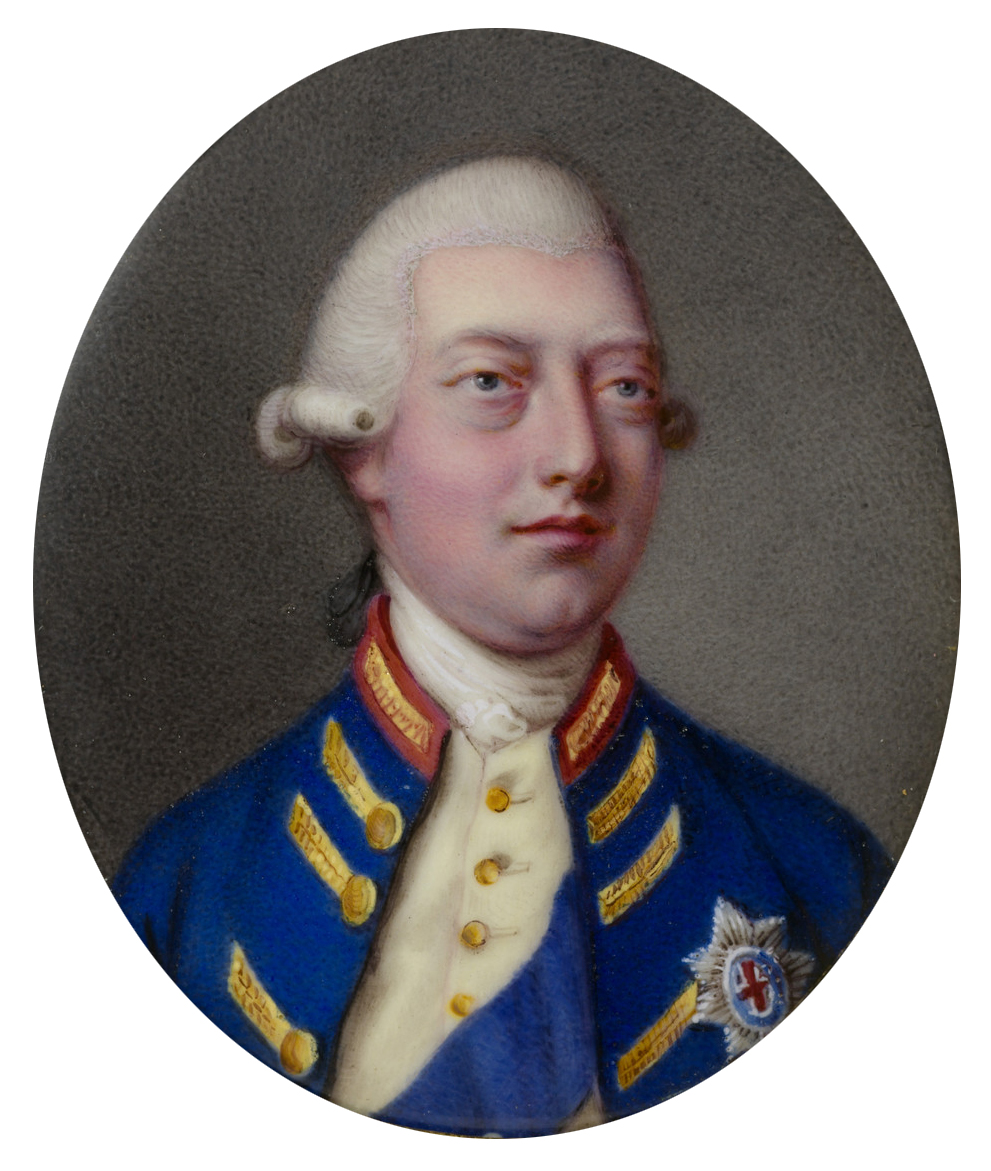
King George III depicted in a 1781 portrait

The revolution became a personal issue for the king, fueled by his growing belief that British leniency would be taken as weakness by the Americans. He also sincerely believed that he was defending Britain's constitution against usurpers, rather than opposing patriots fighting for their natural rights. King George III is often accused of obstinately trying to keep Great Britain at war with the revolutionaries in America, despite the opinions of his own ministers. In the words of the British historian George Otto Trevelyan, the King was determined "never to acknowledge the independence of the Americans, and to punish their contumacy by the indefinite prolongation of a war which promised to be eternal." The king wanted to "keep the rebels harassed, anxious, and poor, until the day when, by a natural and inevitable process, discontent and disappointment were converted into penitence and remorse". Later historians defend George by saying in the context of the times no king would willingly surrender such a large territory, and his conduct was far less ruthless than contemporary monarchs in Europe. After the surrender of a British army at Saratoga, both Parliament and the British people were largely in favor of the war; recruitment ran at high levels and although political opponents were vocal, they remained a small minority.

With the early setbacks in America, Lord North asked to transfer power to Lord Chatham, whom he thought more capable, but George refused to do so; he suggested instead that Chatham serve as a subordinate minister in North's administration, but Chatham refused. He died later in the same year. Lord North was allied to the "King's Friends" faction in Parliament and believed George III had the right to exercise extensive powers. In early 1778, Britain's chief rival France signed a treaty of alliance with the United States, and the confrontation soon escalated from a "rebellion" to something that has been characterized as "world war". The French fleet was able to outrun the British naval blockade of the Mediterranean and sailed to North America. The conflict now affected North America, Europe and India. The United States and France were joined by Spain in 1779 and the Dutch Republic, while Britain had no major allies of its own, except for the Loyalist minority in America and German auxiliaries (i.e. Hessians). Lord Gower and Lord Weymouth both resigned from the government. Lord North again requested that he also be allowed to resign, but he stayed in office at George III's insistence. Opposition to the costly war was increasing, and in June 1780 contributed to disturbances in London known as the Gordon riots.

As late as the Siege of Charleston in 1780, Loyalists could still believe in their eventual victory, as British troops inflicted defeats on the Continental forces at the Battle of Camden and the Battle of Guilford Court House. In late 1781, the news of Cornwallis's surrender at the siege of Yorktown reached London; Lord North's parliamentary support ebbed away and he resigned the following year. The king drafted an abdication notice, which was never delivered, finally accepted the defeat in North America, and authorized peace negotiations. The Treaties of Paris, by which Britain recognized the sovereignty of the United States and returned Florida to Spain, were signed in 1782 and 1783 respectively. In early 1783, George III privately conceded "America is lost!" He reflected that the former colonies had developed into Britain's "successful rivals" in commercial trade and fishing as the United States.

When John Adams was appointed American Minister to London in 1785, George had become resigned to the new relationship between his country and the former colonies. He told Adams, "I was the last to consent to the separation; but the separation having been made and having become inevitable, I have always said, as I say now, that I would be the first to meet the friendship of the United States as an independent power."

==== Patriots ====
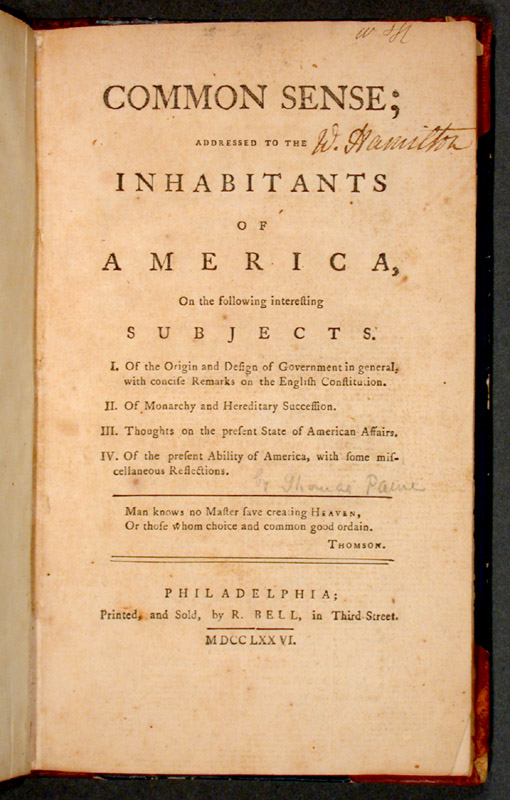
The U.S. motto Novus ordo seclorum, meaning "A New Age Now Begins", is paraphrased from Thomas Paine's Common Sense, published January 10, 1776. "We have it in our power to begin the world over again," Paine wrote.

Those who fought for independence were called "Revolutionaries", "Continentals", "Rebels", "Patriots", "Whigs", "Congress-men", or "Americans" during and after the war. They included a full range of social and economic classes but were unanimous regarding the need to defend the natural rights of Americans and uphold the principles of republicanism in rejecting monarchy and aristocracy, while emphasizing civic virtue by citizens. The signers of the Declaration of Independence were overwhelmingly—with definite exceptions—well-educated, of British stock, and of the Protestant faith. Newspapers were strongholds of patriotism (although there were a few Loyalist papers) and printed many pamphlets, announcements, patriotic letters, and pronouncements.

According to historian Robert Calhoon, 40 to 45 percent of the white population in the Thirteen Colonies supported the Patriots' cause, 15 to 20 percent supported the Loyalists, and the remainder were neutral or kept a low profile. Mark Lender concludes that ordinary people became insurgents against the British because they held a sense of rights which the British were violating, rights that stressed local autonomy, fair dealing, and government by consent. They were highly sensitive to the issue of tyranny, which they saw manifested in the British response to the Boston Tea Party. The arrival in Boston of the British Army heightened their sense of violated rights, leading to rage and demands for revenge. They had faith that God was on their side.

The Patriots viewed independence as a means to gain freedom from British oppression and initially to reassert their rights on par with subjects in Britain. Most yeomen farmers, craftsmen, and small merchants joined the Patriot cause to demand more political equality. They were especially successful in Pennsylvania but less so in New England, where John Adams attacked Thomas Paine's Common Sense for the "absurd democratical notions" that it proposed.

Thomas Paine published his pamphlet Common Sense in January 1776, after the Revolution had started. It was widely distributed and often read aloud in taverns, contributing significantly to concurrently spreading the ideas of republicanism and liberalism, bolstering enthusiasm for separation from Great Britain, and encouraging recruitment for the Continental Army. Paine presented the Revolution as the solution for Americans alarmed by the threat of tyranny.

==== Loyalists ====
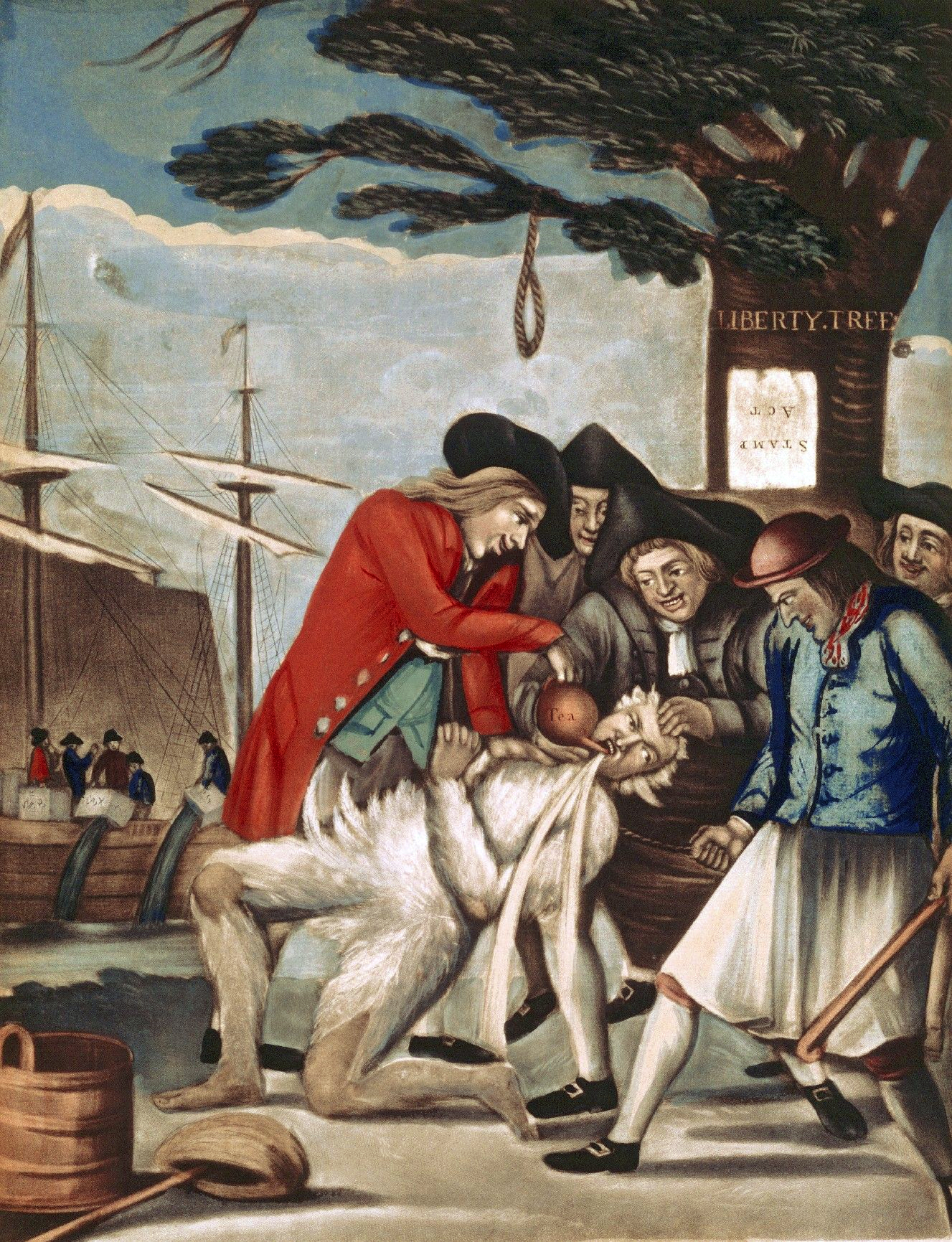
Patriots tarring and feathering Loyalist John Malcolm depicted in a 1774 painting

The consensus of scholars is that about 15 to 20 percent of the white population remained loyal to the British Crown. Those who actively supported the king were known at the time as "Loyalists", "Tories", or "King's men". The Loyalists never controlled territory unless the British Army occupied it. They were typically older, less willing to break with old loyalties, and often connected to the Church of England; they included many established merchants with strong business connections throughout the Empire, as well as royal officials such as Thomas Hutchinson of Boston.

In the mid-20th century, historian Leonard Woods Labaree identified eight characteristics of the Loyalists that made them essentially conservative, opposite to the characteristics of the Patriots. Loyalists tended to feel that resistance to the Crown was morally wrong, while the Patriots thought that morality was on their side. Loyalists were alienated when the Patriots resorted to violence, such as burning houses and tarring and feathering. Many Loyalists wanted to take a centrist position and resisted the Patriots' demand to declare their opposition to the Crown. Numerous Loyalists had maintained strong and long-standing relations with Britain, especially merchants in port cities such as New York and Boston. Many Loyalists felt that independence was bound to come eventually, but they were fearful that revolution might lead to anarchy, tyranny, or mob rule. In contrast, the prevailing attitude among Patriots was a desire to seize the initiative. Labaree also contended that Loyalists were pessimists who lacked the confidence in the future displayed by the Patriots.

There were "tens of thousands" of Black Loyalists, enslaved African Americans who escaped to British lines and supported Britain's cause via several means. Many of them died from disease, but the survivors were evacuated by the British to their remaining colonies in North America. Those enslaved by Loyalists remained in bondage

The revolution could divide families, such as William Franklin, son of Benjamin Franklin and royal governor of the Province of New Jersey who remained loyal to the Crown throughout the war. He and his father never spoke again. Recent immigrants who had not been fully Americanized were also inclined to support the King.

After the war, the great majority of the half-million Loyalists remained in America and resumed normal lives. Some became prominent American leaders, such as Samuel Seabury. Approximately 46,000 Loyalists relocated to Canada; others moved to Britain (7,000), Florida, or the West Indies (9,000). The exiles represented approximately two percent of the total population of the colonies. Nearly all Black Loyalists left for Nova Scotia, Florida, or England, where they could remain free. Loyalists who left the South in 1783 took thousands of enslaved persons with them as they fled to the British West Indies.

==== Neutrals ====
A minority of uncertain size tried to stay neutral in the war. Most kept a low profile, but the Quakers were the most important group to speak out for neutrality, especially in Pennsylvania. The Quakers continued to do business with the British even after the war began, and they were accused of supporting British rule, "contrivers and authors of seditious publications" critical of the revolutionary cause. Most Quakers remained neutral, although a sizeable number participated to some degree.

==== Roles of women ====
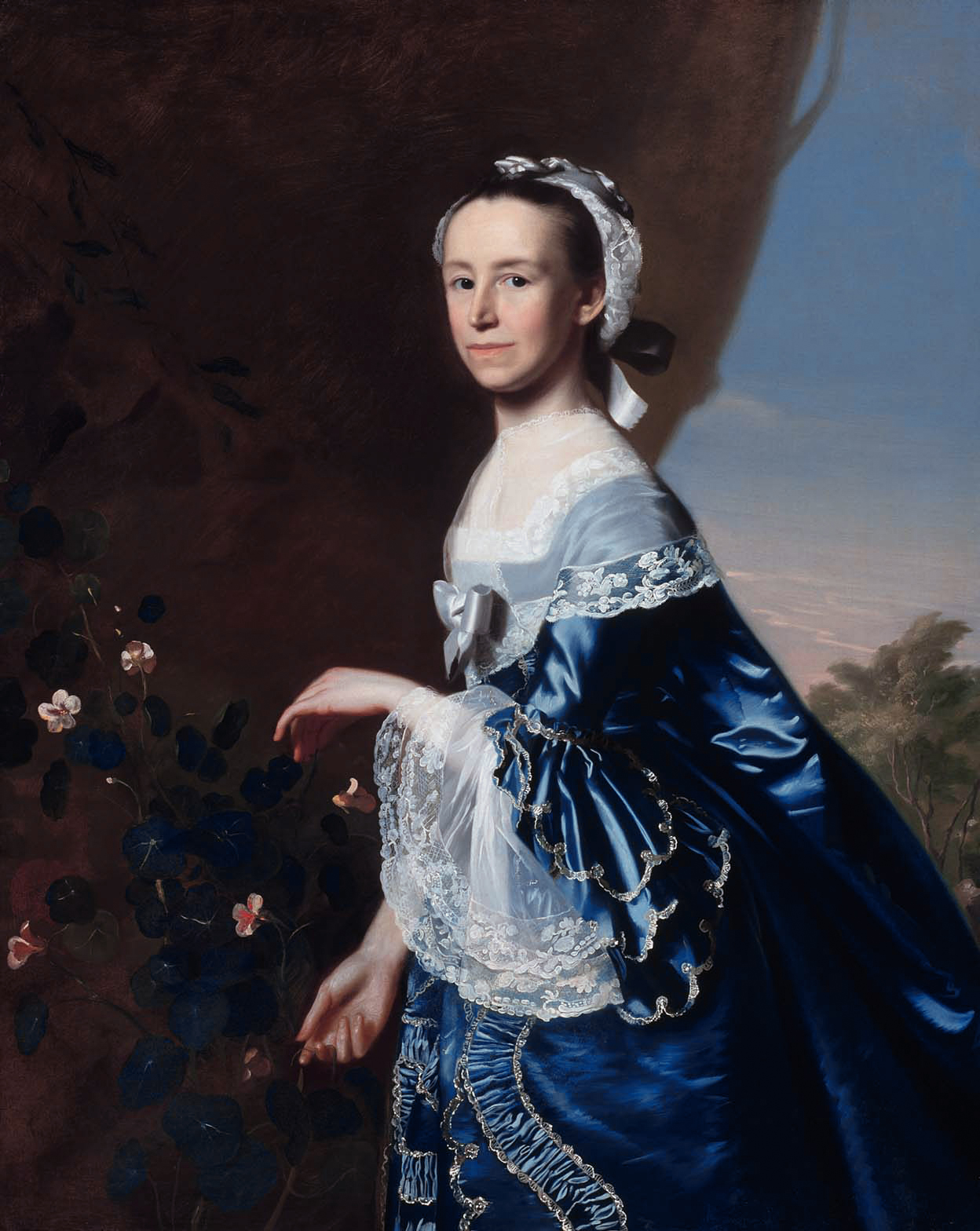
Mercy Otis Warren published poems and plays that attacked royal authority and urged colonists to resist British rule.

Women contributed to the American Revolution in many ways and were involved on both sides. Formal politics did not include women, but ordinary domestic behaviors became charged with political significance as Patriot women confronted a war which permeated all aspects of political, civil, and domestic life. They participated by boycotting British goods, spying on the British, following armies as they marched, washing, cooking, and mending for soldiers, delivering secret messages, and even fighting disguised as men in a few cases, such as Deborah Samson. Mercy Otis Warren held meetings in her house and cleverly attacked Loyalists with her creative plays and histories. Many women also acted as nurses and helpers, tending to the soldiers' wounds and buying and selling goods for them. Some of these camp followers even participated in combat, such as Madam John Turchin who led her husband's regiment into battle. Above all, women continued the agricultural work at home to feed their families and the armies. They maintained their families during their husbands' absences and sometimes after their deaths.

American women were integral to the success of the boycott of British goods, as the boycotted items were largely household articles such as tea and cloth. Women had to return to knitting goods and to spinning and weaving their own cloth—skills that had fallen into disuse. In 1769, the women of Boston produced 40,000 skeins of yarn, and 180 women in Middletown, Massachusetts wove 20,522 yards (18,765 m) of cloth. Many women gathered food, money, clothes, and other supplies during the war to help the soldiers. A woman's loyalty to her husband could become an open political act, especially for women in America committed to men who remained loyal to the King. Legal divorce, usually rare, was granted to Patriot women whose husbands supported the King.

=== Other participants ===
==== France and Spain ====
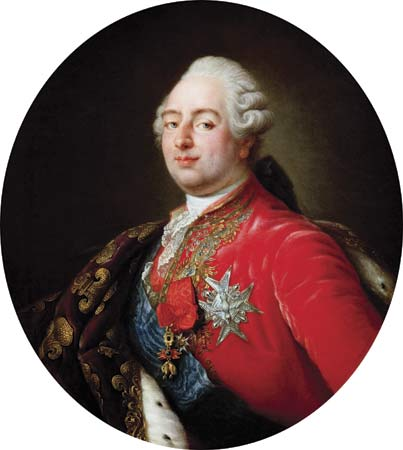
Louis XVI, King of France and Navarre

In early 1776, France set up a major program of aid to the Americans, and the Spanish secretly added funds. Each country spent one million "livres tournaises" to buy munitions. A dummy corporation run by Pierre Beaumarchais concealed their activities. American Patriots obtained some munitions from the Dutch Republic as well, through the French and Spanish ports in the West Indies. Heavy expenditures and a weak taxation system pushed France toward bankruptcy.

In 1777, Charles François Adrien le Paulmier, Chevalier d'Annemours, acting as a secret agent for France, made sure General George Washington was privy to his mission. He followed Congress around for the next two years, reporting what he observed back to France. The Treaty of Alliance between the French and the Americans followed in 1778, which led to more French money, matériel and troops being sent to the United States.

Spain did not officially recognize the United States, but it was a French ally and it separately declared war on Britain on June 21, 1779. Bernardo de Gálvez, general of the Spanish forces in New Spain bordering the Americans, also served as governor of Louisiana. He led an expedition of colonial troops to capture Florida from the British and to keep open a vital conduit for supplies going to the Americans.

==== Germans ====
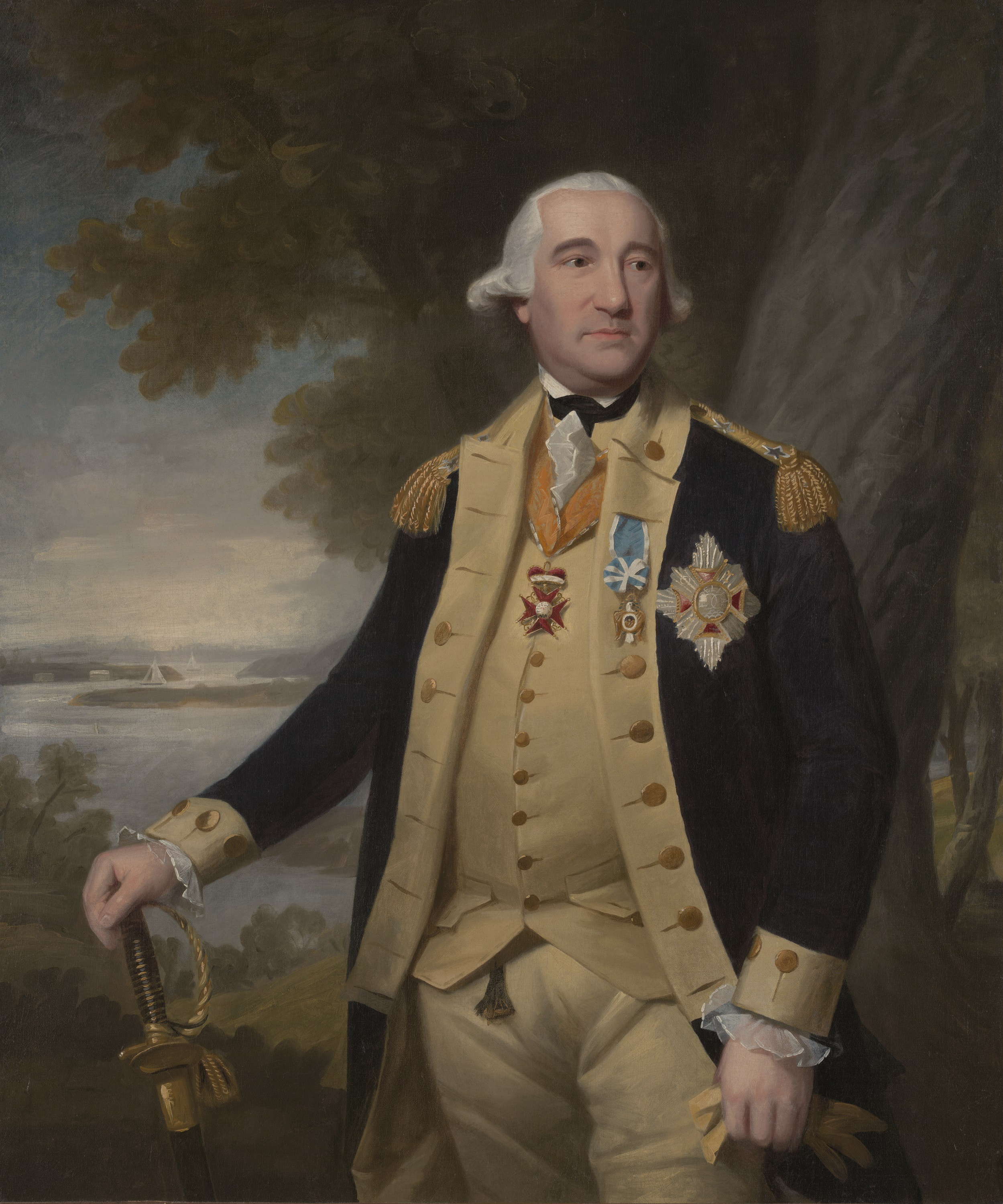
Friedrich Wilhelm von Steuben was a former Prussian Army officer who served as inspector general of the Continental Army during the American Revolutionary War. He is credited with teaching the Continental Army the essentials of military drill and discipline beginning at Valley Forge in 1778, considered a turning point for the Americans.

Ethnic Germans served on both sides of the American Revolutionary War. As George III was also the Elector of Hanover, many supported the Loyalist cause and served as allies of the Kingdom of Great Britain; most notably rented auxiliary troops from German states such as the Landgraviate of Hessen-Kassel.

American Patriots tended to represent such troops as mercenaries in propaganda against the British Crown. Even American historians followed suit, in spite of Colonial-era jurists drawing a distinction between auxiliaries and mercenaries, with auxiliaries serving their prince when sent to the aid of another prince, and mercenaries serving a foreign prince as individuals. By this distinction the troops which served in the American Revolution were auxiliaries.

Other German individuals came to assist the American revolutionaries, most notably Friedrich Wilhelm von Steuben, who served as a general in the Continental Army and is credited with professionalizing that force, but most Germans who served were already colonists. Von Steuben's native Prussia joined the League of Armed Neutrality, and King Frederick II of Prussia was well appreciated in the United States for his support early in the war. He expressed interest in opening trade with the United States and bypassing English ports, and allowed an American agent to buy arms in Prussia. Frederick predicted American success, and promised to recognize the United States and American diplomats once France did the same. Prussia also interfered in the recruiting efforts of Russia and neighboring German states when they raised armies to send to the Americas, and Frederick II forbade enlistment for the American war within Prussia. All Prussian roads were denied to troops from Anhalt-Zerbst, which delayed reinforcements that Howe had hoped to receive during the winter of 1777–1778.

However, when the War of the Bavarian Succession (1778–1779) erupted, Frederick II became much more cautious with Prussian/British relations. U.S. ships were denied access to Prussian ports, and Frederick refused to officially recognize the United States until they had signed the Treaty of Paris. Even after the war, Frederick II predicted that the United States was too large to operate as a republic, and that it would soon rejoin the British Empire with representatives in Parliament.

==== Native Americans ====
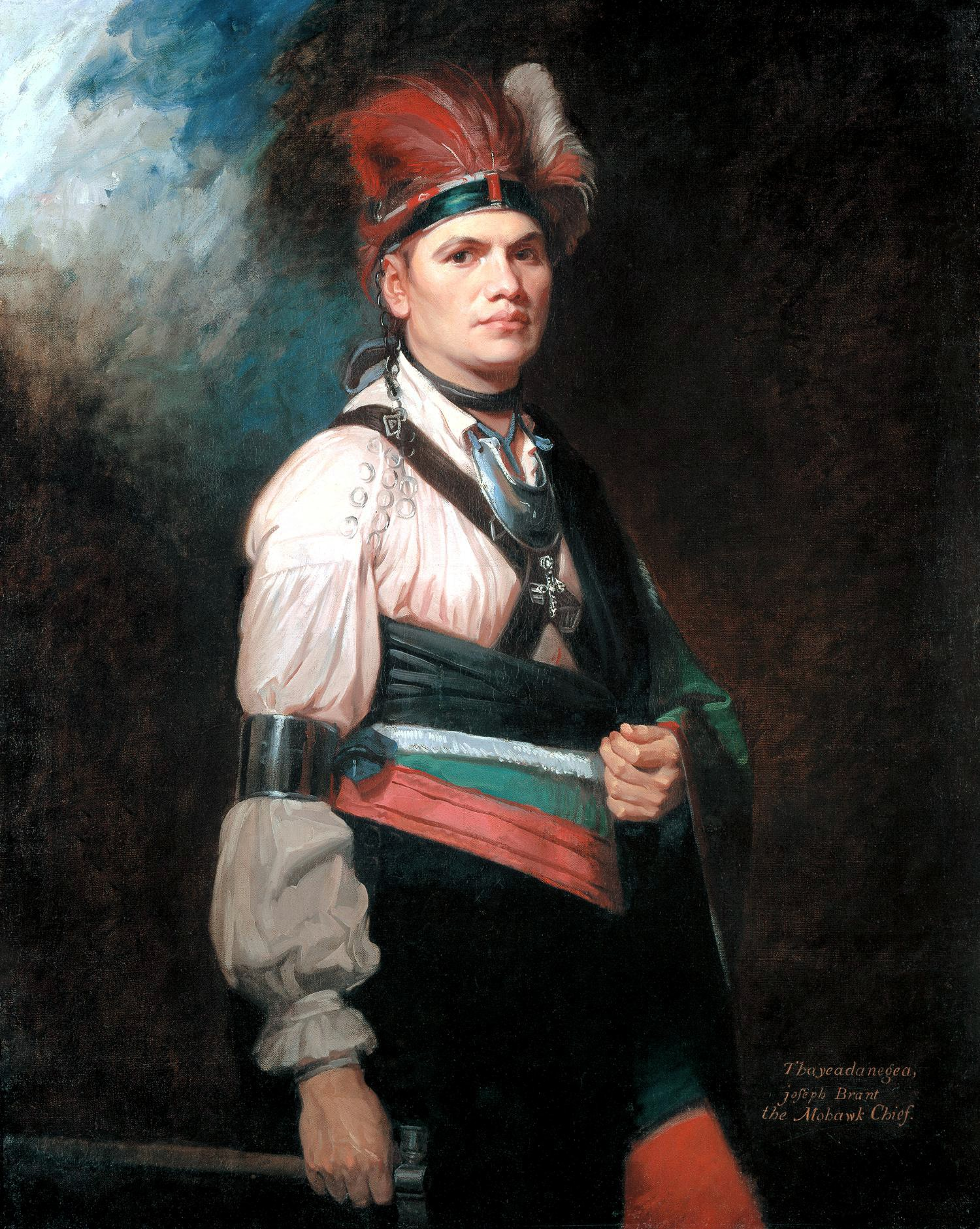
Thayendanegea, a Mohawk military and political leader, was the most prominent indigenous leader opposing the Patriot forces.

Most Indigenous people rejected pleas that they remain neutral and instead supported the British Crown. The great majority of the ~200,000 indigenous people east of the Mississippi distrusted the Americans and supported the British cause, hoping to forestall continued expansion of settlement into their territories. Those tribes closely involved in trade tended to side with the Patriots, although political factors were important as well. Some tried to remain neutral, seeing little value in joining what they perceived to be a "white man's war", and fearing reprisals from whichever side they opposed.

The great majority of indigenous people did not participate directly in the war, with the notable exceptions of warriors and bands associated with four of the Haudenosaunee Confederacy (also Iroquois) tribes in New York and Pennsylvania which allied with the British, and the Oneida and Tuscarora tribes among the Iroquois of central and western New York who supported the American cause. The British did have other indigenous allies, particularly in the regions of southwest Quebec on the Patriot's frontier. The British provided arms to Indigenous people who were led by Loyalists in war parties to raid frontier settlements from the Carolinas to New York. These war parties killed many settlers on the frontier, especially in western Pennsylvania and New York's Mohawk Valley.

In 1776, Cherokee war parties attacked American settlers all along the southern Quebec frontier of the uplands throughout the Washington District, North Carolina (now Tennessee) and the Kentucky wilderness area. The Chickamauga Cherokee under Tsiyu Gansini (also Dragging Canoe) allied themselves closely with the British, and fought on for an additional decade after the Treaty of Paris was signed. They launched raids with roughly 200 warriors, as seen in the Cherokee–American wars; they could not mobilize enough forces to invade settler areas without the help of allies, most often the Creek.

Joseph Brant (also Thayendanegea), from the powerful Mohawk tribe of the Haudenosaunee Confederacy, was the most prominent Indigenous leader against the Patriot forces. In 1778 and 1780, he led 300 Iroquois warriors and 100 white Loyalists in multiple attacks on small frontier settlements in New York and Pennsylvania, killing many settlers and destroying villages, crops, and food stockpiles.

In 1779, the Continental Army forced the hostile Indigenous people out of upstate New York when Washington sent an army under John Sullivan which destroyed 40 evacuated Iroquois villages in central and western New York. The Battle of Newtown proved decisive, as the Patriots had an advantage of three-to-one, and it ended significant resistance; there was little combat otherwise. Facing starvation and homeless for the winter, the Iroquois that allied with the British fled to Canada.

At the peace conference following the war, the British ceded indigenous lands without consultation with their allies that inhabited them. They transferred control to the United States of all the land south of the Great Lakes, east of the Mississippi, and north of Florida. Calloway concludes:

Burned villages and crops, murdered chiefs, divided councils and civil wars, migrations, towns and forts choked with refugees, economic disruption, breaking of ancient traditions, losses in battle and to disease and hunger, betrayal to their enemies, all made the American Revolution one of the darkest periods in American Indian history.

==== Black Americans ====
Crispus Attucks, a (c. 1943) portrait by Herschel Levit depicts Attucks, who is considered to be the first American to die for the cause of independence in the Revolution.

The existence of slavery in the American colonies had attracted criticism from both sides of the Atlantic as many could not reconcile the existence of the institution with the egalitarian ideals espoused by leaders of the Revolution. In a text opposing the grievances of the colonists, the English writer Samuel Johnson wrote: "how is it we hear the loudest yelps for liberty among the drivers of the Negroes?". Referring to this contradiction, the English writer and abolitionist Thomas Day wrote in a 1776 letter that:

if there be an object truly ridiculous in nature, it is an American patriot, signing resolutions of independency with the one hand, and with the other brandishing a whip over his affrighted slaves.

Crispus Attucks, of mixed racial heritage, was one of the five people killed in the Boston Massacre in 1770 and is considered the first American casualty for the cause of independence. Free Blacks in the New England Colonies and Middle Colonies in the North as well as Southern Colonies fought on both sides of the War, but the majority fought for the Patriots. Gary Nash reports that there were about 9,000 Black veteran Patriots, counting the Continental Army and Navy, state militia units, privateers, wagoneers in the Army, servants to officers, and spies. Ray Raphael notes that thousands did join the Loyalist cause, but "a far larger number, free as well as slave, tried to further their interests by siding with the patriots."

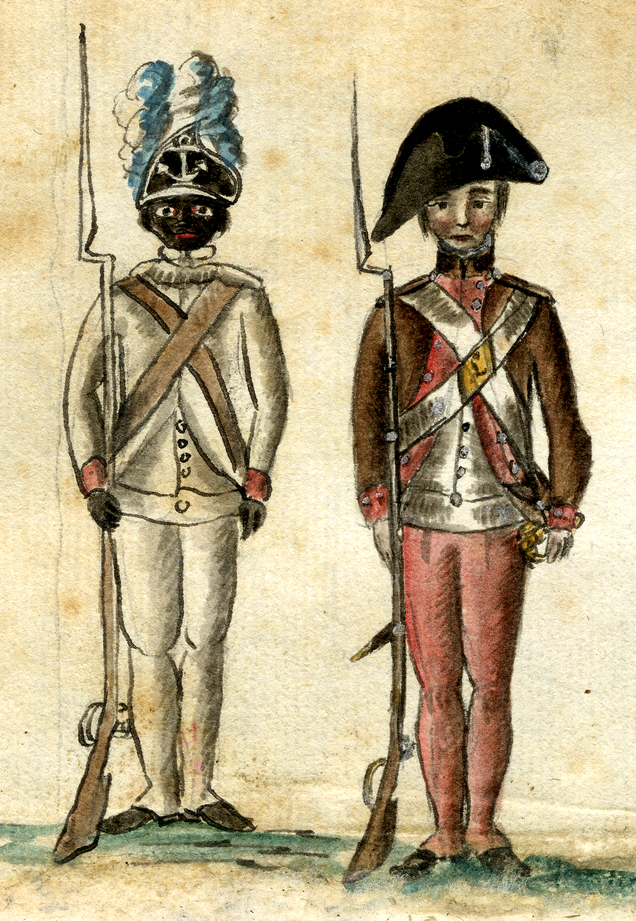
A Black soldier of the 1st Rhode Island Regiment, widely regarded as the first Black battalion in U.S. military history

The effects of the war were more dramatic in the South. Tens of thousands of enslaved persons escaped to British lines throughout the South, causing dramatic losses to slaveholders and disrupting cultivation and harvesting of crops. For instance, South Carolina was estimated to have lost about 25,000 enslaved persons to flight, migration, or death which amounted to a third of its enslaved population. As noted by the historian Karen Cook Bell, during the Revolutionary War roughly one-third of all the escaped enslaved were women, even though prior to 1775 nearly 87% had been men.

During the war, British commanders attempted to weaken the Patriots by issuing proclamations of freedom to their enslaved. In the November 1775 document known as Dunmore's Proclamation Virginia royal governor, Lord Dunmore recruited Black men for British military service with the promise of freedom, protection for their families, and land grants. Hundreds of Black men responded and were formed into the Royal Ethiopian Regiment. However, as noted by the historian James Corbett David, many Black people felt unable or unwilling to respond to these offers of freedom:

Under... discouraging circumstances, the vast majority of slaves were either unable or unwilling to take their chances with the British. Those who opted not to run (many never really had a choice) may have watched events unfold with a growing sense of vindication, for the slaves who did strike out for freedom, while exhibiting remarkable courage and ingenuity in the process, had an exceptionally hard road ahead.

Colonists, primarily Southern Patriots, were deeply angered by Dunmore's proclamation, which spread through all of the Thirteen Colonies and threatened to upturn the existing American racial hierarchy; it also played a major role in Southern support for American independence. Accusations that the British were encouraging slave rebellions were prominent features of Patriot propaganda, with Jefferson even accusing George III in the 27 colonial grievances of having "excited domestic Insurrections among us". The historian Simon Schama argued that for Southern Patriots, "Theirs was a revolution, first and foremost, mobilized to protect slavery."

The 1779 Philipsburg Proclamation expanded the promise of freedom for Black men who enlisted in the British military to all the colonies in rebellion. At the conclusion of the war, British forces gave transportation to 10,000 of the formerly enslaved when they evacuated Savannah and Charles Town, carrying through on their promise. They evacuated and resettled more than 3,000 Black Loyalists from New York to Nova Scotia, Upper Canada, and Lower Canada. Others sailed with the British to England or were resettled as freedmen in the West Indies of the Caribbean. But the enslaved carried to the Caribbean under control of Loyalist masters generally remained enslaved until the British abolition of slavery in its colonies in 1833–1838.

More than 1,200 of the Black Loyalists of Nova Scotia later resettled in the British colony of Sierra Leone in Africa, where they became leaders of the Krio ethnic group of Freetown and the later national government. Many of their descendants still live in Sierra Leone, as well as other African countries. Despite the turmoil of the period, African-Americans contributed to the foundation of an American national identity during the Revolution. Phyllis Wheatley, an African American poet, popularized the image of Columbia to represent America.

== Effects of the revolution ==
After the Revolution, genuinely democratic politics became possible in the former American colonies. The rights of the people were incorporated into state constitutions. Concepts of liberty, consent of the governed, individual rights, equality and due process under the law, and intolerance of corruption became incorporated as core values of liberal republicanism. The new United States government was empowered to undertake its own project of territorial expansion and settler colonialism. The greatest challenge to the old order in Europe was the challenge to inherited political power and the democratic idea that government rests on the consent of the governed. The example of the first successful revolution against a European empire, and the first successful establishment of a republican form of democratically elected government without monarchy or any inherited political authority, provided a model for many other colonial peoples who realized that they too could break away and become self-governing nations with directly elected representative government.

Losing the war and the Thirteen Colonies was a shock to Britain. The war revealed the limitations of Britain's fiscal-military state when they discovered that they suddenly faced powerful enemies with no allies, and they were dependent on extended and vulnerable transatlantic lines of communication. The defeat heightened dissension and escalated political antagonism to the king's ministers. The king went so far as to draft letters of abdication, although they were never delivered. Inside Parliament, the primary concern changed from fears of an over-mighty monarch to the issues of representation, parliamentary reform, and government retrenchment. Unable to accept loss of the war and the colonies as possibly due to anything else but widespread institutional corruption, reformers sought to root it out, and the result was a crisis from 1776 to 1783. The crisis ended after 1784 confidence in the British constitution was restored during the administration of Prime Minister William Pitt. (Note: Some historians suggest that loss of the American colonies enabled Britain to deal with the French Revolution with more unity and better organization than would otherwise have been the case. Britain turned towards Asia, the Pacific, and later Africa with subsequent exploration leading to the rise of the Second British Empire.)

=== Interpretations ===
John Adams concluded in 1818:

The Revolution was effected before the war commenced. The Revolution was in the minds and hearts of the people .... This radical change in the principles, opinions, sentiments, and affections of the people was the real American Revolution.

The American Revolution ended an age of monarchy, and it began a new age of freedom. As a result of the growing wave started by the Revolution, there are now more people around the world living in freedom than ever before, both in absolute numbers and as a percentage of the world's population. Interpretations vary concerning the effect of the Revolution. Historians such as Bernard Bailyn, Gordon Wood, and Edmund Morgan view it as a unique and radical event which produced deep changes and had a profound effect on world affairs, such as an increasing belief in the principles of the Enlightenment. These were demonstrated by a leadership and government that espoused protection of natural rights, and a system of laws chosen by the people. John Murrin, by contrast, argues that the definition of "the people" at that time was mostly restricted to free men who passed a property qualification.

Gordon Wood states:

The American Revolution was integral to the changes occurring in American society, politics and culture .... These changes were radical, and they were extensive .... The Revolution not only radically changed the personal and social relationships of people, including the position of women, but also destroyed aristocracy as it'd been understood in the Western world for at least two millennia.

Edmund Morgan has argued that, in terms of long-term impact on American society and values:

The Revolution did revolutionize social relations. It did displace the deference, the patronage, the social divisions that had determined the way people viewed one another for centuries and still view one another in much of the world. It did give to ordinary people a pride and power, not to say an arrogance, that have continued to shock visitors from less favored lands. It may have left standing a host of inequalities that have troubled us ever since. But it generated the egalitarian view of human society that makes them troubling and makes our world so different from the one in which the revolutionists had grown up.

Leopold von Ranke, a leading German historian, claimed in 1848 that revolutionary American republicanism played a crucial role in the development of European liberalism:

By abandoning English constitutionalism and creating a new republic based on the rights of the individual, the North Americans introduced a new force in the world. Ideas spread most rapidly when they have found adequate concrete expression. Thus republicanism entered our Romanic/Germanic world... Up to this point, the conviction had prevailed in Europe that monarchy best served the interests of the nation. Now the idea spread that the nation should govern itself. But only after a state had actually been formed on the basis of the theory of representation did the full significance of this idea become clear. All later revolutionary movements have this same goal... This was the complete reversal of a principle. Until then, a king who ruled by the grace of God had been the center around which everything turned. Now the idea emerged that power should come from below... These two principles are like two opposite poles, and it is the conflict between them that determines the course of the modern world. In Europe the conflict between them had not yet taken on concrete form; with the French Revolution it did.

=== Inspiring other independence movements and revolutions ===
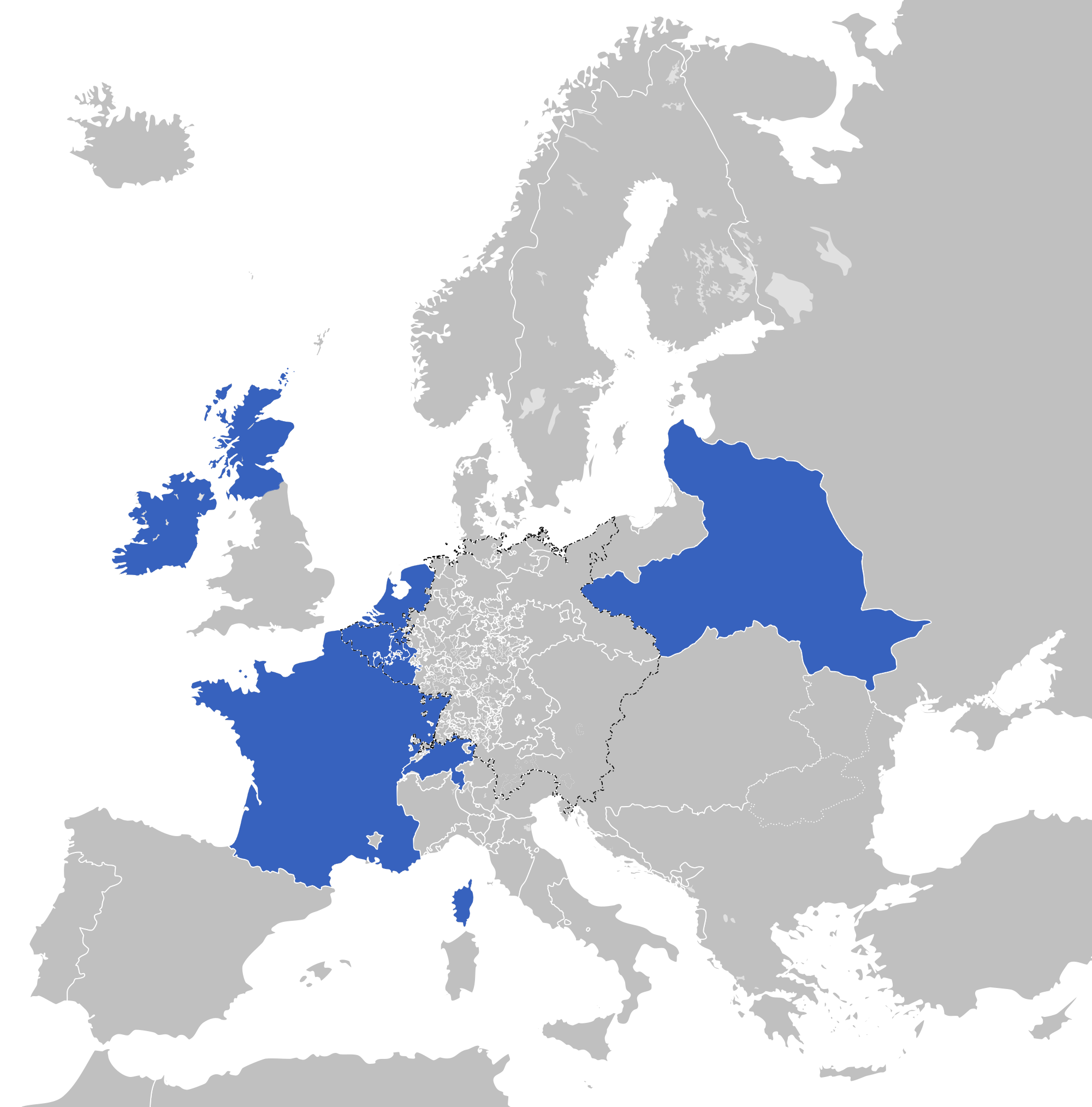
The American Revolution was first of the original wave of the Atlantic Revolutions, an 18th and 19th century revolutionary wave in the Atlantic World.

The first shot of the American Revolution at the Battle of Lexington and Concord is referred to as the "shot heard 'round the world". The Revolutionary War victory not only established the United States as the first nation founded on the consent of the governed, equality under the law, and modern constitutional republic, but marked the transition from an age of monarchy to a new age of freedom by inspiring similar movements worldwide. The American Revolution was the first of the Atlantic Revolutions: followed most notably by the French Revolution, the Haitian Revolution, and the Latin American wars of independence. Aftershocks contributed to rebellions in Ireland, the Polish–Lithuanian Commonwealth, and the Netherlands.

The U.S. Constitution, drafted shortly after independence, remains the world's oldest written constitution, and has been emulated by other countries, in some cases verbatim. Some historians and scholars argue that the subsequent wave of independence and revolutionary movements has contributed to the continued expansion of democratic government; 144 countries, representing two-third of the world's population, are full or partially democracies of some form.

The Revolution had a strong, immediate influence in Great Britain, Ireland, the Netherlands, and France. Many British and Irish Whigs in Parliament spoke glowingly in favor of the American cause. In Ireland, the Protestant minority who controlled Ireland demanded self-rule. Under the leadership of Henry Grattan, the Irish Patriot Party forced the reversal of mercantilist prohibitions against trade with other British colonies. The King and his cabinet in London could not risk another rebellion, and so made a series of concessions to the Patriot faction in Dublin. Armed volunteer units of the Protestant Ascendancy were set up ostensibly to protect against an invasion from France. As had been in colonial America, so too in Ireland now the King no longer had a monopoly of lethal force. By 1798, the Irish were ready for a republican uprising.

The American Declaration of Independence influenced the French Declaration of the Rights of Man and of the Citizen of 1789. The spirit of the Declaration of Independence led to laws ending slavery in all the Northern states and the Northwest Territory, with New Jersey the last in 1804. States such as New Jersey and New York adopted gradual emancipation, which kept some people as slaves for more than two decades longer.

=== Status of African Americans ===
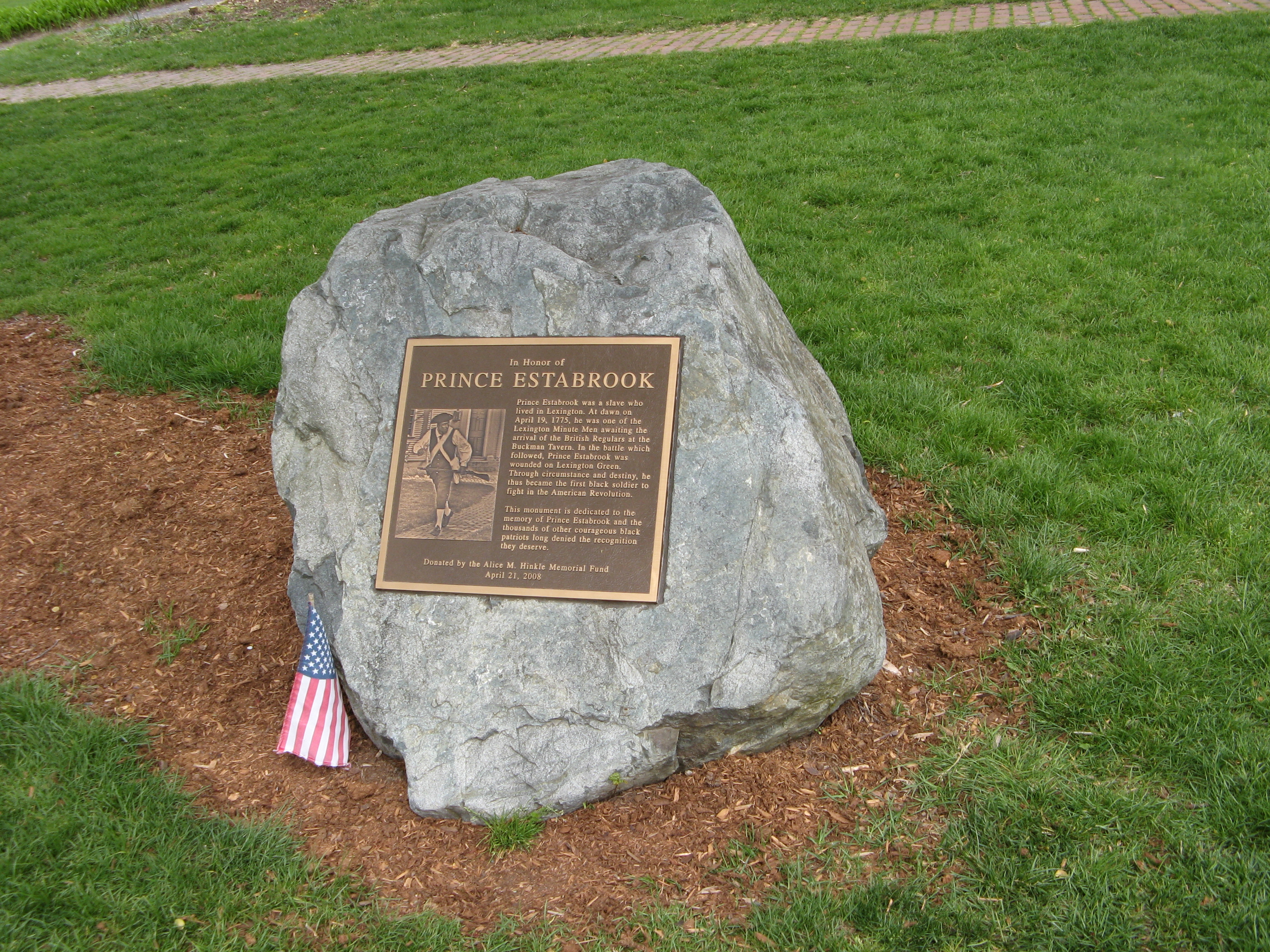
A Lexington, Massachusetts memorial to Prince Estabrook, who was wounded in the Battle of Lexington and Concord and was the first Black military casualty of the American Revolutionary War

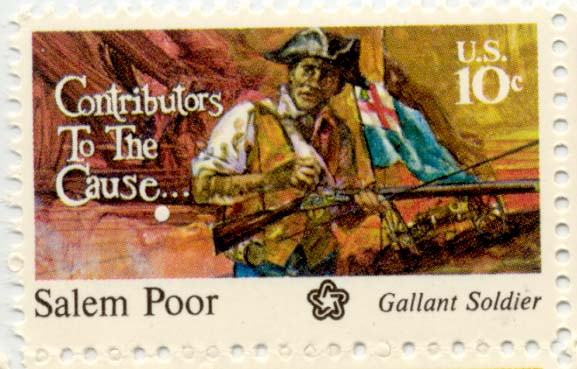
A postage stamp, created at the time of the bicentennial, honors Salem Poor, who was an enslaved African American man who purchased his freedom, became a soldier, and rose to fame as a war hero during the Battle of Bunker Hill.

During the revolution, the contradiction between the Patriots' professed ideals of liberty and the institution of slavery generated increased scrutiny of the latter. As early as 1764, the Boston Patriot leader James Otis, Jr. declared that all men, "white or black", were "by the law of nature" born free. Anti-slavery calls became more common in the early 1770s. In 1773, Benjamin Rush, the future signer of the Declaration of Independence, called on "advocates for American liberty" to oppose slavery. Slavery became an issue that had to be addressed. As historian Christopher L. Brown put it, slavery "had never been on the agenda in a serious way before," but the Revolution "forced it to be a public question from there forward."

In the late 1760s and early 1770s, several colonies, including Massachusetts and Virginia, attempted to restrict the slave trade, but were prevented from doing so by royally appointed governors. In 1774, as part of a broader non-importation movement aimed at Britain, the Continental Congress called on all the colonies to ban the importation of enslaved people, and the colonies passed acts doing so.

In the first two decades after the American Revolution, state legislatures and individuals took actions to free the enslaved, in part based on Revolutionary ideals. Northern states passed new constitutions that contained language about equal rights or specifically abolished slavery; some states, such as New York and New Jersey, where slavery was more widespread, passed laws by the end of the 18th century to abolish slavery by a gradual method. By 1804, all the northern states had passed laws outlawing slavery, either immediately or over time.

No southern state abolished slavery. However, enslavers could grant freedom to individuals they enslaved. Numerous slaveholders who freed their enslaved cited Revolutionary ideals in their documents; others freed their enslaved as a reward for service. Records also suggest that some slaveholders were freeing their own mixed-race children, born to enslaved mothers. The number of free Blacks as a proportion of the Black population in the upper South increased from less than 1 percent to nearly 10 percent between 1790 and 1810 as a result of these actions. (Note: Attributed to multiple sources:) Nevertheless, slavery continued in the South, where it was protected as a "peculiar institution", setting the stage for future sectional conflict between North and South over the issue.

Thousands of free Blacks in the northern states fought in the state militias and Continental Army. In the south, both sides offered freedom to slaves who would perform military service. Roughly 20,000 enslaved persons fought in the American Revolution.

=== Status of American women ===
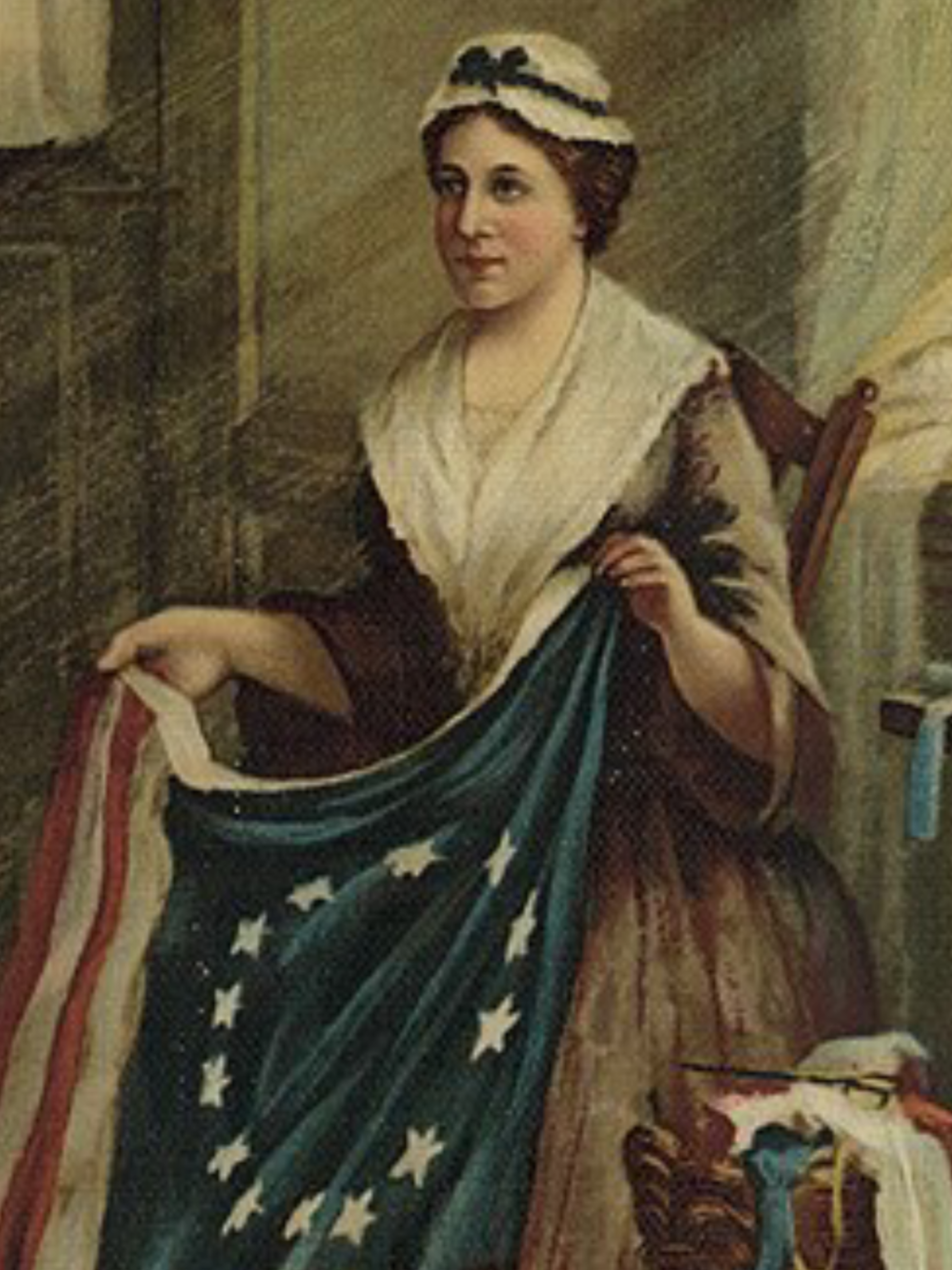
Betsy Ross, an American upholsterer, is allegedly known for designing the first U.S. flag, specifically known as the Betsy Ross flag.

While American women were entering a period in which they found themselves gaining more identity within society, they were still very much considered to be subordinate to men, as their role remained being a good wife and mother. Having a woman who was dressed well for her role as a good wife and mother, as well as fitting the social role, was a symbol of not only status, but a family devoted to the republic. As they continued to nurture social and political partnerships, their role in enabling the success of the revolution emphasized their changing role in society – leading to the post-revolutionary reconstruction of gender ideology.

In addition, the democratic ideals of the Revolution inspired changes in the roles of women. Patriot women married to Loyalists who left the state could get a divorce and obtain control of the ex-husband's property. Abigail Adams expressed to her husband, the president, the desire of women to have a place in the new republic:

I desire you would remember the Ladies, and be more generous and favourable to them than your ancestors. Do not put such unlimited power into the hands of the Husbands.

As discussions rose regarding the rights of man post-Revolutionary war, women began pushing for the rights of women as well. Mary Wollstonecraft pioneered the discussion regarding women's rights, and pushed those like Abigail Adams to begin expressing the desire to want a larger place in society. Wollstonecraft was an English writer, philosopher, and advocate for women's rights who published the Vindication of the Rights of Woman (1792) – challenging the idea that rights should only be granted to men. She was one of the first major advocates and foundational figures for women's rights and gender equality in a time when women were considered inferior to men. Wollstonecraft focused on equal education and social opportunities for women – believing that if women were educated the same as men, they would gain autonomy over their own lives and better contribute to society. Her ideas contributed to the conversation in allowing women to be bearers of rights alongside men. Inspired by the radical feminism in her work, women in the early republic would change their views on marriage, education, participation in public life, and autonomy. This laid the groundwork for the later women's suffrage movement, education opportunities, property rights, and more.

However, a gender hierarchy would continue to bind women's rights after the Revolution. Women in the early republic could not vote, hold political office, or earn fair wages. They also lacked opportunities for higher education and certain professions, as well as the right to own property independently of their husbands. In addition, they held little legal powers in subjects such as divorce, property rights, and child custody. A central legal concept that reinforced these restrictions was coverture, a central legal doctrine that limited women's lives in all aspects – making a woman's legal identity a part of their husband's. The early national period of America would continue to struggle with the concept of rights and equality.

=== American Loyalist expatriation ===
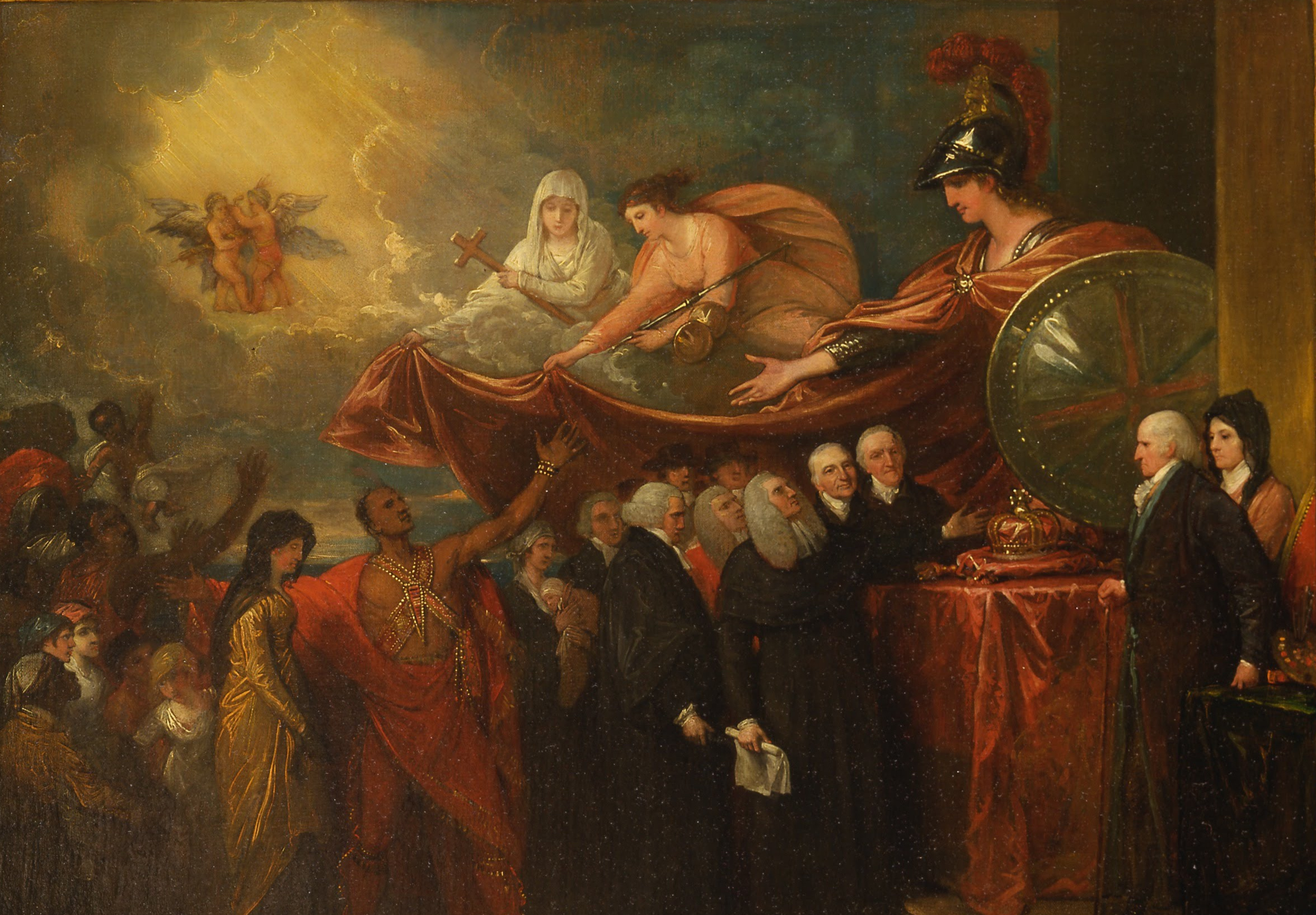
Reception of the American Loyalists by Great Britain in the Year 1783, a painting by early American artist Benjamin West

Tens of thousands of American Loyalists left the United States following the war; Philip Ranlet estimates 20,000, while Maya Jasanoff estimates as many as 70,000. Some migrated to Britain, but the great majority received land and subsidies for resettlement in British colonies in North America, especially Quebec (concentrating in the Eastern Townships), Prince Edward Island, and Nova Scotia. Britain created the colonies of Upper Canada (Ontario) and New Brunswick expressly for their benefit, and the Crown awarded land to Loyalists as compensation for losses in the United States. Nevertheless, approximately eighty-five percent of the Loyalists stayed in the United States as American citizens, and some of the dispersed Loyalists later returned to the U.S. Patrick Henry spoke of the issue of allowing Loyalists to return as such: "Shall we, who have laid the proud British lion at our feet, be frightened of its whelps?" His actions helped secure return of the Loyalists to American soil.

=== Commemorations ===
The American Revolution has a central place in the American memory as the story of the nation's founding. It is covered in the schools, memorialized by two national holidays, Washington's Birthday in February and Independence Day in July, and commemorated in innumerable monuments. George Washington's estate at Mount Vernon was one of the first national pilgrimages for tourists and attracted 10,000 visitors a year by the 1850s.

The Revolution became a matter of contention in the 1850s in the debates leading to the American Civil War (1861–1865), as spokesmen of both the Northern United States and the Southern United States claimed that their region was the true custodian of the legacy of 1776. The United States Bicentennial in 1976 came a year after the American withdrawal from the Vietnam War, and speakers stressed the themes of renewal and rebirth based on a restoration of traditional values.

Today, more than 100 battlefields and historic sites of the American Revolution are protected and maintained by the government. The National Park Service alone manages and maintains more than 50 battlefield parks and many other sites such as Independence Hall that are related to the Revolution. The private American Battlefield Trust uses government grants and other funds to preserve almost 700 acres of battlefield land in six states, and the ambitious private recreation/restoration/preservation/interpretation of over 300 acres of pre-1790 Colonial Williamsburg was created in the first half of the 20th century for public visitation.

== See also ==
- Influence of the American Revolution on the French Revolution
- French Revolution
- French Revolutionary Wars
- International relations (1648–1814)
- List of films about the American Revolution
- List of George Washington articles
- List of plays and musicals about the American Revolution
- List of television series and miniseries about the American Revolution
- Museum of the American Revolution
- Timeline of the American Revolution
- Founding Fathers of the United States

== Sources ==
- Bailyn, Bernard (1992). The Ideological Origins of the American Revolution. Cambridge, Massachusetts: Belknap Press of Harvard University Press. ISBN 978-0-674-44301-3.
- Barnes, Viola Florence (1960) [1923]. The Dominion of New England: A Study in British Colonial Policy. New York: Frederick Ungar. OCLC 395292.
- Calloway, Colin G. (1995). The American Revolution in Indian country: pcrisis and diversity in Native American communities. Cambridge; New York: Cambridge University Press. ISBN 978-0-521-47149-7.
- Commager, Henry Steele; Richard B. Morris (1967) [1958]. The Spirit of Seventy-Six. The story of the American Revolution as told by its participants. Castle Books; HarperCollins Publishers. ISBN 0-7858-1463-9. LCCN 67011325.
- Evans, James Truslow (1922). The Founding of New England. Boston: The Atlantic Monthly Press. OCLC 1068441.
- Ferguson, Robert A. (2000). "The Commonalities of Common Sense". The William and Mary Quarterly. 57 (3): 465–504. doi:10.2307/2674263. ISSN 0043-5597. JSTOR 2674263.
- Greene, Jack P.; Pole, J.R., eds. (1991). The Blackwell Encyclopedia of the American Revolution. Hoboken, NJ: John Wiley and Sons, Limited. ISBN 978-1-55786-244-0.
- Greene, Jack P.; Pole, J.R., eds. (2003). A Companion to the American Revolution. Hoboken, NJ: John Wiley and Sons, Limited. ISBN 978-1-4051-1674-9.
- Greene, Jack P. (2000). "The American Revolution". The American Historical Review. 105 (1): 93–102. doi:10.2307/2652437. ISSN 1937-5239. JSTOR 2652437.
- Kukla, Jon (2017). Patrick Henry: Champion of Liberty. New York: Simon & Schuster. ISBN 978-1-4391-9081-4.
- Lepore, Jill (1999). The Name of War: King Philip's War and the Origins of American Identity. Vintage Books. ISBN 978-0-375-70262-4.
- Lovejoy, David (1987). The Glorious Revolution in America. Middletown, CT: Wesleyan University Press. ISBN 978-0-8195-6177-0. OCLC 14212813.
- Lowell, Edward J. (1884). The Hessians and the other German Auxiliaries of Great Britain in the Revolutionary War. Harper & Brothers, Franklin Square, New York. LCCN 02004604.
- Lustig, Mary Lou (2002). The Imperial Executive in America: Sir Edmund Andros, 1637–1714. Madison, WI: Fairleigh Dickinson University Press. ISBN 978-0-8386-3936-8. OCLC 470360764.
- Maier, Pauline (1997). American Scripture: Making the Declaration of Independence. New York: Alfred A. Knopf. ISBN 978-0-679-45492-2.
- Maier, Pauline (1991). From Resistance to Revolution: Colonial Radicals and the Development of American Opposition to Britain, 1765–1776. New York: W.W. Norton and Company, Inc. ISBN 978-0-393-30825-9.
- Middlekauff, Robert (2005). The Glorious Cause: The American Revolution, 1763–1789. Oxford History of the United States. Vol. 3 (revised and expanded ed.). Oxford University Press. ISBN 978 0-19-516247-9.
- Miller, John C. (1959). Origins of the American Revolution (revised ed.). Stanford, California: Stanford University Press. ISBN 9780804705943. OL 17049686M.
- Nettels, Curtis P. (1938). The Roots of American Civilization: A History of American Colonial Life.
- Palfrey, John (1864). History of New England During the Stuart Dynasty. Boston: Little, Brown. OCLC 1658888.
- Pestana, Carla Gardina (2004). The English Atlantic in an Age of Revolution: 1640–1661. Harvard University Press.
- Raphael, Ray (2002). The First American Revolution – Before Lexington and Concord. New York: The New Press. ISBN 1-56584-730-X.
- Rosengarten, Joseph George (2006) [1886]. The German Soldier in the Wars of the United States. J.B. Lippencott Company, Philadelphia. ISBN 1-4286-5432-1.
- Rosengarten, Joseph George (1906). Frederick the Great and the United States. Harvard University.
- Taylor, Alan (2016). American Revolutions: A Continental History, 1750–1804. W. W. Norton & Company. ISBN 978-0-393-25387-0.
- Thomas, Robert P. (1964). "A Quantitative Approach to the Study of the Effects of British Imperial Policy of Colonial Welfare: Some Preliminary Findings". Journal of Economic History. 25 (4): 615–638. doi:10.1017/S0022050700058460. JSTOR 2116133. S2CID 153513278.
- Trevelyan, George (1912). George the Third and Charles Fox: The Concluding Part of the American Revolution. New York: Longmans, Green.
- Walton, Gary M. (1971). "The New Economic History and the Burdens of the Navigation Acts". Economic History Review. 24 (4): 533–542. doi:10.1111/j.1468-0289.1971.tb00192.x.
- Webb, Stephen Saunders (1998). Lord Churchill's Coup: The Anglo-American Empire and the Glorious Revolution Reconsidered. Syracuse, NY: Syracuse University Press. ISBN 978-0-8156-0558-4. OCLC 39756272.
- Weimer, Adrian Chastain (2023). A Constitutional Culture: New England and the Struggle Against Arbitrary Rule in the Restoration Empire. Philadelphia, PA: University of Pennsylvania Press. ISBN 978-1-5128-2397-4.
- Whaples, Robert (March 1995). "Where Is There Consensus Among American Economic Historians? The Results of a Survey on Forty Propositions". The Journal of Economic History. 55 (1): 139–154. doi:10.1017/S0022050700040602. ISSN 0022-0507. JSTOR 2123771. S2CID 145691938.
- Wood, Gordon S. (1966). "Rhetoric and Reality in the American Revolution". The William and Mary Quarterly. 23 (1): 3–32. doi:10.2307/2936154. ISSN 0043-5597. JSTOR 2936154.
- Wood, Gordon S. (1993). The Radicalism of the American Revolution. New York: Vintage Books. ISBN 978-0-679-73688-2.
- Wood, Gordon S. (2003). The American Revolution: A History. New York: Modern Library. ISBN 978-0-8129-7041-8.
