= Letters from a Farmer in Pennsylvania =

Series of essays by founding father John Dickinson

Letters from a farmer in Pennsylvania, to the inhabitants of the British Colonies
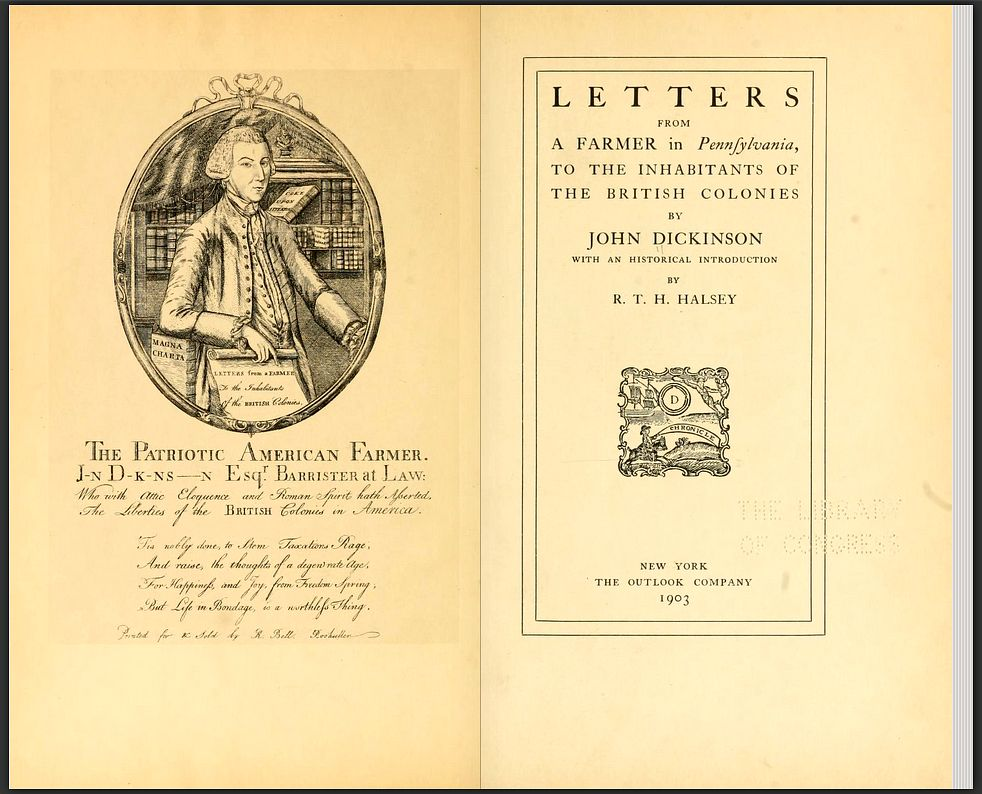
- A 1903 frontispiece and title page of the letters
- Author: John Dickinson
- Language: English
- Published: December 1767 – April 1768
- Publication place: British Empire
- Text: Letters from a farmer in Pennsylvania, to the inhabitants of the British Colonies at Wikisource

Letters from a Farmer in Pennsylvania is a series of essays written by Pennsylvania lawyer and legislator John Dickinson (1732–1808) and published under the pseudonym "A Farmer" from 1767 to 1768. The twelve letters were widely read and reprinted throughout the Thirteen Colonies, and were important in uniting the colonists against the Townshend Acts in the run-up to the American Revolution. According to many historians, the impact of the Letters on the colonies was unmatched until the publication of Thomas Paine's Common Sense in 1776. The success of the letters earned Dickinson considerable fame.

The twelve letters are written in the voice of a fictional farmer, who is described as modest but learned, an American Cincinnatus, and the text is laid out in a highly organized pattern "along the lines of ancient rhetoric". The letters laid out a clear constitutional argument, that the British Parliament had the authority to regulate colonial trade but not to raise revenue from the colonies. This view became the basis for subsequent colonial opposition to the Townshend Acts, and was influential in the development of colonial thinking about the relationship with Britain.

The letters are noted for their mild tone, and urged the colonists to seek redress within the British constitutional system. The character of "the farmer", a persona built on English pastoral writings whose style American writers before Dickinson also adopted, gained a reputation independent of Dickinson, and became a symbol of moral virtue, employed in many subsequent American political writings.

== Background ==
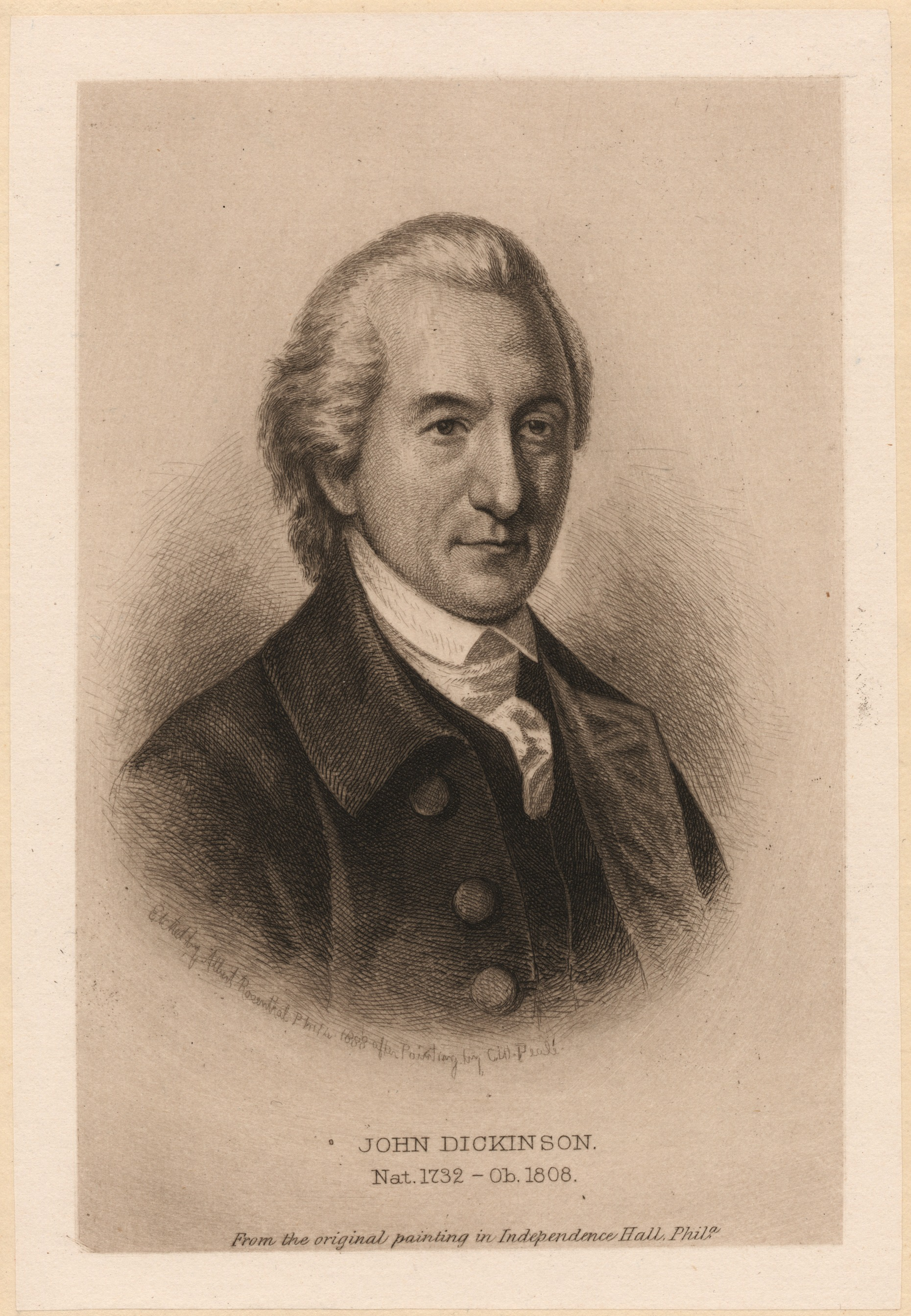
John Dickinson, author of the essays

In the 1760s, the constitutional framework binding Britain and its colonies was poorly defined. Many in Britain believed that all sovereignty in the British Empire was concentrated in the British Parliament. This view was captured by Blackstone's Commentaries on the Laws of England, which stated that "there is and must be in all [forms of government] a supreme, irresistible, absolute, uncontrolled authority, in which the jura summi imperii, or the rights of sovereignty, reside". In practice, however, the colonies and their individual legislatures had historically enjoyed significant autonomy, particularly in taxation. In the aftermath of the British victory over France in the Seven Years' War, in 1763, Britain decided to permanently station troops in North America and the West Indies. Having a specie-based currency, facing a large national debt and opposition to additional taxes in England, British officials looked to their North American colonies to enable financing the upkeep of these troops.

The passage of the Stamp Act of 1765, a tax on various printed materials in the colonies, ignited a dispute over the authority of the British Parliament to levy internal taxes on its colonies. The Stamp Act faced opposition from American colonists, who initiated a movement to boycott British goods, from British merchants affected by the boycott, and from some Whig politicians in Parliament—notably William Pitt. In 1766, under the leadership of a new ministry, Parliament repealed the Stamp Act. However, Parliament at the same time passed the Declaratory Act, which affirmed its authority to tax the colonies. In 1767, Parliament imposed import duties—remembered as the Townshend Acts—on a range of goods imported by the colonies. These duties reignited the debate over parliamentary authority.

John Dickinson, a wealthy Philadelphia lawyer and member of the Pennsylvania assembly, took part in the Stamp Act Congress in 1765, and drafted the Declaration of Rights and Grievances. In 1767, following the passage of the Townshend Acts, Dickinson set out in his pseudonymous Letters to clarify the constitutional question of Parliament's authority to tax the colonies, and to urge the colonists to take moderate action in order to oppose the Townshend Acts. The Letters were first published in the Pennsylvania Chronicle, and then reprinted in most newspapers throughout the colonies. The Letters were also reprinted in London, with a preface written by Benjamin Franklin, and in Paris and Dublin.

== The Letters ==
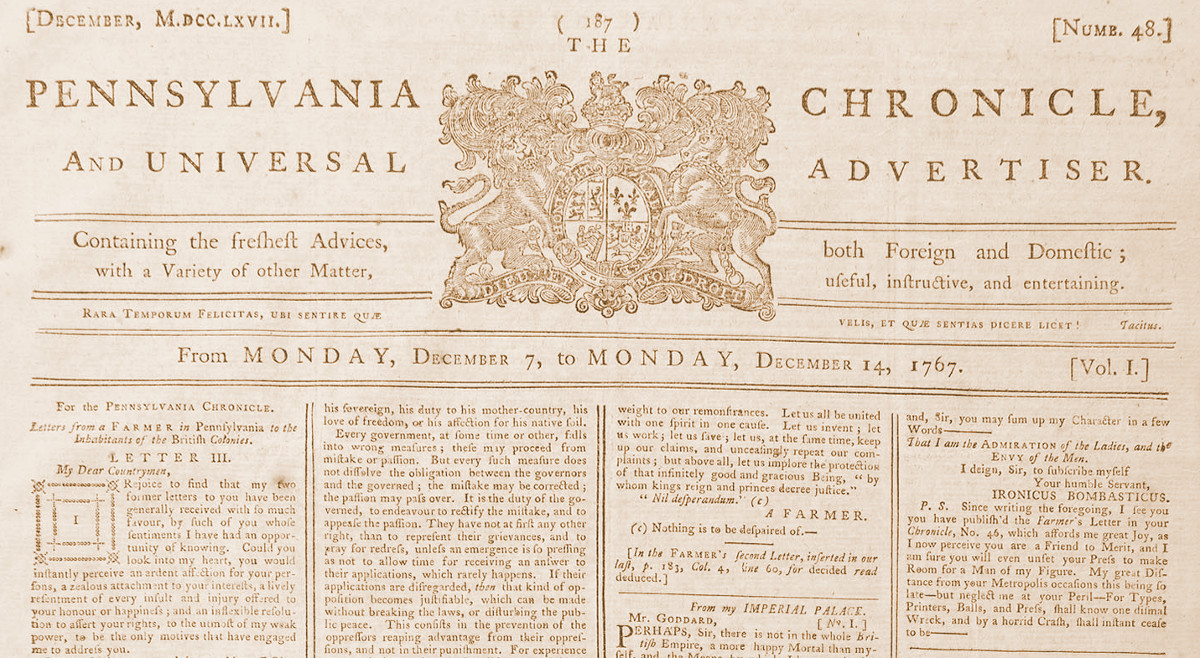
The original publication of Letter III, in the 14 December 1767 edition of the Pennsylvania Chronicle. Passages from the letter are visible, alongside a satirical reply by "Ironicus Bombasticus".

Dickinson had little to do with farming by 1767. The first letter introduces the author as "a farmer settled after a variety of fortunes, near the banks of the river Delaware, in the province of Pennsylvania." In order to explain to the reader how he has acquired "a greater share of knowledge in history, and the laws and constitution of my country, than is generally attained by men of my class," the author informs the reader that he spends most of his time in the library of his small estate. The author then turns to a discussion of the brewing crisis between the British Parliament and the colonies.

While acknowledging the power of Parliament in matters concerning the whole British Empire, Dickinson argued that the colonies retained the sovereign right to tax themselves. British officials, partially on the advice of Benjamin Franklin, believed that while American colonists would not accept "internal" taxes levied by Parliament, such as those in the Stamp Act, they would accept "external" taxes, such as import duties. However, Dickinson argued that any taxes—whether "internal" or "external"—laid upon the colonies by Parliament for the purpose of raising revenue, rather than regulating trade, were unconstitutional. Dickinson argued that the Townshend Acts, though nominally import duties and therefore "external" taxes, were nevertheless intended to raise revenue, rather than to regulate trade.

This argument implied that sovereignty in the British Empire was divided, with Parliament's power limited in certain spheres (such as taxation of the colonies), and with lesser bodies, such as colonial assemblies, exercising sovereign powers in other spheres. Dickinson further differentiated between the powers of Parliament and the Crown, with the Crown—but not Parliament—having the power to repeal colonial legislation and to wield executive authority in the colonies. These views were a significant departure from prevailing British views on sovereignty as a central, indivisible power, and they implied that the British Empire did not function as a unitary nation. They were consistent with several English constitutions, especially the 1689 Bill of Rights. After the publication of Dickinson's Letters, American colonists' views on the constitutional order in the British Empire rapidly changed, and were marked by an increasing rejection of Parliamentary power over the colonies.

Though the tax burden imposed by the Townshend Acts on the colonies was small, Dickinson argued that the duties were meant to establish the principle that Parliament could tax the colonies. Dickinson argued that in the aftermath of the Stamp Act crisis, Parliament was again testing the colonists' disposition. Dickinson warned that once Parliament's right to levy taxes on the colonies was established and accepted by the colonists, much larger impositions would follow:

Nothing is wanted at home but a PRECEDENT, the force of which shall be established by the tacit submission of the colonies [...] If the parliament succeeds in this attempt, other statutes will impose other duties [...] and thus the Parliament will levy upon us such sums of money as they choose to take, without any other LIMITATION than their PLEASURE.

— Letter X

More broadly, Dickinson argued that the expense required to comply with any act of Parliament was effectively a tax. Dickinson thus considered the Quartering Act of 1765, which required the colonies to host and supply British troops, to be a tax, to the extent that it placed a financial burden on the colonies. Although he disagreed with the New York assembly's decision not to comply with the act, Dickinson viewed non-compliance as a legitimate right of the assembly, and decried Parliament's punitive order that the assembly dissolve.

Though he disputed Parliament's right to raise revenue from the colonies, Dickinson acknowledged Parliament's authority over trade in the Empire, and saw the colonies' interests as being aligned with those of Great Britain:

[T]here is no privilege the colonies claim, which they ought, in duty and prudence, more earnestly to maintain and defend, than the authority of the British parliament to regulate the trade of all her dominions. Without this authority, the benefits she enjoys from our commerce, must be lost to her: The blessings we enjoy from our dependance on her, must be lost to us; her strength must decay; her glory vanish; and she cannot suffer, without our partaking in her misfortune.

— Letter VI

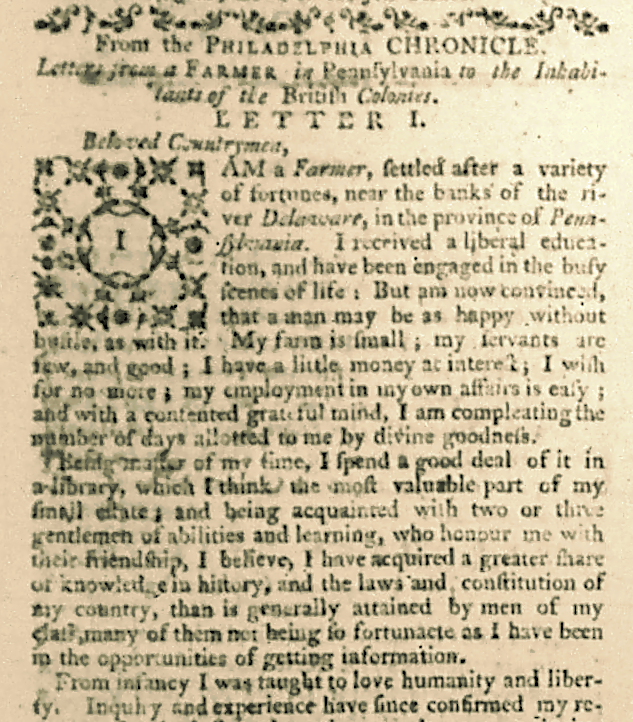
Letter I, as reprinted in the Boston Gazette on 21 December 1767.

Beyond the questions of taxation and regulation of trade, Dickinson did not elaborate a detailed theory of the broader constitutional relationship between Britain and the colonies. However, the letters warned against separation from Great Britain, and predicted tragedy for the colonies, should they become independent:

Torn from the body, to which we are united by religion, liberty, laws, affections, relations, language, and commerce, we must bleed at every vein.

— Letter III

In his letters, Dickinson foresaw the possibility of future conflict between the colonies and Great Britain, but cautioned against the use of violence, except as a last resort:

If at length it becomes undoubted that an inveterate resolution is formed to annihilate the liberties of the governed, the English history affords frequent examples of resistance by force. What particular circumstances will in any future case justify such resistance can never be ascertained till they happen. Perhaps it may be allowable to say generally, that it never can be justifiable until the people are fully convinced that any further submission will be destructive to their happiness.

— Letter III

Instead, Dickinson urged the colonists to seek redress within the British constitutional system. In order to secure the repeal of the Townshend duties, Dickinson recommended further petitions, and proposed putting pressure on Britain by reducing imports, both through frugality and the purchase of local manufactures.

The political philosophy underlying the Letters is often placed in the Whig tradition. The letters emphasize several important themes of Whig politics, including the threat that executive power poses to liberty, wariness of standing armies, the inevitability of increasing overreach should a precedent be set, and a belief in the existence of a conspiracy against liberty.

Dickinson made use of the common Whig metaphor of "slavery," which to mid-18th century Americans symbolized a condition of subjection to "the arbitrary will and pleasure of another." The Letters cited speeches given in Parliament by Whig politicians William Pitt and Charles Pratt in opposition to the Stamp Act and the Declaratory Act, respectively, describing taxation without representation as slavery. Building on Pitt and Pratt, Letter VII concluded, "We are taxed without our own consent given by ourselves, or our representatives. We are therefore—I speak it with grief—I speak it with indignation—we are slaves." Such comparisons led the English Tory writer Samuel Johnson to ask in his 1775 pamphlet, Taxation no Tyranny, "How is it that we hear the loudest yelps for liberty among the drivers of negroes?" The contradiction between the use of the slavery metaphor in Whig rhetoric and the existence of chattel slavery in America eventually contributed to the latter coming under increasing challenge during and after the revolution.

=== Literary style ===
In contrast to much of the rhetoric of the time, the letters were written in a mild tone. Dickinson urged his fellow colonists, "Let us behave like dutiful children who have received unmerited blows from a beloved parent." In the judgment of historian Robert Middlekauff, Dickinson "informed men's minds as to the constitutional issues but left their passions unmoved."

The style of Dickinson's Letters is often contrasted with that of Thomas Paine's Common Sense. In the view of historian Pierre Marambaud, the contrast between "Dickinson's restrained argumentation with Paine's impassioned polemics" reflects the deepening of the conflict between Britain and the colonies—as well as the divergence of political views within the colonies—in the years separating the writing of the two works. A. Owen Aldridge compares Dickinson's style to that of the English essayist Joseph Addison, and Paine's style to that of Jonathan Swift. Aldridge also notes the more pragmatic and less philosophical emphasis of Dickinson's Letters, which are less concerned with basic principles of government and society than Paine's Common Sense, and instead focus more on immediate political concerns. Aldridge compares the character of "the farmer," who contemplates politics, law and history in his countryside library, to the political philosopher Montesquieu.

The classical themes in the Letters—common in political writings of the time—are often commented on. Dickinson quotes liberally from classical writers, such as Plutarch, Tacitus and Sallust, and draws frequent parallels between the situation facing the colonies and classical history. The second letter, for example, compares Carthage's use of import duties on grains in order to extract revenues from Sardinia to Britain's use of duties to raise revenues in its colonies. Each of the twelve letters ends with a Latin epigram intended to capture the central message to the reader, much as in Addison's essays in The Spectator. The final letter concludes with an excerpt from Memmius' speech in Sallust's Jugurthine War:

Certe ego libertatem, quae mihi a parente meo tradita est, experiar; verum id frustra an ob rem faciam, in vestra manusitum est, quirites.

"For my part, I am resolved strenuously to contend for the liberty delivered down to me from my ancestors; but whether I shall do this effectually or not, depends on you, my countrymen."

— Letter XII

The farmer—described as a man of genteel poverty, indifferent to riches—would have evoked classical allusions familiar to many English and colonial readers of the time: Cincinnatus, the husbandman of Virgil's Georgics and the Horatian maxim, aurea mediocratis (the golden mean).

== Reception ==
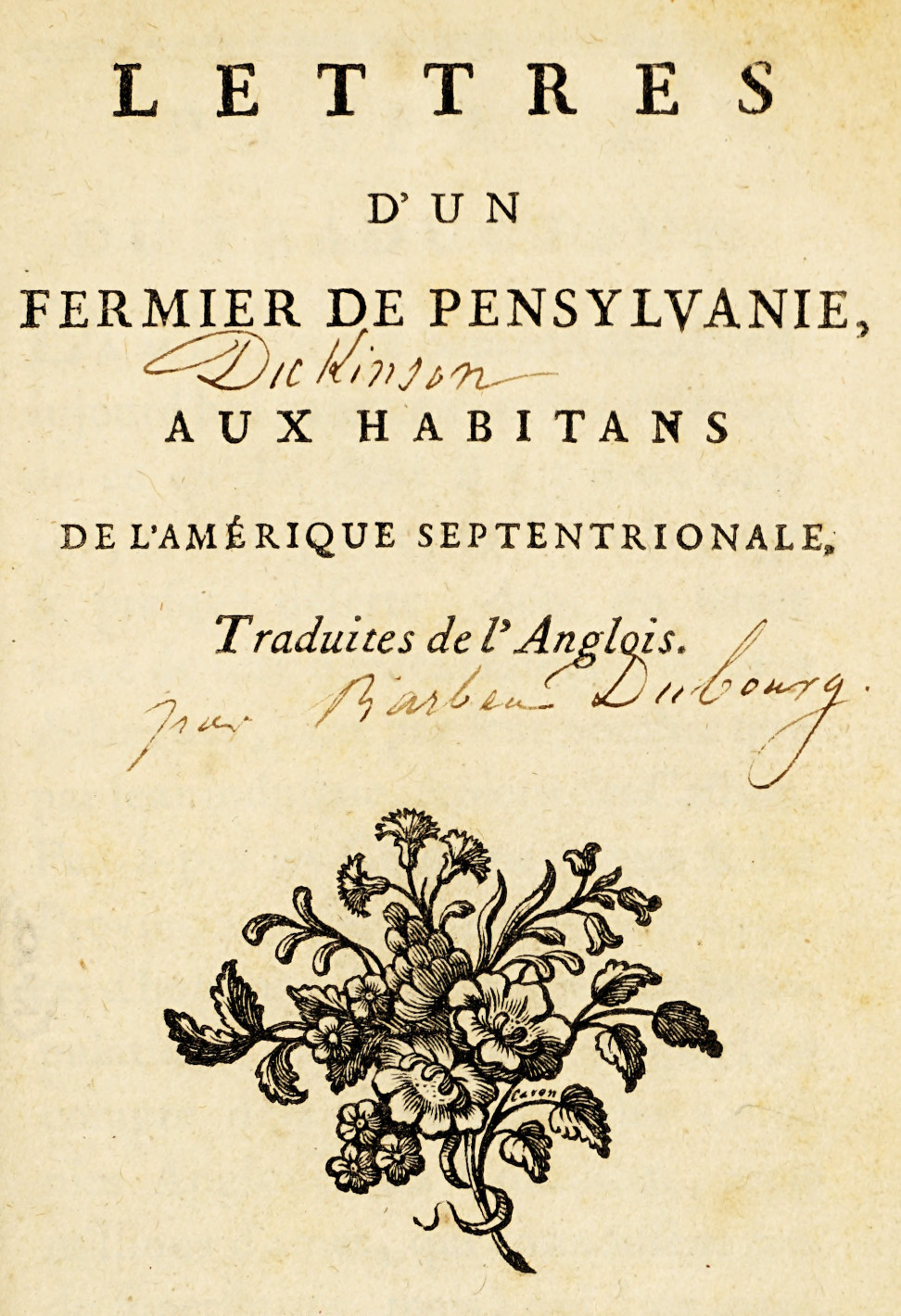
As French was the language of politics in Continental Europe, the French translation published in 1769 (pictured above) allowed the Letters to reach a broad European audience.

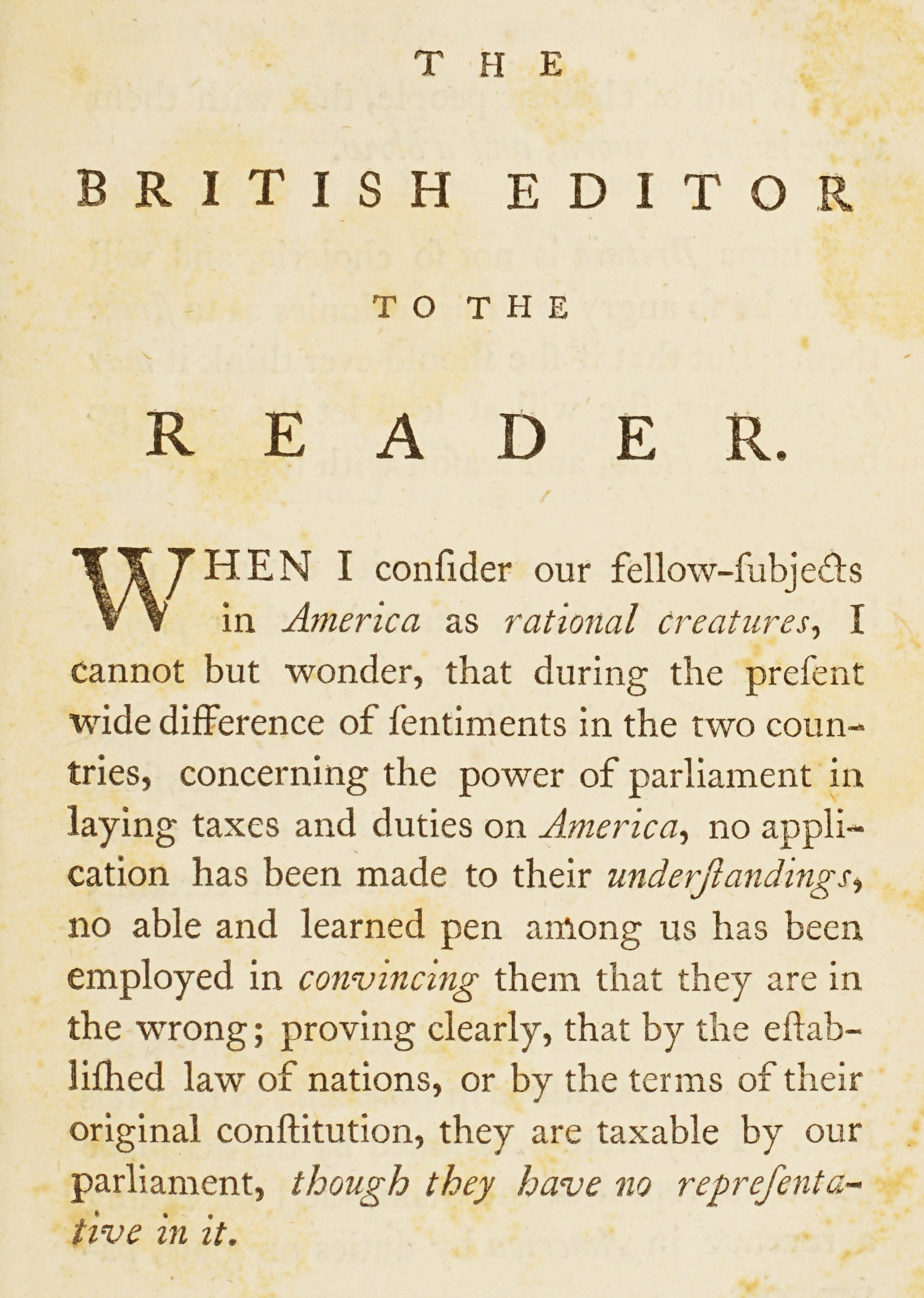
The opening of Benjamin Franklin's preface to the London edition of the Letters, published in June 1768.

Letters from a Farmer in Pennsylvania had a large impact on thinking in the colonies. Between 2 December 1767 and 27 January 1768, the letters began to be published in 19 of the 23 English-language newspapers in the colonies, with the last of the letters appearing in February through April 1768. The letters were subsequently published in seven American pamphlet editions. The letters were also republished in Europe – in London, Dublin and Paris. The letters likely reached a larger audience than any previous political writings in the colonies, and were unsurpassed in circulation until the publication of Paine's Common Sense in 1776.

Prior to the publication of the letters, there had been little discussion of the Townshend Acts in most of the colonies. Dickinson's central constitutional theory was that Parliament had the right to regulate trade, but not to raise revenue from the colonies. Dickinson was not the first to raise the regulation–revenue distinction; he drew on arguments that Daniel Dulany had made during the Stamp Act Crisis in his popular pamphlet, Considerations on the Propriety of Imposing Taxes in the British Colonies. However, Dickinson expressed the theory more clearly than his predecessors, and this constitutional interpretation quickly became widespread throughout the colonies, forming the basis for many protests against the Townshend Acts. Nevertheless, Dickinson's interpretation was not universally accepted. Benjamin Franklin, then living in London, wrote of the practical difficulty of distinguishing between regulation and revenue-raising, and criticized what he called the "middle doctrine" of sovereignty. Writing to his son William, then Royal Governor of New Jersey, Franklin expressed his belief that "Parliament has a power to make all laws for us, or [...] it has a power to make no laws for us; and I think the arguments for the latter more numerous and weighty than those for the former". Thomas Jefferson later described the doctrine of partial parliamentary sovereignty over the colonies as "the half-way house of Dickinson". Franklin nevertheless arranged for the letters to be published in London on 1 June 1768, and informed the English public that Dickinson's views were generally held by Americans.

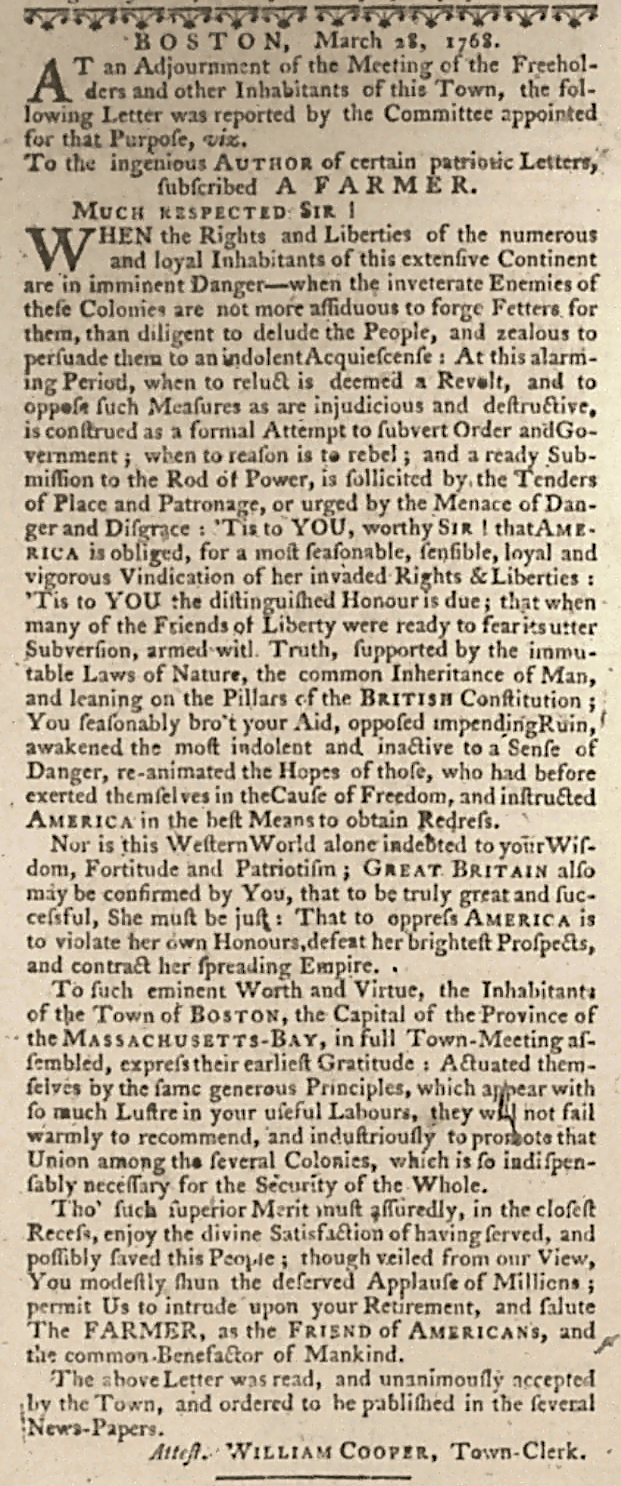
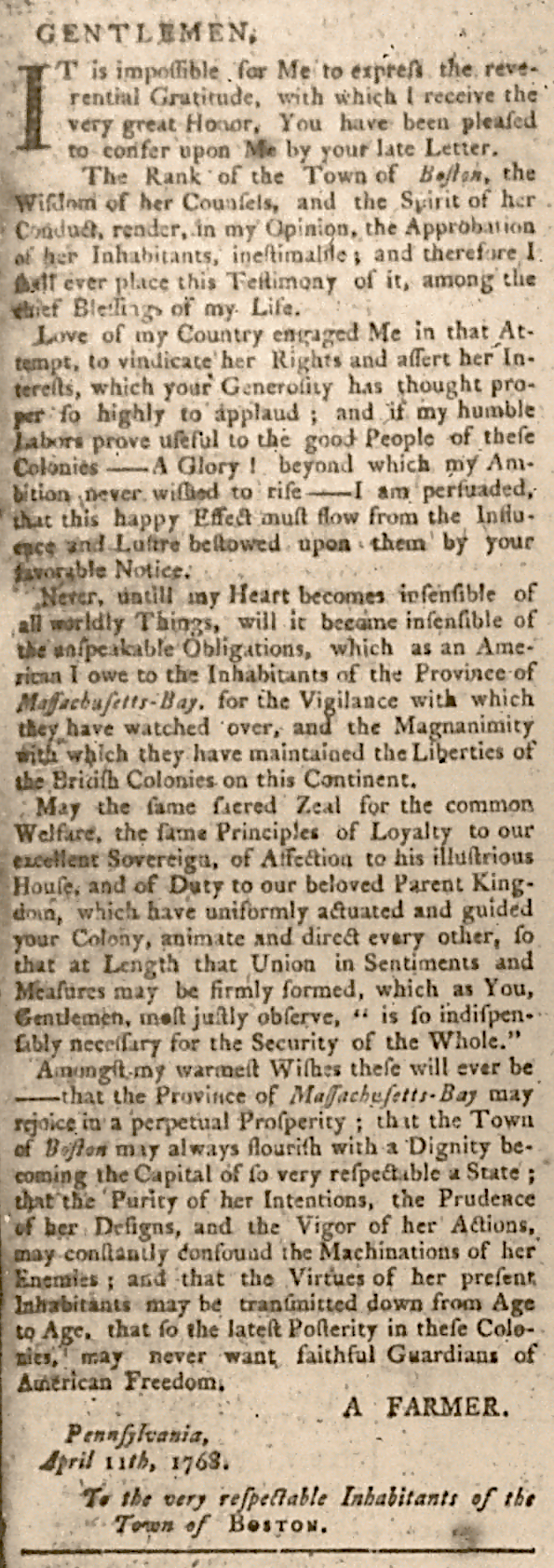
In March 1768, the town of Boston published a paean to the "farmer" in the Boston Gazette. Dickinson responded in character, signing, "A FARMER".

The wide circulation of the Letters was, in part, due to the efforts of Whig printers and political figures in the colonies. Dickinson sent the letters to James Otis Jr., who had them published in the Boston Gazette, which was affiliated with the Sons of Liberty. Dickinson's connections with political leaders throughout the colonies, including Richard Henry Lee in Virginia and Christopher Gadsden of South Carolina, helped ensure the wide publication of his letters. Popular pressure was also brought to bear on printers in Boston, Philadelphia and elsewhere to print the letters, and to refrain from printing rebuttals.

As the letters were published anonymously, Dickinson's identity as the author was not generally known until May 1768. Governor Bernard of Massachusetts speculated privately that the letters might originate from New York. Lord Hillsborough, Secretary of State for the Colonies, might have suspected Benjamin Franklin of authoring the letters, as Franklin related to his son in a letter: "My Lord H. mentioned the Farmer's letters to me, said he had read them, that they were well written, and he believed he could guess who was the author, looking in my face at the same time as if he thought it was me. He censured the doctrines as extremely wild, &c." Franklin in turn speculated that a "Mr. Delancey", possibly a reference to Daniel Dulany, might be the author. Due to the initial anonymity of the author, the character of "the farmer" attained a lasting reputation independent of Dickinson. "The farmer" was the subject of numerous official tributes throughout the colonies, such as a paean written by the town of Boston on the suggestion of Samuel Adams, and was sometimes compared to Whig heroes such as William Pitt and John Wilkes. The letters sparked limited critical reactions in the colonies, such as a series of satirical articles organized by the speaker of the Pennsylvania assembly, Joseph Galloway, which like the original Letters appeared in the Pennsylvania Chronicle. The response to the letters was substantially critical in England with only a few favorable views, such as from Granville Sharp and James Burgh. Tory papers in England rebutted Dickinson's constitutional argument by arguing that the colonists were virtually represented in Parliament, and by emphasizing the indivisibility of Parliament's sovereignty in the Empire; these rebuttals were not widely circulated in the colonies. Praise for the letters in English Whig newspapers were more widely reprinted in the colonies, producing a skewed impression in the colonies of the English reaction.

Several colonial governors acknowledged the deep impact of the letters on political opinion in their colonies. Governor James Wright of Georgia wrote to Lord Hillsborough, Secretary of State for the Colonies, that "Mr. Farmer I conceive has most plentifully sown his seeds of faction and Sedition to say no worse, and I am sorry my Lord I have so much reason to say they are scattered in a very fertile soil, and the well known author is adored in America." Dickinson's central constitutional argument about the distinction between regulation and revenue-raising was adopted by Whigs throughout the colonies, and was influential in the formulation of subsequent protests against the Townshend Acts, such as the Massachusetts Circular Letter, written by James Otis and Samuel Adams in 1768. The development of colonial views was rapid enough that by the mid-1770s, Dickinson's views on the relation between Parliament and the colonies were viewed as conservative, and were even expounded by some Tory leaders in the colonies. Dickinson's views on sovereignty were adopted by the First Continental Congress in 1774. In 1778, after serious British setbacks in the War of Independence, the British government's Carlisle Commission attempted to reach a reconciliation with the Americans on the basis of a division of sovereignty similar to the one advanced by Dickinson's Letters. However, by this point, after the signing of the Declaration of Independence and the drawing up of the Articles of Confederation, this compromise position of divided sovereignty within the British Empire was no longer viable.

The character of "the farmer" had an enduring legacy, as a symbol of "American moral virtues." Subsequent works such as the anti-Federalist pamphlet, the Federal Farmer, Crèvecœur's Letters from an American Farmer and Joseph Galloway's A Chester County Farmer were written in the voice of similar characters.
