= Daniel Dulany =

Daniel Dulany may refer to:

- Daniel Dulany the Elder (1685–1753)
- Daniel Dulany the Younger (1722–1797)

== See also ==
- Daniel Dulany Addison (1863–1936) American clergyman and writer
- Daniel Delany (1747–1814), Irish bishop
