= Impose =

Impose may refer to:

== Horses ==
- Imposing, Australian thoroughbred racehorse
- Super Impose (1984-2007), New Zealand thoroughbred racehorse

== Other ==
- Righteousness Style Imposing!! Kanetsugu and Keiji, a Japanese seinen manga series
- Considerations on the Propriety of Imposing Taxes in the British Colonies, pamphlet by Daniel Dulany the Younger
- Operation Imposing Law, a military operation in the Iraq War
- Impose, American music magazine
- "Impose", a 2025 song by Bad Omens

== See also ==
- Imposition
- Impositions
