= Declaration of Rights and Grievances =

1765 colonial American anti-tax document

Representatives of the Thirteen Colonies met in New York City in 1765 as the Stamp Act Congress to discuss a unified response to the abuses exemplified by the 1765 Stamp Act and other legislation from the British Parliament deemed contrary to the British constitution. A result was the Declaration of Rights and Grievances passed on October 19, 1765. This deliberative body and the Declaration it produced was at the other end of the resistance spectrum from the Sons of Liberty, who were at the same time using civil disobedience and public displays to agitate for British reform in the colonies.

American colonists opposed the acts in large part because they were passed without consultation with colonial legislatures, violating their rights as Englishmen. The Declaration of Rights raised fourteen points of colonial protest but was not directed solely to the Stamp Act. Among the assertions it made that were not specific protests of the Stamp Act are the following:

- Colonists owe to the crown "the same allegiance" owed by "subjects born within the realm".
- Colonists owe to Parliament "all due subordination".
- Colonists possessed all the rights of Englishmen.
- Trial by jury is a right.
- The use of Admiralty Courts was abusive.
- Without voting rights, Parliament could not represent the colonists.
- There could be no taxation without representation.
- Only the colonial assemblies had a right to tax the colonies.

== See also ==
- Sons of Liberty
- Conciliatory Resolution
- Continental Association
- Hutchinson letters affair
- Olive Branch Petition
- Petition to the King (1774)
