= Fort Severn =

Fort on the Severn River

- Annapolis, Maryland
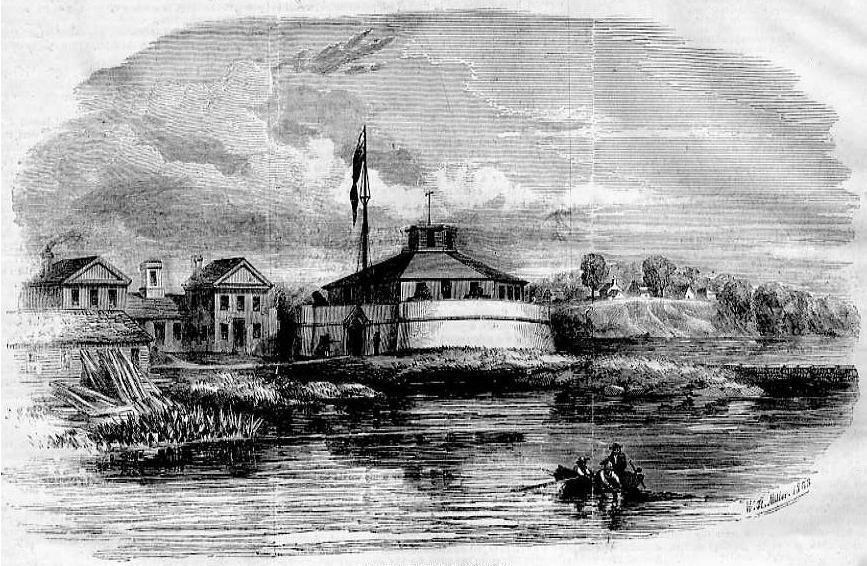
- Fort Severn in 1853

Site information
- Type: Fortification
- Owner: United States Naval Academy
- Controlled by: United States

Location
- Coordinates: 38.9818°N 76.4812°W

Site history
- Built: 1808
- In use: 1808–1845
- Demolished: 1909
- Battles/wars: None

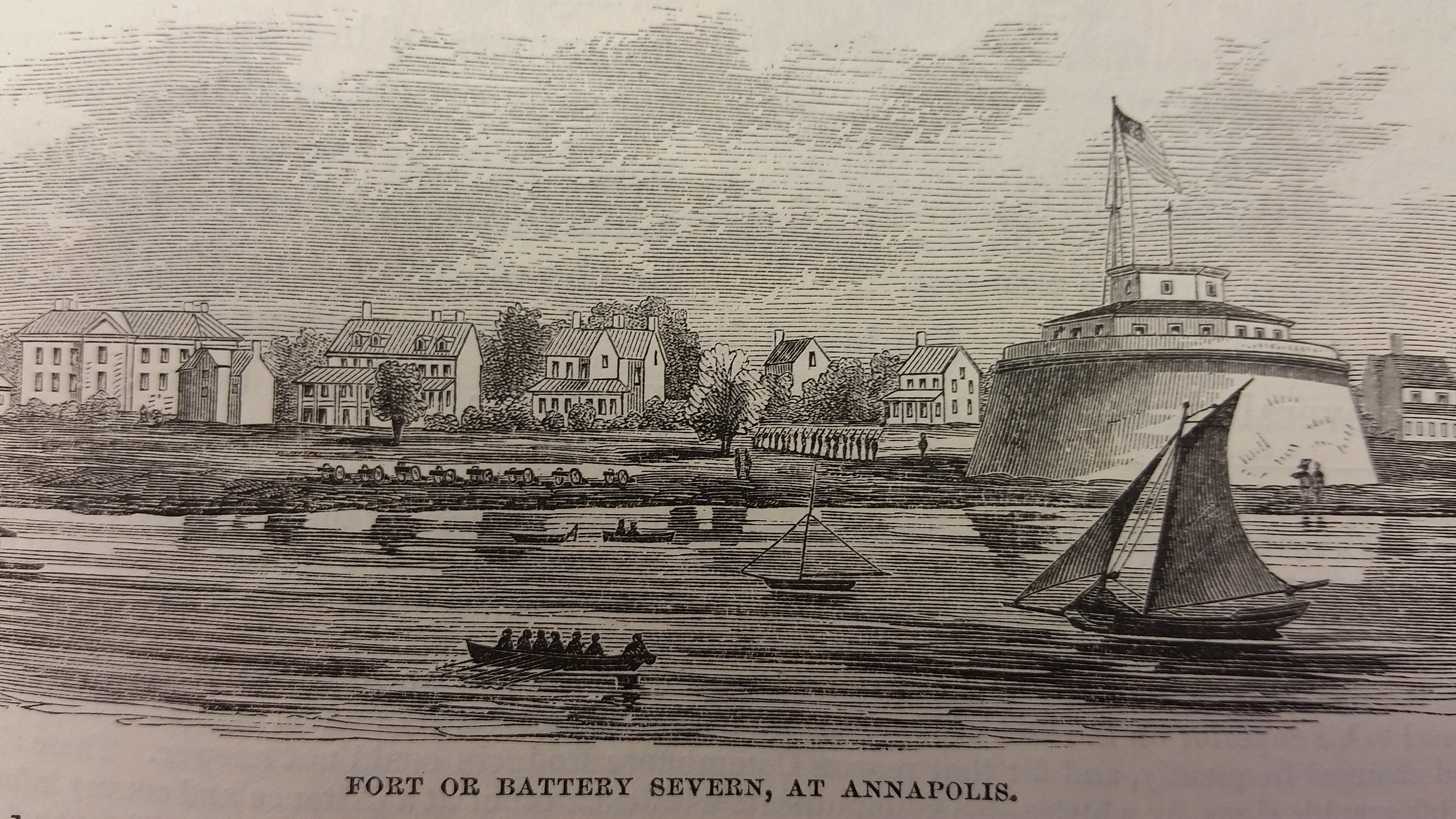
Fort Severn

Fort Severn, in present-day Annapolis, Maryland, was built in 1808 on the same site as an earlier American Revolutionary War fort of 1776. Although intended to guard Annapolis harbor from British attack during the War of 1812, it never saw action. The United States Navy acquired Fort Severn and two other military bases from the United States Army on 19 October 1845, for the purpose of housing the new onshore United States Naval Academy. The academy used the structure for classrooms until its demolition in 1909.

== History ==
=== Fort Severn: 1808–1845 ===
The family of Walter Dulany acquired land on the Severn River adjacent Annapolis, Maryland, in 1753. The Dulany parcel included Windmill Point, where Fort Severn would later be constructed, and where a rough fortification and gun battery was placed for defense of Annapolis during the Revolutionary War. The family and the city of Annapolis sold land to the War Department in 1808, and Fort Severn was constructed on the 10 acres (4.0 ha) site. At a time of worsening tensions between the United States and Great Britain and an embargo against trade, the War Department build Fort Severn as a defense for Annapolis. From Windmill Point, Fort Severn offered protection to the harbor of Annapolis, which would have been a key target of the British forces. Although constructed as a more substantial fort than the original, this second Fort Severn never saw military action. Americans suspected that the British Army might attack the area during the War of 1812, but no conflict occurred at the fort during the war.

Soldiers continued to garrison Fort Severn after the war. The post surgeon took meteorological observations during 1822. Fort Severn occupied the same 10 acres and several antiquated wooden buildings by 1845.

In 1845, Secretary of War William L. Marcy agreed to transfer Fort Severn to the jurisdiction of Secretary of the Navy George Bancroft, effective 19 October 1845. In so doing, Secretary Bancroft overcame ongoing congressional opposition to an onshore naval school.

=== Naval Academy use ===
The Navy turned Fort Severn into a classroom building for the new onshore United States Naval Academy for young naval recruits and midshipmen, which started in October 1845 with 56 midshipmen and seven professors.

The leaders developed a new curriculum requiring midshipmen to study at the academy for four years (equivalent to classical college education) and to train aboard ships each summer. That format forms the basis of the far more advanced and sophisticated curriculum at the Naval Academy today. The curriculum in the nineteenth century included mathematics and navigation, gunnery and steam, chemistry, English, natural philosophy, and French.

=== Demolition ===
Because of structural deterioration the Naval Academy had the old Fort Severn edifices demolished in 1909, while the academy expanded in personnel and grandeur. Granite buildings replaced the old wooden structures of Fort Severn. On 28 March 1977, the local chapter of Daughters of the American Revolution (DAR) placed a plaque in remembrance of the original fort at its former site.
