= Walter Dulany =

Colonial Maryland politician, loyalist (died 1773)

Lord Mayor of Annapolis
- In office 1766–1767
- Preceded by: John Ross
- Succeeded by: Upton Scott

Personal details
- Born: 1722 Maryland
- Died: September 20, 1773 Anne Arundel, Maryland
- Spouse: Mary Grafton
- Relations: Daniel Dulany the Elder (father); Daniel Dulany the Younger (brother)
- Occupation: planter, politician
- Commissary general

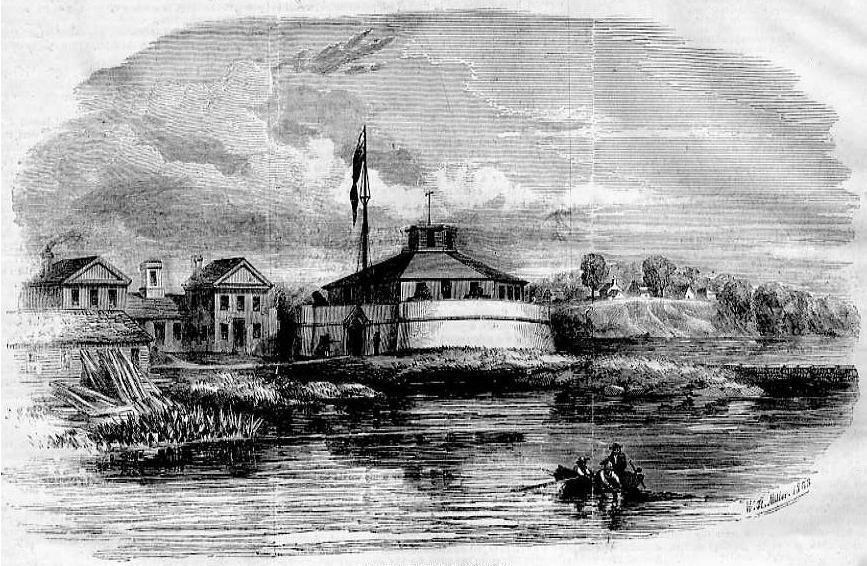
Walter Dulany's house at Windmill Point would become part of Fort Severn, and later still a part of the United States Naval Academy.

Walter Dulany (1722 – September 20, 1773) was a politician in Colonial Maryland, who was Lord Mayor of Annapolis from 1766 to 1767. His family house and land at Windmill Point later became the location for the United States Naval Academy.

== Early life ==
Dulany was the second son of Daniel Dulany the Elder and his wife Rebecca Smith.

On June 30, 1753, Walter Dulany bought a house in Annapolis from one Simon Duff, described as "sixty five feet in length and twenty one feet in breadth, to which is a good cellar, garden, and all necessary out-houses, delightfully situated, near a good landing". Dulany paid £250 for his new house, "wherein the said Simon Duff now liveth". The Dulany family would live there from 1753 to 1808.

== Politics ==
Politically, Dulany was a Loyalist, like his father and older brother Daniel Dulany the Younger. He served as Mayor of Annapolis from 1766 to 1767. He was also Judge for probate of wills, and succeeded his father as Commissary General. Indeed, it was claimed that the office of Commissary General was "almost hereditary" within the Dulany family.

== Coming of revolution ==
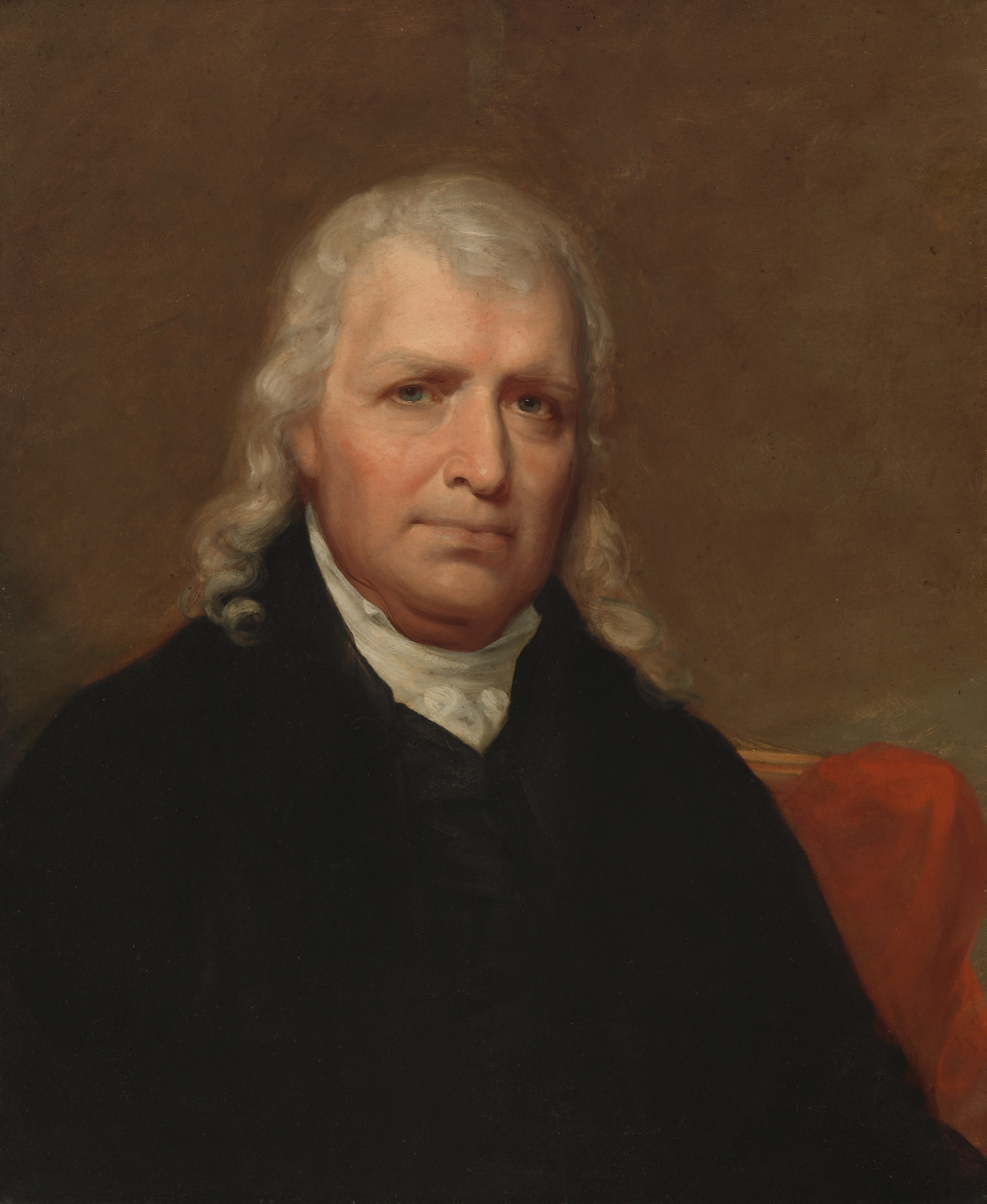
Samuel Chase, signer of the Declaration of Independence and Dulany's implacable opponent.

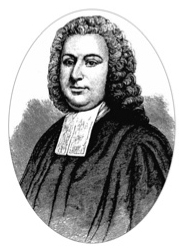
Dulany's older brother, Daniel Dulany the Younger

In 1766, the year he became Mayor, Dulany became embroiled in a war of words with Samuel Chase, a vocal opponent of the Stamp Act and later a signer of the American Declaration of Independence. In an open letter dated July 18, 1766, Chase attacked Dulany, Michael MacNamara, John Brice, George Steuart (1700–1784), and others for publishing an article in the Maryland Gazette Extraordinary of June 19, 1766, in which Chase had been accused of being: "a busy, reckless incendiary, a ringleader of mobs, a foul-mouthed and inflaming son of discord and faction, a common disturber of the public tranquility".

In his response, Chase accused Dulany and the others of "vanity ... pride and arrogance", and of being brought to power by "proprietary influence, court favour, and the wealth and influence of the tools and favourites who infest this city."

In particular, Chase accused Dulany of electoral impropriety:

You were re-elected by mere chance, but upon a petition from the citizens, complaining of an undue election, you were again discharged from the house, and another gentleman chosen in your room, I was unfortunately of that number who were of opinion your election was void, and voted accordingly. This, Sir, is the cause of your resentment against me ...

The Dulany family were loyal to the Crown during the Revolution and as a result most of their extensive estates were confiscated after the war. Walter's son, Walter Dulany the younger, appealed to the American Loyalist Claims Commission in Great Britain for restitution.

== Family ==
Dulany married Mary Grafton, daughter of Richard Grafton. They had seven children:

- Walter Jr.,
- Daniel,
- Grafton Lloyd,
- Rebecca,
- Mary,
- Margaret, and
- Catherine, who married Horatio Sharp Belt on July 23, 1783.

== Death and legacy ==
Walter Dulany died on September 20, 1773. In 1808 the younger Walter Dulany sold his family house at Windmill Point to the United States Government, which assigned the house to the commander of Fort Severn which was subsequently built there. After 1845 the house was occupied by the various superintendents of the United States Naval Academy.

== See also ==
- Colonial government in the Thirteen Colonies
- List of mayors of Annapolis, Maryland

Preceded by John Ross	Mayor of Annapolis; 1766–1767	Succeeded by Upton Scott
