= Considerations on the Propriety of Imposing Taxes in the British Colonies =

1765 pamphlet by Daniel Dulany the Younger

Considerations on the Propriety of Imposing Taxes in the British Colonies, for the Purpose of Raising a Revenue, by Act of Parliament
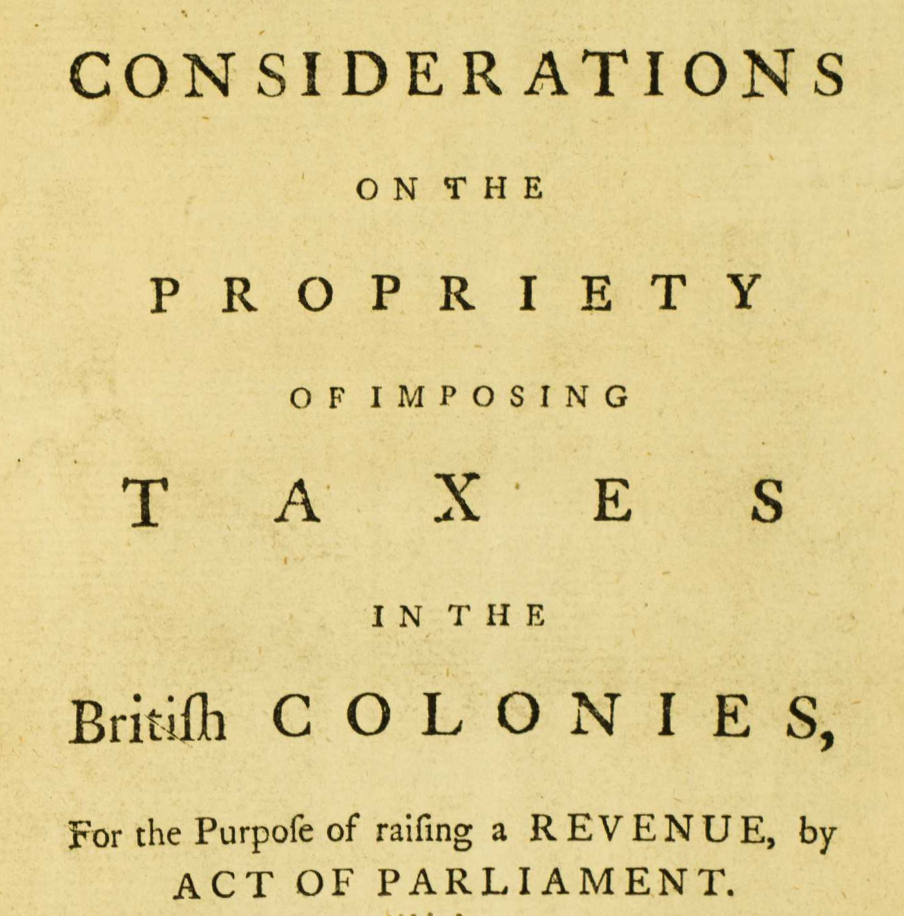
- Title page of a London reprint of the pamphlet
- Author: Daniel Dulany the Younger
- Language: English
- Published: 1765
- Publication place: British Empire

Considerations on the Propriety of Imposing Taxes in the British Colonies was a pamphlet written by Daniel Dulany the Younger in opposition to the UK Stamp Act 1765 effectively imposing taxes on the colonies. In the pamphlet, published in Annapolis in 1765, Dulany argued that the colonies could not be taxed by Parliament, as they were not represented in it. The pamphlet sold widely and was influential in the development of colonial opinion in the early stages of the American Revolution.

== Background ==
In the aftermath of the British victory over France in the Seven Years' War, in 1763, the British government decided to permanently station troops in North America and the Caribbean, looking to its American colonies to help finance their upkeep. The Stamp Act 1765 required various printed materials in the colonies to use stamped paper produced in London, and was effectively a tax on the colonies.

The direct imposition of a tax on the colonies by Parliament was controversial, due to the common English belief that the people could only be taxed by their own representatives. British Prime Minister George Grenville acknowledged this principle, but argued that the colonies were virtually represented in the British Parliament. Grenville argued that while the great majority of people in Great Britain—and entire towns such as Birmingham and Leeds—could not vote in Parliamentary elections, the members of Parliament were representatives of the entire nation, rather than of their particular constituencies.

== Dulany's pamphlet ==
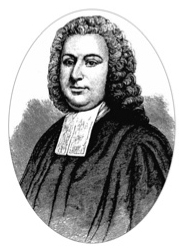
Daniel Dulany the Younger

Daniel Dulany, a Province of Maryland politician and lawyer trained in the Middle Temple in London, was unsettled by the argument that the colonists were virtually represented in Parliament. In 1765, he published his Considerations on the Propriety of Imposing Taxes in the British Colonies in Annapolis. In this pamphlet, Dulany accepted that inhabitants of England who could not vote were virtually represented by members of Parliament elected by others in England, who would presumably have similar interests. However, Dulany argued that this principle could not extend across the Atlantic Ocean, as the interests of the colonists were too far removed from those of the inhabitants of England. In England, Dulany wrote, the common interest of "the nonelectors, the electors, and the representatives, are individually the same, to say nothing of the connection among the neighbors, friends, and relations. The security of the nonelectors against oppression is that their oppression will fall upon the electors and the representatives. The one can't be injured and the other indemnified." Yet lacking this "intimate and inseparable relation" with electors in Great Britain, the colonists' interests were not protected in this manner, Dulany wrote.

Dulany further argued that members of Parliament, though formally free to act according to their conscience, nevertheless faced pressure to follow the wishes of their constituents or else lose their mandates. As the colonists had no direct representatives, they could not exert this form of electoral pressure. Dulany thus rejected the idea that the colonists were virtually represented in Parliament. Dulany was not alone in rejecting the idea that the colonists were virtually represented. Many of his contemporaries, including British parliamentarian Thomas Whately and Massachusetts politician James Otis, Jr., similarly criticized the concept and its application to the colonies.

Dulany's pamphlet also set out to define the proper limits of parliamentary power. In legalistic terms, he distinguished between legislation and taxation. In the former, Dulany viewed Parliament as supreme throughout the British Empire. However, following the principle that taxes are a free gift of the people, enacted through their representatives, Dulany held that Parliament only possessed the right to tax the people of England, Wales and Scotland. Parliament thus had the right to regulate trade in its colonies, and might even collect "incidental Revenue" in doing so, but could not pass laws "for the single purpose of revenue". This distinction between regulation and revenue-raising anticipated John Dickinson's legal argument in his influential Letters from a Farmer in Pennsylvania, published from 1767 to 1768.

Though the pamphlet at times took on an angry tone, it proposed moderate measures to pressure Parliament into rescinding the Stamp Act. Dulany encouraged his fellow colonists to reduce purchases of British manufactures and instead to turn to local products, which he believed would cause British merchants to lobby Parliament for repeal of the act.

Dulany's pamphlet achieved a circulation that few colonial pamphlets had ever reached before. In the judgment of historians Edmund and Helen Morgan, "Its articulation and justification of [his countrymen's] own instinctive view of colonial rights delighted them."

== See also ==
- No taxation without representation
- Stamp Act Congress
- Declaration of Rights and Grievances
- Virginia Resolves
- Braintree Instructions
