= 1768 Petition, Memorial, and Remonstrance =

Protest by the Virginia House of Burgesses

The Petition to His Majesty, The Memorial to the House of Lords and The Remonstrance to the House of Commons, commonly referred to collectively as the 1768 Petition, Memorial and Remonstrance (PMR), are a series of imprints that record a protest by the Virginia House of Burgesses in April 1768 that was sent to the British government by then-acting Lieutenant Governor John Blair.

The imprint had been owned by David Hartley (the Younger), a sometime Member of Parliament and a long-time friend of Benjamin Franklin. He probably received it from G.W. Fairfax, a George Washington friend who returned to England in 1773. Hartley was the sole official British signatory to the 1783 Treaty of Paris, formally ending the American Revolution. Hartley had long supported freedoms for all Englishmen, at home and in the colonies—later reflected in the Declaration of Independence.

This Virginia protest elicited no formal response from the British government. However, in mid-1768, Virginia Governor General Sir Jeffrey Amherst was unceremoniously replaced by Lord Norborne Berkeley, Baron de Botetourt, who promptly came to Virginia with a royal instruction "to reside constantly within the Colony" and to call for military aid if there was any "sudden commotion of the populace".

Virginia had notified the other colonies of its PMR, seeking support for its positions. The letter with the Massachusetts Circular Letter stimulated further protests. By December 1769, all the American colonies had formally protested the taxation called for by the Townshend Acts.

== Background ==
In 1683, the Assembly of New York passed a Charter of Liberties and Privileges asserting that "supreme legislative power should forever be and reside in the Governor, council, and people, met in general assembly" and enumerated citizens's rights, including taxation voted only by the citizenry's representatives, trial by peers, exemption from martial law, exemption from the quartering of soldiers, and religious toleration.

In a 1748 visit to New York, Massachusetts, Governor William Shirley wrote of the New York Assembly, "They seem to have left scarcely any part of His Majesty's prerogative untouched, and they have gone great lengths toward getting the Government, military as well as civil, into their hands."

Boston's Samuel Adams suggested that colonial objections "should harmonize with each other". This 11 February 1768 Massachusetts Circular Letter invited every colony to cooperate in resistance. The British ordered the Massachusetts Assembly to rescind the letter. It refused, and its royal governor dissolved it. This led Virginia to generate the PMR on 14 April 1768, and to announce it to sister colonies. Then, the 6th May New Jersey Assembly Petition to the King asserted "the Privilege of being exempt from any Taxation except as imposed ... by themselves or Representatives". Soon, every colony protested.

In 1766, the colonies tried non-importation agreements. These induced the Stamp Act repeal. In 1768, port cities and nearly every region adopted their own agreements.

On 10 May 1773, the Tea Act granted a tea monopoly to the East India Company. Philadelphians protested en masse in October. On 16 December, after Governor Thomas Hutchinson blocked an attempt to return the Dartmouth, still loaded, to England, activists boarded three tea ships and dumped 342 containers of tea into the harbor. On 17 June, Massachusetts called for "a meeting of Committees from the several Colonies on this Continent". Virginia supported the idea. In 1774, this happened—the First Continental Congress. Delegates included George Washington (Va.), Patrick Henry (Va.), John Adams (Ma.), Samuel Adams (Ma.), Joseph Galloway (Pa.), and John Dickinson (Pa.). Peyton Randolph (Va.) was chosen as its president.

== See also ==
- No taxation without representation
