= No taxation without representation =

Political movement originating in the American Revolution

"No taxation without representation" is a political slogan that originated in the American Revolution, and which expressed one of the primary grievances of the American colonists for Great Britain. In short, many colonists believed that as they were not represented in the distant British parliament, any taxes it imposed on the colonists (such as the Stamp Act and the Townshend Acts) were unconstitutional and were a denial of the colonists' rights as Englishmen since Magna Carta.

The firm belief that the government should not tax a populace unless that populace is represented in some manner in the government developed in the English Civil War, following the refusal of parliamentarian John Hampden to pay ship money tax. In the context of British taxation of its American colonies, the slogan "No taxation without representation" appeared for the first time in a headline of a February 1768 London Magazine printing of Lord Camden's "Speech on the Declaratory Bill of the Sovereignty of Great Britain over the Colonies", which was given in parliament. The British government argued for virtual representation, the idea that people were represented by members of Parliament even if they did not have any recourse to remove them if they were unsatisfied with the representation, i.e. through elections.

The term has since been used by various other groups advocating for representation or protesting against taxes, such as the women's suffrage movement, advocates of District of Columbia voting rights, students seeking to be included in governance in higher education, the Tea Party movement, and others.

== Prior to the American Revolution ==
According to Michael Hudson, the idea had an early precedent in medieval English law, which established the principle in Magna Carta where chapter 12 states that "no scutage or aid is to be levied in our kingdom, save by the common counsel of our kingdom."

Since 1660, the English Parliament had exercised control over colonial trade and imposed taxes on imports and exports. By the 1760s, the Americans were being deprived of a historic right. The English Bill of Rights 1689 had forbidden the imposition of taxes without the consent of Parliament. Since the colonists had no representation in Parliament, the taxes violated the guaranteed Rights of Englishmen. Parliament initially contended that the colonists had virtual representation, but the idea "found little support on either side of the Atlantic". The person who first suggested the idea of Parliamentary representation for the colonies appears to have been John Oldmixon, an English annalist of the era of Queen Anne or George I. It was afterwards put forward with approbation by Adam Smith, and advocated for a time, but afterwards rejected and strongly opposed, by Benjamin Franklin."

The 1768 Petition, Memorial, and Remonstrance, which was written by the Virginia House of Burgesses was likewise sent to Parliament, only to be ignored.

== American Revolution ==
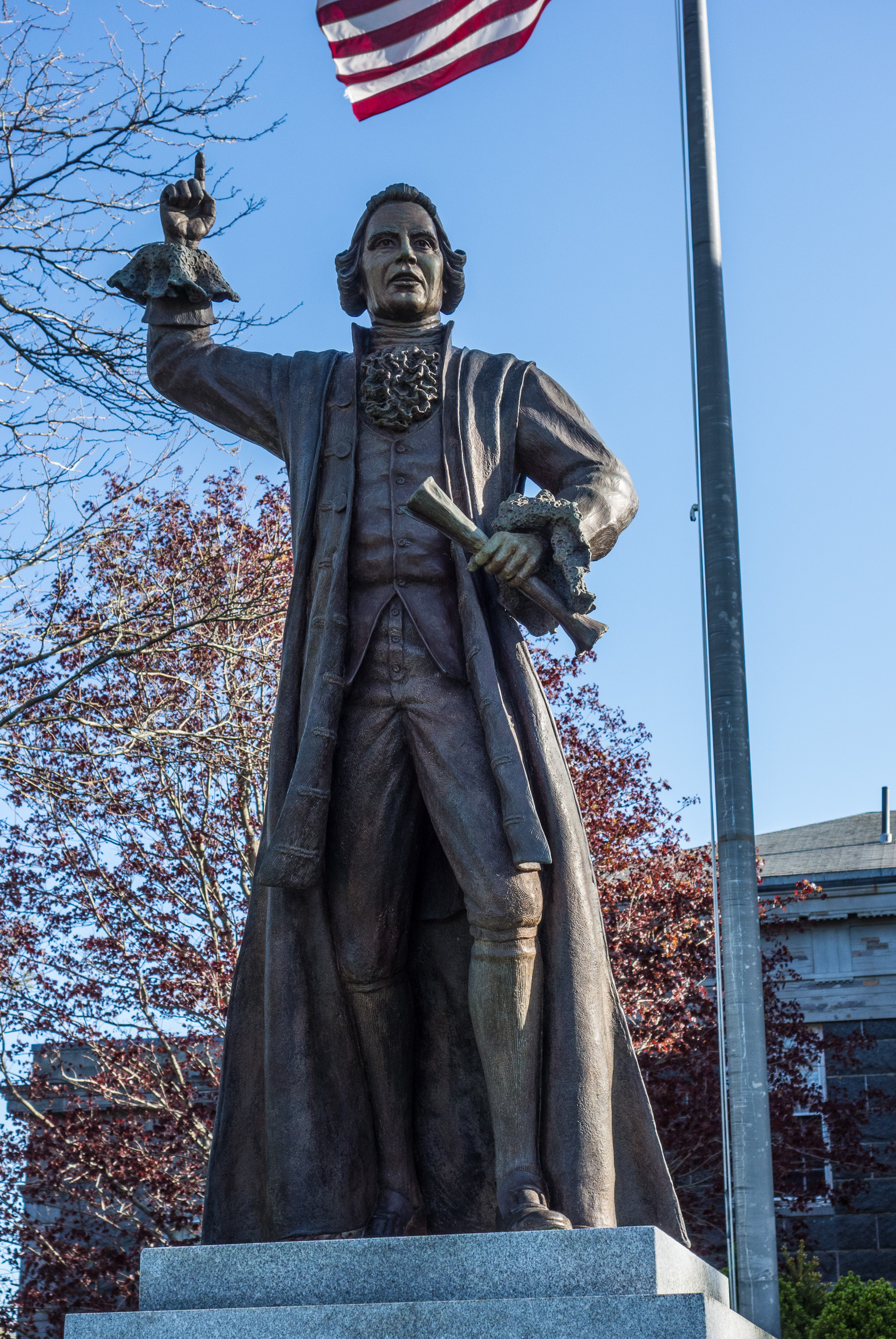
Bronze sculpture of James Otis, Jr stands in front of the Barnstable County Courthouse.

The phrase had been used for more than a generation in Ireland. By 1765, the term was in use in Boston, and local politician James Otis was most famously associated with the phrase, "taxation without representation is tyranny." In the course of the Revolutionary era (1750–1783), many arguments were pursued that sought to resolve the dispute surrounding Parliamentary sovereignty, taxation, self-governance and representation.

=== Representative proposals before 1776 ===
In the course of the 1760s and 1770s, William Pitt the Elder, Sir William Pulteney, and George Grenville, amongst other prominent Britons and colonial Americans, such as Joseph Galloway, James Otis Jr., Benjamin Franklin, John Adams, the London Quaker Thomas Crowley, Royal Governors such as Thomas Pownall M.P., William Franklin, Sir Francis Bernard, and the Attorney-General of Quebec, Francis Maseres, debated and circulated plans for the creation of colonial seats in London, imperial union with Great Britain, or a federally representative British Parliament with powers of taxation that was to consist of American, West Indian, Irish and British Members of Parliament. Despite the fact that these ideas were considered and discussed seriously on both sides of the Atlantic, it appears that neither the American Congress, nor the colonial Assemblies, nor the British Government in Westminster, at least prior to the Carlisle Peace Commission of 1778, officially proposed such constitutional developments. Governor Thomas Hutchinson apparently referred to a colonial representational proposal when he wrote that,

The Assembly of Massachusetts Bay was the first which ever took exception to the right of Parliament to impose Duties or Taxes on the Colonies, whilst they had no representatives in the House of Commons. This they did in a letter to their Agent in the summer of 1764 ... And in this letter they recommend to him a pamphlet, wrote by one of their members, in which there are proposals for admitting representatives from the Colonies to fit in the House of Commons ... an American representation is thrown out as an expedient which might obviate the objections to Taxes upon the Colonies, yet ... it was renounced ... by the Assembly of the Colony which first proposed it, as utterly impracticable.

Jared Ingersoll Sr., colonial agent for Connecticut, wrote to his American colleague, the Royal Governor of Connecticut Thomas Fitch, that following Isaac Barre's famous Parliamentary speech against the Stamp Act in 1764, Richard Jackson, M.P., supported Barre and other pro-American M.P.s by producing before the House copies of earlier Acts of Parliament that had admitted Durham and Chester seats upon their petitions for representation. The argument was put forward in Parliament that America should have representatives on these grounds, too. Richard Jackson supposed that Parliament had a right to tax America, but he much doubted the expediency of the Stamp Act. He said if it was necessary, as ministers claimed, to tax the colonies, the latter should be permitted to elect some part of the Parliament, "otherwise the liberties of America, I do not say will be lost, but will be in danger."

==== The Knox-Burke debates ====
William Knox from Ireland, an aide of George Grenville, pamphleteer and subsequent Under-Secretary of State for the Colonies, received an appointment in 1756 to the American provinces, and after his return to London in 1761, he recommended the creation of a colonial aristocracy and colonial representation in the British Parliament. He was shortly afterwards appointed agent for Georgia and East Florida, a post which he forfeited by writing in favor of the Stamp Act. In his Grenville-backed pamphlet of 1769, The Controversy between Great Britain and her Colonies Reviewed, Knox suggested that colonial representatives might have been offered seats in the British Parliament if they had sought such representation. Knox submitted that:

Whilst [the radical colonists] exclaim against Parliament for taxing them when they are not represented, they candidly declare they will not have representatives [in Parliament] lest they should be taxed ... The truth ... is that they are determined to get rid of the jurisdiction of Parliament ... and they therefore refuse to send members to that assembly lest they should preclude themselves of [the] plea [that Parliament's] legislative acts ... are done without their consent; which, it must be confessed, holds equally good against all laws, as against taxes ... The colony advocates ... tell us, that by refusing to accept our offer of representatives they ... mean to avoid giving Parliament a pretence for taxing them.

Edmund Burke responded to Knox, who had drawn up The Controversy between Great Britain and her Colonies Reviewed as well as The Present State of the Nation under the supervision of George Grenville, by opining in his political tract Observations on a Late State of the Nation:

NOW comes [Knox's] American representation ... Is not the reader a little astonished at the proposal of an American representation from that quarter [of Grenville's]? It is proposed merely as a project of speculative improvement; not from the necessity in the case, not to add any thing to the authority of parliament: but that we may afford a greater attention to the concerns of the Americans, and give them a better opportunity of stating their grievances, and of obtaining redress. I am glad to find the author has at length discovered that we have not given a sufficient attention to their concerns, or a proper redress to their grievances. His great friend [Grenville] would once have been exceedingly displeased with any person, who should tell him, that he did not attend sufficiently to those concerns. He thought he did so, when he regulated the colonies over and over again: he thought he did so, when he formed two general systems of revenue; one of port-duties, and the other of internal taxation. These systems supposed, or ought to suppose, the greatest attention to, and the most detailed information of, all their affairs. However, by contending for the American representation, he seems at last driven virtually to admit, that great caution ought to be used in the exercise of all our legislative rights over an object so remote from our eye, and so little connected with our immediate feelings; that in prudence we ought not to be quite so ready with our taxes, until we can secure the desired representation in parliament. Perhaps it may be some time before this hopeful scheme can be brought to perfect maturity; although the author seems to be no wise aware of any obstructions that lie in the way of it.

While Knox, Grenville and Burke were not necessarily opposed in principle to direct colonial representation in Parliament, Grenville nonetheless conjectured that Parliament retained a constitutional right to virtually represent the colonial subjects.

==== On the American Taxation ====
Burke supported the doctrine of virtual representation in Britain. Yet in his Parliamentary speech of 1774, entitled On American Taxation, Burke responded to the suggestion that America was virtually represented in Parliament by remarking:

What! does the electric force of virtual representation more easily pass over the Atlantic than pervade Wales, which lies in your neighborhood? or than Chester and Durham, surrounded by abundance of representation that is actual and palpable? But, Sir, your ancestors thought this sort of virtual representation, however ample, to be totally insufficient for the freedom of the inhabitants of territories that are so near, and comparatively so inconsiderable. How, then, can I think it sufficient for those which are infinitely greater, and infinitely more remote? You will now, Sir, perhaps imagine that I am on the point of proposing to you a scheme for a representation of the colonies in Parliament. Perhaps I might be inclined to entertain some such thought; but a great flood stops me in my course. Opposuit Natura. I cannot remove the eternal barriers of the creation. The thing, in that mode, I do not know to be possible. As I meddle with no theory, I do not absolutely assert the impracticability of such a representation; but I do not see my way to it; and those who have been more confident have not been more successful ... My resolutions, therefore, mean to establish the equity and justice of a taxation of America by grant, and not by imposition; to mark the legal competency of the colony assemblies for the support of their government in peace, and for public aids in time of war; to acknowledge that this legal competency has had a dutiful and beneficial exercise, and that experience has shown the benefit of their grants, and the futility of Parliamentary taxation, as a method of supply.

However, Burke apparently qualified such remarks concerning America by stating in the same speech that:

The Parliament of Great Britain ... is never to intrude into the place of the [provincial legislatures], whilst they are equal to the common ends of their institution. But in order to enable [Parliamentary] ... superintendence, her powers must be boundless. The gentlemen who think the powers of Parliament limited may please themselves to talk of requisitions. But suppose the requisitions are not obeyed? What! shall there be no reserved power in the empire, to supply a deficiency which may weaken, divide, and dissipate the whole? We are engaged in war,—the Secretary of State calls upon the colonies to contribute,—some would do it, I think most would cheerfully furnish whatever is demanded,—one or two, suppose, hang back, and, easing themselves, let the stress of the draft lie on the others,—surely it is proper that some authority might legally say, 'Tax yourselves for the common Supply, or Parliament will do it for you.' This backwardness was, as I am told, actually the case of Pennsylvania for some short time towards the beginning of the last war, owing to some internal dissensions in that colony. But whether the fact were so or otherwise, the case is equally to be provided for by a competent sovereign power. But then this ought to be no ordinary power, nor ever used in the first instance. This is what I meant, when I have said, at various times, that I consider the power of taxing in Parliament as an instrument of empire, and not as a means of supply.

==== William Pitt the Elder ====
The views of Knox, Grenville and Burke did not go unchallenged: William Pitt was amongst those who disputed that a Parliamentary right or power existed to levy "internal" taxes "for the purposes of raising a revenue" without the consent of actual representatives of the "Commons of America". "It is my opinion," Pitt said, "that this kingdom has no right to lay a tax upon the colonies." Pitt ridiculed the theory of virtual representation, calling it "the most contemptible idea that ever entered into the head of a man; it does not deserve serious refutation." Pitt said to the House of Commons in 1766,

It is my opinion, that this kingdom has no right to lay a tax upon the colonies...The taxes are a voluntary gift and grant of the Commons alone...When, therefore, in this House we give and grant, we give and grant what is our own. But in an American tax, what do we do? "We, your majesty's Commons for Great Britain, give and grant to your majesty"—what? Our own property! No! "We give and grant to your majesty" the property of your majesty's Commons of America! It is an absurdity in terms...There is an idea in some that the colonies are virtually represented in the House. I would fain know by whom an American is represented here. Is he represented by any knight of the shire, in any county in this kingdom? Would to God that respectable representation was augmented to a greater number! Or will you tell him that he is represented by any representative of a borough?—a borough which, perhaps, its own representatives never saw! This is what is called the rotten part of the Constitution. It can not continue a century. If it does not drop, it must be amputated.

Pitt then stated to Parliament that, "I myself would have cited the two cases of Chester and Durham...to show that, even under former arbitrary reigns, Parliaments were ashamed of taxing a people without their consent, and allowed them representatives...[A] higher example [might be found] in Wales—Wales that never was taxed by Parliament till it was incorporated. Pitt pointed out that, unlike the "India company, merchants, stockholders, [and] manufacturers" who "have it in their option to be actually represented...have connections with those that elect, and...have influence over them," the colonists had no such option, connections or influence.

==== Colonial spokespersons ====
In 1764, the Massachusetts politician James Otis, Jr., said that:

When the parliament shall think fit to allow the colonists a representation in the house of commons, the equity of their taxing the colonies, will be as clear as their power is at present of doing it without, if they please ... But if it was thought hard that charter privileges should be taken away by act of parliament, is it not much harder to be in part, or in whole, disfranchised of rights, that have been always thought inherent to a British subject, namely, to be free from all taxes, but what he consents to in person, or by his representative? This right, if it could be traced no higher than Magna Charta, is part of the common law, part of a British subjects birthright, and as inherent and perpetual, as the duty of allegiance; both which have been brought to these colonies, and have been hitherto held sacred and inviolable, and I hope and trust ever will. It is humbly conceived, that the British colonists (except only the conquered, if any) are, by Magna Charta, as well entitled to have a voice in their taxes, as the subjects within the realm. Are we not as really deprived of that right, by the parliament assessing us before we are represented in the house of commons, as if the King should do it by his prerogative? Can it be said with any colour of truth or justice, that we are represented in parliament?

— James Otis, Rights of British Colonies Asserted

Otis, Jr., attended the Stamp Act Congress of 1765 along with other colonial delegates. The resolutions of the Congress stated that the Stamp Act had "a manifest tendency to subvert the rights and liberties of the colonists" and that "the only Representatives of the People of these Colonies, are Persons chosen therein by themselves, and that no Taxes ever have been, or can be Constitutionally imposed on them, but by their respective Legislature." Furthermore, it was declared that, "it is unreasonable and inconsistent with the Principles and Spirit of the British Constitution, for the People of Great-Britain, to grant to his Majesty the Property of the Colonists."

Daniel Dulany, Jr., of Maryland, wrote in an influential 1765 pamphlet that, "the Impropriety of a Taxation by the British Parliament ... [is proven by] the Fact, that not one inhabitant in any Colony is, or can be actually or virtually represented by the British House of Commons." Dulany, Jr., denied that Parliament had a right "to impose an internal Tax upon the Colonies, without their consent for the single Purpose of Revenue."

In 1766, Benjamin Franklin told the House of Commons that, "an internal tax is forced from the people without their consent if not laid by their own representatives. The Stamp Act says we shall have no commerce, make no exchange of property with each other, neither purchase nor grant, nor recover debts; we shall neither marry nor make our wills, unless we pay such and such sums; and thus it is intended to extort our money from us or ruin us by the consequence of refusing to pay it."

==== Republicanism ====
To those sympathetic to republicanism, such as James Burgh, Catherine Macauley, and Richard Price, any tax revenue measures that were voted into effect without the direct representation of Americans were "unconstitutional" and "pernicious". Burgh felt that virtual representation was "subversive of liberty" and "unjust in its principles" and that the House of Commons must include colonial representatives when it voted on colonial matters, or operate by using the consent of the colonial Assemblies.

==== Heightening of tensions ====
American colonists rejected the Stamp Act 1765 brought in by British Prime Minister George Grenville, and initiated boycotts of British goods which helped bring about the repeal of the act in 1766. The passage of the Townshend Acts in 1767 and 1768 again led to colonial protests, including a renewed boycott movement against British wares. Most of the taxes in the Townshend Acts were repealed in 1770 by the Ministry of Lord North. The passage of the Tea Act 1773 in May 1773, which enforced the remaining taxes on tea, led to the Boston Tea Party on December 16, 1773. Parliament considered this an illegal act because they believed it undermined the authority of the Crown-in-Parliament. When the British then used the military to enforce laws that the colonists believed Parliament had passed illegally, the colonists responded by forming militias and seized political control of each colony, ousting the royal governors – with the exception of the American-born Royal Governor of Connecticut, Jonathan Trumbull, who was allowed to remain as the new Patriot Governor.

The complaint was never officially over the amount of taxation (the taxes were quite low, though ubiquitous), but always on the political decision-making process by which taxes were decided in London, i.e. without representation for the colonists in British Parliament.

Patrick Henry's resolution in the Virginia legislature implied that Americans possessed all the rights of Englishmen, that the principle of no taxation without representation was an essential part of the British Constitution, and that Virginia alone had the right to tax Virginians.

==== Efforts at conciliation ====
This offer of actual imperial representation was likewise re-stated to the delegates of the colonies via the colonial agents in 1774, according to Connecticut-born Reverend Thomas Bradbury Chandler, in his publication A Friendly Address to All Reasonable Americans. In February 1775, Britain passed the Conciliatory Resolution which ended taxation for any colony which satisfactorily provided for the imperial defence and the upkeep of imperial officers.

=== Representative proposals after 1776 ===
James Macpherson, a colonial secretary of British West Florida, defended the North administration in an officially sponsored polemic in 1776 named The Rights of Great Britain Asserted. This work replied to the Continental Congress' July 6, 1775 Declaration of the Causes and Necessity of Taking Up Arms by proposing that,

Had the Americans, instead of flying to arms, submitted the same supposed grievance [as the taxed though unrepresented Palatine counties in England had], in a peaceable and dutiful manner, to the Legislature, I can perceive no reason why their request should be refused. Had they, like the County and City of Chester, represented, that "for lack of Knights and Burgesses to represent them in the High Court of Parliament, they had been oftentimes TOUCHED and GRIEVED with Acts and Statutes made within the said Court, derogatory to their most ancient jurisdictions, liberties and privileges, and prejudicial to their quietness, rest and peace;" this Country [of Britain] would, I am persuaded, have no objection to their being represented in her Parliament ... If they are not madly bent on independence, let them propose the conditions on which they wish to continue as subjects ... The Legislature of this Kingdom cannot possibly depart from any part of its supremacy over the Colonies; but it is in the power of the Colonies to share in that supremacy. If they complain of being taxed without having the privilege of sending Members to Parliament, let them be represented. Nay, more: Let their representation increase in proportion to the Revenue they shall furnish. If they wish rather to vote their QUOTA towards the general supply, through their own General Courts and Assemblies, the resolution of Parliament on that subject is still open to their choice. But, as long as they assume the language of a Sovereign State, this Kingdom can enter into no negociation [sic], can meet no compromise."

The noted economist Adam Smith seconded this view in his famous 1776 publication Wealth of Nations when he recommended the Americans "to send fifty or sixty new representatives to Parliament" on the basis of the amount of taxes they would contribute to the Imperial coffers. Writing in October 1776 to Lord North in Strictures upon the Declaration of the Congress of the recent Declaration of Independence, and particularly of James Otis, Jr.'s pamphlet Rights of the British Colonies and its endorsement by the Massachusetts Assembly, Governor Thomas Hutchinson said,

The Assembly of Massachusetts Bay, therefore, was the first that took any publick of the [Sugar] Act, and the first which ever took exception to the right of Parliament to impose Duties or Taxes on the Colonies, whilst they had no representatives in the House of Commons. This they did in a letter to their Agent in the summer of 1764, which they took care to print and publish before it was possible for him to receive it. And in this letter they recommend to him a pamphlet, wrote by one of their members, in which there are proposals for admitting representatives from the Colonies to fit in the House of Commons. I have this special reason, my Lord, for taking notice of this Act of the Massachusetts Assembly; that though an American representation is thrown out as an expedient which might obviate the objections to Taxes upon the Colonies, yet it was only intended to amuse the authority in England; and as soon as it was known to have its advocates here [in London], it was renounced by the colonies, and even by the Assembly of the Colony which first proposed it, as utterly impracticable."

Indeed, the resolves of the Continental Congresses of both 1765 and 1774 declared that imperial representation was too impractical on the footing that "local and other circumstances, cannot properly be represented in the British parliament". The British Government, similarly, does not appear to have formally requested discussions with the Americans concerning the issue of Parliamentary seats until 1778. In that year "the commissioners of the king of Great Britain," known as the Carlisle Peace Commission of 1778, made an offer to the Congress of "a reciprocal deputation of an agent or agents from the different states, who shall have the privilege of a seat and voice in the parliament of Great Britain".

== Virtual representation ==
In Britain, representation was highly limited due to unequally distributed voting constituencies and property requirements; only 3% of the population could vote and they were often controlled by local gentry. This meant that spurious arguments had come to be employed in Britain to try to explain away and cover up the iniquities in its political life. Therefore the British government tried to argue that the colonists had virtual representation in their interests. In the winter of 1764–65, George Grenville, and his secretary Thomas Whately, utilized the doctrine of 'virtual representation' in an attempt to extend the scope of such unjust arguments to America, and thereby attempt to legitimize the pernicious policies of the Stamp Act.

In English history, "no taxation without representation" was an old principle and meant that Parliament had to pass all taxes. At first, the "representation" was held to be one of land, but, by 1700, this had shifted to the notion that, in Parliament, all British subjects had a "virtual representation." "We virtually and implicitly allow the institutions of any government of which we enjoy the benefit and solicit the protection," declared Samuel Johnson in his political pamphlet Taxation No Tyranny. He rejected the plea that the colonists, who had no vote, were unrepresented. "They are represented," he said, "by the same virtual representation as the greater part of England." However, the tradition of greater democracy amongst Americans gave impetus to the well-founded charge, voiced by Britons and colonists alike, that virtual representation was "sophistry" and "a mere Cob-web, spread to catch the unwary, and intangle [sic] the weak." The colonial insistence on direct representation as opposed to virtual representation has thus been seen by later commentators to have "usher[ed] in a profound political and social revolution, which rooted out most of the remaining traces of monarchic rule and feudalism inherited from the only partially complete English bourgeois revolution. The Americans carried through the bourgeois democratic revolution on a scale never before seen in history."

=== Colonial reactions ===
Virtual representation was wholly rejected in the colonies also. The colonial position was that the "virtual" was a cover for political corruption and was irreconcilable with their belief that government derives its just powers from the consent of the governed. In 1765, the American lawyer and politician James Otis, Jr., responded to Soame Jenyns' The Objections to the Taxation of Our American Colonies, by the Legislature of Great Britain, Briefly Considered. Otis' own publication was entitled Considerations on Behalf of the Colonists, in a Letter to a Noble Lord. He wrote in it, "To what purpose is it to ring everlasting changes to the colonists on the cases of Manchester, Birmingham and Sheffield, who return no members? If those now so considerable places are not represented, they ought to be." Writing in his 1763 publication The Rights of the British Colonies Asserted and Proved, Otis declared that,

Every British subject born on the continent of America, or in any other of the British dominions, is by the law of God and nature, by the common law, and by act of parliament, (exclusive of all charters from the Crown) entitled to all the natural, essential, inherent and inseparable rights of our fellow subjects in Great Britain. Among those rights ... which it is humbly conceived no man or body of men, not excepting the parliament, justly, equitably and consistently with their own rights and the constitution, can take away ... [are that the] supreme and subordinate powers of the legislation should be free and sacred in the hands where the community have once rightfully placed them ... [that the] supreme national legislative cannot be altered justly 'till the commonwealth is dissolved, nor a subordinate legislative taken away without forfeiture or other good cause. Nor then can the subjects in the subordinate government be reduced to a state of slavery, and subject to the despotic rule of others ... Even when the subordinate right of legislature is forfeited, and so declared, this cannot affect the natural persons either of those who were invested with it, or the inhabitants, so far as to deprive them of the rights of subjects and of men — The colonists will have an equitable right notwithstanding any such forfeiture of charter, to be represented in Parliament, or to have some new subordinate legislature among themselves. It would be best if they had both ... [Furthermore, the right of every British subject is that the] supreme power cannot take from any man any part of his property, without his consent in person, or by representation.

Otis simultaneously refuted, in The Rights of the British Colonies Asserted and Proved, a contemporary argument that attempted to rationalise virtual representation on the basis of the colonial agents' alleged influence on British policy. "As to the colonists being represented by the provincial agents," he wrote,

I know of no power ever given them but to appear before his Majesty, and his ministry. Sometimes they have been directed to petition the parliament: But they none of them have, and I hope never will have, a power given them, by the colonists, to act as representatives, and to consent to taxes; and if they should make any concessions to the ministry, especially without order, the provinces could not by that be considered as represented in parliament.

Colonists said no man was represented if he were not allowed to vote. Moreover, even "If every inhabitant of America had the requisite freehold," said Daniel Dulany, "not one could vote, but upon the supposition of his ceasing to become an inhabitant of America, and becoming a resident of Great Britain." The colonists and like-minded Britons insisted that representation was achieved only through an assembly of men actually elected by the persons they were intended to represent.

The argument between the colonies and Parliament sought to resolve how the British 'commoners' of the various part of the Empire were represented most constitutionally – as Daniel Dulany, an American Loyalist and lawyer, put it "[the] constitutional authority [of Parliament's rights to bind American subjects] depends upon the single question, Whether the Commons of Great-Britain are virtually the representatives of the Commons of America, or not.

=== Pitt and Camden ===
The theory of virtual representation was attacked in Britain by Charles Pratt, 1st Earl Camden, and his ally William Pitt, 1st Earl of Chatham. William Pitt argued in 1766 that the Commons of Britain ought not to tax the '"Commons of America" without gaining consent of their representatives in stating, "even under former arbitrary reigns, Parliaments were ashamed of taxing a people without their consent, and allowed them representatives. Why did [Grenville] confine himself to Chester and Durham? He might have taken a higher example in Wales—Wales, that never was taxed by Parliament till it was incorporated." He then said,

I am no courtier of America. I stand up for this kingdom. I maintain that the Parliament has a right to bind, to restrain America. Our legislative power over the colonies is sovereign and supreme. When it ceases to be sovereign and supreme, I would advise every gentleman to sell his lands, if he can, and embark for that country. When two countries are connected together like England and her colonies, without being incorporated, the one must necessarily govern. The greater must rule the less. But she must so rule it as not to contradict the fundamental principles that are common to both ... let the sovereign authority of this country over the colonies be asserted in as strong terms as can be devised, and be made to extend to every point of legislation whatsoever; that we may bind their trade, confine their manufactures, and exercise every power whatsoever, except that of taking their money out of their pockets without their consent."

In his first speeches in Parliament, Lord Camden vigorously attacked the declaratory act which was proposed to mollify the crown on the repeal of the Stamp Tax. After his first affirmation of "no taxation without representation" Camden was attacked by British PM Grenville, Chief Justice James Mansfield, Robert Henley, 1st Earl of Northington, and others. He responded:

[T]he British Parliament have no right to tax the Americans. I shall not consider the Declaratory Bill now lying on your table; for to what purpose, but loss of time, to consider the particulars of a Bill, the very existence of which is illegal, absolutely illegal, contrary to the fundamental laws of nature, contrary to the fundamental laws of this constitution? A constitution grounded on the eternal and immutable laws of nature; a constitution whose foundation and centre is liberty, which sends liberty to every individual who may happen to be within any part of its ample circumference. Nor, my Lords, is the doctrine new, it is as old as the constitution; it grew up with it; indeed it is its support; taxation and representation are inseparably united; God hath joined them, no British parliament can separate them; to endeavour to do it, is to stab our very vitals. ... My position is this—I repeat it—I will maintain it to my last hour,—taxation and representation are inseparable; this position is founded on the laws of nature; it is more, it is itself an eternal law of nature; for whatever is a man's own, is absolutely his own; no man has a right to take it from him without his consent, either expressed by himself or representative; whoever attempts to do it, attempts an injury; whoever does it, commits a robbery; he throws down and destroys the distinction between liberty and slavery. Taxation and representation are coeval with and essential to the constitution. ... [T]here is not a blade of grass growing in the most obscure corner of this kingdom, which is not, which was not ever, represented since the constitution began; there is not a blade of grass, which when taxed, was not taxed by the consent of the proprietor. ... I can never give my assent to any bill for taxing the American colonies, while they remain unrepresented; for as to the distinction of a virtual representation, it is so absurd as not to deserve an answer; I therefore pass it over with contempt. The forefathers of the Americans did not leave their native country, and subject themselves to every danger and distress, to be reduced to a state of slavery: they did not give up their rights; they looked for protection, and not for chains, from their mother country; by her they expected to be defended in the possession of their property, and not to be deprived of it: for, should the present power continue, there is nothing which they can call their own; or, to use the words of Mr. Locke, 'What property have they in that, which another may, by right, take, when he pleases, to himself?'"

In an appearance before Parliament in January 1766, former Prime Minister William Pitt stated:

The idea of a virtual representation of America in this House is the most contemptible that ever entered into the head of a man. It does not deserve a serious refutation. The Commons of America, represented in their several assemblies, have ever been in possession of the exercise of this their constitutional right, of giving and granting their own money. They would have been slaves if they had not enjoyed it.

Grenville responded to Pitt, saying the disturbances in America "border on open rebellion; and if the doctrine I have heard this day be confirmed, nothing can tend more directly to produce a revolution." External and internal taxes are the same, argued Grenville.

== Modern use in the United States ==
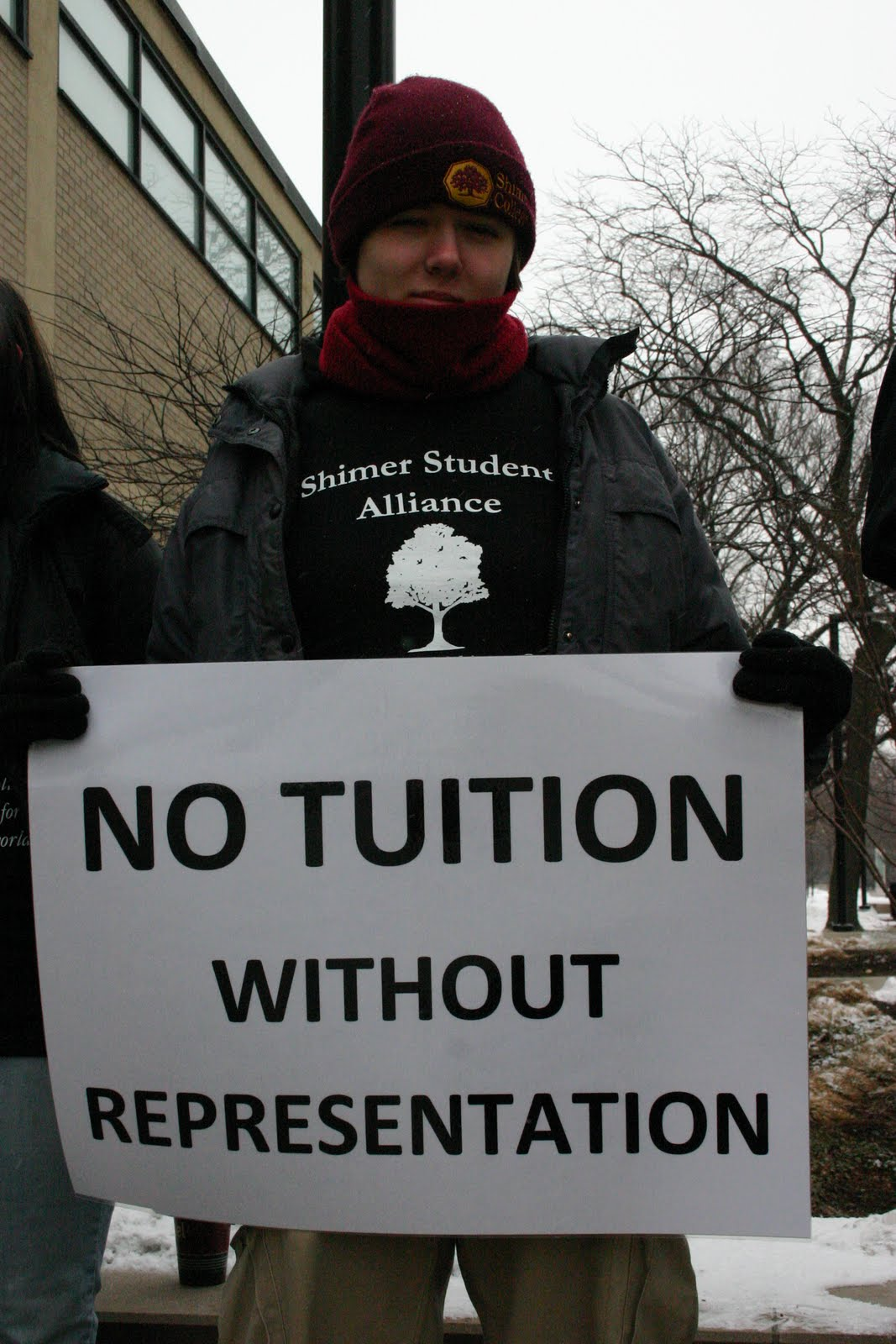
Shimer College student holds "No tuition without representation" sign during protest over school governance in 2010.

In the 1860s, suffragette Sarah E. Wall of Worcester, Massachusetts invoked the principle of "no taxation without representation", initiating an anti-tax protest in which she encouraged women not to pay taxes until they were granted the right to vote. Soon after she began this movement, the Worcester city tax collector sued Wall for refusing to pay taxes, and the case reached the Massachusetts Supreme Court in 1863. In "Wheeler v. Wall," the court ruled against Wall and held that despite not having the right to vote, women were still obligated to meet their tax burden. Even still, Wall refused to cooperate with the collector, and as a result, officers seized and sold her property in order to raise the money necessary to meet her tax obligation. After several years, Wall's inexorability eventually prevailed, as the collector began to ignore Wall and allow her to abstain from paying taxes. In 1884, Susan B. Anthony cited Wall's audacity and willingness to stand up for women's suffrage, stating, "for the last twenty-five years, [she] has resisted the tax gatherer when he came around. I want you to look at her. She looks very harmless, but she will not pay a dollar of tax. She says when the Commonwealth of Massachusetts will give her the right of representation she will pay her taxes."

The phrase is also used by other groups in America who pay various types of taxes (sales, income, property) but lack the ability to vote, such as felons (who are, in many states, barred from voting), people who work in one state and live in another (thus having to pay income tax to a state they don't live in), or people under 18.

To become citizens of the United States, immigrants most often must be permanent residents for a period of time (usually five years). Permanent residents must pay taxes on their worldwide income and, in most cases, cannot vote. However, throughout the 19th century, many states did allow immigrants to vote after they had declared their intention to become citizens. This was primarily because these new states were populated in large part by immigrants who had not yet attained citizenship. Throughout U.S. history, non-citizens have been allowed to vote in 40 U.S. states and territories. As of 2005, non-citizens are allowed to vote in seven jurisdictions in the United States: Chicago and six towns in Montgomery County, Maryland. As of 2021, both Montpelier and Winooski, Vermont allow non-citizens to vote in municipal elections.

In 2009, the phrase "taxation without representation" was also used in the Tea Party protests, where protesters were upset over increased government spending and taxes, and specifically regarding a growing concern amongst the group that the U.S. government is increasingly relying upon a form of taxation without representation through increased regulatory levies and fees which are allegedly passed via unelected government employees who have no direct responsibility to voters and cannot be held accountable by the public through elections.

A modified version of the phrase, "no tuition without representation", is sometimes used in disputes over governance in higher education in the United States to emphasize student's rights to a voice in institutional decisions. The term first emerged in a 1977 dispute at Union County College in New Jersey. It has been used more recently in disputes at Dartmouth College, UC Berkeley School of Law, and elsewhere.

=== District of Columbia ===
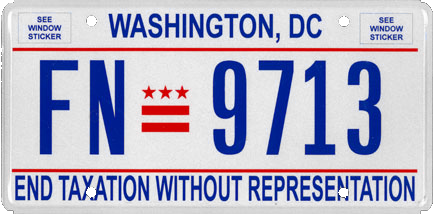
The standard-issue District of Columbia license plate bears the phrase, "End Taxation Without Representation".

In the United States, the phrase is used in the District of Columbia as part of the campaign for a vote in Congress, to publicize the fact that District of Columbia residents pay federal taxes, but do not have representation in Congress. In November 2000, the D.C. Department of Motor Vehicles began issuing license plates bearing the slogan "Taxation without representation". In a show of support for the city, President Bill Clinton used the "Taxation Without Representation" plates on the presidential limousine; however, President George W. Bush had the tags replaced to those without the motto shortly after taking office. President Barack Obama announced his intention to use the plates with the motto beginning at his second inauguration. President Donald Trump continued usage of the plates with the protest motto after he was elected, though he has stated he has "no position" on the issue of granting D.C. statehood. In 2017, the phrase was modified to "End Taxation Without Representation".

In 2002, the Council of the District of Columbia authorized adding the slogan to the D.C. flag, but no new flag design was approved. In 2007, the District of Columbia and United States Territories Quarters program was created based on the successful 50 State Quarters program. DC submitted designs containing the slogan, but they were rejected by the U.S. Mint.

== In other countries ==
=== Use in Australia ===
The first government of South Australia was by a legislative council, whose members were chosen by the Crown and from which office-bearers "Official Members" were selected by the Governor. John Stephens and his South Australian Register were among those who campaigned for democratic reform. Partial reform took place in 1851, when a majority of Members of the South Australian Legislative Council, 1851–1855 were elected.

=== Modern use in Canada ===
In Canada, Quebec politician Gilles Duceppe, former leader of the Bloc Québécois, has repeatedly cited this phrase in defending the presence of his party in Ottawa. The Bloc is a Québec sovereigntist party solely running candidates in Canadian Federal elections in the province of Québec. Duceppe's evocation of the phrase implies that the proponents of Quebec's sovereigntist movement have the right to be represented in the body (which they are), the Canadian Parliament, which levies taxes upon them. He will usually cite the sentence in its original English.

=== Modern use in Indonesia ===
During the 2025 Indonesian protests, Indonesian online users in solidarity with the protests have used a translated version of the term in Indonesian inside a mock emergency population warning screen originally created as an analog horror, often associated with the movement, to oppose the planned 12% value-added tax hikes during the Prabowo administration.

=== Modern use in the United Kingdom ===
British Prime Minister John Major used a modified version of the quote, with the order reversed, in October 1995, when at the United Nations's 50th Anniversary celebrations he said, "It is not sustainable for states to enjoy representation without taxation," in order to criticize the billion-dollar arrears of the United States' payments to the UN, echoing a statement made the previous month at the opening session of the UN General Assembly by UK Foreign Secretary Malcolm Rifkind.

== See also ==
- Social contract
- Tax resistance in the United States
- 1628 Petition of Right
- One person, one vote
