= Daniel Dulany the Elder =

American politician (1685–1753)

Daniel Dulany
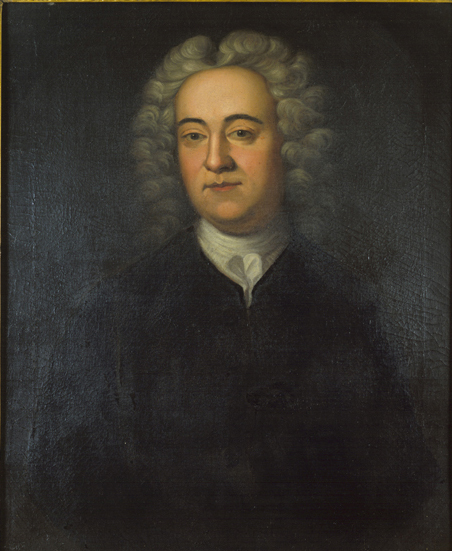

Receiver General

Member, Maryland General Assembly
- In office 1722–c. 1742

Member, Governor's Council

Judge of Admiralty

Personal details
- Born: 1685 Queen's County, Kingdom of Ireland
- Died: 1753 (aged 67–68) Annapolis, Province of Maryland, British North America
- Domestic partner: Rebecca Smith
- Children: Daniel Dulany the Younger
- Occupation: lawyer, politician

Daniel Dulany the Elder (1685–1753) was a lawyer and land-developer in colonial Maryland, who held a number of colonial offices. In 1722 Dulany wrote a pamphlet entitled The Right of the Inhabitants of Maryland, to the Benefit of the English Laws, asserting the rights of Marylanders over the Proprietary Government.

== Early life ==
Dulany was born in Upperwoods, Queen's County, Ireland about 1685. In November 1702, a flotilla of merchantmen, known as the "Armada of 100 ships" sailed for the Chesapeake Bay, arriving in March, 1703. Dulany, along with two older brothers (William and Joseph) landed at Port Tobacco, and became indentured to Colonel George Plater II for a three-year period. Plater put Dulany to work as a law clerk. In 1709 Dulany was admitted to the Charles County bar. In 1717 Dulany was admitted to Gray's Inn.

== Politics ==
In 1720, Dulany moved to Annapolis. In 1722, he was elected to represent the town in the Lower House of the Maryland General Assembly. From 1724 until 1739, he represented Anne Arundel County in the Lower House. He again represented Annapolis from 1739 to 1742 before being elected to the Upper House in 1742 and remaining in that office until his death in 1753.

At that time the Province of Maryland was under the proprietary governorship of Charles Calvert, 5th Baron Baltimore. Lord Baltimore vetoed a bill in 1722 which the General Assembly had passed in order to bring the colony fully under all English statute law. Dulany led protests against this, writing a pamphlet in 1728 entitled "The Right of the Inhabitants of Maryland, to the Benefit of the English Laws".

Lord Baltimore later appointed Dulany to the posts of Receiver General, Judge of Admiralty, and Commissary General, as well as appointing him to the Governor's Council.

== Border dispute with Pennsylvania ==
In the 1730s, under the rule of Governor Samuel Ogle, Maryland became engaged in a border dispute with Pennsylvania. Several settlers were taken prisoners on both sides and Penn sent a committee to Governor Ogle to resolve the situation. Rioting broke out in the disputed territory and Ogle appealed to the King for resolution. In 1736 Ogle dispatched Dulany to Philadelphia in order to negotiate the release of a number of imprisoned Marylanders, though without success, and the border warfare continued.

== Lawyer, planter, land developer ==
Dulany became wealthy from his legal practice, and through the 1720s began to accumulate and develop land. He advertised for tenants to settle his land in Baltimore, Kent and Prince George's county, paying with tobacco, corn or wheat. He is credited with the founding of Frederick.

== Personal life ==
Coat of Arms of Daniel Dulany

Dulany married three times, first to Charity Courts Smallwood, widow of Bayne Smallwood. She died one year after wedding Daniel. By his second wife Rebecca Smith, the daughter of Colonel Walter Smith, he had a large family, not atypical for the time:

- Daniel Dulany the Younger (1722–1797), a noted Maryland Loyalist, Mayor of Annapolis, who played a prominent role in Maryland during the American Revolution.
- Walter Dulany (1722-1773), who would also become Mayor of Annapolis.
- Rebecca
- Rachel
- Mary
- Margaret, who married doctor Alexander Hamilton in 1747.

Daniel married a third time to Henrietta Maria Lloyd Chew, a widow. By her he had another child, Lloyd.

=== Death ===
Dulany died on December 5, 1753, in Annapolis. At the time of his death, the value of his estate was £10,921.9.8 current money, including 187 slaves. A significant landowner and planter, he owned more than 10,000 acres of land in five counties.

After his death, in 1754, Dulany's third wife, Henrietta Maria, appeared before Michael MacNamara, then Deputy Commissioner of Anne Arundel County, seeking to overturn the will of her late husband.

== See also ==
- Colonial families of Maryland
