= Conciliatory Resolution =

Peace resolution passed by British Parliament in 1776

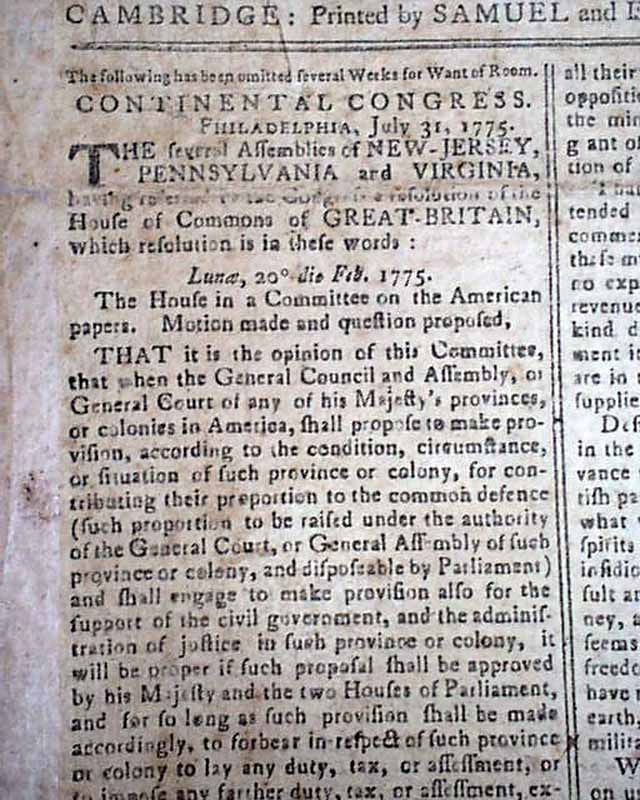
Response of the Continental Congress to the Conciliatory Resolution, published in a New England newspaper in 1775

The Conciliatory Resolution was a resolution proposed by Lord North and passed by the British Parliament in February 1775, in an attempt to reach a peaceful settlement with the Thirteen Colonies about two months prior to the outbreak of the American Revolutionary War. It allowed any colony that agreed to contribute to the public defense, as well as to support civil government and the administration of justice, as approved by the Crown and the two Houses of Parliament, to be exempt from taxation. Taxes for the regulation of commerce would continue to be levied, but their net produce would be returned to the colony. The resolution arrived in the American colonies after war had broken out in Massachusetts, and was rejected by the Continental Congress.

== Background ==
In January 1775, Parliament considered petitions from the colonies in relation to the Coercive Acts, including a petition to the king from the First Continental Congress, and discussed ways to resolve the crisis with the Thirteen Colonies. A proposal by William Pitt to recognize colonial self-government was rejected by the House of Lords. Pitt then moved for the withdrawal of troops from Boston, but that motion was defeated. In February, Pitt presented a plan of conciliation based upon mutual concessions, but this was also rejected. On February 2, despite fierce opposition from some members of Parliament, Massachusetts was declared to be in rebellion. Lord North took the unexpected (for him) role of conciliator for the drafting of a conciliatory resolution which was proposed on February 20, 1775, and dated on February 27.

The bill also followed shortly after a failed proposal by Lord Chatham, which was heavily defeated in Parliament due to its favorability towards America. This bill provided the American freedom from taxation without consent, asking for consent to provide revenue toward Great Britain for expenses relating to the colonies. It also provided for the recognition of the Continental Congress, colonial jury trials, and the repeal of the Quebec Act and all other punitive measures in Boston and Massachusetts, as well as addressing a number of other colonial issues. However, it allowed Britain to maintain a standing army within the colonies. Rather than being a definitive settlement, it was intended to facilitate discussion between the two parties.

== Resolution ==
The Conciliatory Resolution declared that any colony that contributed to the common defense and provided support for the civil government and the administration of justice (ostensibly against any anti-Crown rebellion) would be relieved of paying taxes or duties except those necessary for the regulation of commerce. The "nett produce of [duties related to the regulation of commerce]" was to be "carried to the account of such [colony] respectively." Each colony's contribution and support was required to be "approved by his Majesty and the two Houses of Parliament".

It was debated in Parliament on February 20, 1775. American supporters in Parliament were generally unsupportive of the proposal. A number of members of Parliament, however, saw the proposal as fair and believed that if it was rejected, it would prove that Americans truly only desired independence, and that taxation was only a cover. It passed 274 in favor, 88 against.

== Reception in the United States ==
The resolution was addressed and sent to the individual colonies, and intentionally ignored the extralegal Continental Congress. By doing this, Lord North hoped to divide the colonists amongst themselves and thus weaken any revolution/independence movements (especially those represented by the Continental Congress). In any case, news of the resolution did not reach the colonies until after fighting broke out between Massachusetts militia and British troops on April 19, 1775.

The Virginia House of Burgesses, officially disbanded by the Earl of Dunmore in 1774, reconvened in June 1775 and rejected the resolution. The Continental Congress convened a committee to consider it on July 22, 1775, over a month after the Battle of Bunker Hill, rejecting with a response similar to Virginia's.

The Continental Congress representing the thirteen colonies rejected the proposal as an infringement on their exclusive right to raise revenue. In contrast, the loyal colony of Nova Scotia accepted it. Nova Scotia suggested raising the revenue by imposing a duty on foreign imports, this was granted by Parliament which then repealed all other taxes (except those related to commerce) on Nova Scotia.

== Full text of the Resolution ==
Resolved, That it is the opinion of this Committee, that when the Governour, Council, and Assembly, or General Court, of any of his Majesty's Provinces or Colonies in America, shall propose to make provision, according to the condition, circumstances, and situation of such Province or Colony, for contributing their proportion to the common defence, (such proportion to be raised under the authority of the General Court, or General Assembly of such Province or Colony, and disposable by Parliament,) and shall engage to make provision also for the support of the Civil Government, and the Administration of Justice, in such Province or Colony, it will be proper if such proposal shall be approved by his Majesty and the two Houses of Parliament, and for so long as such provision shall be made accordingly, to forbear, in respect of such Province or Colony, to levy any Duty, Tax, or Assessment, or to impose any farther Duty, Tax, or Assessment, except only such Duties as it may be expedient to continue to levy or to impose for the regulation of commerce; the nett produce of the duties last mentioned to be carried to the account of such Province or Colony respectively.

== Receipt and rejection by Congress ==
The Continental Congress did eventually receive the Conciliatory Resolution in the form of a communication from the assembly of New Jersey on May 26, 1775. Two months later, on July 31, Congress released a report rejecting the resolution on behalf of the colonies. In the meantime it released its own Declaration of the Causes and Necessity of Taking Up Arms. The committee that wrote both documents consisted of Benjamin Franklin, Thomas Jefferson, John Adams, and Richard Henry Lee.)

The report on the Conciliatory Resolution asserted that “ colonies of America are entitled to the sole and exclusive privilege of giving and granting their own money.…”

To propose, therefore, as this resolution does, that the monies given by the colonies shall be subject to the disposal of parliament alone, is to, propose that they shall relinquish this right of enquiry, and put it in the power of others to render their gifts ruinous, in proportion as they are liberal....The proposition seems also to have been calculated more particularly to lull into fatal security, our well-affected fellow-subjects on the other side [of] the water, till time should be given for the operation of those arms, which a British minister pronounced would instantaneously reduce the "cowardly" sons of America to unreserved submission. But, when the world reflects, how inadequate to justice are these vaunted terms; when it attends to the rapid and bold succession of injuries, which, during the course of eleven years, have been aimed at these colonies; when it reviews the pacific and respectful expostulations, which, during that whole time, were the sole arms we opposed to them; when it observes that our complaints were either not heard at all, or were answered with new and accumulated injuries; when it recollects that the minister himself, on an early occasion, declared, "that he would never treat with America, till he had brought her to his feet," and that an avowed partisan of ministry has more lately denounced against us the dreadful sentence, "delenda est Carthago;" that this was done in presence of a British Senate and being unreproved by them, must be taken to be their own sentiment, (especially as the purpose has already in part been carried into execution, by their treatment of Boston and burning of Charlestown;) when it considers the great armaments with which they have invaded us, and the circumstances of cruelty with which these have commenced and prosecuted hostilities; when these things, we say, are laid together and attentively considered, can the world be deceived into an opinion that we are unreasonable, or can it hesitate to believe with us, that nothing but our own exertions may defeat the ministerial sentence of death or abject submission.

== Bibliography ==
- Stedman, Charles. History of the Origin, Progress, and Termination of the American War Volume I (1794) pp. 163-64
