= Virtual representation =

Concept that UK parliamentarians spoke on behalf of all imperial subjects

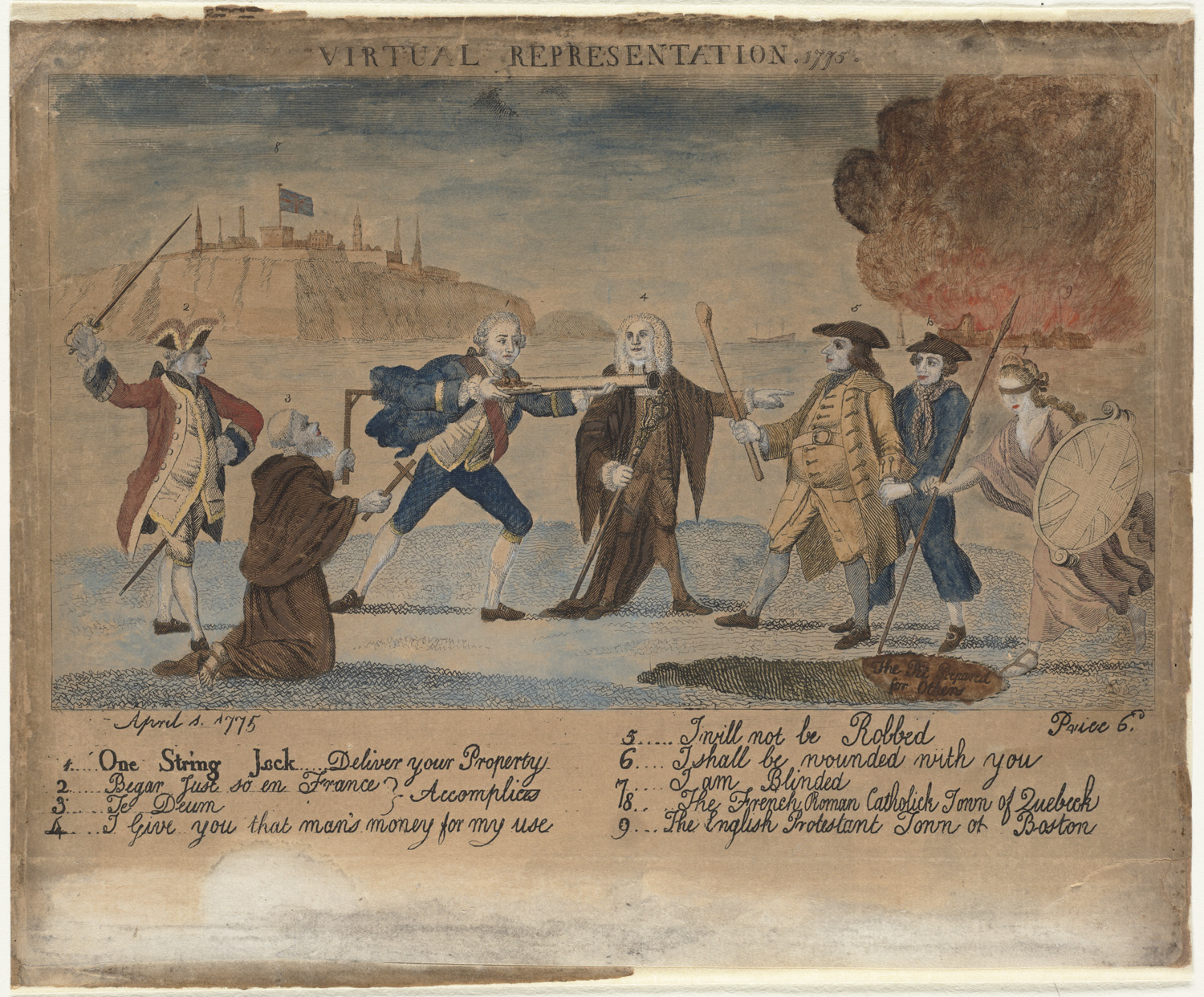
Virtual Representative (standing, clad in brown) gives the Government (with blunderbuss) permission to rob a colonist. Catholic Quebec enjoys peace, Protestant Boston burns, and blinded Britannia approaches a pit. 1775 cartoon

The concept of virtual representation proposed that the members of the UK Parliament, including the Lords and the Crown-in-Parliament, reserved the right to speak for the interests of all British subjects, rather than for the interests of only the district that elected them or for the regions in which they held peerages and spiritual sway. Virtual representation was the British response to the First Continental Congress in the American colonies. The Second Continental Congress asked for representation in Parliament in the Suffolk Resolves, also known as the first Olive Branch Petition. Parliament claimed that their members had the well being of the colonists in mind. The patriots in the Colonies rejected this premise.

== American Revolution ==
In the early stages of the American Revolution, colonists in the Thirteen Colonies rejected legislation imposed upon them by the Parliament of Great Britain because the colonies were not represented in Parliament. According to the British constitution, colonists argued, taxes could be levied on British subjects only with their consent. Because the colonists were represented only in their provincial assemblies, they said, only those legislatures could levy taxes in the colonies. This concept was famously expressed as "No taxation without representation".

=== Development ===
During the winter of 1764–1765, British MP George Grenville and his lieutenant, Thomas Whately, attempted to explicitly articulate a theory that could justify the lack of representation in colonial taxation. Grenville and Whately's theory, known as "virtual representation" put forth that, just like the vast majority of British citizens who could not vote, the colonists were nonetheless virtually represented in Parliament. Thus Grenville defended all the taxes by arguing that the colonists were virtually represented in Parliament, a position that had critics on both sides of the British Empire. Parliament rejected any criticism that virtual representation was constitutionally invalid as a whole, and passed the Declaratory Act in 1766, asserting the right of Parliament to legislate for the colonies "all cases whatsoever."

=== Reaction ===
The idea of virtual representation "found little support on either side of the Atlantic" as a means of solving the constitutional controversy between colonists and Britons. William Pitt, a defender of colonial rights, ridiculed virtual representation, calling it "the most contemptible idea that ever entered into the head of a man; it does not deserve serious refutation." Pitt said to the House of Commons in 1766,

It is my opinion, that this kingdom has no right to lay a tax upon the colonies...The taxes are a voluntary gift and grant of the Commons alone...When, therefore, in this House we give and grant, we give and grant what is our own. But in an American tax, what do we do? "We, your majesty’s Commons for Great Britain, give and grant to your majesty"—what? Our own property! No! "We give and grant to your majesty" the property of your majesty’s Commons of America! It is an absurdity in terms...There is an idea in some that the colonies are virtually represented in the House. I would fain know by whom an American is represented here. Is he represented by any knight of the shire, in any county in this kingdom? Would to God that respectable representation was augmented to a greater number! Or will you tell him that he is represented by any representative of a borough?—a borough which, perhaps, its own representatives never saw! This is what is called the rotten part of the Constitution. It can not continue a century. If it does not drop, it must be amputated.

Pitt then stated to Parliament that, "I myself would have cited the two cases of Chester and Durham...to show that, even under former arbitrary reigns, Parliaments were ashamed of taxing a people without their consent, and allowed them representatives...[A] higher example [might be found] in Wales—Wales that never was taxed by Parliament till it was incorporated. Pitt pointed out that, unlike the "India company, merchants, stockholders, [and] manufacturers" who "have it in their option to be actually represented...have connections with those that elect, and...have influence over them," the colonists had no such option, connections or influence.

Benjamin Franklin told the House of Commons that, "I know that whenever taxation has occurred in conversation where I have been present, it has appeared to be the opinion of every one that we could not be taxed by a Parliament wherein we were not represented...An external tax is a duty laid on commodities imported; that duty is added to the first cost and other charges on the commodity, and, when it is offered for sale, makes a part of the price. If the people do not like it at that price, they refuse it; they are not obliged to pay it. But an internal tax is forced from the people without their consent if not laid by their own representatives. The Stamp Act says we shall have no commerce, make no exchange of property with each other, neither purchase nor grant, nor recover debts; we shall neither marry nor make our wills, unless we pay such and such sums; and thus it is intended to extort our money from us or ruin us by the consequence of refusing to pay it." James Otis Jr. reasoned that the legal liberties of British subjects meant that Parliament should, or could, only tax the colonists if they were actually represented in Westminster.

At the time of the American Revolution, only England and Wales and Scotland were directly represented in the Parliament of Great Britain among the many parts of the British Empire. The colonial electorate perhaps consisted of 10% to 20% of the total population, or 75% of adult males. In Britain, by contrast, representation was highly limited due to unequally distributed voting constituencies and property requirements; only 3% of the population, or between 17% and 23% of males, could vote and they were often controlled by local gentry.

As virtual representation was founded on "a defect in the Constitution of England," namely, the "Want of a Full Representation of all the People of England," it was, therefore, a pernicious notion that had been fabricated for the sole purpose of arguing the colonists "out of their civil Rights." The colonists, and some Britons, consequently condemned the idea of virtual representation as "a sham". Moreover, the poor state of representation in Britain "was no excuse for taxing the colonists without their consent."

==== Daniel Dulany Jr. ====
In his influential 1765 pamphlet, Considerations on the Propriety of Imposing Taxes in the British Colonies, Daniel Dulany Jr. of Maryland likewise observed that attempting to tax subjects on the inequitable basis of "virtual" representation was unsound because,

The situation of the non-electors in England—their capacity to become electors — their inseparable connection with those who are electors, and their representatives—their security against oppression resulting from this connection, and the necessity of imagining a double or virtual representation, to avoid iniquity and absurdity, have been explained—the inhabitants of the colonies are, as such, incapable of being electors, the privilege of election being exerciseable only in person, and therefore if every inhabitant of America had the requisite freehold, not one could vote, but upon the supposition of his ceasing to be an inhabitant of America, and becoming a resident of Great-Britain, a supposition which would be impertinent, because it shifts the question—should the colonies not be taxed by parliamentary impositions, their respective legislatures have a regular, adequate, and constitutional authority to tax them, and, therefore, there would not necessarily be an iniquitous and absurd exemption, from their not being represented by the House of Commons. There is not that intimate and inseparable relation between the electors of Great-Britain, and the inhabitants of the colonies, which must inevitably involve both in the same taxation; on the contrary, not a single actual elector in England might be immediately affected by a taxation in America, imposed by a statute which would have a general operation and effect, upon the properties of the inhabitants of the colonies. The latter might be oppressed in a thousand shapes, without any sympathy, or exciting any alarm in the former. Moreover, even acts, oppressive and injurious to the colonies in an extreme degree, might become popular in England, from the promise or expectation, that the very measures which depressed the colonies, would give ease to the inhabitants of Great-Britain.

Dulany Jr. also wrote that, "the Impropriety of a Taxation by the British Parliament...[is proven by] the Fact, that not one inhabitant in any Colony is, or can be actually or virtually represented by the British House of Commons." Dulany Jr. denied that Parliament had a right "to impose an internal Tax upon the Colonies, without their consent for the single Purpose of Revenue."

==== James Otis Jr. ====
In 1764, the Massachusetts politician James Otis Jr. said that,

When the parliament shall think fit to allow the colonists a representation in the house of commons, the equity of their taxing the colonies, will be as clear as their power is at present of doing it without, if they please...But if it was thought hard that charter privileges should be taken away by act of parliament, is it not much harder to be in part, or in whole, disfranchised of rights, that have been always thought inherent to a British subject, namely, to be free from all taxes, but what he consents to in person, or by his representative? This right, if it could be traced no higher than Magna Charta, is part of the common law, part of a British subjects birthright, and as inherent and perpetual, as the duty of allegiance; both which have been brought to these colonies, and have been hitherto held sacred and inviolable, and I hope and trust ever will. It is humbly conceived, that the British colonists (except only the conquered, if any) are, by Magna Charta, as well entitled to have a voice in their taxes, as the subjects within the realm. Are we not as really deprived of that right, by the parliament assessing us before we are represented in the house of commons, as if the King should do it by his prerogative? Can it be said with any colour of truth or justice, that we are represented in parliament?

— James Otis, Rights of British Colonies Asserted

==== The Stamp Act Congress ====
In 1765 Otis Jr. attended the Continental Congress, otherwise known as the Stamp Act Congress, along with other colonial delegates. The resolutions of the Congress stated that the Stamp Act had "a manifest tendency to subvert the rights and liberties of the colonists" and that "the only Representatives of the People of these Colonies, are Persons chosen therein by themselves, and that no Taxes ever have been, or can be Constitutionally imposed on them, but by their respective Legislature." Furthermore, it was declared that, "it is unreasonable and inconsistent with the Principles and Spirit of the British Constitution, for the People of Great-Britain, to grant to his Majesty the Property of the Colonists."

==== Rationalist explanations ====
Sebastian Galiani and Gustavo Torrens propose that virtual representation imposed a dilemma on the British elite, which had a direct influence on the outbreak of the American Revolutionary War. They suggest the call for "No taxation without representation" and proposal of the inclusion of American representatives within Parliament, had they actually been implemented, would have encouraged coalition building between Americans and the British opposition (which was opposed to the dominant elite), disrupting the power of the incumbent landed gentry (who made up the elite). Through game theoretic models, Galiani and Torrens show that, once in Parliament, Americans could not feasibly commit to political alliances independent of the British opposition. As a result, mounting pressure for democratic reform would increase, posing a threat to the established British political order. Galiani and Torrens argue that British elites would incur greater losses to their domestic clout from American representation than from simply forfeiting a colony. The implications of forfeiting virtual representation forced the British elite, which dominated the government, to decide between maintaining the rule of the American colonies, which in their minds was infeasible, and engaging in war.

== 19th-century Britain ==
Cannon argues that for 18th- and 19th-century Britain "the doctrine of virtual representation was no more than a polite fiction. Indeed the assertion that there were no fundamental differences of interest between rich and poor is hard to reconcile with the determination of the upper classes to reserve political power for men of substance."

== See also ==
- Three-fifths Compromise, American agreement on how to represent and tax the slave states
