= Daniel Dulany the Younger =

American politician and lawyer

The Right Worshipful Daniel Dulany
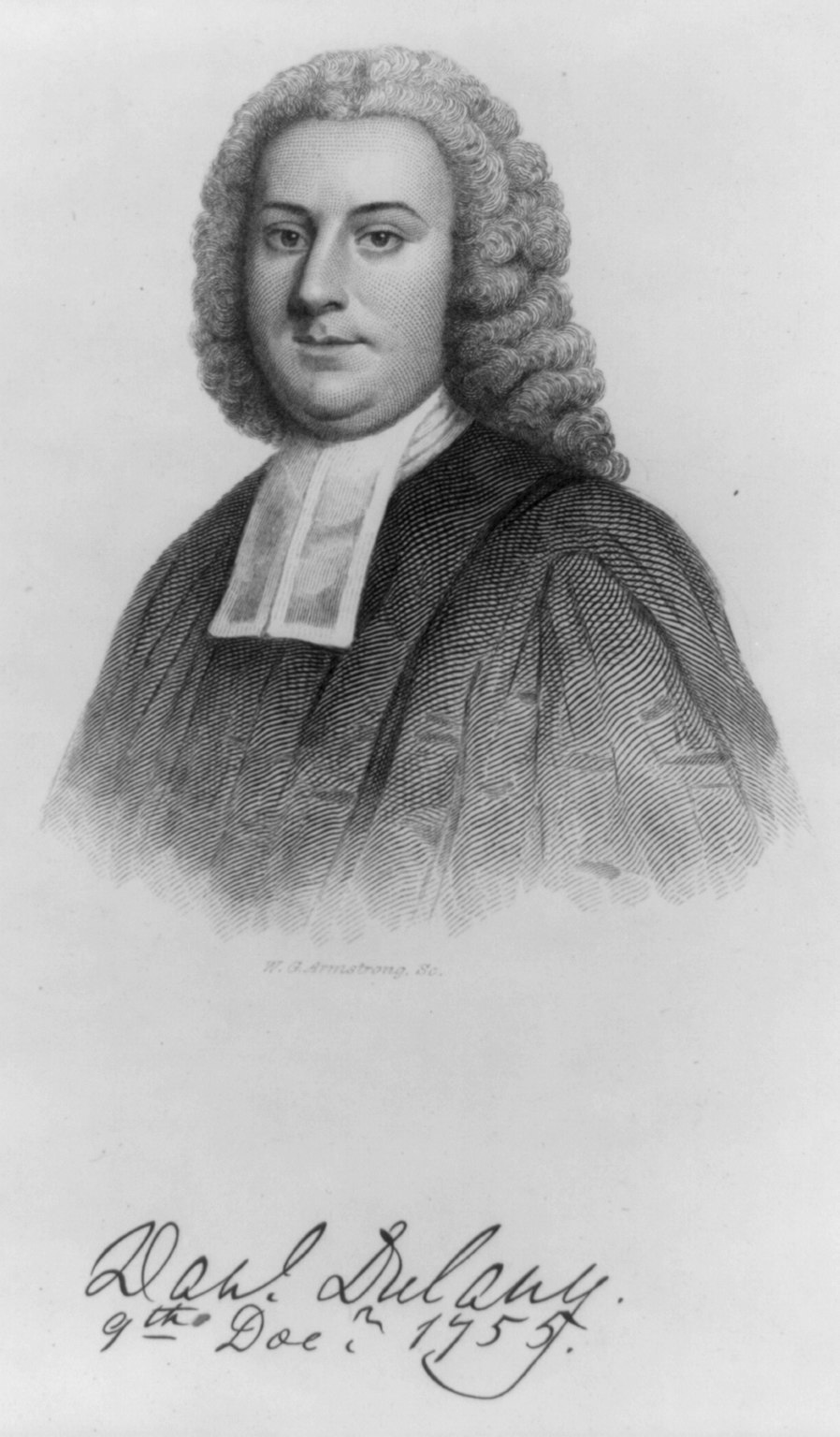

Lord Mayor of Annapolis
- In office 1764–1765
- Preceded by: George H. Steuart
- Succeeded by: John Ross

Member, Maryland Assembly
- In office 1751–1754

Member, Governor's Council
- In office 1757–1776

Personal details
- Born: 28 June 1722 Annapolis, Province of Maryland, British America
- Died: March 17, 1797 (aged 74) Baltimore, Maryland, United States
- Spouse: Rebecca Tasker (m. 1749)
- Parent: Daniel Dulany the Elder (father)
- Relatives: Walter Dulany (brother); Benjamin Tasker (father-in-law)
- Education: Clare College, Cambridge
- Occupation: lawyer, politician

Daniel Dulany the Younger (June 28, 1722 – March 17, 1797) was a Maryland Loyalist politician, Lord Mayor of Annapolis, and an influential American lawyer in the period immediately before the American Revolution. His pamphlet Considerations on the Propriety of Imposing Taxes in the British Colonies, which laid out the grievances associated with the taxation without representation argument, it has been described as "the ablest effort of this kind produced in America".

== Early life ==
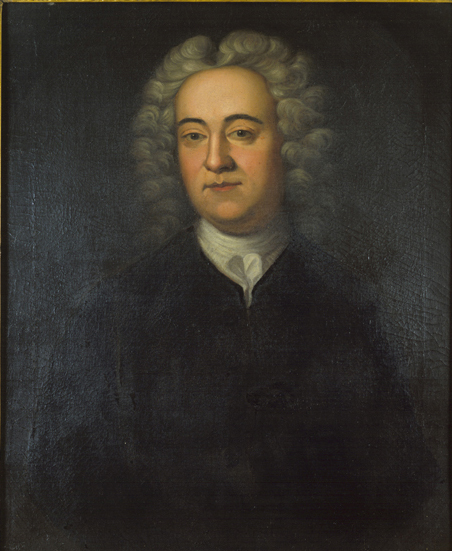
Dulany's father, Daniel Dulany the Elder was a wealthy Maryland lawyer and land developer.

Daniel Dulany was born on June 28, 1722, in Annapolis, Maryland, into a family steeped in law and politics. His father was the wealthy lawyer and public official Daniel Dulany the Elder (1685–1753). His brother Walter Dulany would also go on to be Lord Mayor of Annapolis.

=== Education ===
Like many sons of wealthy Maryland families, Dulany was sent to England to be educated, at Eton College and Clare College, Cambridge. In 1742 he enrolled to study law at Middle Temple, and was called to the English Bar before he returned to Maryland.

Dulany's skill as a lawyer was widely regarded, though as a result of his support for the Crown during the Revolution his reputation would not endure after the war. Fellow lawyer and politician William Pinkney regarded him as the peer of any lawyer in America or England, declaring that "even among such men as Fox, Pitt and Sheridan, he had not found his superior".

=== Marriage ===
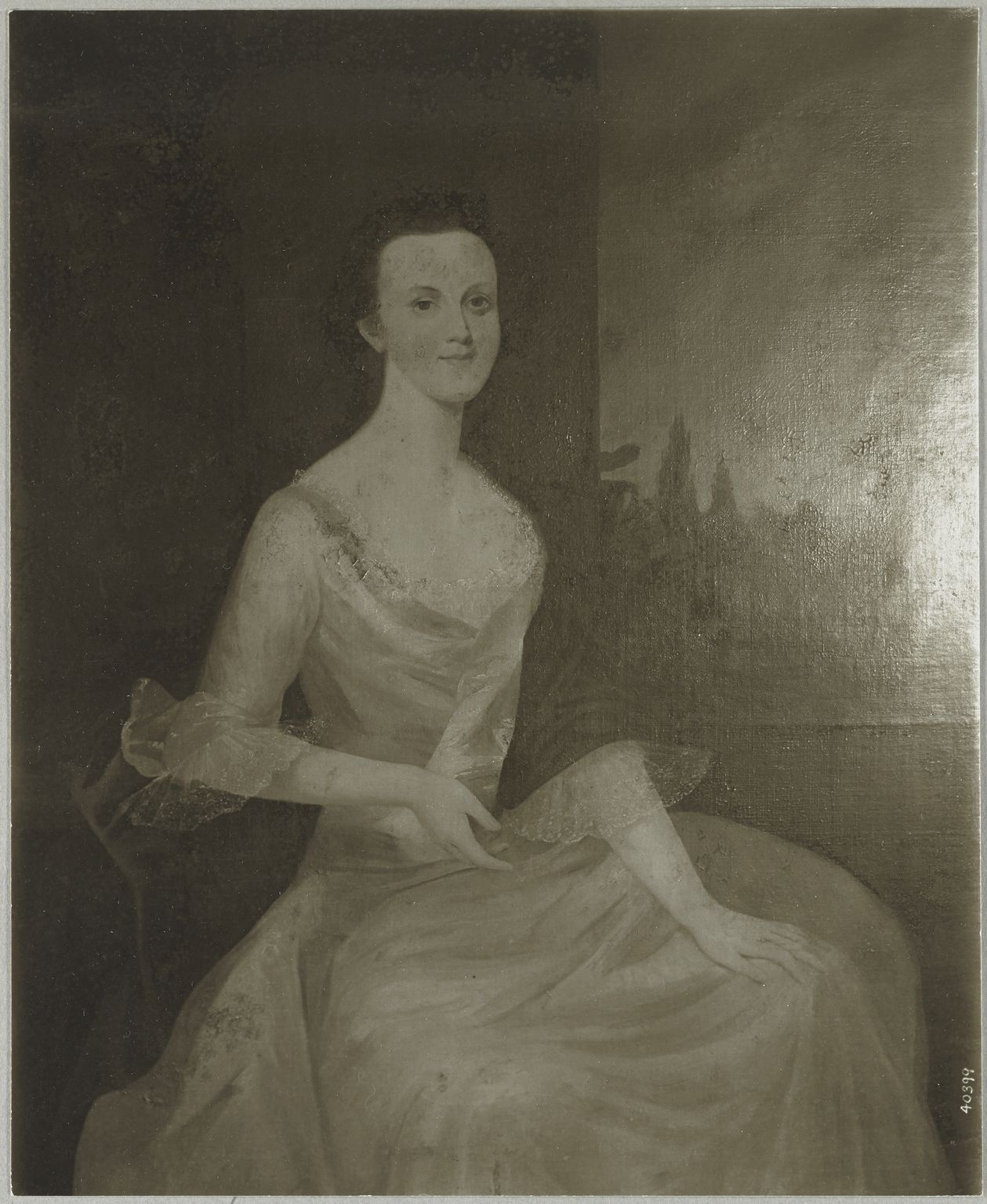
Dulany's wife, Rebecca Tasker Dulany, portrait by John Wollaston

In 1749 he married Rebecca Tasker, daughter of the powerful Benjamin Tasker (1690–1768), President of the Governor's Council, and Proprietary Governor of Maryland from 1752 to 1753. In 1750, the couple had a son, Daniel Dulany II, and in 1752, another son Benjamin Tasker Dulany. The couple would also have a daughter, Ann.

In 1753 his father died, and the younger Dulany inherited the family's extensive estates, thereby becoming wealthy in his own right.

== Politics ==
Coat of Arms of Daniel Dulaney, (the younger)

Dulany was a member of the Maryland legislative assembly from 1751 to 1754, he was appointed to the Governor's Council (1757–76) in recognition of his support for the colony's proprietary government. In 1751 Dulany was elected to the Maryland General Assembly to represent Frederick County. He served for three years. In 1764, Dulany became Lord Mayor of Annapolis.

Dulany labored on behalf of the Lower House in the Proprietary Government, and it was largely through his efforts that the Lower House eventually won its 40-year struggle to control the application of fines and fees by the Proprietary Government, earning him the resentment of Governor Horatio Sharpe.

== Coming of Revolution ==
Although Dulany would not go on to support the overthrow of British rule in Maryland, he was a noted opponent of the Stamp Act 1765, and wrote the noted pamphlet Considerations on the Propriety of Imposing Taxes in the British Colonies which argued against taxation without representation. The pamphlet has been described as "the ablest effort of this kind produced in America," and may have provided at least some of the material for the speech given by Pitt in Parliament the following year. In the pamphlet, Dulany summarized his position as follows: "There may be a time when redress may not be obtained. Till then, I shall recommend a legal, orderly, and prudent resentment." Soon after the publication of this pamphlet, he was made a member of the American Philosophical Society through his election in 1768.

From 1772 to 1775, Dulany deeded a majority of his substantial landholdings to his sons, with the exception of 3,000 acres.

=== Newspaper wars ===
Despite this open and articulate opposition to the Stamp Act, Dulany remained a loyalist, and in that vein engaged in a famous newspaper discussion with Charles Carroll of Carrollton. In these debates, both men adopted pseudonyms, Dulany being "Antillon," and Carroll "First Citizen". Charles Carroll, then relatively unknown, adopted the more populist argument, claiming that the government of Maryland had long been the monopoly of four families, the Ogles, the Taskers, the Bladens and the Dulanys. Dulany took the contrary view. Eventually word spread of the true identity of the two combatants, and Carroll's fame and notoriety began to grow. Eventually Dulany resorted to highly personal ad hominem attacks on "First Citizen," and Carroll responded, in statesmanlike fashion, with considerable restraint, arguing that when Antilles engaged in "virulent invective and illiberal abuse, we may fairly presume, that arguments are either wanting, or that ignorance or incapacity know not how to apply them".

Eventually, as war became inevitable, Dulany found his essentially moderate position untenable and he found himself forced to choose sides. Dulany was not able to rebel against the Crown he and his family had served so long. He believed that protest rather than force should furnish the solution to America's problems, and that legal process, logic, and the "prudent" exercise of "agreements" would eventually prevail upon the British to concede the colonists' demands.

== Post-Revolution ==
As a loyalist, a portion of Dulany's substantial property was confiscated in 1781.

He died March 17, 1797, in Baltimore. At the time of his death, he owned 3,000 acres of land in Frederick and Anne Arundel counties, and six slaves.

== See also ==
- Colonial families of Maryland
- List of mayors of Annapolis, Maryland

== Sources ==
- Andrews, Matthew Page, History of Maryland, Doubleday, New York (1929)
- Land, Aubrey C. The Dulanys of Maryland: A Biographical Study of Daniel Dulany, the Elder (1685–1753), and Daniel Dulany, the Younger (1722–1797). Baltimore, Maryland Historical Society: 1955.
