= 2025 Annapolis mayoral election =

Local election in Maryland, US

- November 4, 2025
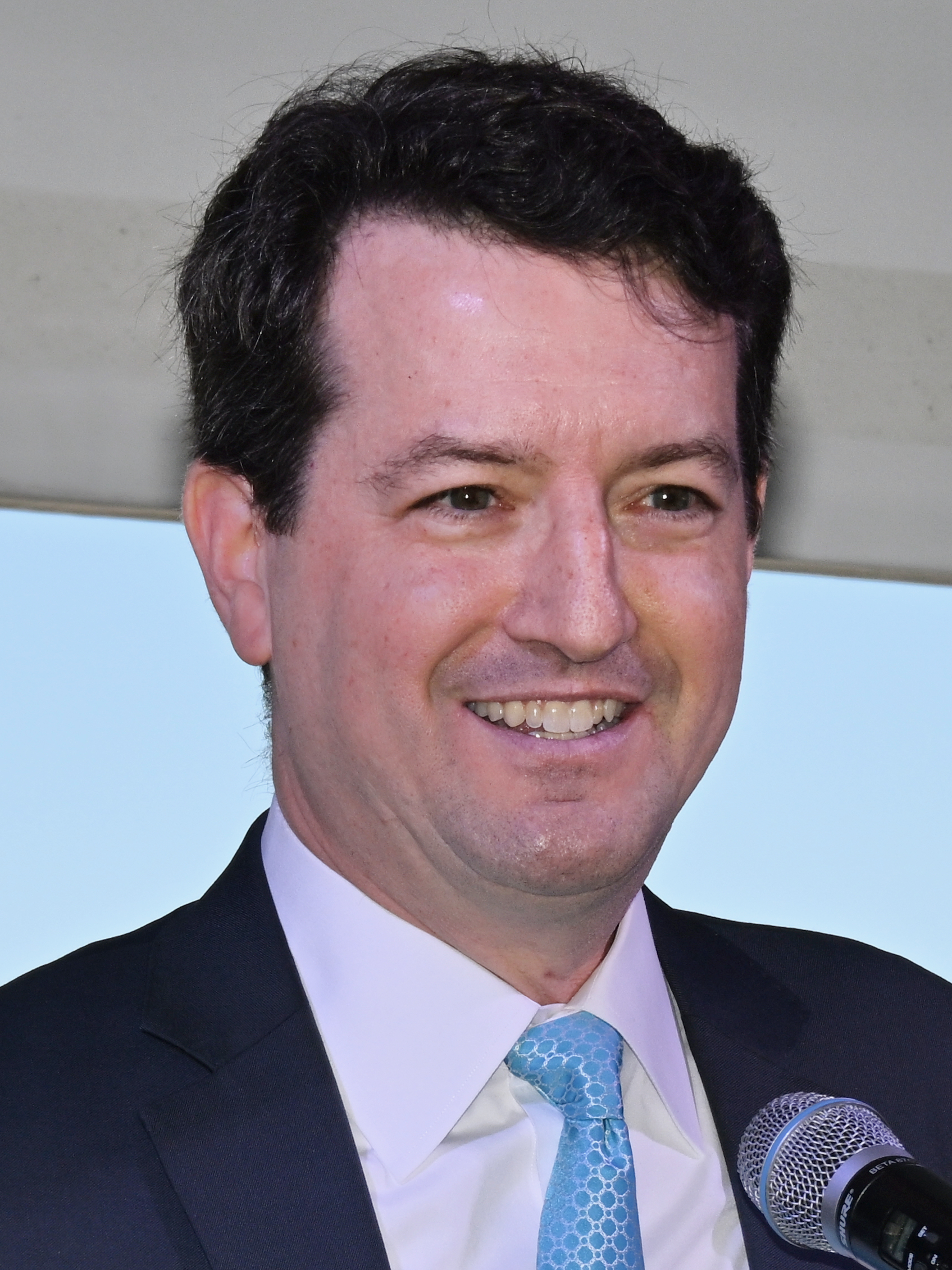

| Nominee | Jared Littmann | Bob O'Shea |
| Party | Democratic | Republican |
| Popular vote | 6,792 | 2,441 |
| Percentage | 73.3% | 26.4% |
Mayor before election
Gavin Buckley
Democratic
Elected mayor
Jared Littmann
Democratic

The 2025 Annapolis mayoral election was held on November 4, 2025, to elect the mayor of Annapolis, Maryland. Incumbent Democratic mayor Gavin Buckley, who was re-elected to a second term with 72.7 percent of the vote in 2021, was ineligible to run for re-election to a third term due to term limits. Former alder Jared Littmann won the Democratic primary election on September 16, 2025, and defeated Republican nominee Bob O'Shea in the general election.

== Democratic primary ==
=== Candidates ===
==== Nominee ====
- Jared Littmann, former alder from Ward 5 (2013–2017)

==== Eliminated in primary ====
- Rhonda Pindell-Charles, alder from Ward 3 (2013–present)

==== Declined ====
- Elly Tierney, former alder from Ward 1 (2017–2024) (endorsed Littmann)

=== Endorsements ===
Jared Littmann

Statewide officials

- Parris Glendening, former governor of Maryland (1995–2003)
- Brooke Lierman, comptroller of Maryland (2023–present)

State legislators

- John Astle, former state senator from the 30th district (1995–2019) and candidate for mayor in 2017
- Dylan Behler, state delegate from district 30A (2025–present)
- Shaneka Henson, state senator from the 30th district (2025–present)
- Dana Jones, state delegate from district 30A (2020–present)

County officials

- Steuart Pittman, Anne Arundel County executive (2018–present)

Local officials

- Ross Arnett, alder from Ward 8 (2007–present)
- Ellen Moyer, former mayor (2001–2009)
- Karma O'Neill, alder from Ward 2 (2021–present)
- Rob Savidge, alder from Ward 7 (2017–present)
- Elly Tierney, former alder from Ward 1 (2017–2024)

Labor unions

- International Association of Fire Fighters Local 1926

Organizations

- Sierra Club Maryland
Rhonda Pindell-Charles

County officials

- Anne Colt Leitess, Anne Arundel County state's attorney (2013–2015, 2019–present)
- Scott Poyer, clerk of the Anne Arundel County Circuit Court (2018–present)
Declined to endorse

Local officials

- Gavin Buckley, incumbent mayor (2017–present)

=== Results ===
Democratic primary results
| Party | Candidate | Votes | % |
|---|---|---|---|
| Democratic | Jared Littmann | 2,594 | 67.1 |
| Democratic | Rhonda Pindell-Charles | 1,271 | 32.9 |
| Total votes | | 3,865 | 100.0 |

== Republican primary ==
=== Candidates ===
==== Nominee ====
- Bob O'Shea, businessman, nominee for HD-30A in 2018, and candidate for mayor in 2013

==== Declined ====
- Mike Pantelides, former mayor (2013–2017)

=== Results ===
Republican primary results
| Party | Candidate | Votes | % |
|---|---|---|---|
| Republican | Bob O'Shea | Unopposed | |
| Total votes | | —N/a | 100.0 |

== General election ==
=== Post-primary endorsements ===
Jared Littmann (D)

Statewide officials

- Wes Moore, governor of Maryland (2023–present)
Bob O'Shea (R)

Statewide officials

- Bob Ehrlich, former governor of Maryland (2003–2007)

=== Results ===
Annapolis mayoral election results, 2025
| Party | Candidate | Votes | % | ±% |
|---|---|---|---|---|
| Democratic | Jared Littmann | 6,792 | 73.32% | +0.66% |
| Republican | Bob O'Shea | 2,441 | 26.35% | +0.14% |
| Write-in | | 30 | 0.32% | -0.81% |
| Total votes | | 9,263 | 100.0% | N/A |
| n/a | Overvotes | 3 | 0.03% | −0.01% |
| n/a | Undervotes | 56 | 0.60% | −0.60% |
