= Benjamin Tasker =

Benjamin Tasker may refer to:

- Benjamin Tasker Sr. (1690–1768), Provincial Governor of Maryland (1752–1753)
- Benjamin Tasker Jr. (1720–1760), Maryland politician, delegate to the Albany Congress, racehorse owner

== See also ==
- Tasker
