= Tasker =

Tasker is a surname and occasionally a given name. Notable people with the name include:

== Surname ==
=== People ===
- Alfred Tasker (born 1934), English cricketer
- Benjamin Tasker, Sr. (1690–1768), Provincial Governor of Maryland
- Benjamin Tasker, Jr. (1720–1760), Maryland politician, delegate to the Albany Congress, racehorse owner
- Caleb Tasker (born 1996), Australian Music Producer
- Charlie Tasker (born 2006), English footballer
- Bruce Tasker (born 1987), British bobsleigher and track athlete
- Elizabeth Tasker, Australian fire ecologist
- Elizabeth J. Tasker (born 1980), British astrophysicist
- Glenn Tasker, Australian sports administrator
- Homer G. Tasker (1899–1990), American sound engineer
- Jill Tasker (born 1964), American actress
- Joe Tasker (1948–1982), British climber
- John Tasker (disambiguation), multiple people, including:
- J. Wilder Tasker (1887–1974), American collegiate football, basketball, and baseball coach
- Leo Tasker (1900–1948), Australian rules footballer
- Luke Tasker (born 1991), American wide receiver
- Marianne Allen Tasker (1852–1911), New Zealand domestic servant
- Martin Tasker (born 1951), British/New Zealand journalist
- Nathan Tasker, Australian Christian pop artist
- Paul Tasker, English engineer
- Peter Tasker, Australian Anglican bishop
- Ralph Tasker (1919–1999), American high-school basketball coach
- Robert Tasker (1868–1959) British architect and politician
- Robert Joyce Tasker (1903–1944), American criminal, author, and screenwriter
- Rolly Tasker (1926–2012), Australian sailor
- Roly Tasker (1907–1972), Australian rules footballer
- Sean Tasker (born 1968), Australian rules footballer
- Steve Tasker (born 1962), American football player and sports broadcaster
- William Tasker (1891–1918), Australian rugby player and World War I soldier
- William Tasker (poet) (1740–1800), English clergyman, scholar and poet

=== Fictional characters ===
- Harry Tasker, protagonist of the action-comedy film True Lies
- Marissa Tasker, in the soap opera All My Children

== Given name ==
- Tasker H. Bliss (1853–1930), United States Army general, Army Chief of Staff, and diplomat
- Tasker Cook (1867–1937), politician in the Dominion of Newfoundland
- Tasker Oddie (1870–1950), American politician
- Tasker Watkins (1918–2007), Welsh Lord Justice of Appeal and deputy Lord Chief Justice

== See also ==
- Kemp & Tasker, British architectural firm of the 1930s
- Taskers of Andover, manufacturer of steam traction engines
- Task (disambiguation)
