= 2021 Annapolis mayoral election =

Annapolis Mayoral Election, 2021
- November 2, 2021
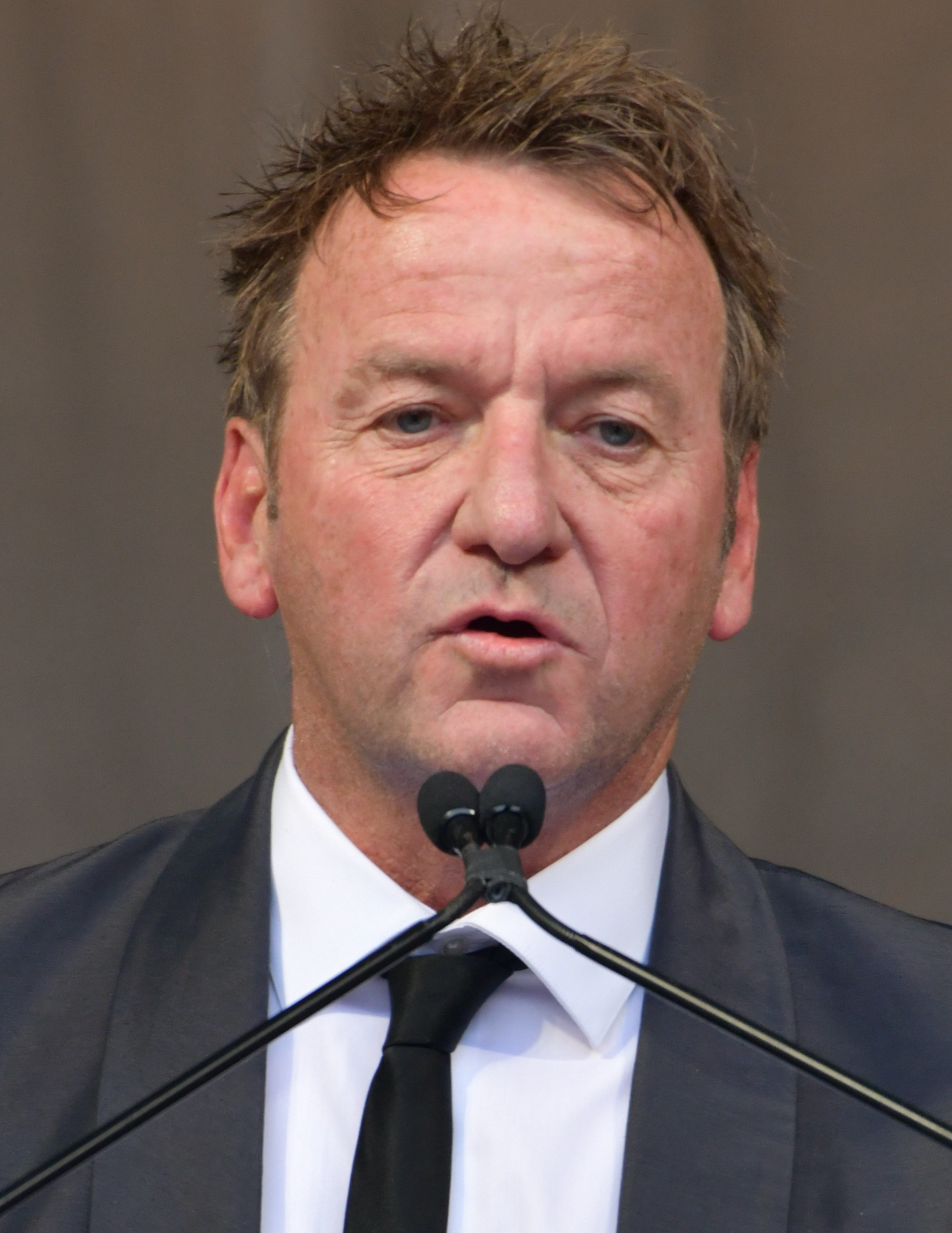

Nominee	Gavin Buckley	Steven Strawn
Party	Democratic	Republican
Popular vote	7,124	2,570
Percentage	72.66%	26.21%
Mayor before election
Gavin Buckley
Democratic
Elected mayor
Gavin Buckley
Democratic

The 2021 Annapolis mayoral election was held on November 2, 2021, to elect the mayor of Annapolis, Maryland. Incumbent Democratic mayor Gavin Buckley was re-elected to a second term.

== Candidates ==
- Gavin Buckley, incumbent mayor (Democratic)
- Steven Strawn, chair of the Annapolis Republican Committee (Republican)

== Results ==
Annapolis mayoral election, 2021
Party	Candidate	Votes	%
Democratic	Gavin Buckley (incumbent)	7,124	72.66%
Republican	Steven Strawn	2,570	26.21%
Write-In	Personal choice	111	1.11%
Total votes		9,805	100.00%
