= John Brice =

John Brice may refer to:

- John Brice Jr. (1705–1766), early American settler and Loyalist politician in colonial Maryland
- John Brice III (1738–1820), American lawyer, businessman, and political leader from Maryland
- John Brice (MP), British politician, former Member of Parliament for Melcombe Regis (UK Parliament constituency)
- John J. Brice (1842–1912), United States Navy officer, U.S. Commissioner of Fish and Fisheries (1896–1898)
