= Yahad Ostracon =

The Yahad Ostracon is a controversial ostracon (text-bearing potsherd) that was found at the ruins of Qumran in 1996. The editors who published the text claimed that it contained the Hebrew word yahad (יחד yāḥaḏ). This word is also used in a number of the Dead Sea Scrolls, where it has usually been translated as "community", and is generally taken to be a self-reference to the group responsible for the scrolls in which it appears (and, by extension, the corpus as a whole). The presence of this unusual term in both the scrolls (found in the nearby caves) and on the ostracon (found at the ruins themselves) would connect the scrolls to the settlement at Qumran.

== Ostracon ==
James F. Strange of the University of South Florida led an excavation which examined an area just outside the eastern wall of the settlement. One of the volunteers came upon the piece of ceramic and immediately lifted it out of its context to notice that there was writing on the other side. Strange had been removing dump material from a previous excavation with the aim to reach virgin soil, so the ostracon was found close to the original soil level. Further examination revealed a second piece. The ostracon yielded eighteen lines of text, though much of the latter part is extremely fragmentary.

In 1997 Frank Moore Cross and Esti Eshel published the text with drawing, transcription and translation. "According to the editors' interpretation, a certain man named Ḥoni gave his slave Ḥisday, his home, fig and olive trees to Eleazar, the treasurer or bursar of the Qumran community." This was a dramatic link between the site of Qumran and the scrolls themselves, which talk about this community, usually referred to as the Yahad. As Cross and Eshel put it, "The word Yahad, which appears on this ostracon, establishes the connection between Khirbet Qumran and the scrolls which were found in the nearby caves."

== Line 8 and yahad ==
Cross and Eshel translated line 8 thus: "when he fulfills (his oath) to the Community (יחד, ie yahad)". "If the reading lyḥd is correct – and it seems without serious objection (the dalet at the edge of the ostracon is certain) – we must suppose that the reference is to Honi's fulfilling his vow and entering the Community at Qumran, or to his fulfilment of his year as a neophyte, after which he assigns all of his estate to the community."

The publication immediately provoked controversy because not only did the transcription include the word yahad, but most who looked at photos of the original artifact could not see the letters that Cross and Eshel saw that should make up the word. This provoked various scholarly published responses. Yardeni translated the line "and every oth[er(?)] tree", the word "other" (אחר ’aḥêr) being placed last in Hebrew word order and instead of Cross and Eshel's certain dalet (ד) Yardeni posited a resh (ר), which is similar in form. More problematic is the first letter which Yardeni reads as an alef (א). Golb published a brief comment advocating that the first two letters appear to be a gimel (ג) or nun (נ) and an alef (rather than a rare form of het, ח), while it was a moot point whether the third letter was "the upper miniscule [sic] portion of a daleth". F.H. Cryer also published a differing opinion on the ostracon. Most scholars agree that the text was a deed and the majority of those accept that it was a deed of gift. Few see any reference to the Yahad.

In 2000 Cross and Eshel published the ostracon in volume 36 of the Discoveries in the Judaean Desert (DJD) series with the yahad reading intact, despite the scholarly disapproval which had been aired since the initial publication in 1997.
