= 2017 Annapolis mayoral election =

Annapolis Mayoral Election, 2017
- November 7, 2017
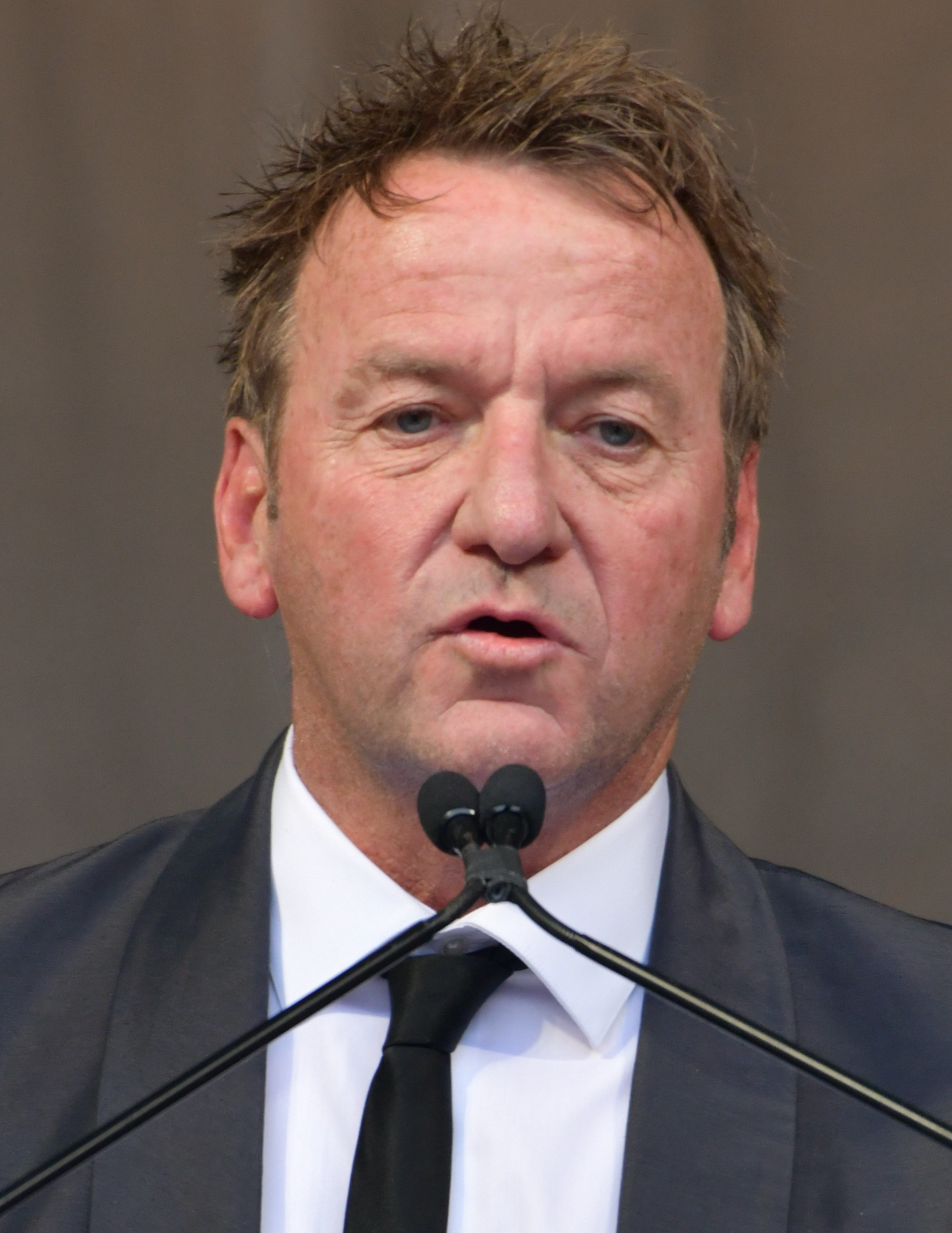

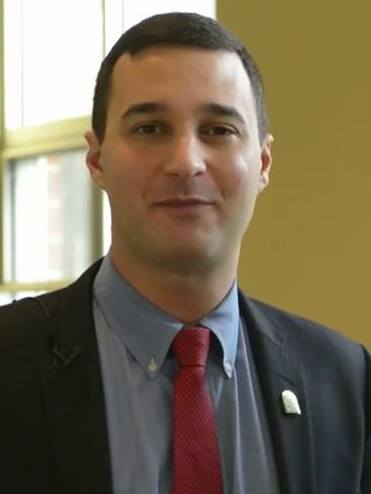
Nominee	Gavin Buckley	Mike Pantelides
Party	Democratic	Republican
Popular vote	5,787	3,671
Percentage	61.06%	38.73%
Mayor before election
Mike Pantelides
Republican
Elected mayor
Gavin Buckley
Democratic

The 2017 Annapolis mayoral election was held on November 7, 2017, to elect the mayor of Annapolis, Maryland. Mike Pantelides, the incumbent mayor, ran for a second term as mayor. Democratic nominee Gavin Buckley won the election with 61.06% of the vote, becoming the city's next mayor.

== Results ==
Annapolis mayoral election, 2017
Party	Candidate	Votes	%
Democratic	Gavin Buckley	5,787	61.06%
Republican	Mike Pantelides (incumbent)	3,671	38.73%
Write-In	Personal choice	20	0.21%
Total votes		9,478	100.00%
