= Senator Strange =

Senator Strange may refer to:

== Members of the United States Senate ==
- Luther Strange (born 1953), U.S. Senator from Alabama from 2017 to 2018
- Robert Strange (American politician) (1796–1854), U.S. senator from North Carolina from 1836 to 1840

== United States state senate members ==
- James F. Strange (1872–1926), Maryland State Senate
