= Roger Moyer =

American politician

Mayor of Annapolis, Maryland
- In office 1965–1973
- Preceded by: Joseph Griscom, Sr.
- Succeeded by: Noah Hillman

Alderman, Annapolis City Council
- In office 1961–1965

Personal details
- Born: Roger W. Moyer; August 16, 1934 Eastport, Annapolis, Maryland
- Died: January 10, 2015 (aged 80) Eastport, Annapolis, Maryland
- Party: Democratic
- Spouse: Ellen Moyer (div. 1973)
- Children: Five children; five grandchildren

Military service
- Branch/service: United States Army

Roger W. "Pip" Moyer (August 16, 1934 – January 10, 2015) was an American politician who served as the Mayor of Annapolis, Maryland, from 1965 to 1973 for two consecutive terms. Moyer is credited with calming race relations in Annapolis following the assassination of Martin Luther King Jr. in 1968 by working alongside the city's community leaders, notably his friend, Joseph "Zastrow" Simms, and George Phelps, Jr. (1926–2015). He is also credited with rescuing the city's economy and reviving Main Street during his tenure as mayor.

== Biography ==
=== Early life ===
Moyer was born on August 16, 1934, to Clara Lewis, who was from the Eastport neighborhood of Annapolis, and Vernon Moyer, who was from Iowa. His mother believed in racial equality, which she instilled in her son, according to Moyer's relatives and friends. Roger Moyer earned the nickname, "Pipsqueak," by playing baseball with older children. He would later shorten his nickname simply to "Pip." During the 1940s, Moyer began a lifelong friendship with Joseph "Zastrow" Simms, who would become a leading Annapolis community activist.

He became a standout basketball player at Annapolis High School. Moyer then enrolled at the University of Baltimore, where he played for the college's Baltimore Bees basketball team. Moyer enlisted in the U.S. Army after studying at the University of Baltimore. He was a member of the Fort Dix basketball team which won the 1958 Army Championship. In 1993, Moyer became the first basketball player to be inducted into the Anne Arundel County Sports Hall of Fame for his achievements at Annapolis H.S.

=== Career ===
Moyer was first elected to the Annapolis City Council in 1961. He was elected Mayor of Annapolis in 1965 and won re-election to a second term in 1969.

Moyer and Zastrow Simms were the subject of a 2008 documentary, Pip & Zastrow: An American Friendship, which was co-directed and co-produced by Victoria Bruce. Zastrow Simms died on April 15, 2013, at the age of 78.

Roger Moyer remained active in Annapolis city government after leaving the mayor's office in 1973, following two terms. He served as the Deputy Director of the Annapolis Housing Authority for many years. He remained an adviser to the city's elected officials during his retirement.

Outside politics Moyer was a longtime basketball coach at St. Mary's High School in Annapolis. The city's Pip Moyer Recreation Center is named in his honor.

Roger Moyer died in his sleep at his home at the age of 80 on January 10, 2015, following a lengthy illness with Parkinson's disease. He was survived by his ex-wife, former Annapolis Mayor Ellen Moyer, and their five children - Guy William, John Rodger, Michael Vernon, Steven Lewis and Loni Ellen. Mayor Mike Pantelides ordered flags to be lowered to half staff in his honor.
