= James Strange (disambiguation) =

James Strange may be:

- James Charles Stuart Strange (1753-1840), British Member of Parliament
- James French Strange, (1872-1926), Maryland politician
- James Smith-Stanley, Lord Strange (1716-1771), British Member of Parliament
