= Michael MacNamara =

Mayor of Annapolis, Maryland (died 1767)

Lord Mayor of Annapolis
- In office 1746–1747
- Preceded by: Robert Gordon
- Succeeded by: Benjamin Tasker, Sr.
- In office 1753–1754
- Preceded by: Benjamin Tasker, Sr.
- Succeeded by: Benjamin Tasker, Jr.
- In office 1760–1761
- Preceded by: George Hume Steuart
- Succeeded by: Stephen Bordley

Personal details
- Born: Annapolis, Province of Maryland
- Died: November 4, 1767 Annapolis, Province of Maryland
- Occupation: Plantation owner, politician

Michael MacNamara (died November 4, 1767) was an Irish-American lawyer and politician in Colonial Maryland, who had three terms as Lord Mayor of Annapolis. He was a Loyalist, his interests aligned with those of the ruling Calvert family, the Barons Baltimore, whose rule was overthrown following the American Revolution.

== Biography ==
MacNamara was born in Annapolis, province of Maryland, the son of Thomas MacNamara, who emigrated from County Galway, Kingdom of Ireland. His mother was born Margaret Carroll.

A clerk and a lawyer, MacNamara was admitted to the Provincial Court of Maryland in May 1726. He held a number of Proprietary appointments in colonial Maryland. He was clerk of the Maryland Lower House of Assembly on three occasions (1728–44, 1746–60, and 1763–66). He was also clerk of the Paper Currency Office (1734–c. 39) and clerk of the Prerogative Office (1752–60). He was Mayor of Annapolis on three occasions, from 1746 to 1747, 1753–1754, and 1760–1761.

Politically, was a Loyalist. Maryland politics could evidently be rancorous. Court records show that MacNamara and his predecessor as Annapolis mayor, the physician George Steuart (1700–1784), were both required "to post a bond to keep the peace...especially with each other".

Contemporary records show that in 1754, MacNamara was the Deputy Commissioner of Anne Arundel County, hearing a claim by Henrietta Maria Dulany seeking to overturn the will of her late husband, the planter and politician Daniel Dulany the Elder (1685–1753).

MacNamara's loyalty to England and the Calverts was not repaid. He died in debtors' prison in 1767, owing His Lordship's Patronage.

== Coming of revolution ==
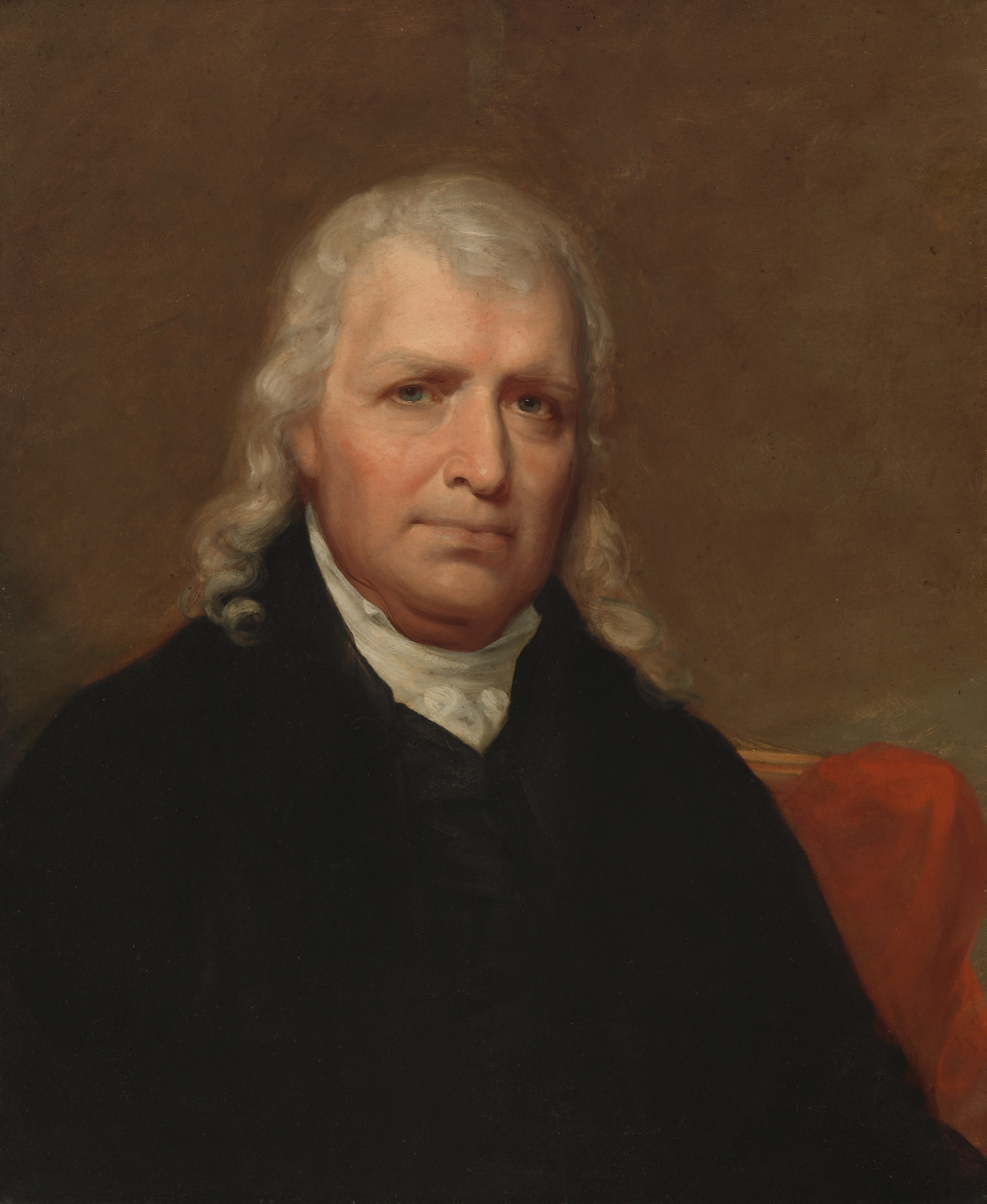
Samuel Chase, signer of the Declaration of Independence and MacNamara's implacable opponent.

In 1766, MacNamara became embroiled in a war of words Samuel Chase, a vocal opponent of the Stamp Act and later a signer of the American Declaration of Independence. In an open letter dated July 18, 1766, Chase attacked MacNamara, John Brice, Walter Dulany, George Steuart, and others for publishing an article in the Maryland Gazette Extraordinary of June 19, 1766, in which Chase had been accused of being: "a busy, reckless incendiary, a ringleader of mobs, a foul-mouthed and inflaming son of discord and faction, a common disturber of the public tranquility".

In his response, Chase accused MacNamara and the others of "vanity...pride and arrogance", and of being brought to power by "proprietary influence, court favour, and the wealth and influence of the tools and favourites who infest this city."

In particular Chase accused MacNamara, in highly personal terms, of having been "reduced to a servile dependency" by "the consequences of a bad life", and accused him of having allowed his children to be "reduced to beggary by your continued round of vice and folly, drunkenness and debauchery".

== See also ==
- Colonial government in the Thirteen Colonies
- List of mayors of Annapolis, Maryland

Preceded by Robert Gordon	Mayor of Annapolis; 1746–1747	Succeeded by Benjamin Tasker, Sr.
Preceded by Bejamin Tasker	Mayor of Annapolis; 1753–1754	Succeeded by Benjamin Tasker, Jr.
Preceded by George H. Steuart	Mayor of Annapolis; 1760–1761	Succeeded by Stephen Bordley
