= James Brice =

American politician (1746-1801)

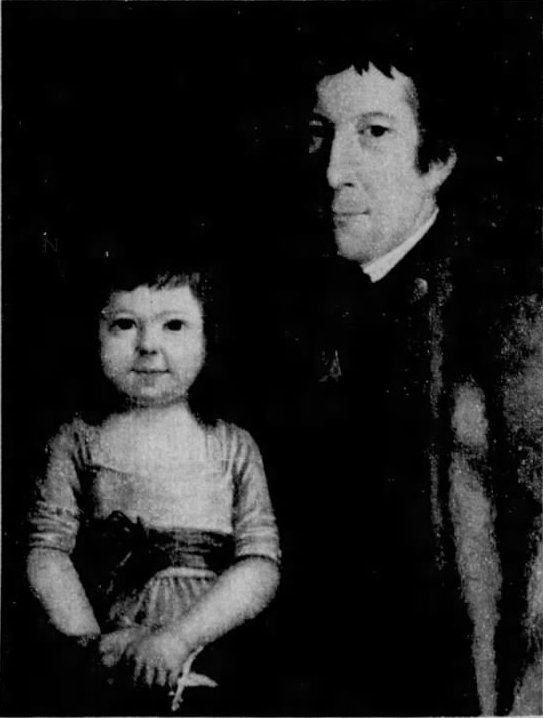
- Portrait by Charles Willson Peale, 1788

Governor of Maryland
- In office February 10, 1792 – April 5, 1792
- Preceded by: George Plater
- Succeeded by: Thomas S. Lee

Mayor of Annapolis
- In office 1787–1788
- Preceded by: Allen Quynn
- Succeeded by: John Bullen

Lord Mayor of Annapolis
- In office 1782–1783
- Preceded by: John Bullen
- Succeeded by: Jeremiah Chase

Personal details
- Born: August 26, 1746 Annapolis, Province of Maryland, British America
- Died: July 11, 1801 (aged 54) Annapolis, Maryland, U.S.

Coat of Arms of James Brice

James Brice (August 26, 1746 – July 11, 1801) was an American planter, lawyer, and politician from Annapolis, Maryland. He was Governor of Maryland in 1792, and one of the largest land owners on the east coast.

James was born in Annapolis and was the son of John Brice, Jr. and Sarah Frisby Brice. He practiced law in Annapolis and married Juliana Jennings in 1781. The couple would have five children: Julia, Anne, Elizabeth, James, Thomas, John.

Brice began his political career as tax commissioner for the county and as an alderman in Annapolis. In 1777 he became a member of the Maryland Governor's Council, a post he held until 1799. As the senior member of the council, Brice became acting governor when Governor George Plater died on February 10, 1792. He stepped down after Thomas Sim Lee was elected and sworn in on April 2.

Brice also served as Mayor of Annapolis in 1782-1783 and again in 1787-1788. He represented Maryland as a Presidential Elector twice, both times voting for George Washington. He served as treasurer for the city of Annapolis from 1784 until his death.

James died in Annapolis. After his death, his wife Juliana and all five children left and settled in Topping, Virginia. The last known family members are Judge James Brice and Jimmy Brice of Roanoke, Virginia. Jimmy Brice's son James Brice III is the last male in the Brice family residing in Virginia Beach, Virginia.

Political offices
| Preceded by John Bullen | Lord Mayor of Annapolis; 1782–1783 | Succeeded by Jeremiah Townly Chase |
| Preceded by Allen Quynn | Mayor of Annapolis; 1787–1788 | Succeeded by John Bullen |
| Preceded by George Plater; Governor | Acting Governor of Maryland; 1792 | Succeeded by Thomas Sim Lee; Governor |
