= John Tasker =

John Tasker may refer to:

- John Tasker (sea captain) (1742–1800)
- John Tasker (architect) (1738–1818)
- John Tasker (cricketer) (1887–1975), British cricketer
- John Tasker (theatre director) (c. 1933 – 1988), Australian theatre director
- John Tasker (1659–1730/31), son-in-law of Thomas Brooke Jr.
- John Tasker (jockey) (died 1855), rode in 1850 Grand National
