= George Carter I =

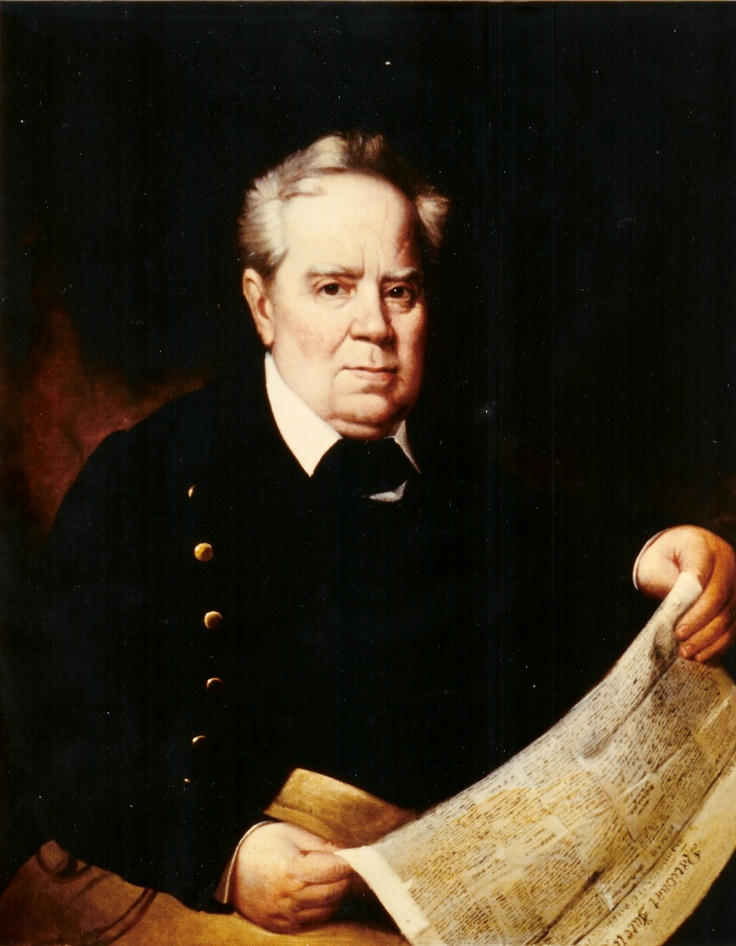
- Born: 1777
- Died: 1846 (aged 68–69)
- Education: College in the English Colony of Rhode Island and Providence Plantations (now Brown University)
- Occupation: Planter
- Known for: Builder of Oatlands Plantation
- Spouse: Elizabeth Osborne Carter

George Carter I (1777–1846), son of Robert "Councillor" Carter the III and Frances Ann Tasker Carter was an American plantation owner most famous for building Oatlands Plantation, an estate located in Leesburg, Virginia. Although he unsuccessfully opposed his father's emancipation of slaves in the early 19th century, Carter owned slaves and became one of the wealthiest individuals in Virginia's Loudoun County.

== Early life ==
George's father Robert Carter III was a major planter and politician in colonial Virginia, famous both for his vast property interests as well as for serving on the Virginia Governor's Council, then supporting the patriot cause during the American Revolutionary War. Following the conflict, he became notorious within his class as an outspoken critic of slavery as well as for his phased manumission of 452 slaves during his lifetime. Meanwhile, rather than send George to his own alma mater, William & Mary, Robert sent George to the College in the English Colony of Rhode Island and Providence Plantations (now Brown University), writing to its president James Manning that his sole motivation for doing so was Virginia's devotion to slavery, and that "On this consideration only, I do not intend that these two sons shall return to this State till each of them arrive at the age of 21 years."

After six years in Rhode Island, George began studying law at the University of Pennsylvania, also in a state trying to phase out slavery. However, he left shortly thereafter, returning to Virginia in 1798 at the age of 21 to take up management of the 3400 acres of land his father owned in Loudoun County.

== Building Oatlands Plantation ==
George began constructing Oatlands Plantation in 1804, and would continue to build on this estate throughout his life. George's father Robert, who also died in 1804, had begun emancipating slaves in 1791, a process which proved to be a long and drawn out legal affair, overseen by an executor, as well opposed by Robert's neighbors and family. In 1805, George Carter filed suit in an attempt to stop the remaining emancipations of Carter slaves, but the Virginia Court of Appeals ruled against George in 1808. George needed slaves for his work at Oatlands and thus set about buying more to replace those being emancipated. Census records indicate that in 1800, Oatlands had 10 slaves, and by 1860, 128 slaves.

== Personal life ==
George did not marry until 1835, at age 58, when he wed Elizabeth Osborne Carter, widow of Joseph Lewis Jr. George had earlier suggested in an 1816 letter that in one of his "vicious and corrupt" habits he had "been too open, and not used dissumulation enough, and have rendered myself liable to be animadverted upon - but in this I comfort myself in knowing that I have no mulatto children."

== See also ==
- Robert Carter III
- History of slavery in the United States
