= John Thomas Chambers Jr. =

American politician (1928–2011)

Mayor of Annapolis
- In office April 12, 1981 – June 7, 1981
- Preceded by: Gustav Akerland
- Succeeded by: Richard Lazer Hillman

Personal details
- Born: February 29, 1928
- Died: February 25, 2011 (aged 82)
- Party: Republican
- Spouse: Hannah Jane Scott (1954-2011)
- Children: John III, Ursula
- Parents: John T Chambers Sr. (father); Ruth Hicks (mother)

John Thomas Chambers Jr. (February 29, 1928 – February 25, 2011) was an American politician from Maryland. Chambers served on the Annapolis, Maryland City Council for fourteen years. In 1981, the city council named Chambers mayor of Annapolis and he became the first and only African American to serve as mayor of Annapolis

== Life ==
John Thomas Chambers Jr. was born on February 29, 1928, he was the son of Rev. John T. Chambers Jr. and Ruth Hicks (October 25, 1908 - September 13, 1996). He had two brothers, Philip (August 4, 1925 - February 24, 2008) and Carol, and one sister, Gertrude (February 28, 1930 - October 19, 2019). In 1930, John Chambers, Jr., was living in Camp Parole with his parents and siblings. They resided with a large extended family that included Chambers' grandfather, James Hicks, and several aunts, uncles, and cousins. At that time, John Chambers, Sr., was working as a barber, a trade that he practiced for fifty-one years and taught to his children. He graduated from Wiley H. Bates Senior High School in 1945, and then from the Hampton Institute in Virginia.

John married Hannah Jane Scott (October 13, 1932 - June 4, 2016) on February 12, 1954, they had 2 children together; John Chambers III and Ursula. A year after their marriage, John and Hannah Chambers purchased a house on Hicks Avenue. The street was named after his grandfather.

In April 1981, the City Council appointed Alderman Chambers as acting mayor, following the death of Gustav J. Akerland. Akerland had served as acting mayor since March 9, following the resignation of Mayor John C. Apostol. Chambers's appointment made him the first African American mayor of Annapolis. However, he informed the Afro-American that he still planned to retire in June, rather than run for mayor in the election that month: "I hope to get the budget prepared for the incoming mayor. That's the main thing along with the other duties." On June 8, 1981, the City Council's records noted that "Mayor-Elect Richard L. Hillman presented outgoing Mayor Chambers with an engraved gavel as a token of appreciation for his years of service to the city."On November 13, 1981, the Anne Arundel County Branch of the NAACP awarded Chambers a special citizen award. His father had helped found the branch.

Following his retirement, Chambers continued to work at his family's barber shop. Chambers and his brothers, Phillip and Carol, owned the Chambers Brothers Barber Shop at 135 West Street, where John Chambers had worked evenings even during his career as alderman. The shop served as an anchor in the community, from its inception in 1944 until its closing in 1995. When the shop closed, the Capital reported that "John Chambers will retire to a home on Hicks Avenue across from where he was born and down the hill from his church, Mt. Olive A.M.E.... 'I intend to help other people and serve my community,' he said. 'That's what I'm accustomed to.' John died of a heart attack on February 25, 2011, 4 days shy of his 83rd birthday.

[3]
