= Robert Carter III =

American planter and politician (1728–1804)

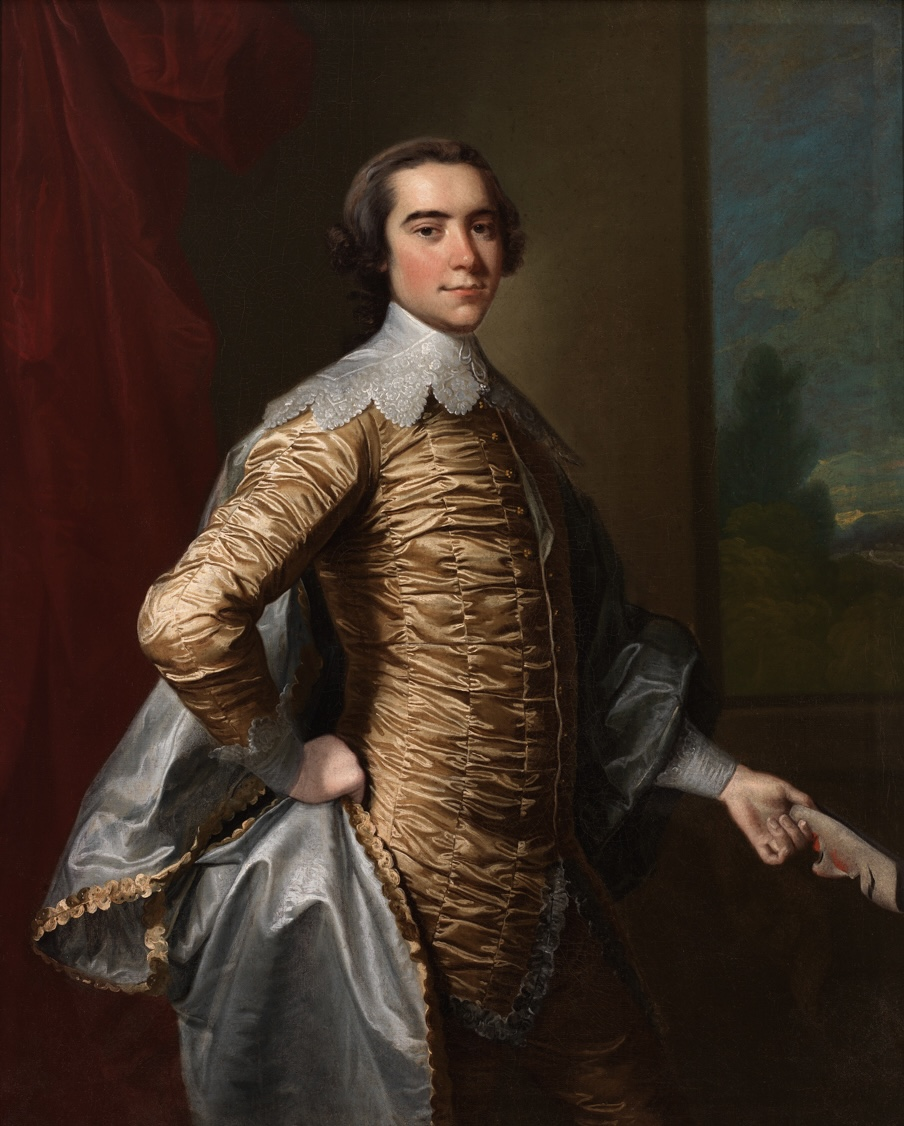
- Portrait by Thomas Hudson, c. 1753
- Born: February 28, 1728; Corotoman, Lancaster County, Virginia Colony
- Died: March 10, 1804 (aged 76); Baltimore, Maryland
- Education: College of William and Mary
- Occupations: Planter, politician
- Spouse: Frances Ann Tasker
- Children: 17

Robert Carter III (February 28, 1728 – March 10, 1804) was an American planter and politician from the Northern Neck of Virginia. During the colonial period, he sat on the Virginia Governor's Council for roughly two decades. After the American Revolutionary War saw the Thirteen Colonies gain independence from the British Empire as the United States, Carter, influenced by his Baptist beliefs, began the largest manumission in the history of the United States prior to the American Civil War.

Despite strong opposition from family members and neighbors, Carter began emancipating the hundreds of slaves he owned via a deed of gift filed with the Northumberland County, Virginia authorities on September 5, 1791, seventy years before the Civil War. Over the following years, Carter gradually emancipated over 500 of his slaves by filing documents with the Northumberland County, Virginia authorities, and settled many freedmen on land he gave them. Carter died in Baltimore, Maryland in 1804.

== Early life and education ==
Carter was born into one of the First Families of Virginia, as a grandson of Virginia land baron Robert "King" Carter of Corotoman. In 1732, both his father and grandfather died within four months of each other, leaving the young boy in the care of his uncles Charles and Landon Carter, as well as his mother. In 1735, she remarried to John Lewis of Warner Hall in Gloucester County.

Although his uncles had been sent to England for their education, young Robert was sent to the College of William and Mary, beginning with preparatory classes since he was only nine years old. In 1749 he reached legal age and received his inheritance. After crossing the Atlantic Ocean to Liverpool with Lawrence Washington, Carter traveled to London, where he and Philip Ludwell Lee started legal studies at the Inner Temple.

=== Family life ===
In 1754, Carter married Frances Ann Tasker, daughter of former Maryland governor Benjamin Tasker. They ultimately had seventeen children, of whom eight daughters and four sons reached adulthood. The successful marriage seemed to settle Carter, who began to pay attention to his vast landholdings, as well as politics.

=== Early career ===
Carter returned to Virginia in 1751 where he was admitted to the bar. He took up residence at Nomony Hall. This was his preferred spelling for his inherited plantation on the Northern Neck. Nominy or Nomini are more commonly used today, as in the highway marker noting the plantation site. He also became a local justice of the peace for Westmoreland County in 1752; the county justices of that era also jointly administering the county. However, Carter was unsuccessful in at least two campaigns to become one of the county's two (part-time) representatives in the House of Burgesses.

In 1758, using his in-laws' connections with the Board of Trade, Carter secured an appointment from George II to the Virginia Governor's Council. When George III succeeded to the throne in 1760, Carter was reappointed to the post, which served as the colony's appellate court as well as advised on executive matters. Carter purchased a house in Williamsburg from his cousin Robert Carter Nicholas Sr. and moved his growing family there in 1761. Carter also began reading voraciously, as well as socializing with the city's top intellectuals, including Governor Fauquier, George Wythe, William Small, John Blair and young Thomas Jefferson a classmate of Carter's.

== Patriotism ==
At first loyal to his King, Carter expressed support for the Crown during the period of popular rejoicing that accompanied news of George III's repeal of the Stamp Act, but Parliament passed additional laws obnoxious to colonial interests, and by 1772 the new Governor Dunmore exacerbated tensions. That year, Carter moved his ailing family (having lost three young daughters to unknown illnesses within 11 months) back to Nomony Hall on the Northern Neck, announcing his retirement from public life. Carter never appeared in the Governor's Council minutes (other than as present) after it voted to allow slaveholders or local authorities to punish slaves without due process. Moreover, rather than educate his sons at the College of William and Mary, Carter hired Philip Fithian as tutor.

Carter concentrated his efforts on trade, including ironworks, a textile factory, and a flour mill, in addition to draining swamps around Nomony and diversifying crops at all his plantations. Although publicly neutral, Carter honored the continental boycott declared in 1774, and in 1775 joined Richard Corbin in expressing the council's concern about rumors of British marines being stationed at Williamsburg. Carter declined to give the loyalty assurances Dunmore required, and the governor dissolved the council in 1776. The following summer, he gave an oath of loyalty to the new Commonwealth of Virginia. Although Carter declined to hold political offices suggested by Patriot friends, he began supplying provisions and bayonets to Patriot forces during the American Revolutionary War, which resulted in his plantations near the Potomac River being raided by British ships.

== Slaveholding and spiritual seeking ==
Although his great-grandfather John Carter Senior had freed slaves in his will (as well as provided homesteads and livestock for them), the colony of Virginia made individual manumission illegal in the year Carter's father and grandfather died. It was not authorized again until 1783. King Carter had greatly expanded the institution of slavery in Virginia, by purchasing many from ships to work on his plantations. He owned more than a thousand slaves upon his death. King Carter gave his grandson Robert III his first slave (a girl) when the infant was three months old. By the time he came of legal age in 1749, Robert Carter III owned 6,500 acres (2,600 ha) of land and 100 slaves.

Although Carter sold land and some slaves to pay his debts in 1758, he did not purchase more slaves (unlike George Washington and other neighbors). He became known among his neighbors for his humane treatment of the enslaved workers in this region. Carter rarely whipped slaves, or allowed them to be whipped, let alone scarred them, although he whipped his own children, particularly his eldest son Robert Bladen. Carter's plantations had roughly double the rate of slave population increase as others in the state. Carter was particularly moved by the example of Governor Fauquier, who in his will allowed his slaves to choose their masters.

When Carter became a co-administrator of his father-in-law's estate, he (with the support of Daniel Dulany) delayed scheduling a sale of the slaves of Bel-Air plantation, since that would break up families. But his delays led to more than 18 years of litigation with his Tasker in-laws.

=== Conversion ===
Carter became known for his religious freethinking and support of Dissenters even before the Revolution. He resigned from the Cople Parish Church vestry in 1776. During the following year he had a mystical experience while feverish from a smallpox inoculation. This prompted further spiritual seeking, from composing his own prayer for God to "have pity upon all Jews, Turks, Infidels & Hereticks", to making trips to attend services and hear from Quaker, Methodist, Presbyterian and Baptist preachers (all classified as dissenters), and investigating Arminianism and perhaps Catholicism (although these pursuits were illegal in Virginia at the time, where the Anglican Church was the state established church). On September 6, 1778, the Rev. Lewis Lunsford baptised Carter by immersion in Totuskey Creek. Carter scandalized neighbors further by joining Morattico Baptist Church, which had a mixed congregation of white and black, free and slave. In this period, most elite planters still belonged to the Anglican Church. Carter knew he risked persecution, for Eleazar Clay, another wealthy man, had his life threatened after such conversion. During the three weeks preceding his own baptism, Carter attended two different services that were attacked by armed mobs that included Revolutionary War veterans. His wife Frances Ann Tasker Carter, who was declared an invalid in October 1779 after the birth of their 16th child, moved to Bladensburg, Maryland, for health reasons. She converted to the Baptist faith there a year before her death in 1787.

Meanwhile, Carter became a prominent Baptist, serving on its General Association, financing the foundation of several churches in the Northern Neck, and corresponding with eminent ministers. The noted Methodist missionary and anti-slavery activist Francis Asbury also lodged at Nomony Hall at least twice after Carter's Baptist conversion.

Carter believed human slavery immoral, and tried to pass his beliefs to his children. However, his eldest son, Robert Bladen (although an admirer of the poet Phyllis Wheatley), at least twice sold young female slaves against his father's wishes. He also gambled and incurred such large debts that when Robert Bladen fled to England in 1783, his father was compelled to liquidate not only lands, but also slaves and thus break up families, in order to pay off his son's debts. In 1785 his son-in-law John Peck sold slaves whom Carter had given to his daughter Anne Tasker Carter as a dowry before the couple married and moved northward. Carter gave his remaining daughters dowries that did not include human property.

In February 1786, Carter decided to send his youngest sons George and John Tasker Carter to the new Baptist university in Rhode Island (what is now Brown University). He wrote to its minister president James Manning:

I beg leave to appoint you their Foster Father intimating that my desire is that both my Said Sons shd. be active Characters in Life ... The prevailing Notion now is to Continue the most abject State of Slavery in this [Virginia] Common-Wealth – On this Consideration only, I do not intend that these my two Sons shall return to this State till each of them arrive to the Age of 21 years.

In November 1788, Carter sent three daughters to live with Baptist friends in Baltimore, instructing their hosts "Girls are not to act by a Maid, but by themselves." But he also sent a slave as barter for their room and board.

During the 1780s, some Baptists began to segregate their meetings. After the Baptist Ketocton Association of churches passed a motion that hereditary slavery was "contrary to the word of God," and Morattico Baptist Church changed its rule to allow only free male members to vote on church issues, tumult rocked the General Committee. Carter's wife had died and the grieving widower responded to the changes by drafting a charter for Yeocomico Church that required egalitarian voting. He left Morattico for the splinter congregation, signing its charter below the signatures of several slaves. Carter unsuccessfully ran for a position in the Virginia Ratification Convention. While struggling with several bouts of illness, he was cared for by his daughter Sarah Fairfax Carter. He postponed her proposed marriage to Richard Bland Lee, perhaps because of the suitor's pro-slavery ideas.

Carter continued to host spiritual seekers, including a "Mr. Moyce," who in January 1788 introduced him to the writings of Emanuel Swedenborg, a Scandinavian aristocrat, scientist and mystic who had developed followers in London. Carter began to request copies of his writings from business correspondents. In December 1789, Carter believed he "died", perhaps another religious experience tinged by illness. In 1790, Carter wrote in a letter to English Baptist minister John Rippon that "the toleration of slavery indicates very great depravity of mind." He also criticized ministers who offered universal redemption, but only "partial Election before Creation". In the nineteenth century, as some Virginia Baptist churches became more accommodating of slavery, it began to grow in the number of members. In 1790 it claimed 20,000 members in Virginia; a decade later, well after the disestablishment of the Anglican Church, it had become Virginia's second largest sect.

== Manumission ==
In the years after the Revolutionary War, Virginia's legislature (having barred international slave trade in 1778) passed several laws sympathetic to freeing slaves, although it did not pass a law legalizing manumission until 1782, and throttled many petitions for wider emancipation. Numerous slaveholders in the Chesapeake Bay area freed their slaves, often in their wills (like Quaker John Pleasants) or deeds, and noted principles of equality and Revolutionary ideals as reason for their decisions. The number of free African Americans increased in the Upper South from less than one percent before the Revolution, to 10 percent by 1810. In Delaware, three-fourths of the slaves had been freed by 1810. In the decade after the act's passage, Virginians had freed 10,000 slaves, without visible social disruptions. The price of slaves reached a 20-year low as the percentage listed as "black, tithable" (i.e. slaves) fell below 40%, the lowest point in the century. However, Virginia's courts sidestepped issuing appellate decisions ratifying emancipation until 1799, and the methodology of within-life emancipation was not established.

Carter hoped Virginia's legislature would pass a gradual emancipation plan, as did New York and New Jersey. His neighbor Ferdinando Fairfax published one such plan in a Philadelphia-based journal, and Quaker Warner Mifflin presented petitions to Congress to do the same, but James Madison buried the proposals in committee. In early 1791, Carter refused to rent a plantation to Charles Mynn Thruston, a Revolutionary veteran and Anglican minister, with whose racial views he disagreed. His Baptist friend John Leland left Virginia after a final anti-slavery sermon, which Carter copied in full into his journal.

Carter began a personal program of gradual manumission of slaves on his many plantations. He announced his plan on August 1, 1791, and began a new legal process by recording a Deed of Gift in Northumberland County on September 5, 1791. Since the manumission law required a five shilling fee, and Carter had plantations and slaves in several Virginia counties, he corresponded with the Westmoreland County clerk (where he resided) and followed up by filing manumission papers at the Westmoreland County court sessions the following February, May, July and August. His actions were resisted by his son-in-law John Peck, and various overseers and white tenants of his estates. Carter designed the gradual program to reduce the opposition of slave-owning white neighbors, but he failed to gain their support. He refused tenants' requests to relocate slave breeding women in order to circumvent the Deed of Gift. That winter Carter was shunned, although he sought help from fellow slavery opponents, including George Mason (who declined to help and cited his own age and infirmity). By the filings of February 27, 1793, Carter was ahead of his own planned schedule. Moreover, he refused to relocate freed blacks, and began offering them wages to work for him. He also offered some grants and tenancies, sometimes dispossessing obstreperous white tenants. Carter began investigating relocating to the District of Columbia. He leased Nomony plantation and its servants to his son J.T. on April 26, 1793 (expressly conditional to the Deed of Gift).

Then, before the next Westmoreland court session, perhaps victimized by mob action such as tar-and-feathers, Carter and his daughters fled by ship with Negro George and Negro Betty to Baltimore (on May 8, 1793). He never returned, despite numerous entreaties from family and friends. The meetinghouse used by the Yeocomico Baptist Church burned down six months after Carter left; Carter saved an unsigned complaining letter (which he believed from Thruston) that compared the Deed of Gift to fire destroying neighbors' houses.

== Later life and death ==
Upon reaching Baltimore, Carter was told that his son Robert Bladen Carter had died in London, nine days after being assaulted by a city sheriff trying to collect gambling debts. Carter joined the congregation of James Jones Wilmer, an Episcopal priest receptive to Swedenborg's views, bought a small house on Green Street, and began attending many religious meetings. Before leaving Nomony Hall, Carter locked his books and papers in the library, and gave the only key not to his son J.T., but to a wandering Baptist preacher named Benjamin Dawson. Dawson proved a corrupt debt collector, but a diligent abolitionist, duly securing legal papers from Carter in Baltimore and filing them in Westmoreland and other counties to free slaves. Carter made provision for his relatives, allocating them land, but not the slaves who were the subject of the Deed of Gift. On July 26, 1797, upon learning from Dawson that attorney John Wickham doubted the legal validity of the power of attorney which allowed Dawson to file further manumission papers, Carter executed an agreement selling Dawson his remaining slaves for the nominal sum of a dollar. Dawson duly filed this with the Westmoreland clerk, despite suffering a beating by Carter's son-in-law Spencer Ball.

Carter spent the last decade of his life issuing manumission papers pursuant to his recorded program, writing letters in support of freed slaves whose papers had been stolen, and contemplating religious and political issues. Carter lent money to Baltimore to build its city hall, negotiated with the Bank of the United States, and donated money to refugees from Saint Domingue, who fled the Haitian Revolution. Carter thought he had lived too long—mourning his daughter Anne's death in childbirth in 1798, and the deaths of Rev. Lunsford and his son-in-law John Maund in Caroline County, Virginia the following year. In 1803, the year before his death, Carter wrote his daughter Harriet L. Maund, "My plans and advice have never been pleasing to the world."

Citizen Robert Carter (as he preferred to be called) died in his sleep, unexpectedly, on March 10, 1804. His son and executor, George, brought the body back to Nomony and buried his father in the garden. The same day that George announced his father's death, he bought slaves for Nomony, in order to replace those his father had freed over his objection.

On April 3, 1805, Rev. Thruston, acting as judge of Frederick County, Virginia, refused to allow Dawson to record the scheduled deed for emancipation for that year, perhaps because of George Carter's objection. But on March 24, 1808, the Virginia Court of Appeals upheld Dawson's objection, declared the county court had erred, and authorized liberation of the slaves illegally held in bondage. Dawson continued to free sons and daughters born to Carter's slaves after 1791, as did Thomas Buck and John Rust after 1826.

== See also ==
- Robert Carter I
- Carter's Grove
- Slavery in the United States
- George Wythe

== Works cited ==
- Levy, Andrew (2005). The First Emancipator: The Forgotten Story of Robert Carter, the Founding Father who Freed His Slaves. Random House. ISBN 978-0-3755-0865-3.
- Baptists in America in A General History of the Baptist Denomination in America, and Other Parts of the World.
