= Dennis Claude =

American politician (1782-1863)

Treasurer of Maryland
- In office 1854–1860
- Governor: Thomas Watkins Ligon
- Preceded by: James S. Owens
- Succeeded by: Sprigg Harwood

Mayor of Annapolis
- In office 1853–1854
- Preceded by: Richard Goodwin
- Succeeded by: Abram Claude
- In office 1828–1837
- Preceded by: Richard Harwood of Thomas
- Succeeded by: John Miller

Member of the Maryland Senate from the western shore district
- In office 1831–1836
- In office 1821–1825

Member of the Maryland House of Delegates from the Annapolis district
- In office 1829–1830 Serving with George Wells Jr. and Nicholas Brewer
- Preceded by: Richard J. Crabb and John N. Watkins
- Succeeded by: Nicholas Brewer and James Williamson
- In office 1811–1819 Serving with Lewis Duvall
- Preceded by: James Boyle and George Mackubin
- Succeeded by: Thomas H. Carroll and Jeremiah Hughes

Personal details
- Born: c. 1782 Anne Arundel County, Maryland, U.S.
- Died: December 9, 1863 (aged 85)
- Resting place: St. Anne's Cemetery; Annapolis, Maryland, U.S.
- Party: Democratic
- Spouse: Anne Jacob (m. 1816)
- Children: 4, including Abram
- Education: St. John's College
- Occupation: Politician; physician

Dennis Claude (c. 1782 – December 9, 1863) was a 2-time mayor of Annapolis, Maryland (1828–1837, 1853–1854). He served as a member of the Maryland House of Delegates, in the Maryland Senate and as Treasurer of Maryland. He was the father of 4-time mayor of Annapolis Abram Claude.

== Early life ==
Dennis Claude was born around 1782 in Anne Arundel County, Maryland, to Abraham Claude and his first wife. He attended St. John's College in Annapolis and he studied medicine with Dr. Reverdy Ghiselin.

== Career ==
=== Medical career ===
In 1804, Claude was a surgeon's mate in the United States Army. In 1808, he became surgeon of the Regiment of Light Artillery and served in the south and southwest. He was admitted as a member of the Maryland Medical and Chirurgical Society in 1808. He later served as medical attendant and assistant surgeon at Fort Severn from 1819 to 1829. He also had a partnership with Dr. Reverdy Ghiselin.

=== Political career ===
Claude served as a member of the Maryland House of Delegates, representing Annapolis, from 1811 to 1819 and from 1829 to 1830. He was a member of the Maryland Senate, representing the western shore, from 1821 to 1825. In 1825, he was presidential elector of the third district. He again served as a member of the Maryland Senate from 1831 to 1836. He was president pro tempore of the senate in 1833. He served as mayor of Annapolis from 1828 to 1837 and from 1853 to 1854.

In 1831, Claude was a senate elector in Annapolis. He was treasurer of the western shore from 1844 to 1852 and Treasurer of Maryland from 1854 to 1860. He was appointed as comptroller of the treasury in 1861, following the resignation of William Henry Purnell on May 8, 1861. Until the fall of 1861, Claude and Abram Lingan Jarrett had competing claims to the office since Resolution No. 6 passed by the House of Delegates voided the election of Purnell as comptroller and Jarrett as victor. Governor Thomas Holliday Hicks would not administer the oath to Jarrett, however. On June 21, 1861, another law was passed by Jarrett to allow him to take the oath and serve as comptroller. Jarrett took the oath in July and Claude appealed to the Court of Appeals, but the Court of Appeals declared in favor of Jarrett being appointed by the legislature on October 8, 1861.

Claude was a visitor and governor of St. John's College. He owned stock in the Baltimore and Ohio Railroad and the Annapolis Gaslight Company.

== Personal life ==
Claude married Anne Jacob on February 13, 1816. They had four children, Ann H., Abram, William Tell and Elizabeth. His son Abram also served as mayor of Annapolis.

Claude died on December 9, 1863, aged 85. He was buried in St. Anne's Cemetery in Annapolis.

Political offices
| Preceded by James S. Owens | Treasurer of Maryland; 1854–1860 | Succeeded by Sprigg Harwood |
