= Philip Vickers Fithian =

American tutor best known for his journals and letters

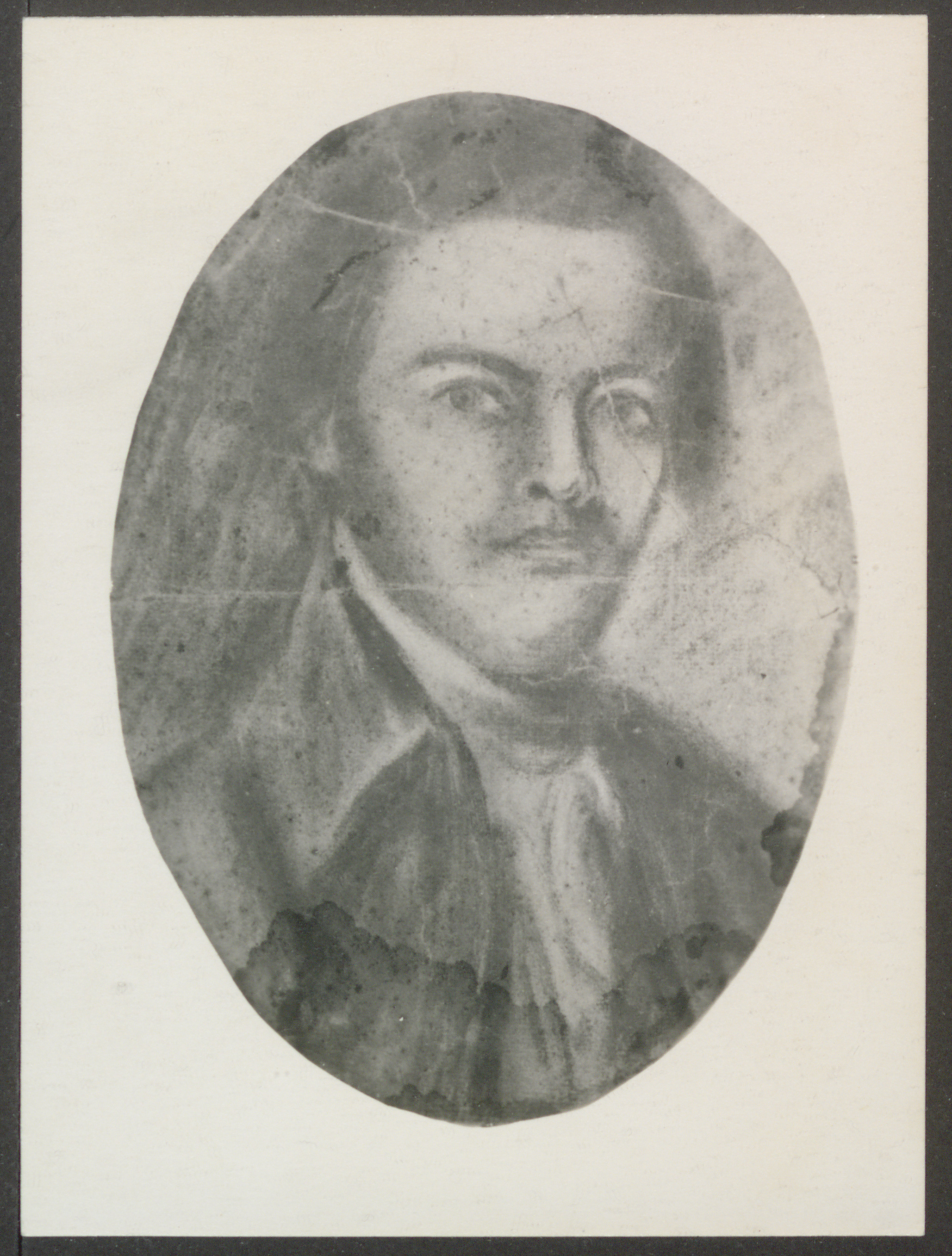
Portrait of Fithian drawn shortly before his death

Philip Vickers Fithian (1747 – October 9, 1776) was a peripatetic American tutor, best known for his journals and letters from 1773 to 1774 when he tutored at a Virginia plantation.

== Biography ==
Philip Fithian was born in Greenwich Township, Cumberland County, New Jersey, in 1747. His parents, Joseph and Hannah (Vickers) Fithian, were Delaware Valley grain growers. As the eldest of seven children, Fithian was destined to inherit the family farm and spend the rest of his life working it as Joseph had taught him. A lifelong Presbyterian, Fithian had a conversion experience during a local evangelical revival in 1766. The experience led him to consider a career as a Presbyterian clergyman. After convincing his father of the value of an advanced education, he enrolled at the local Presbyterian academy run by Deerfield Presbyterian minister Enoch Green.

At age twenty-three, Fithian left his home in Cohansey, New Jersey, to go to Princeton's College of New Jersey. He spent two years at Princeton and graduated in 1772. During his final year of studies, both of Fithian's parents died (the cause of death is unknown), leaving him to care for his six siblings. Fithian returned home to do advanced ministerial studies with Green at Deerfield rather than accept an invitation from College of New Jersey president John Witherspoon to stay and study with him at Princeton.

After a year at home and at Witherspoon's advice, Fithian postponed his ministerial ordination to accept a position as a tutor to the family of Robert Carter III at his "Nomini Hall" plantation on the Northern Neck of Virginia. During his trip to Virginia, Fithian recorded the famous diary that today serves as one of our most valuable sources on early Virginia life. His diary offers his observations on Virginia's slavery, plantation life, education, entertainment, and religion.

In 1775 and 1776, Fithian was sent to the Shenandoah Valley in Virginia and the Susquehanna River Valley in Pennsylvania as a missionary to the Scots-Irish Presbyterian settlements in the region. On October 25, 1775, Philip married Elizabeth Beatty, the daughter of noted Presbyterian clergyman Charles Beatty. Shortly after his wedding, he completed his missionary tour of the backcountry and then joined a New Jersey state militia regiment as a chaplain. Fithian witnessed the Battle of Long Island and the Battle of Harlem Heights before he died of camp fever near Fort Washington on October 9, 1776.

Fithian was highly critical of the harsh treatment of enslaved African-Аmericans by many Virginia plantation owners.

== Bibliography ==
- John Fea, The Way of Improvement Leads Home: Philip Vickers Fithian and the Rural Enlightenment in Early America Philadelphia: University of Pennsylvania Press, 2008 ()
- Hunter Dickinson Farish, ed., Journal and Letters of Philip Vickers Fithian: A Plantation Tutor of the Old Dominion, 1773-1774 Charlottesville, VA: University of Virginia Press, 1947
- Robert A. Peterson, Patriots, Pirates, and Pineys Sixty Who Shaped New Jersey Medford, NJ: Plexus Publishing, Inc., 1998
