= Joshua J. Cohen =

American mayor

Mayor of Annapolis
- In office December 7, 2009 – December 2, 2013
- Preceded by: Ellen Moyer
- Succeeded by: Mike Pantelides

Member of the Anne Arundel County Council
- In office December 2006 – December 6, 2009
- Succeeded by: Chuck Ferrar

Personal details
- Born: Joshua Jackson Cohen; May 31, 1973 (age 53) Annapolis, Maryland, U.S.
- Party: Democratic
- Spouse: Lesley Donoho
- Children: 2 daughters
- Education: University of Maryland, College Park
- Profession: Criminal Justice

Joshua Jackson "Josh" Cohen (born May 31, 1973) is an American Democratic politician and former mayor of Annapolis, Maryland. Cohen, a Democrat, gained 46.5 percent of the vote to defeat Republican nominee David Cordle (40.5 percent) and independent candidate Chris Fox (13 percent) in the 2009 mayoral election. Cohen, who served previously on the Anne Arundel County Council (District 6) and the Annapolis City Council (Ward 8), succeeded Ellen Moyer as Annapolis' chief executive on Dec. 7, 2009.

== Early life and education ==
A lifelong Annapolitan, Cohen was born on May 31, 1973, in Annapolis, Maryland, and grew up in the Murray Hill neighborhood and graduated from the Key School. He briefly attended college at the New Mexico campus of St. John's College, transferring to Towson University and then attending the University of Maryland. During college he interned at the Maryland General Assembly for Senator William H. Amoss, and on Capitol Hill for U.S. Senator Barbara Mikulski. In 1995 he graduated from the University of Maryland, College Park with a bachelor's degree in economics. He has also completed some graduate studies at the University of Baltimore.

== Career ==
After graduating from college, Cohen returned to the Annapolis neighborhood of Eastport and took an active role in the community. In 1997, he ran unopposed for the Ward 8 seat on the Annapolis Democratic Central Committee, and served from 1997 to 1999 as its chair. In 2001, he was elected to represent Eastport (Ward 8) as an alderman on the city council. He won re-election in 2005 by the largest margin of any candidate that year in Annapolis. Then in 2006, Cohen won election to represent the Annapolis Neck Peninsula (District 6) on the Anne Arundel County Council, claiming the seat left vacant by two-term Democrat Barbara D. Samorajczyk.

Before his election as mayor, Cohen worked in the criminal justice field for eight years. He served as a trainer for the Maryland Police and Correctional Training Commissions, as a Maryland Parole and Probation Agent, and as the Director of Special Grants for the Maryland Crime Victims' Resource Center, Inc.

== Election of 2009 ==
In the Democratic Mayoral Primary on September 15, 2009, Cohen received 1,334 votes to come in second out of six candidates. The winner, Zina Pierre, received 1,461 votes. Questions arose suddenly after her election win over Cohen regarding her actual residency and after it was determined that she lived in nearby Bowie to care for an ailing mother, she declined the nomination. The Annapolis Democratic Central Committee then convened and appointed Cohen as the Democratic nominee, and he went on to win the General Election with 46.5 percent of the vote in a three-way race with the other 2 conservative candidates splitting the remaining 54%.

== Mayor-elect status ==
After the election, Cohen created a wide-ranging transition team that he referred to as the "Idea Team," a group of more than 80 people representing a cross-section of interests, expertise and views on key issues weighing the city. Those issues included transportation, the budget and Market House. Cohen's eight subcommittees consisted of both supporters and critics. Candidates who ran against him, such as Cordle and Democrat Zina Pierre, were named to leadership positions on the team. The Idea Team was expected to release a full report to Cohen in January 2010, and its recommendations were expected to guide decisions for the new administration and city council. A few days before he was to take office, Cohen announced a six-member group that would serve as his core administration team. He named Doug Smith, the former president of the Ward One Residents Association who endorsed Cordle in the general election over Cohen, as his chief administrative officer (CAO). In Cohen's Inaugural Address on Dec. 7, 2009 he set forth a goal of making Annapolis "the best run city in Maryland" and identified three guiding principles for his administration: effective, efficient and transparent governance.

== Family ==
Cohen grew up in the Murray Hill neighborhood of Annapolis, the youngest of three children to Sandra and Joseph Cohen. In 2002, he married Lesley Donoho. The couple live in the West Annapolis neighborhood with their two daughters.

== Electoral history ==
Annapolis Mayoral Election 2009
Party	Candidate	Votes	%	±%
Democratic	Joshua J. Cohen	3,791	46.5	
Republican	David H. Cordle Sr.	3,302	40.5	−6.0
Independent	Chris Fox	1,044	13	−33.5

== Notes ==
Political offices
Preceded by Barbara Samorajczyk	Anne Arundel County Councilmember, District 6; 2006-2009	Succeeded by Chuck Ferrar
Preceded by Ellen Moyer	Mayor of Annapolis; 2009-2013	Succeeded by Mike Pantelides
