= Abram Claude =

American mayor

Abram Claude (December 4, 1818 – January 10, 1901) was 4-time mayor of Annapolis, Maryland (1849–1851, 1854–1855, 1867–1869, 1883–1889). He was the son of 2-time mayor of Annapolis, Dennis Claude.
