= Frances Ann Tasker Carter =

American slaveowner

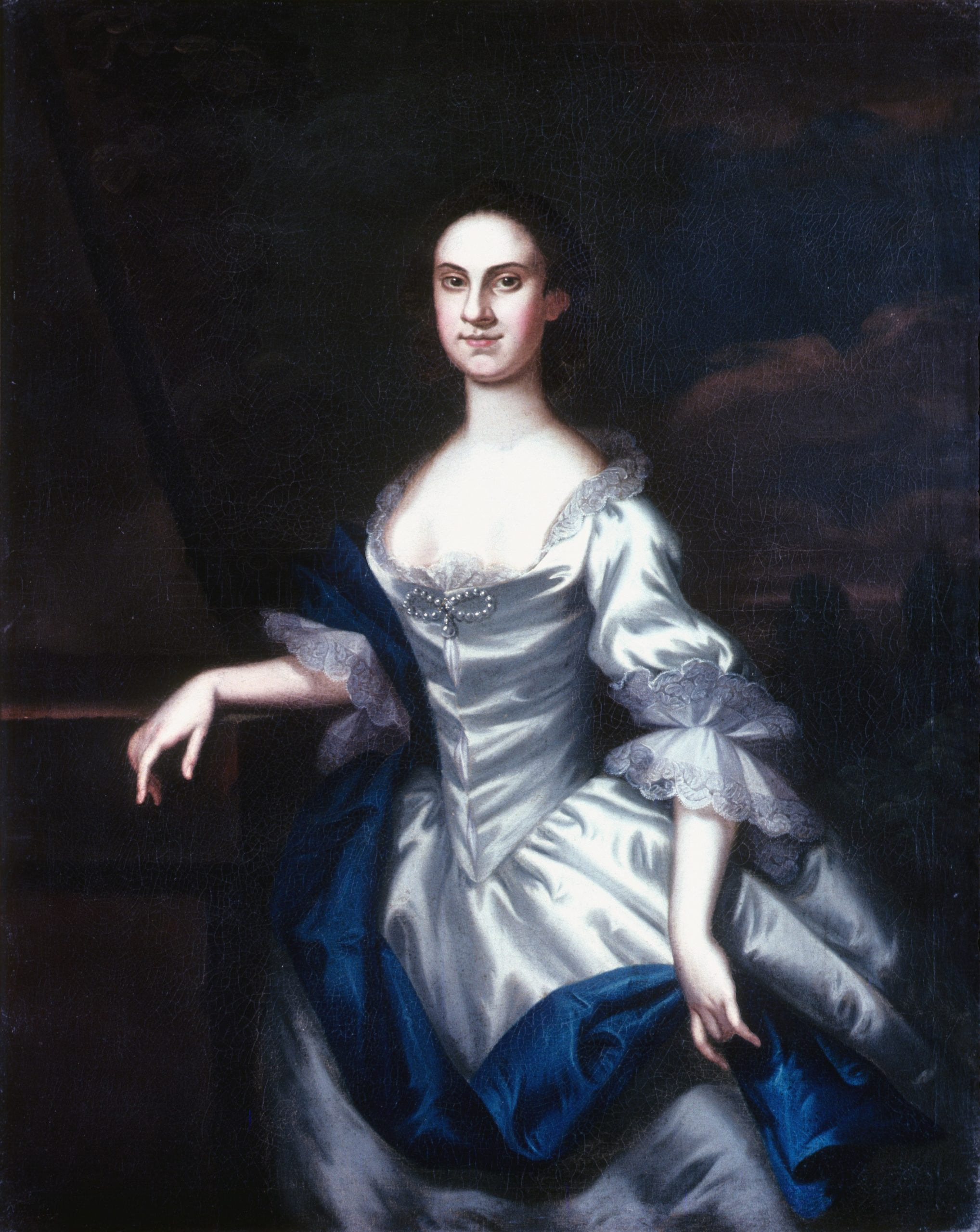
- portrait by John Wollaston
- Born: 1738
- Died: 1787
- Spouse: Robert Carter III
- Children: 17, including George Carter I
- Parents: Benjamin Tasker Sr. (father); Anne Bladen (mother)

Frances Tasker Carter (1738 – October 31, 1787) was born in Annapolis, Maryland. Her parents were Benjamin Tasker and Ann Bladen. Benjamin was one of the richest men in the Province of Maryland and a president of the Maryland Council and Provincial Governor of Maryland.

== Life ==
On April 2, 1754, Frances Tasker married Robert Carter of Virginia, the grandson of Robert "King" Carter of Corotoman, from whom he inherited a large estate called Nomini Hall. Robert and Frances Carter also had a house in Williamsburg. They owned a plantation where they had over 100 slaves. Robert was a member of the Virginia Council having been appointed by George II and later George III. They were one of the most wealthy families in all of Virginia.

Robert and Frances Carter had seventeen children, eleven of whom were living when Frances died. The children's names, in order of birth, were Benjamin (born 1757), Robert, Priscilla, Anne, Rebecca, Frances, Betty, Mary, Harriet, Amelia, Rebecca Dulany, John, Sarah, Judith, George, Sophia, and Julia (born 1783).

Frances Carter died at Nomini Hall on October 31, 1787.

Her husband, Robert, filed a "deed of Gift" in 1791, that set out provisions to free 452 slaves.

== See also ==
- Virginia Historical Society
