= John Brice III =

American politician (1738–1820)

John Brice III (September 22, 1738 – July 1820) was an American lawyer, businessman and political leader from Annapolis, Maryland. He served on the Maryland state council and as Lord Mayor of Annapolis.

== Early life ==
Coat of Arms of John Brice

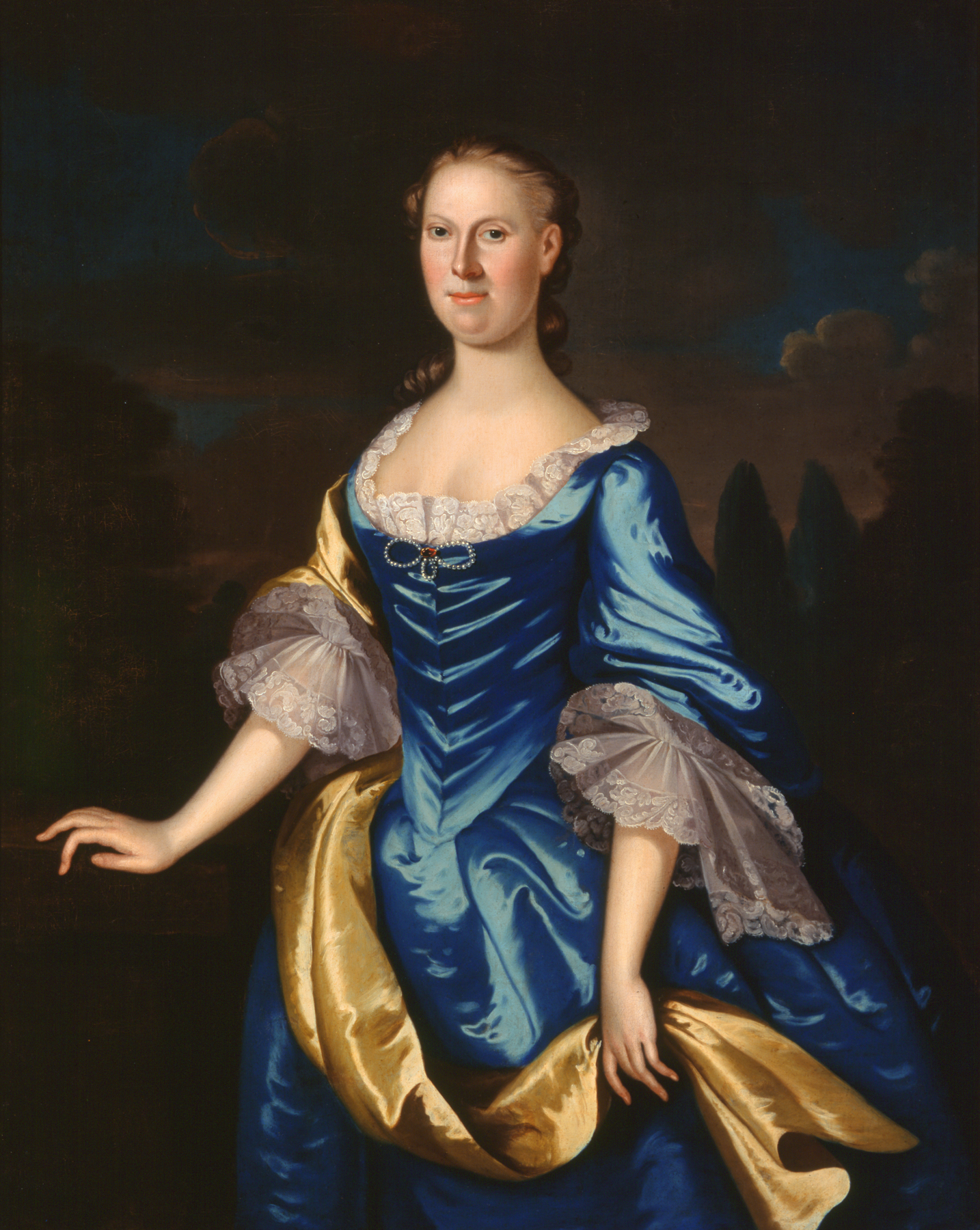
Mary Clare Macubbin, portrait by John Hesselius

John was born in Annapolis and was one of the sons of John Brice, Jr. and Sara (Howard) Brice. Like many fellow Marylanders, he attended Clare College, Cambridge, and studied law at the Middle Temple in London, being admitted to both in November 1757. He was back in Annapolis by June 1761, where he continued his legal studies. He married Mary MacCubbin in 1766 in the Anglican Church but after the revolution was accounted a member of the Episcopal Church.

== Revolutionary War ==
Brice was an active supporter of the revolution, and when a new government was established he served on the Governor's council in 1779 and 1780. The council acted as an upper house of the legislature. In the election of 1781 he tied with Stephen West, to whom he lost his seat by drawing lots. He was Lord Mayor of Annapolis in 1780 and 1781.

== Legacy ==
The home that John lived in still stands at 211 Prince George Street in Annapolis. It is a few doors away from his father's house which is locally known as the Little Brice House. The home is privately owned by St. John's College.

Preceded by Allen Quynn	Mayor of Annapolis; 1780–1781	Succeeded by John Bullen
