= Paul Tasker =

Electrical engineer

Academic background
- Education: BSc., 1979, PhD., 1983, University of Leeds

Paul Juan Tasker is an electrical engineer known for his research on microwaves. He is a professor at Cardiff University, Wales, and a Fellow of the Institute of Electrical and Electronics Engineers.

== Education and career ==
Tasker earned his Bachelor of Science and PhD from the University of Leeds.

With his PhD, Tasker worked as a research associate at Cornell University from 1984 to 1990, and later as a senior researcher and manager with the Fraunhofer Institute for Applied Solid State Physics (IAF). He eventually joined the faculty of Engineering at Cardiff University in 1995.

In 1997, Tasker established the Institute of High Frequency and Communication Engineering at Cardiff University, which was later bought by Focus Microwaves Inc in Canada.

== Recognition ==
Tasker was elected as a Fellow of the Learned Society of Wales in 2013. In 2014, he was named a Fellow of the Institute of Electrical and Electronics Engineers (IEEE) "for his contributions to microwave measurements and their application to microwave models". He and his coauthors Tim Canning and Steve Cripps were later awarded the 2016 Microwave Prize of the IEEE Microwave Theory and Techniques Society for their paper Continuous mode power amplifier design using harmonic clipping contours: theory and practice.
