= John Tasker (cricketer) =

English cricketer

John Tasker (4 February 1887 – 24 August 1975) was an English amateur first-class cricketer, who played in thirty three first-class matches between 1912 and 1919.

Born in South Kirkby, Yorkshire, England, Tasker was a right-handed batsman who scored 644 runs at 14.97, with a best of 67 for Yorkshire County Cricket Club against Cambridge University. He also scored half centuries against Nottinghamshire and Leicestershire. He bowled two overs which cost sixteen runs.

All but two of his first-class games were played for Yorkshire before World War I, with his two appearances in 1919 coming for the Army and the Army and Navy combined side.

Tasker died, aged 88, in August 1975 at Greenham Common, Berkshire, England.
