= Ellen Moyer =

American politician (born 1936)

Mayor of Annapolis
- In office December 3, 2001 – December 7, 2009
- Preceded by: Dean Johnson
- Succeeded by: Josh Cohen

Alderman, Annapolis City Council
- In office 1987–2001

Personal details
- Born: Ellen Louise Oosterling; February 12, 1936 (age 90) Camden, New Jersey, U.S.
- Party: Democratic
- Spouses: Roger Moyer (div. 1973) Tom Conroy (m. 1979; died 2002)
- Children: Five children; five grandchildren
- Education: Penn State University, B.A., 1958

Ellen Oosterling Moyer (born February 12, 1936) is an American politician and a member of the Democratic Party. She was the first woman to serve as Mayor of Annapolis, Maryland, having been elected in 2001. As mayor, she established the Annapolis Conservancy Board and the city's Greenscape program.

== Biography ==
Moyer was born Ellen Louise Oosterling to parents Henry John Oosterling and Mina (Johnson) Oosterling in Camden, New Jersey. She was raised in Towson, Maryland, and later attended Penn State University. She has been named a Distinguished Alumnus of Towson High School and Penn State's Board of Trustees recognized her with the Distinguished Alumni Award in 2007. She married Roger Moyer, former mayor of Annapolis, and had five children with him. Ellen divorced Roger in 1973 and remarried to Tom Conroy (d. December 4, 2002) in 1979.

Prior to serving as mayor, Moyer was a member of the Annapolis city council (1987–2001) and the Maryland Racing Commission (1999–2003). She also taught a year of fifth-grade in Baltimore County, Maryland, served as executive director of the Maryland Commission for Women in the late 1970s, as a lobbyist of the Maryland Teacher's Association, and as a member of the Strategic Committee on the State Plan for Higher Education (1999–2000).

In May 2025, Moyer announced her candidacy for Alderman of Ward 6.

== Personal life ==
Ellen Moyer has four sons, Guy, John, Michael and Steven, and one daughter, Loni Moyer. She has five grandchildren. Loni Moyer was elected to the Annapolis Democratic Central Committee in the 2001 election and is seeking appointment to a vacant Maryland House of Delegates seat in 2020.

Preceded by Dean Johnson	Mayor of Annapolis; 2001–2009	Succeeded by Joshua J. Cohen
