= Benjamin Tasker Jr. =

American slave trader, politician (1720–1760)

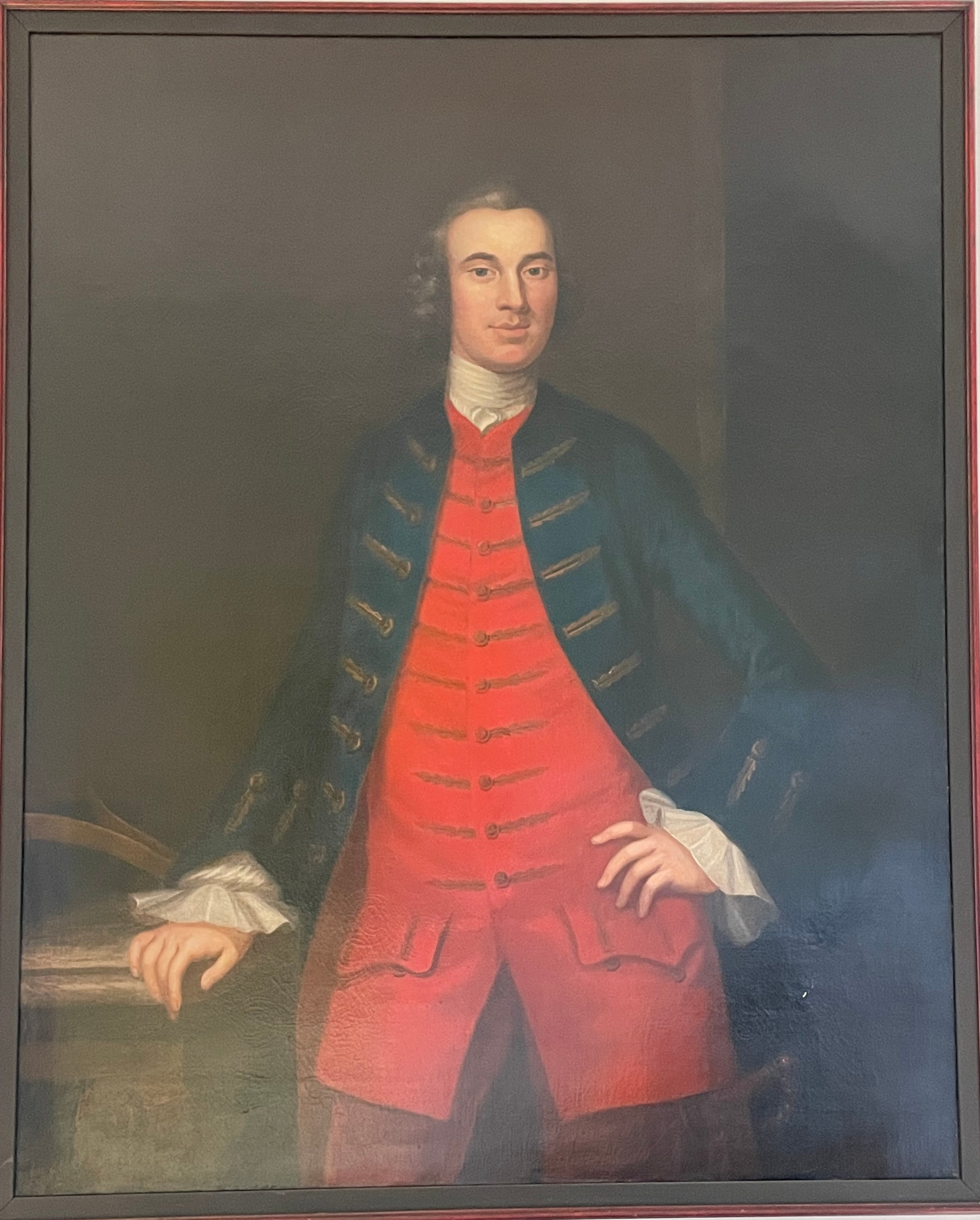
- portrait by John Wollaston

Lord Mayor of Annapolis
- In office 1754–1755
- Preceded by: Michael MacNamara
- Succeeded by: John Brice Jr.

Personal details
- Born: February 14, 1720 Maryland
- Died: October 17, 1760 (aged 40) Maryland
- Relations: Benjamin Tasker Sr. (father)
- Occupation: planter, politician

Colonel Benjamin Tasker Jr. (February 14, 1720–21 – October 17, 1760) was a politician and slave trader in colonial Maryland, and Lord Mayor of Annapolis from 1754 to 1755. He was the son of Benjamin Tasker Sr., Provincial Governor of Maryland from 1752 to 1753.

== Early life ==
Benjamin Tasker Jr. was born in Maryland in 1720, the son of Ann Bladen and Benjamin Tasker Sr., the Provincial Governor of Maryland from 1752 to 1753.

== Career ==
From September 1742 to December 1755, Benjamin Tasker Jr. was Naval Officer for the port of Annapolis (a position previously held by his father). Tasker was Surveyor General of the Eastern Shore from October 1747 to 1755.

Benjamin Tasker Jr. was appointed by Provincial Governor of Maryland, Horatio Sharpe as Commissioner, to secure the assistance of The Six Nations, having been voted £500 by the Maryland General Assembly for this purpose. This commission resulted in the Confederacy of 1752, a union of colonial interests for defense about a quarter of a century before the United States Declaration of Independence.

He was one of Maryland's delegates to the Albany Congress of 1754, another attempt on the part of the colonists to deal jointly with a common problem. He served on a committee at the Albany congress with Benjamin Franklin which was charged with the task of drawing up a plan for a central government of all the colonies. At the adjournment of the congress, the plan adopted was submitted to the various legislatures for approval. While it was rejected, its goals were pursued later at the Constitutional Convention in Philadelphia.

In 1752 he helped to organize a lottery to pay for a town clock in Annapolis.

He was dispatched to settle Cresap's War between Maryland and Pennsylvania.

Tasker partnered with his brother-in-law, Christopher Lowndes on the slaving voyage of the Elijah.

== Horse racing ==
An owner of thoroughbred horses, Tasker is noted in horse racing circles for having imported from England the mare "Selima" between 1750 and 1752. Sired by Godolphin Arabian, "Selima" was raced until the end of the 1752 season then was sent to Samuel Ogle's Belair Stud in Collington, Maryland. As a broodmare, "Selima" produced ten foals that would become an important bloodline in American racing with important racing offspring such as "Hanover" and is even the ancestress of George Washington's stallion, "Magnolia."

Tasker and Franklin became friends, and when Franklin visited Annapolis in the spring of 1755, he visited Tasker at the Belair Mansion, then being run by Tasker. Tasker died on October 17, 1760, around 40 years of age.

== See also ==
- Belair Mansion (Bowie, Maryland)

== Notes ==
Preceded by Michael MacNamara	Mayor of Annapolis; 1754–1755	Succeeded by John Brice Jr.
