= List of mayors of Annapolis, Maryland =

Mayor of the City of Annapolis
- Flag of Annapolis

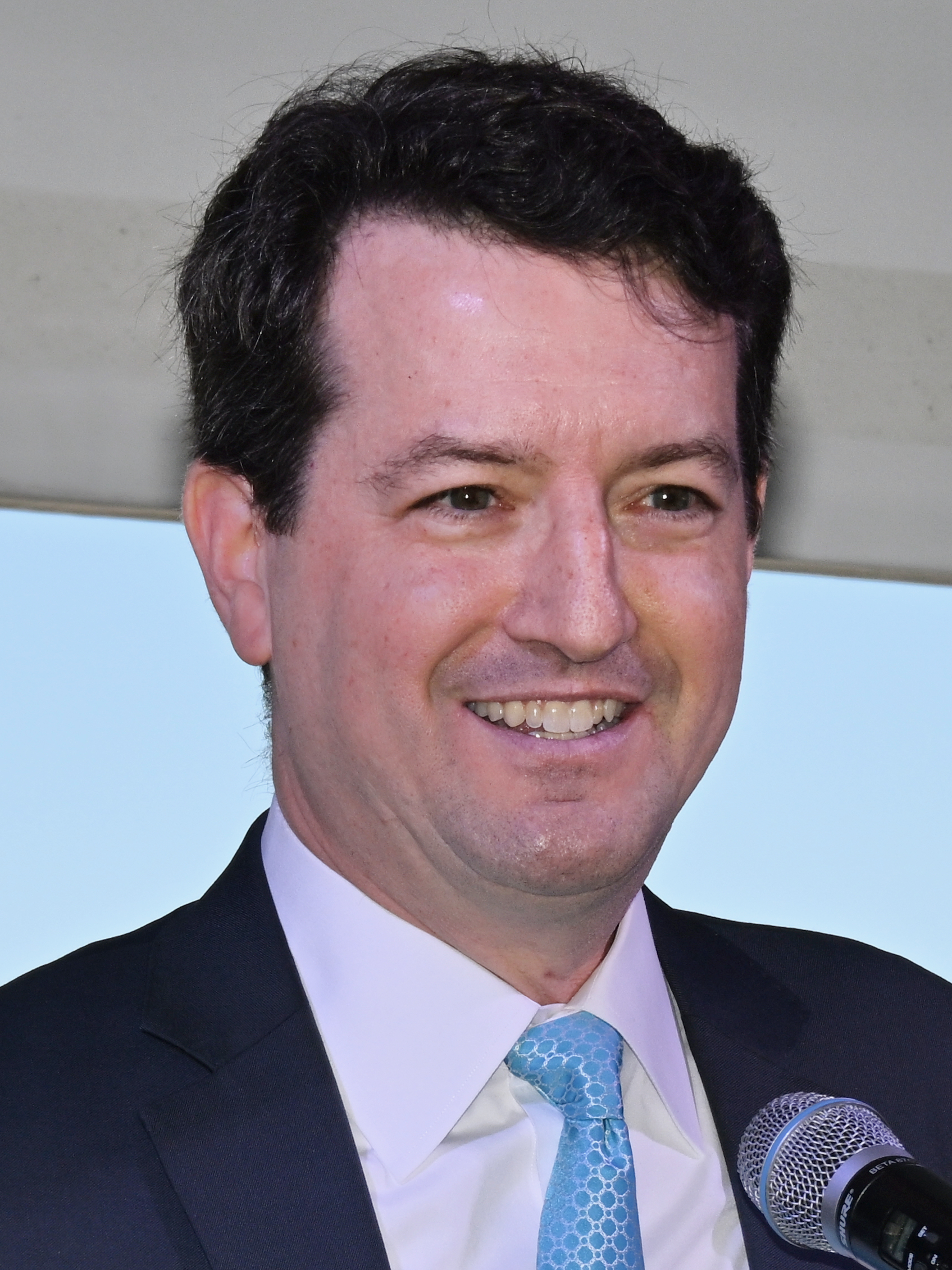
- Incumbent; Jared Littmann since December 1, 2025
- Style: The Honorable; The Right Worshipful (historical)
- Residence: Private residence
- Term length: Four years
- Inaugural holder: Amos Garrett
- Formation: November 22, 1708; 317 years ago
- Website: Office of the Mayor

The Mayor of Annapolis is the chief political figure in the city of Annapolis, which is the capital city of the U.S. state of Maryland. The mayor is elected to a four-year term. The office was originally created as the Lord Mayor of Annapolis by royal charter. Jared Littmann serves as the 138th mayor.

== History ==
Annapolis was incorporated on November 22, 1708 through royal charter, issued by Queen Anne, to become capital of the Province of Maryland. The city is the only mayoralty in the United States entitled to the dignity of lord mayor. That title was officially used for most of the 18th century, until it fell into disuse just after the conclusion of the American Revolution.

== List of lord mayors and mayors ==
- 1708–1720: Amos Garrett
- 1720–1721: Thomas Larkin
- 1721–1722: Benjamin Tasker
- 1722–1726: Vachel Denton
- 1726–1727: Benjamin Tasker
- 1727–1745: Vachel Denton
- 1745–1746: Robert Gordon
- 1746–1747: Michael MacNamara
- 1747–1748: Benjamin Tasker
- 1748–1749: John Ross
- 1749–1750: John Bullen
- 1750–1753: Benjamin Tasker
- 1753–1754: Michael MacNamara
- 1754–1755: Benjamin Tasker, Jr.
- 1755–1756: John Brice, Jr.
- 1756–1757: Benjamin Tasker
- 1757–1758: John Bullen
- 1758–1759: John Ross
- 1759–1760: Dr. George Hume Steuart
- 1760–1761: Michael MacNamara (MacNamara left Annapolis for England in April, 1761.)
- 1761–1762: Stephen Bordley (elected to serve out the rest of MacNamara's term)
- 1762–1763: John Brice, Jr.
- 1763–1764: Dr. George Hume Steuart
- 1764–1765: Daniel Dulany the Younger
- 1765–1766: John Ross
- 1766–1767: Walter Dulany
- 1767–1768: Upton Scott
- 1771–1772: Thomas Jennings
- 1773–1780: Allen Quynn
- 1780–1781: John Brice, III
- 1781–1782: John Bullen
- 1782–1783: James Brice
- 1783–1784: Jeremiah Townly Chase
- 1784–1785: Nicholas Carroll
- 1785–1786: Robert Couden
- 1786–1787: Allen Quynn
- 1787–1788: James Brice
- 1788–1789: John Bullen
- 1789–1790: Nicholas Carroll
- 1790–1791: Robert Couden
- 1791–1792: Allen Quynn
- 1792–1793: John Bullen
- 1793–1794: James Williams
- 1794–1795: William Pinkney
- 1795–1796: Allen Quynn
- 1796–1797: John Bullen
- 1797–1798: Philip Barton Key
- 1798–1799: Nicholas Carroll
- 1799–1800: John Davidson
- 1800–1801: James Williams
- 1801–1802: Allen Quynn
- 1802–1803: Samuel Ridout
- 1803–1804: John Johnson
- 1804–1805: James Williams
- 1805–1806: Samuel Ridout
- 1806–1807: Burton Whetcroft
- 1807–1808: John Kilty
- 1808–1809: Burton Whetcroft
- 1809–1810: John Johnson
- 1810–1811: Nicholas Brewer
- 1811–1812: Gideon White
- 1812–1813: Nicholas Brewer
- 1813–1814: John Randall
- 1814–1815: Nicholas Brewer
- 1815–1816: John Randall
- 1816–1817: Nicholas Brewer
- 1817–1818: John Randall
- 1818–1819: Nicholas Brewer
- 1819–1823: Lewis Duvall
- 1823–1825: James Boyle
- 1825–1828: Richard Harwood of Thomas
- 1828–1837: Dr. Dennis Claude
- 1837–1840: John Miller
- 1840–1843: Alexander Contee Magruder
- 1843–1845: Richard Swann
- 1845–1846: William Bryan
- 1846–1848: Richard Swann
- 1848–1849: Richard Goodwin
- 1849–1851: Dr. Abram Claude
- 1851–1852: Brice Worthington
- 1852–1853: Richard Goodwin
- 1853–1854: Dr. Dennis Claude
- 1854–1855: Dr. Abram Claude
- 1855–1856: Nicholas Brewer, III
- 1856–1858: Richard Swann
- 1858–1859: Joseph Brown
- 1859–1860: William Harwood
- 1860–1862: John Magruder
- 1862–1863: Wesley White
- 1863–1864: John Magruder
- 1864–1865: Solomon Phillips
- 1865–1866: Richard Goodwin
- 1866–1867: Richard Swann
- 1867–1869: Dr. Abram Claude
- 1869–1870: Augustus Gassaway
- 1870–1871: John Hyde (D)
- 1871–1875: James Munroe
- 1875–1877: Arthur Wells
- 1877–1879: James Brown
- 1879–1883: Thomas Martin
- 1883–1889: Dr. Abram Claude
- 1889–1893: James Brown
- 1893–1897: John Thomas
- 1897–1899: Dr. Richard Green
- 1899: Nevett Steele (Steele was elected mayor February 13, 1899, to fill the unexpired term of Green, who had died the month before. Steele served until the election of Seidewitz in July.)
- 1899–1901: Edwin Seidewitz
- 1901–1903: Charles Dubois (R)
- 1903–1905: Samuel Jones
- 1905–1907: John Douw
- 1907–1909: Gordon Claude (D)
- 1909–1919: James F. Strange (D)
- 1919–1921: John Levy (D)
- 1921–1923: Samuel Jones
- 1923–1925: Charles Smith
- 1925–1927: Allen Bowie Howard (D)
- 1927–1929: Charles Smith
- 1929–1935: Walter Quenstedt (R)
- 1935–1939: Louis Phipps (D)
- 1939–1941: George Haley (acting mayor, Jan. 17, 1939 to July 21, 1941)
- 1941–1949: William McCready (D)
- 1949–1952: Roscoe Rowe (R)
- 1952: Robert Campbell, Sr. (acting mayor following Rowe's death, nine months of 1952)
- 1952–1961: Arthur Ellington (D, acting mayor, Jan. 15 to July 20, 1953)
- 1961–1965: Joseph Griscom, Sr. (R)
- 1965–1973: Roger Moyer (D)
- 1973: Noah Hillman (D, served June 2 to 11; resigned 10 days before the end of his term as a way to honor Hillman, a long-time city councilman)
- 1973 – March 9, 1981: John Apostol (R, resigned March 3, 1981)
- March 9, 1981 – April 12, 1981: Gustav Akerland (R, alderman and acting mayor following Apostol's resignation; died April 15, 1981)
- April 12, 1981 – June 7, 1981: John Thomas Chambers, Jr. (R, alderman and acting mayor following Akerland's suicide; Annapolis' first African-American mayor)
- 1981–1985: Richard Lazer Hillman (R)
- 1985–1989: Dennis Callahan (D)
- 1989–December 1, 1997: Alfred Hopkins (D)
- December 1, 1997 – December 3, 2001: Dean Johnson (R)
- December 3, 2001 – December 7, 2009: Ellen Moyer (D)
- December 7, 2009 – December 2, 2013: Joshua Cohen (D)
- December 2, 2013 – December 7, 2017: Mike Pantelides (R)
- December 7, 2017 – December 1, 2025: Gavin Buckley (D)
- December 1, 2025 – 2029: Jared Littmann (D)
