= Mike Pantelides =

American politician

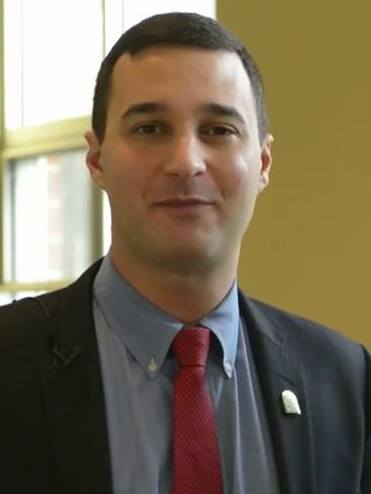
- Pantelides in 2015

Mayor of Annapolis
- In office December 2, 2013 – December 7, 2017
- Preceded by: Josh Cohen
- Succeeded by: Gavin Buckley

Personal details
- Born: Michael John Pantelides; September 5, 1983 (age 43) Annapolis, Maryland, U.S.
- Party: Republican
- Education: West Virginia University (BA)

Michael John Pantelides (born September 5, 1983) is an American politician who served as the mayor of the city of Annapolis, Maryland, from 2013 to 2017. He is a member of the Republican Party. Pantelides was elected in November 2013, defeating incumbent Josh Cohen. Pantelides was 30 years old at the time of his election and was the city's first Republican mayor in more than a decade.

== Early life and education ==
Pantelides was born in Annapolis, Maryland, on September 5, 1983, to parents John and Gloria Pantelides. He attended Archbishop Spalding High School in Severn. In 2007, he earned B.A. degree in philosophy from West Virginia University where he was a member of the Pi Kappa Phi fraternity.

A third generation Annapolitan, Mike's grandparents arrived in Annapolis from Greece and Cyprus in the 1940s and opened The Royal Restaurant in the heart of the city's historic district. Pantelides' first political experience came when he was 3, during his father's congressional campaign in 1986.

== Career ==
After graduating from college, Pantelides moved back to Annapolis. He served as an at-large member of the Annapolis Republican Central Committee and was president of the Germantown-Homewood Civic Association. He managed the campaign for Republican David Cordle, who in 2009 lost to Josh Cohen in the race for mayor. Pantelides also served as campaign manager for Jerry Cave when Cave ran for the state Senate in 2010.

Before being elected mayor, Pantelides sold government relations software (2012-2013) at Vocus, a Beltsville-based cloud marketing software firm. Prior to that position he sold advertising for The Capital newspaper in Annapolis, and The Baltimore Sun, for less than a year each. He also worked for his father, John Pantelides, as a land development consultant.

Pantelides is an Eagle Scout, and said during the campaign that he has been a volunteer with the Annapolis Jaycees, Habitat for Humanity, and 21st Century Education Foundation.

In November 2013, Pantelides was elected Mayor of Annapolis, becoming the city's first Republican mayor since 1997. At the time, he credited his campaign's success to his volunteers.

During the campaign, Pantelides ran on a "Sweep Annapolis Clean" platform, creating a crusade to change policy and processes in the city. During his first 100 days in office, he reorganized departments and created initiatives in an attempt to support business and economic development in the city. He worked with the city council to pass the city's 2015 budget, which succeeded by an eight to one vote. He also dealt with several resignations from city leaders in the early months of this term.

Mayor Pantelides set his own standard for the transition process in his administration. Pantelides opened up the application process for his transition team to the public. More than 200 citizens applied, and he appointed Democrats, Republicans, and Greens in an effort to be bipartisan.

Pantelides wanted an inclusive approach for citizen involvement. One way the Mayor's office is making it possible to communicate with populations that, in the past, were difficult to reach, is the Language Bank. Made up of 61 residents that speak 23 different languages, they offer their talents to the city, helping individuals to communicate through their translation services. Pantelides also brought on a Hispanic liaison to work with local faith based groups and the growing Hispanic community. But even with this effort, the mayor faced early criticism for a lack of diversity in city government.

Pantelides established an open door policy, and on the first Tuesday of each month citizens could come into his office and discuss concerns, offer advice, or ask questions related to Annapolis.

In March 2014, Pantelides came under fire for passing a profane note to an Annapolis City Alderman during a City Council meeting.

Pantelides also faced criticism when it was revealed that the acting city attorney met with the mayor's cousin in an Annapolis police station after the cousin was arrested for attempted murder.

Pantelides is an ex officio member of the National Sailing Hall of Fame, is a board member on the Annapolis and Anne Arundel County Visitors Bureau and sits on the Legislative Committee for the Maryland Municipal League.

In 2014, Pantelides endorsed Republican Anne Arundel County executive candidate Steve Schuh in the general election.

In 2017, Pantelides lost re-election to Democrat Gavin Buckley.

== Electoral history ==
Annapolis Mayoral Election 2013
Party	Candidate	Votes	%	±%
Republican	Mike Pantelides	3,934	50.3%	
Democratic	Joshua J. Cohen (incumbent)	3,874	49.7%	−0.6

Annapolis Mayoral Election 2017
Party	Candidate	Votes	%	±%
Democratic	Gavin Buckley	5,787	61.06%	
Republican	Mike Pantelides (incumbent)	3,671	38.73%	

Political offices
Preceded by Joshua J. Cohen	Mayor of Annapolis; 2013-2017	Succeeded by Gavin Buckley
