= Benjamin Tasker Sr. =

American politician (c1690–1768)

10th Governor of Restored Proprietary Government
- In office 1752–1753
- Preceded by: Samuel Ogle
- Succeeded by: Horatio Sharpe

Personal details
- Born: c. 1690 Calvert County, Maryland, English America
- Died: June 19, 1768 (aged 77–78) Annapolis, Maryland, British America
- Resting place: St. Anne's Churchyard
- Spouse: Ann Bladen (m. 1711)
- Children: 10
- Profession: politician; colonial governor

Benjamin Tasker Sr. (c. 1690 – June 19, 1768) was the 21st Proprietary Governor of Maryland from 1752 to 1753. He also occupied a number of other significant colonial offices, including, on various occasions, being elected Lord Mayor of Annapolis.

== Career ==
Benjamin Tasker was born around 1690 in Calvert County, Maryland, to Rebecca Isaacs (née Brooke) and Thomas Tasker. Tasker became a naval officer at Annapolis, Maryland, in 1719 and served until 1742. He also served in the municipal and provincial government as: member and president of the Governor's Council, 1722–1768; member of the Lower House of the Maryland Legislature, 1715–1717, 1720–1722; member of the Upper House, 1722–1766, 1768; President of the Upper House, 1734–1766, 1768; Annapolis alderman, 1720, 1754–1766; Mayor of Annapolis, 1721–1722, 1726–1727, 1747–1748, 1750–1753, 1756–1757; President of the Council in 1752; acting governor of Maryland, 1753.

In October 1731, Tasker was one of the founders of the Baltimore Ironworks Company.

In 1740, Governor Samuel Ogle was dispatched to England following England's declaration of war against Spain. He left Tasker with his power of attorney and in addition "the task of supervising the construction of a new house at Belair."

== Family ==
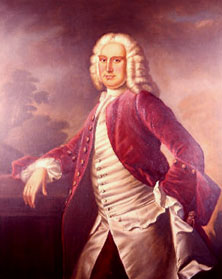
Governor Samuel Ogle, married Tasker's eldest daughter, Anne. Portrait at Mount Airy

Tasker married Ann Bladen, daughter of William Bladen Attorney-General of Maryland, in on July 31, 1711. They had ten children:

- William Tasker (1713-1715)
- Bladen Tasker (1719-1721)
- Benjamin Tasker Jr. (1720–1760), Mayor of Annapolis and slave trader.
- Bladen Tasker (1722-1723).
- Anne Tasker (1728–1817), married the much older Gov. Samuel Ogle (1694–1752).
- Rebecca Tasker (1724–1797) married Daniel Dulany the Younger in 1749.
- Elizabeth Tasker (1726–1789) married Christopher Lowndes (1713–1785), merchant of Bladensburg, Maryland and slave trading partner of Benjamin Tasker Jr. in 1747.
- Bladen Tasker (1730-1731).
- Frances Ann Tasker (1738–1787), married the wealthy planter Robert Carter (of Nominy, Westmoreland County, Virginia) at the age of sixteen, in 1754.

== Death and legacy ==
Tasker died on June 19, 1768, in Annapolis. He was buried in St. Anne's Churchyard in Annapolis. His tombstone reads:

Here are deposited the remains of the Honourable Benjamin Tasker who departed this life the 19th of June AD 1768 in the 78th year of his Age which though of a constitution naturally weak and tender he attained through the efficiency of an exemplary temperance At the time of his decease he was President of the Council a station he had occupied for thirty two years The offices of Agent and receiver general and judge of the prerogative Court he successively exercised Such were his qualities his probity equanimity candor benevolence that no one was more respected more beloved So diffusive and pure his humanity so singular the influence of his deportment that he was no one's enemy nor any one his These tombs are erected in the year 1826 in the place of the original ones which have decayed by the liberality and filial affection of Mrs. Ann Dulany of the City of London still longer to perpetuate the memory of those of her respected ancestors whose remains are deposited beneath them.

== Legacy ==
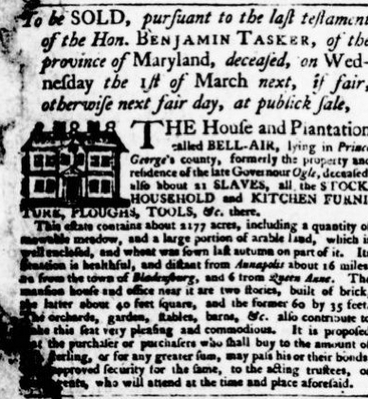
Newspaper advertisement for the sale of Tasker's estate Belle Air in 1771

Benjamin Tasker Middle School, in Bowie, Maryland, is named after him.

== See also ==
- Belair Mansion (Bowie, Maryland)

== Notes ==
Political offices
Preceded by Thomas Larkin	Mayor of Annapolis; 1721–1722	Succeeded by Vachel Denton
Preceded by Vachel Denton	Mayor of Annapolis; 1726–1727	Succeeded by Vachel Denton
Preceded by Michael MacNamara	Mayor of Annapolis; 1747–1748	Succeeded by John Ross
Preceded by John Bullen	Mayor of Annapolis; 1750–1753	Succeeded by Michael MacNamara
Preceded by Samuel Ogle	Provincial Governor of Maryland; 1752–1753	Succeeded by Horatio Sharpe
Preceded by John Brice Jr.	Mayor of Annapolis; 1756–1757	Succeeded by John Bullen
