= John Brice Jr. =

American mayor (1705–1766)

John Brice

Lord Mayor of Annapolis
- In office 1755–1756
- Preceded by: Benjamin Tasker Jr.
- Succeeded by: George H. Steuart

Lord Mayor of Annapolis
- In office 1762–1763
- Preceded by: Stephen Bordley
- Succeeded by: George H. Steuart

Judge of the Maryland Court
- Incumbent
- Assumed office 1751

Member, Governor's Council

Personal details
- Born: 1705 Anne Arundel County, Maryland
- Died: 1766 (aged 60–61)
- Spouse: Sarah Frisby
- Children: John Brice III; James Brice
- Occupation: politician

John Brice Jr. (1705–1766) was an early American settler and Loyalist politician in colonial Maryland. He was a member of the Governor's Council, twice Lord Mayor of Annapolis, and a chief justice in the colony's court. Two of his sons would in their turn become mayors of Annapolis.

== Early life ==
John was born in 1705 in Anne Arundel County, Maryland. His father John Brice and mother Sarah Brice (née Howard) were already prominent settlers.

== Marriage and family ==
Brice married Sarah Frisby in 1730 and had a number of children, including:

- John Brice III (1738–1820), lawyer and Lord Mayor of Annapolis.
- James Brice (1746–1801), Governor of Maryland and mayor of Annapolis.

Both sons would go on to enjoy successful political careers.

== Political career ==
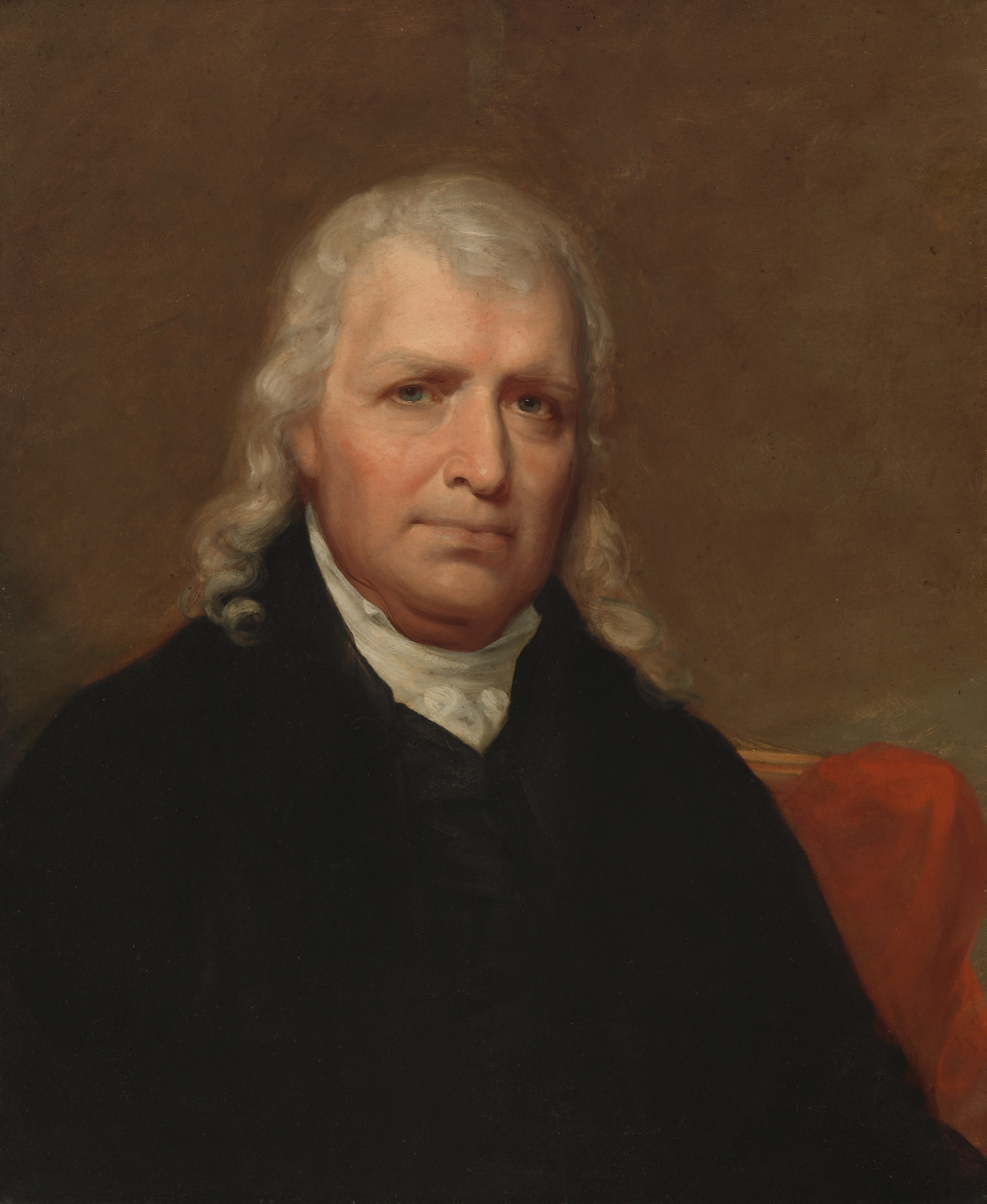
Samuel Chase, signer of the Declaration of Independence and Brice's implacable opponent.

John Jr. entered public service as the clerk of Anne Arundel County in 1738 and served in that post for many years. He enter politics as an alderman in Annapolis shortly after. He was appointed to the Maryland Court in 1751 and was named to the Governor's Council. He would serve in both offices until his death, and by the end of his term on the court he was the chief justice. He served twice as the Mayor of Annapolis (1755–1756 and 1762–1763).

== Coming of Revolution ==
Coat of Arms of John Brice

Brice held a number of Proprietary appointments and, politically, was a Loyalist. In 1766, Brice became embroiled in a war of words Samuel Chase, a vocal opponent of the Stamp Act and later a signer of the American Declaration of Independence. In an open letter dated July 18, 1766 (the year of Brice's death) Chase attacked Brice, Walter Dulany, George Steuart (1700–1784), and others for publishing an article in the Maryland Gazette Extraordinary of June 19, 1766, in which Chase had been accused of being: "a busy, reckless incendiary, a ringleader of mobs, a foul-mouthed and inflaming son of discord and faction, a common disturber of the public tranquility". In his response, Chase accused Brice and the others of "vanity...pride and arrogance", and of being brought to power by "proprietary influence, court favour, and the wealth and influence of the tools and favourites who infest this city." In particular Chase accused Brice of "spleen and bitterness", and a "passion for wealth" which had led him into "formidable frowns and opposition" to Chase.

== Legacy ==
Brice died in 1766 and hence did not live to see the end of British rule in Maryland. However, both of Brice's sons would follow him into politics. Both were elected to terms as Mayor of Annapolis, and in addition James Brice would become Governor of a free Maryland.

== See also ==
- Colonial government in the Thirteen Colonies
- List of mayors of Annapolis, Maryland

Preceded by Benjamin Tasker Jr.	Lord Mayor of Annapolis; 1755–1756	Succeeded by Benjamin Tasker Sr.
Preceded by Stephen Bordley	Lord Mayor of Annapolis; 1762–1763	Succeeded by George Steuart
