= Gavin Buckley =

Australian-American Democratic politician, born 1963

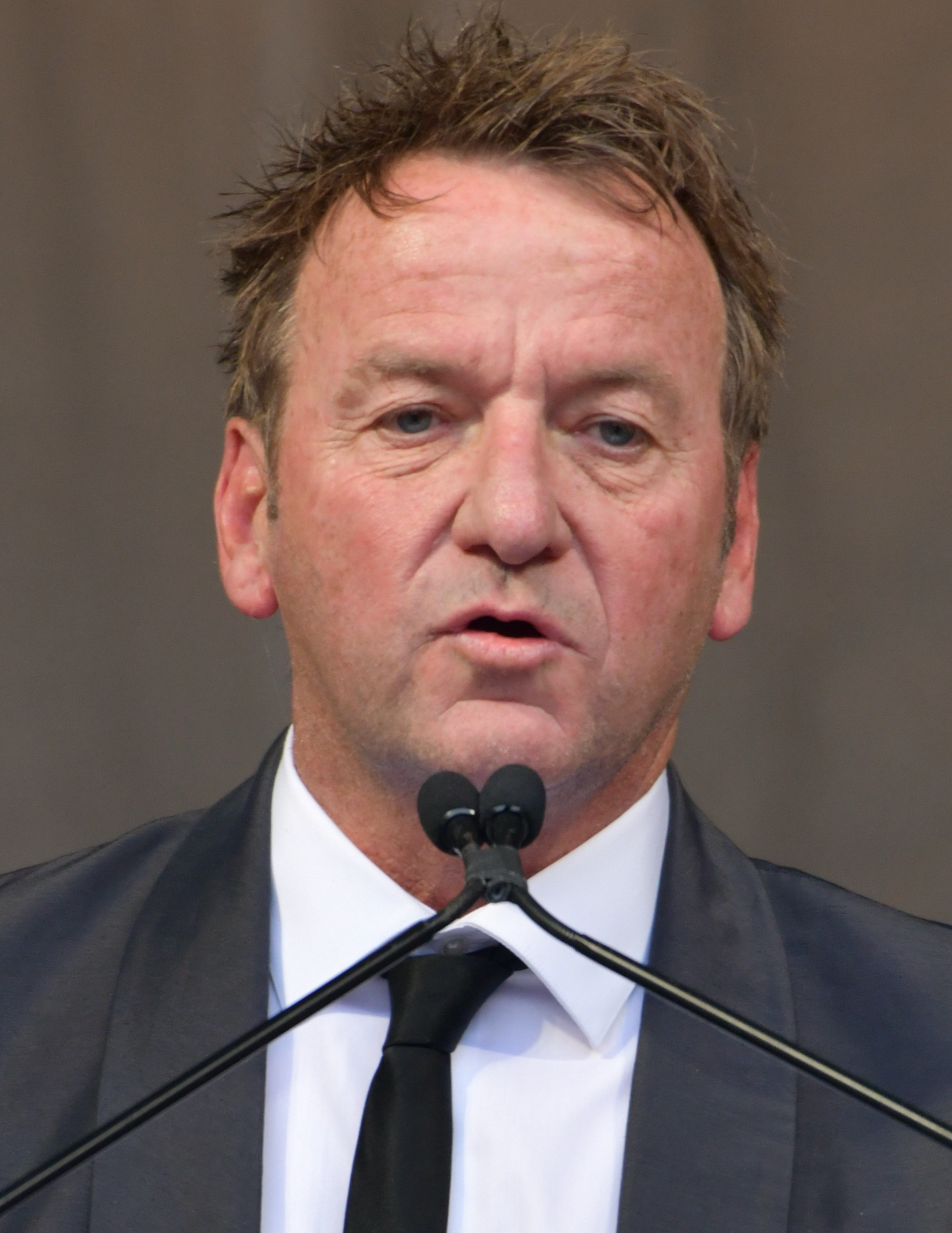

Member-elect of the Anne Arundel County Council from the 6th district
- Assuming office December 7, 2026
- Succeeding: Lisa Rodvien

137th Mayor of Annapolis
- In office December 7, 2017 – December 1, 2025
- Preceded by: Mike Pantelides
- Succeeded by: Jared Littmann

Personal details
- Born: February 8, 1963 (age 63) Boksburg, South Africa
- Party: Democratic
- Spouse: Julie Williams (m. 1997)
- Children: 2

Gavin Buckley (born February 8, 1963) is a South African-born Australian-American (Note: Buckley is a naturalised American citizen, but was raised in Australia, lived with his wife in Perth for five years, and has said "I still consider myself an Australian.") politician and former restaurateur who is a member-elect of the Anne Arundel County Council from the 6th district. A member of the Democratic Party, he was the 137th mayor of Annapolis, Maryland from 2017 to 2025. Born in South Africa and raised primarily in Perth, Western Australia, he moved to Annapolis in 1992, eventually opening multiple bars and restaurants in the city.

A Democrat, he was elected mayor in 2017, his first bid at elected office, defeating incumbent Republican mayor Mike Pantelides. He was re-elected in 2021.

As Annapolis Mayor, Buckley convened the City Dock Action Committee to crowdsource resiliency solutions to flooding at Historic City Dock (Annapolis' main harbor, which is operated by the City). His administration has undertaken numerous infrastructure projects, including HUD's Choice Neighborhood Initiative (CNI), a partnership with the Housing Authority of the City of Annapolis to revitalize distressed public housing properties at Eastport Terrace and Harbour House. In 2021, the City received upgraded financial ratings from all three ratings agencies, which Moody's said "reflects the city's sizable, diverse, and growing tax base with institutional presence, above-average demographic profile, manageable debt burden, and elevated pension burden." Buckley was in office during the Capital Gazette shooting on June 28, 2018, and has advocated for stricter gun control laws in its wake.

== Early life and education ==
Gavin Buckley was born in Boksburg, South Africa, and lived briefly in London before growing up in Perth, Western Australia. Because their father traveled often for work and then abandoned the family when Buckley was 8, Buckley and his twin, Paul, who died at age 14, were primarily raised by their mother, Pauline Brosnan, an Irish native active in the Australian Labor Party. Gavin was expelled from two Australian high schools, St. Norbert and Belmont Senior High School, for poor attendance; and began working in the countries of Scotland and France, and the U.S. State of Florida, where he arrived in 1985.

== Career ==
=== Business ===
Buckley came to Maryland in 1992 by boat, with only 200 dollars in cash; in the region, he found work as a waiter and farm laborer, among other jobs. He overstayed his initial visa, but was granted amnesty under Reagan administration-rules through his agricultural work, and was naturalized in 2009.

Buckley eventually settled in Annapolis, Maryland, where he began a business career, first opening a coffee shop called The Moon, and later four restaurants in the West Street area (Tsunami Seafood, The Metropolitan Kitchen and Lounge, Lemongrass Thai and Sailor Oyster Bar,). He was one of several partners in West Village LLC, which renovated a strip of dilapidated buildings on West Street near Tsunami in 2001 and restored a variety of businesses to what had become a "relatively desolate" part of the city. Buckley's businesses accrued several debts and contract disputes between 2006 and 2012, which he attributed to cash flow problems due to the Great Recession. Buckley was also cited by local authorities for failing to display boat registration numbers and failing to obtain a rental license.

A dispute with the local Historic Preservation Committee in 2015 over a large mural on the outside of Buckley's Tsunami restaurant brought him to public attention in municipal politics. Throughout the controversy, Buckley argued that Annapolis's economic development depended on loosening historic preservation policies, saying "We have to celebrate our history, but you can't get stuck in it."

=== Mayor of Annapolis ===
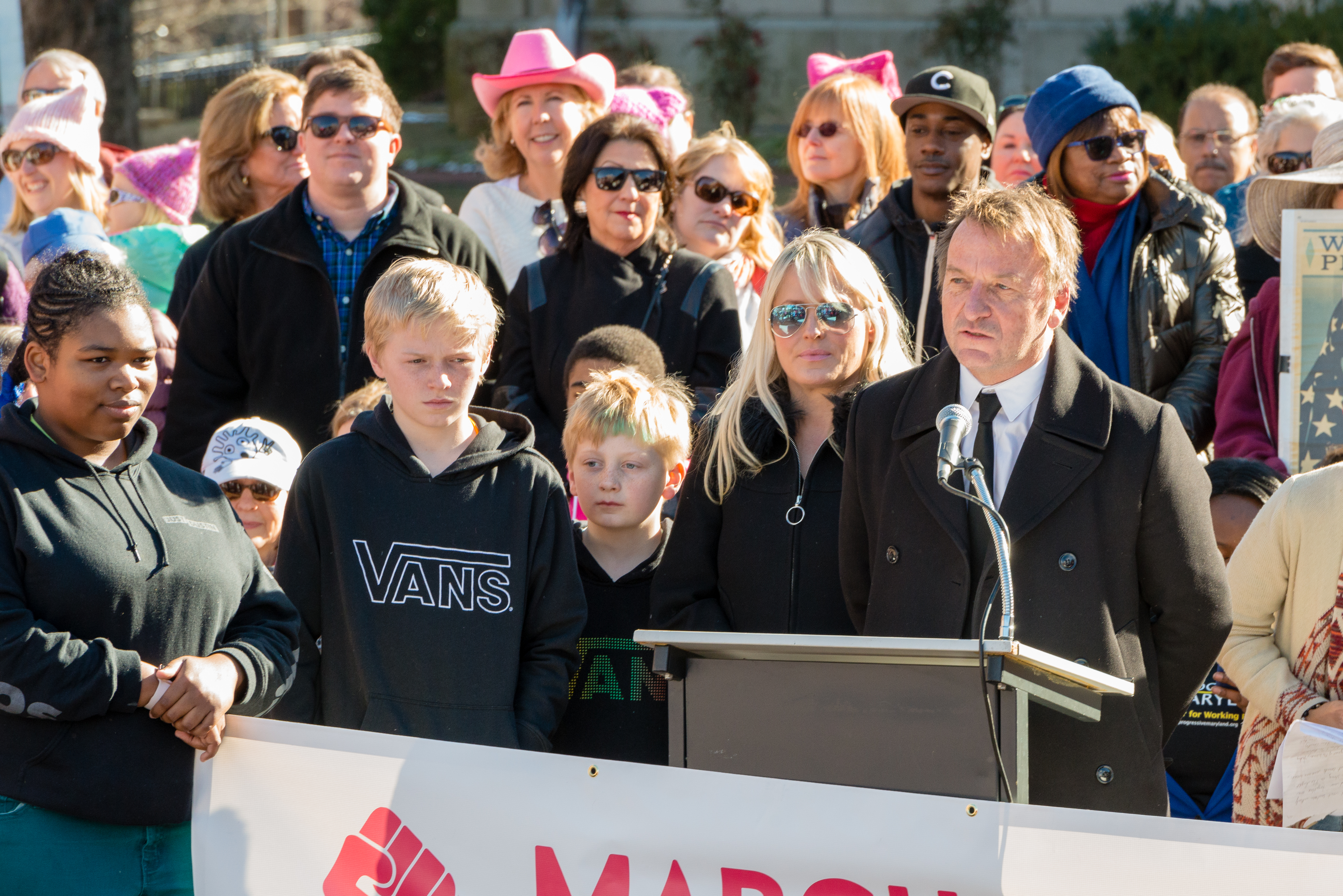
Buckley speaks at the 2018 Women's March in Annapolis

Buckley ran for mayor of Annapolis in 2017 with no prior political experience. He defeated longtime Annapolis State Senator John Astle in a Democratic primary with unusually high turnout, a "stunning" result after a primary campaign in which he presented himself as a contributor to the renewal of downtown Annapolis, a fresh voice from outside the political system, and an ally of underprivileged Annapolitans. In the general election campaign, Buckley proposed a "firestorm" of reform proposals, including replacing curbside parking on busy Main Street with a trolley, that his Republican opponent, incumbent mayor Mike Pantelides, mostly dismissed as unrealistic. The race was unusual for its relative civility, with Buckley and Pantelides dining together publicly. Pantelides's campaign at times contrasted his Annapolis pedigree with Buckley's Australian identity, but Buckley believes this tactic backfired, telling an Australian newspaper "People are very nice to Australians here." Buckley defeated Pantelides by over 1,000 votes in the November election.

As Annapolis Mayor, Buckley convened the City Dock Action Committee to crowdsource resiliency solutions to flooding at Historic City Dock (Annapolis' main harbor, which is operated by the City). Phase one of the project, the rebuild of Hillman Garage, was completed in 2023. Buckley has worked to strengthen ties with both of the city's two colleges: St. John's College and the United States Naval Academy. Work with the Naval Academy has included the development of a comprehensive flood mitigation plan that addresses the combined effects of land subsidence, sea level rise, coastal flooding/storm surge and stormwater management. Coordinating the Academy's plans with the City Dock Action Committee's work has fostered more consistent coordination on resiliency issues, with USNA leadership serving on the City Dock Action Committee and City personnel as members of the Academy's Sea Level Rise Advisory Council.

His administration has undertaken numerous infrastructure projects, including HUD's Choice Neighborhood Initiative (CNI), a partnership with the Housing Authority of the City of Annapolis to revitalize distressed public housing properties at Eastport Terrace and Harbour House. In 2021, the City received upgraded financial ratings from all three ratings agencies, which Moody's said "reflects the city's sizable, diverse, and growing tax base with institutional presence, above-average demographic profile, manageable debt burden, and elevated pension burden."

Buckley was in office during the Capital Gazette shooting on June 28, 2018, in which five people were killed at a local newspaper's office. In the aftermath, Buckley requested a federal proclamation allowing flags to be flown at half-mast; he told the press on July 2, that the administration of President Donald Trump—who had repeatedly described press members as "enemies of the people"— had denied the request. Trump's press secretary, Sarah Huckabee Sanders, called Buckley later that day; on the following day, the White House issued the requested proclamation, saying Trump had ordered it as soon as he learned of Buckley's petition. In the wake of the shooting, Buckley called for stronger gun control, blaming the National Rifle Association of America for opposing legislation restricting gun sales to certain people with mental illnesses, such as the accused Capital Gazette shooter, and suggested looking into gun buyback programs such as those enacted in Australia.

Buckley was reelected in November 2021 with 71 percent of the vote, one of the largest vote margins in City municipal elections in more than 70 years. He remained in office until December 1, 2025.

=== Anne Arundel County Council ===
On February 11, 2026, Buckley registered as a candidate for the Anne Arundel County Council. He defeated Republican nominee George Gallagher in the general election on November 3, 2026.

== Personal life ==
In 1996, Buckley underwent surgery for intestinal cancer at 33. A year later, he married Annapolis native Julie Williams and together they have a son, Dash and a daughter, Millie.

== Electoral history ==
Annapolis Mayoral Election 2017
Party	Candidate	Votes	%
Democratic	Gavin Buckley	5,787	61.1
Republican	Mike Pantelides	3,671	38.7

Annapolis Mayoral Election 2021
Party	Candidate	Votes	%
Democratic	Gavin Buckley	7,124	72.6
Republican	Steven Strawn	2,570	26.2

== Notes ==
Political offices
Preceded by Mike Pantelides	Mayor of Annapolis; 2017–2025	Succeeded by Jared Littmann
