= James F. Strange =

American mayor (1872–1926)

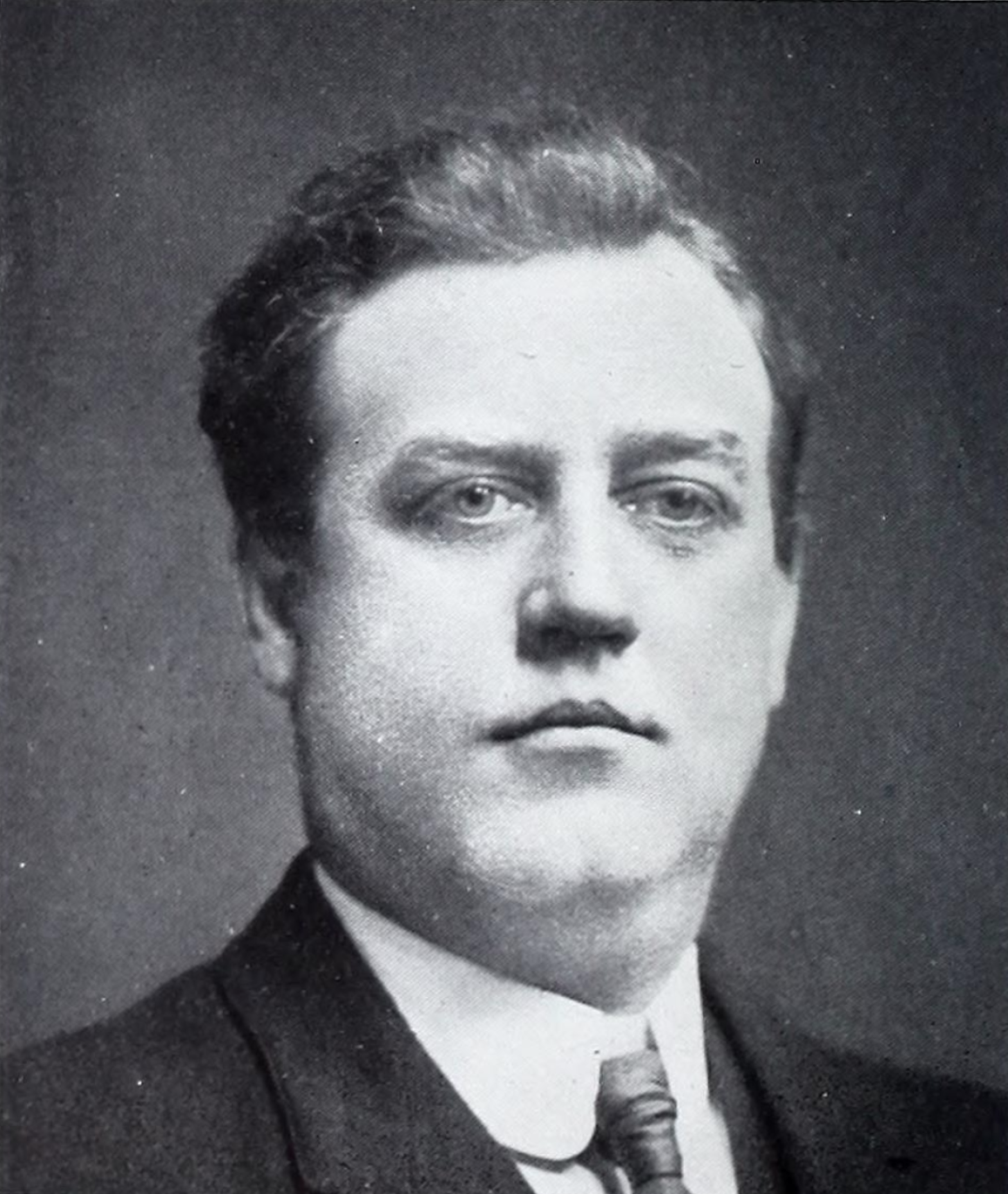
- Strange in 1914 publication

Member of the Maryland Senate
- In office 1924–1925
- Preceded by: A. Theodore Brady
- Succeeded by: George T. Cromwell

Mayor of Annapolis
- In office 1909–1919
- Preceded by: Gordon Claude
- Succeeded by: John Levy

Personal details
- Born: James French Strange; February 9, 1872 Annapolis, Maryland, U.S.
- Died: September 9, 1926 (aged 54) Annapolis, Maryland, U.S.
- Resting place: St. Anne's Cemetery; Annapolis, Maryland, U.S.
- Party: Democratic
- Spouse(s): Julia Maud Higgins (m. 1898; div. 1912) Geneva Kiddler (m. 1924)
- Children: 1
- Occupation: Politician; banker; merchant

James French Strange (February 9, 1872 – September 9, 1926) was a politician, banker and merchant from Maryland. He served as Mayor of Annapolis from 1909 to 1919 and as a member of the Maryland Senate from 1924 to 1925.

== Early life ==
James French Strange was born on February 9, 1872, in Annapolis, Maryland, to Caroline M. (née Yewell) and Robert Ellis Strange (1846–1908). He attended schools in Annapolis.

== Career ==
Strange worked as a merchant with his father in his contracting business Robert E. Strange & Sons. Strange enlisted in Company G, 1st Infantry Regiment of the Regular Army. He served for nine years.

Strange worked as a banker and served as vice president of the Annapolis & Eastport Building & Loan Association. He was director of the Annapolis Banking & Trust Company.

Strange served as president of the board of county almshouse Strange served as Mayor of Annapolis from 1909 to 1919. Strange served as vice president of the Fortification Conference of mayors of cities on the Chesapeake Bay. He served as election supervisor in Annapolis in 1921. He served as a member of the Annapolis City Council from 1903 to 1911.

Strange was a Democrat. He served as a member of the Maryland Senate from 1924 to 1925.

== Personal life ==
Strange married Julia Maud Higgins on February 9, 1898. They had one son, Robert French (born 1898). They divorced in 1912 and she died in 1919. Strange married Geneva Kiddler on January 2, 1924, in Baltimore. He was a member and vestryman of St. Anne's Episcopal Church.

Strange lived at 159 Main Street in Annapolis.

Strange died on September 9, 1926, in Annapolis. He was buried at the family lot at St. Anne's Cemetery in Annapolis.
