= Grievances of the United States Declaration of Independence =

27 colonial grievances listed in the Declaration of Independence

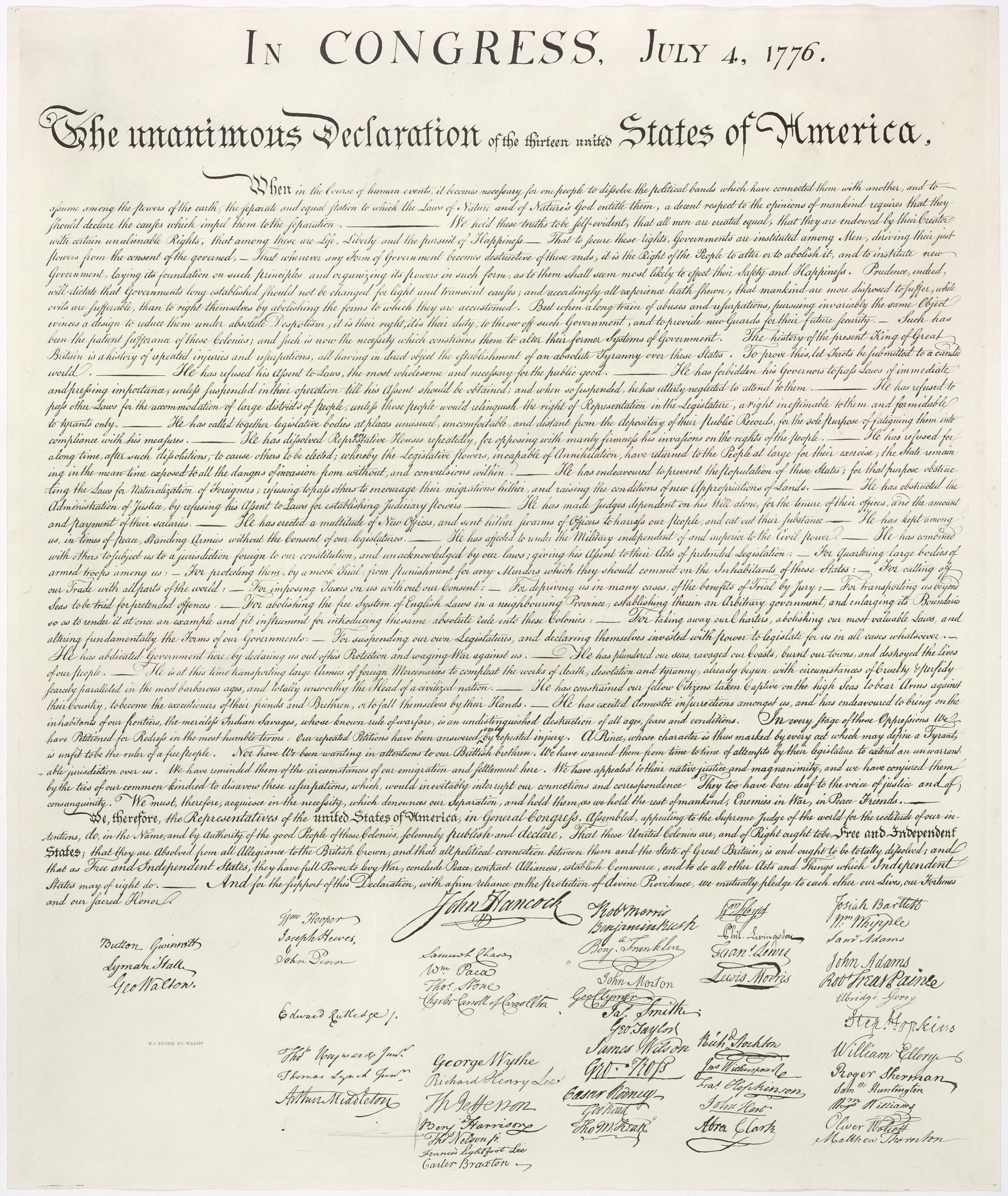
United States Declaration of Independence (1776)

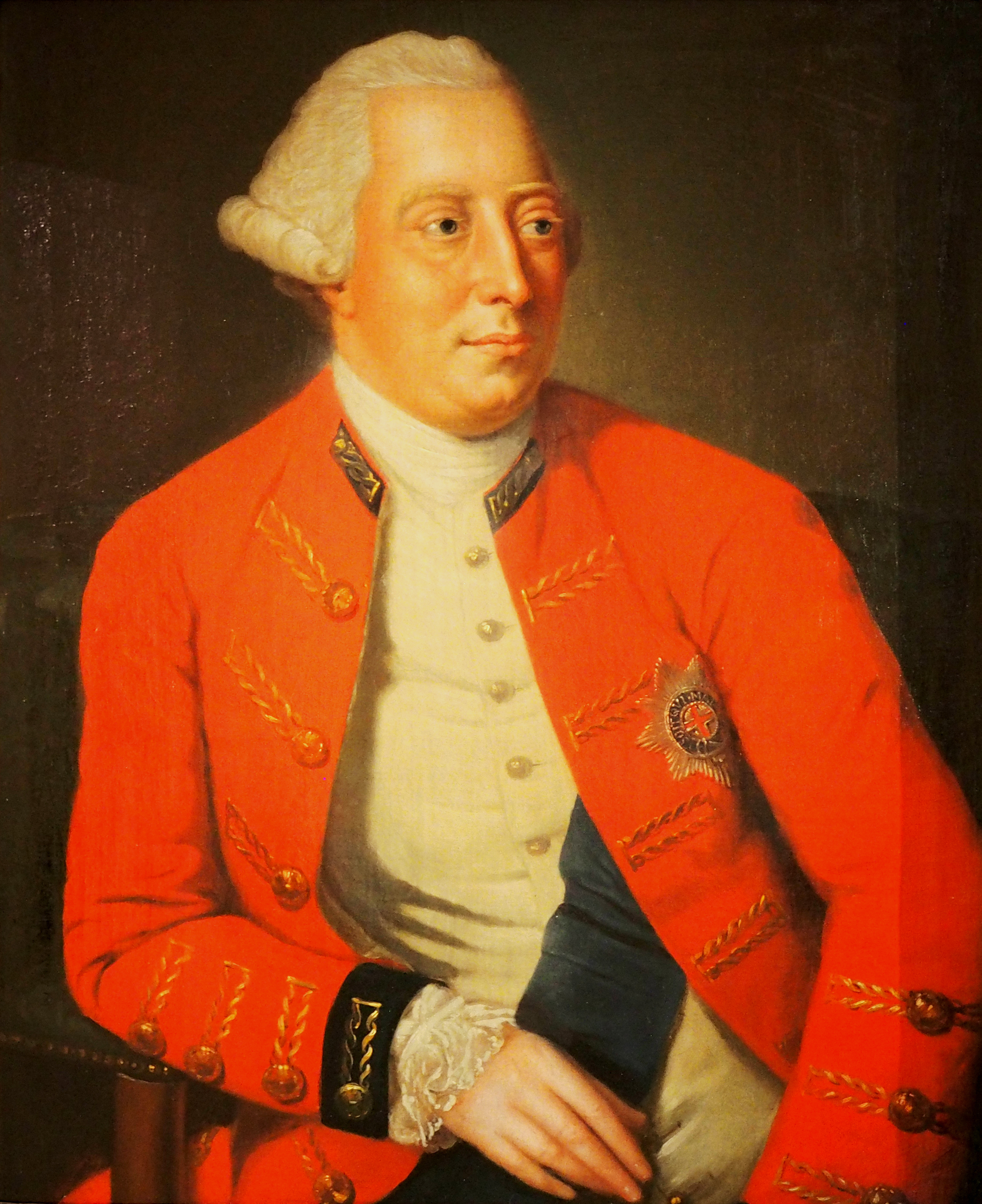
George III in a 1775 portrait

The 27 grievances is a section from the United States Declaration of Independence. The Second Continental Congress's Committee of Five drafted the document listing their grievances with the actions and decisions of King George III with regard to the colonies in North America. The Second Continental Congress voted unanimously to adopt and issue the Declaration of Independence on July 4, 1776.

Historians have noted the similarities between John Locke's works and the context of the grievances. Historical precedents such as Magna Carta and the Bill of Rights of 1689 had established the principle that the King was not to interfere with the Rights of Englishmen held by the people. In the view of the American colonies, the King had opposed the very purpose of governance by opposing laws deemed necessary for the public good.

== Grievance 1 ==
"He has refused his Assent to Laws, the most wholesome and necessary for the public good."

"The Colonial Assemblies, from time to time, made enactments touching their commercial operations, the emission of a colonial currency, and concerning representatives in the imperial Parliament, but the assent of the sovereign to these laws was withheld. After the Stamp-Act excitements, Secretary Conway informed the Americans that the tumults should be overlooked, provided the Assemblies would make provision for full compensation for all public property which had been destroyed. In complying with this demand, the Assembly of Massachusetts stated it would be 'wholesome and necessary for the public good' to grant free pardon to all who had been engaged in the disturbances, and passed an act accordingly. It would have produced quiet and good feeling; but the royal assent was refused."

Self-governance was at the heart of the Founding Fathers' concerns, and each time George III refused to ratify Colonial legislation, he intensified that concern.

== Grievance 2 ==
"He has forbidden his Governors to pass Laws of immediate and pressing importance unless suspended in their operation till his Assent should be obtained; and when so suspended, he has utterly neglected to attend to them."

This is an indictment of the King's appointed governors in the colonies, who had refused to endorse laws colonists viewed as conducive to the public good. The Massachusetts Assembly passed a law in 1770 for taxing Government officers in that colony, but the King ordered the governor to withhold his assent. Thus, the King violated the colonial charter and showed the little power of the colonies.

"Neglect" is one of two reasons mentioned by John Locke as a valid reason for a dissolved government.

== Grievance 3 ==
"He has refused to pass other Laws for the accommodation of large districts of people unless those people would relinquish the right of Representation in the Legislature, a right inestimable to them and formidable to tyrants only."

Chapter 19 of Two Treatises of Government notes that "when such a single person, or prince, sets up his own arbitrary will, in place of the laws, which are the will of the society, declared by the legislative, then the legislative is changed." Locke lists changing the legislature without the people's knowledge or consent as another situation that justifies reform of government.

== Grievance 4 ==
"He has called together legislative bodies at places unusual, and also uncomfortable, and distant from the depository of their Public Records, for the sole purpose of fatiguing them into compliance with his measures."

On May 20, 1774, Parliament passed the Massachusetts Government Act, which nullified the Massachusetts Charter of 1691 and allowed governor Thomas Gage to dissolve the local provincial assembly and force them to meet in Salem instead of Boston.

== Grievance 5 ==
"He has dissolved Representative Houses repeatedly, for opposing with manly firmness his invasions on the rights of the people."

The Massachusetts Assembly issued a circular to other Assemblies in 1768 urging mutual co-operation in asserting the principle that Great Britain had no right to tax the colonists without their consent. The King then demanded that the Assembly rescind the resolutions expressed in the circular, and he ordered the governor to dissolve the Massachusetts Assembly immediately if they refused. Other assemblies were warned by the Government not to imitate Massachusetts, and the King dissolved any that refused to yield to their royally appointed governors. The North Carolina General Assembly and Virginia General Assembly were dissolved for denying the right of the King to tax the colonies or to extradite Americans from the colonies to stand trial. Several assemblies discussed forming a general Congress with delegates from all the colonies in 1774, and the King dissolved nearly all those that entertained the idea. The Virginia House of Burgesses had implemented five resolutions, however, attempted to rescind the fifth on the 31st of May, 1765. As the papers had already printed their implementation, Royal Governor Francis Fauquier dissolved the House for adopting the resolutions.

== Grievance 6 ==
"He has refused for a long time, after such Dissolutions, to cause others to be elected; whereby the Legislative Powers, incapable of Annihilation, have returned to the People at large for their exercise; the State remaining, in the meantime, exposed to all the Dangers of Invasion from without, and convulsions within."

The New York Restraining Act 1767 which suspended the Assembly's legislative authority. John Dickinson discusses the suspension of New York's assembly in Letters from a Farmer in Pennsylvania.

The Assembly of Massachusetts was dissolved in July 1768, and was not permitted to meet again until the last Wednesday of May 1769; even then, they found a military guard surrounding their meeting location with cannons pointed directly at it.

== Grievance 7 ==
"He has endeavored to prevent the population of these States; for that purpose obstructing the Laws for Naturalization of Foreigners; refusing to pass others to encourage their migrations hither, and raising the conditions of new Appropriations of Lands."

There had been a large influx of German immigrants immigrating to America, and the King wanted to discourage such immigration. The Government was concerned over the increasing power of the colonies and the widespread popularity of republican ideals among German immigrants. After the peace of 1763, few people settled west of the Alleghenies due to these restrictions, and immigration had almost ceased by the time of the revolution.

== Grievance 8 ==
"He has obstructed the Administration of Justice by refusing his Assent to Laws for establishing Judiciary Powers."

Parliament deprived the people of Massachusetts the right to elect their judges in 1774. Instead, the King appointed all the colony's judges, and they were dependent on him for their salaries and subject to his directions—and those salaries came from taxes and duties on the colonists. The same act deprived the colonists of the benefit of trial by jury, and the "administration of justice" was obstructed. Other colonies expressed similar grievances concerning the courts of law.

== Grievance 9 ==
"He has made Judges dependent on his Will alone for the tenure of their offices, and the amount and payment of their salaries."

Judges and royally appointed governors did not depend upon the colonists for their income; they drew their salaries from the King, and the American colonists saw that this led their officers to sympathize with Parliament but not with the colonies. The Colonial assemblies protested against these measures, leading to the formation of the Committees of correspondence in 1774.

When Chief Justice Oliver declared it to be his intention to receive his salary from the crown, the Assembly proceeded to impeach him and petitioned Governor Thomas Hutchinson for his removal. The governor refused compliance and great irritation ensued.

== Grievance 10 ==
"He has erected a multitude of New Offices, and sent hither swarms of Officers to harass our people and eat out their substance."

After the passage of the Stamp Act, stamp distributors were appointed in every considerable town. In 1766 and 1767, acts for the collection of duties created "swarms of officers", all of whom received high salaries; and when in 1768, admiralty and vice-admiralty courts were established on a new basis, an increase in the number of officers was made. The high salaries and extensive perquisites of all of these were paid with the people's money, and thus "swarms of officers, ate out their substance."

== Grievance 11 ==
"He has kept among us, in times of peace, Standing Armies without the Consent of our legislatures."

In 1763, Britain and France signed the Treaty of Paris to end the Seven Years' War. Parliament realized they needed to keep a permanent army in the American colonies in order both to keep the French from reasserting their control of their former territories and to prevent open warfare between the colonists and the Native Americans along the frontier. Although the colonists initially welcomed the protection provided by the soldiers by the 1760s and early 1770s they had increasingly come to see the army as a tool for Parliament to enforce various revenue acts—e.g. the Stamp Act and Townshend Acts—that many colonists viewed as illegitimate. The last straw came in 1774 when Parliament passed the Quartering Act in response to the Boston Tea Party. This act allowed army officers to appropriate private property to quarter their troops without the consent of the property's owners. When General Thomas Gage occupied Boston in September 1774, he relied on this act to quarter his troops. It was Gage's military occupation of Boston that led the Second Continental Congress to include this grievance in the Declaration of Independence.

== Grievance 12 ==
"He has affected to render the Military independent of and superior to the Civil Power."

Upon his arrival at Boston in 1774, Thomas Gage – commander-in-chief of the British forces in North America – assumed control of the civil government as royal governor of Massachusetts. Both offices were held by royal appointment and without the approval of the people or the provincial government of Massachusetts. This was done according to the authority of Parliament (see: Massachusetts Government Act) in which the colonies were not represented. The purpose of this arrangement was to enforce the payment of customs, quell insurrection and resistance, and execute punitive measures. The Continental Congress considered that the police power of the state had been removed from accountability to the people of the province or their local, duly-elected leaders and could thus be used despotically to further the unjust policies imposed by the crown.

== Grievance 13 ==
"He has combined with others to subject us to a jurisdiction foreign to our constitution, and unacknowledged by our laws; giving his Assent to their Acts of pretended Legislation:"

The "others" with whom the King is thus said to have combined were the members of Parliament, the existence of which as a legally constituted body possessing authority over them the Americans thus refused even by implication to recognize. This was due to the establishment of a Board of Trade, to act independently of colonial legislation through its creatures (resident commissioners of customs) in the enforcement of revenue laws. This was altogether foreign to the constitution of any of the colonies and produced great indignation. The establishment of this power and the remodelling of the admiralty courts to exclude trial by jury therein, in most cases rendered the government fully obnoxious to the charge in the text. The people felt their degradation under such petty tyranny and resolved to spurn it. It was effectually done in Boston, and the government, after all its bluster, was obliged to recede. In 1774, the members of the council of Massachusetts, were, by a Parliamentary enactment, chosen by the king, to hold the office during his pleasure. Almost unlimited power was also given to the governor, and the people were indeed subjected to "a jurisdiction foreign to their constitution" by these members of royalty.

== Grievance 14 ==
"For quartering large bodies of armed troops among us:"

In 1765, Parliament passed an amendment to the Mutiny Act commonly referred to as the Quartering Act. It allowed soldiers stationed in the colonies to request shelter from any citizen, and created the punishment for refusal.

== Grievance 15 ==
"For protecting them, by a mock Trial from punishment for any Murders which they should commit on the Inhabitants of these States:"

In 1768, two citizens of Annapolis, in Maryland, died in a violent dispute against a group of Marines. The trial was controversial; and in the face of overwhelming evidence against them, the defendants were acquitted.

== Grievance 16 ==
"For cutting off our Trade with all parts of the world".

This refers to the 1774 Boston Port Act, which punished the people of Boston for the Boston Tea Party by closing their port.

== Grievance 17 ==
"For imposing taxes on us without our consent:"

In addition to the revenue taxes imposed from and were attempted to be collected utilizing writs of assistance, the Stamp Act was passed, and duties upon paper, painters' colors, glass, tea, and many other goods, were levied. This worsened tension between the colonists and the government, as most colonists believed that representation was needed as a justification for being taxed, and the Government was continually always trying to pay off debt from the Seven Years' War.

== Grievance 18 ==
"For depriving us in many cases, of the benefit of Trial by Jury:"

After these functionaries were driven from Boston in 1768, an act was passed that placed violations of the revenue laws under the jurisdiction of the admiralty courts, where the offenders were tried, but the prosecutors were biased towards the crown.

== Grievance 19 ==
"For transporting us beyond Seas to be tried for pretended offenses:"

On the fifteenth of April, 1774, Lord North introduced a bill in Parliament, entitled "A bill for the impartial administration of justice in the cases of persons questioned for any acts done by them in the execution of the laws, or for the suppression of riots and tumults in the province of Massachusetts Bay, in New England." This bill, known as the Administration of Justice Act, provided that in case any person indicted for murder in that province, or any other capital offense, or an indictment for riot, the resistance of the magistrate, or impeding the revenue laws in the smallest degree, he might, at the option of the Governor, or, in his absence, of the Lieutenant Governor, be taken to another colony, or transported from the colonies, for trial.

The bill met violent opposition in parliament. The minister seemed to be actuated more by a spirit of retaliation, than by a conviction of the necessity of such a measure. "We must show the Americans," said he, "that we will no longer sit quietly under their insults; and also, that even when roused, our measures are not cruel or vindictive, but necessary and efficacious." Colonel Barre denounced the bill in unmeasured terms. "This," said he, "is indeed the most extraordinary resolution that was ever heard in the Parliament of England. It offers new encouragement to military insolence, already so insupportable".

The text of the bill contained the following:

In that case, it shall and may be lawful for the governor, or lieutenant-governor, to direct, with the advice and consent of the council, that the inquisition, indictment, or appeal, shall be tried in some other of his Majesty's colonies, or Great Britain.

== Grievance 20 ==
"For abolishing the free System of English Laws in a neighboring Province, establishing therein an Arbitrary government, and enlarging its Boundaries to render it at once an example and fit instrument for introducing the same absolute rule into these Colonies:"

This refers to the Quebec Act of 1774 which expanded the use of French civil law in Quebec (as compared to English common law) and expanded Canadian borders into what is now the Midwestern states of the United States.

== Grievance 21 ==
"For taking away our Charters, abolishing our most valuable Laws and altering fundamentally the Forms of our Governments:"

This is a reiteration of a charge already considered, and refers to the alteration of the Massachusetts charter, to make judges and other officers independent of the people, and subservient to the crown. The governor was empowered to remove and appoint all inferior judges, the attorney-generals, provost-marshals, and justices of the peace, and to appoint sheriffs independent of the council. As the sheriffs chose jurors, trial by jury became mostly nonexistent. The people had hitherto been allowed, by their charter, to select jurors; now the entire matter was placed in the hands of the government.

== Grievance 22 ==
"For suspending our own Legislatures, and declaring themselves invested with power to legislate for us in all cases whatsoever".

This, too, is another phase of the charge just considered. Suppression occurred of the Legislature of New York, and in several cases, the governors, after dissolving Colonial Assemblies, assumed the right to make proclamations stand in the place of statute law. Lord Dunmore assumed this right in 1775, and so did Sir James Wright of Georgia, and Lord William Campbell of South Carolina.

== Grievance 23 ==
"He has abdicated Government here, by declaring us out of his Protection and waging War against us."

In his message to Parliament early in 1775, George III declared the colonists to be in a state of open rebellion; and by sending armies to the Americas, he "abdicated government," by thus declaring them no longer under his protection. Shortly after, the Prohibitory Act was passed by Parliament. He sanctioned the acts of governors in employing Native Americans to quell his rebellion, and negotiated the hiring of German soldiers.

John Adams said of the Prohibitory act: "It throws thirteen colonies out of the royal protection, levels all distinctions, and makes us independent in spite of our supplications and entreaties ... It may be fortunate that the act of independency should come from the British Parliament rather than the American Congress."

== Grievance 24 ==
"He has plundered our seas, ravaged our coasts, burnt our towns, and destroyed the lives of our people."

Lord Dunmore ordered the seizure of several American merchant vessels, and several naval assaults were made upon the colonies, disrupting the affected towns.

== Grievance 25 ==
"He is at this time transporting large Armies of foreign Mercenaries to complete the works of death, desolation, and tyranny, already begun with circumstances of Cruelty & Perfidy scarcely paralleled in the most barbarous ages, and unworthy the Head of a civilized nation."

The hiring of German soldiers for use against the Thirteen Colonies was seen as an outrage by the Americans.

== Grievance 26 ==
"He has constrained our fellow Citizens taken Captive on the high Seas to bear Arms against their Country, to become the executioners of their friends and Brethren, or to fall themselves by their Hands."

An act of Parliament, passed toward the close of December 1775, authorized the capture of all American vessels, and also directed the treatment of the crews of armed vessels to be impressed and not kept prisoners of war. This act was condemned on the floor of Parliament as unworthy of a Christian people, and "a refinement of cruelty unknown among savage nations."

== Grievance 27 ==
"He has excited domestic insurrections amongst us, and has endeavored to bring on the inhabitants of our frontiers, the merciless Indian Savages whose known rule of warfare, is an undistinguished destruction of all ages, sexes, and conditions."

This was done in several instances. Dunmore was charged with a design to employ Native Americans ("savages") against the Virginians as early as 1774. Dunmore's Proclamation in November 1775, encouraged a slave rebellion against colonial masters. He was also concerned with Governor Gage and others, and under instructions from the Government Ministry, ordered the Shawnee and other native inhabitants of the Ohio country to fight against the colonists. Emissaries were also sent among the Cherokee and Muscogee for the same purpose; and all of the tribes of the Six Nations, except the Oneida, fought against the colonists when the war began.

== See also ==
- Declaration of Rights and Grievances, a document written by the Stamp Act Congress and passed on October 14, 1765.
- 1768 Petition, Memorial, and Remonstrance
- Declaration and Resolves of the First Continental Congress, a statement adopted by the First Continental Congress on October 14, 1774, in response to the Intolerable Acts.
