= Administration of Justice Act 1774 =

Act of the Parliament of Great Britain

- Act of Parliament
- Parliament of Great Britain
- Long title: An Act for the Impartial Administration of Justice in the Cases of Persons questioned for any Acts done by them in the Execution of the Law, or for the Suppression of Riots and Tumults in the Province of Massachusetts Bay, in New England.
- Citation: 14 Geo. 3 c. 39
- Territorial extent: Great Britain; Province of Massachusetts Bay

Dates
- Royal assent: 20 May 1774
- Commencement: 1 June 1774 (Note: Section 8)
- Expired: 1 June 1777
- Repealed: 21 August 1871
Other legislation
Repealed by	Statute Law Revision Act 1871

Status: Repealed

Text of statute as originally enacted

The Administration of Justice Act 1774 (14 Geo. 3. c. 39), or An Act for the Impartial Administration of Justice, also popularly called the Monkey Act and the Murder Act by George Washington, was an act of the Parliament of Great Britain, and it covered the treatment of British officials in the Massachusetts Bay colony and became law on 20 May 1774.

It was one of several acts (known as the Intolerable Acts) passed by the British government in an effort to keep control of the American colonies.

== History ==
By the early 1770s, many citizens living in the British colonies in America were organizing for independence from the British government.

The act was created in the aftermath of the Boston Tea Party, when the British government was working to regain control of the colony.

The law was one of the measures (commonly referred to as the Intolerable Acts, the Punitive Acts, or the Coercive Acts by many colonists) that was designed to secure Britain's jurisdiction over the American dominions. As such, it is a part of the Grievances of the United States Declaration of Independence.

The act was seen by those in America as a final sign that there would be no further negotiations with the British government in London. The First Continental Congress met four months later and the American Revolutionary War began less than a year after the Act was passed.

== Provisions ==
The Coercive Acts included the Boston Port Act, the Massachusetts Government Act, and the Quebec Act.

The Administration of Justice Act allowed the royally appointed governor to remove any acquisition placed on a royal official by a member of the public, if the governor did not believe the official would have a fair trial. The Act was referred to as the "Murder Act", as the American separatists believed that the official could get away with capital offences.

To ensure that legal trials were more favorable to the Crown than the potential prejudices of local juries, the Act granted a change of venue to another British colony (or to Great Britain) in trials of officials charged with a crime arising from their enforcement of the law or suppression of riots. Witnesses for both sides were also required to attend the trial and were to be compensated for their expenses.

== Subsequent developments ==
Section 8 said the act would remain in force for 3 years. The whole act was repealed by section 1 of, and the schedule to, the Statute Law Revision Act 1871 (34 & 35 Vict. c. 116), which came into force on 21 August 1871.
