= Prohibitory Act =

Act of the Parliament of great Britain during the American Revolutionary War

Prohibitory Act 1775
- Act of Parliament
- Parliament of Great Britain
- Long title: An act to prohibit all trade and inter-courses with the colonies of New Hampshire, Massachuset's Bay, Rhode Island, Connecticut, New York, New Jersey, Pennsylvania, the three lower counties on Delaware, Maryland, Virginia, North Carolina, South Carolina, and Georgia, during the continuance of the present rebellion within the said colonies respectively; for repealing an act, made in the fourteenth year of the reign of his present Majesty, to discontinue the landing and discharging, lading or shipping, of goods, wares, and merchandise, at the town and within the harbor of Boston, in the province of Massachuset's Bay; and also two acts, made in the last session of parliament, for restraining the trade and commerce of the colonies in the said acts respectively mentioned; and to enable any person or persons, appointed and authorised by his Majesty to grant pardons, to issue proclamations, in the cases, and for the purposes therein mentioned.
- Citation: 16 Geo. 3 c. 5
- Territorial extent: Great Britain; British America and the British West Indies

Dates
- Royal assent: 22 December 1775
- Commencement: 26 October 1775 (Note: Start of session.)
- Repealed: 6 August 1861
Other legislation
Amends	Trade Act 1775; Trade (No. 2) Act 1775
Repeals/revokes	Trade Act 1774
Repealed by	Statute Law Revision Act 1861
Relates to	Trade Act 1775; Trade (No. 2) Act 1775

Status: Repealed

Text of statute as originally enacted

The Prohibitory Act 1775 (16 Geo. 3. c. 5) was an act of the Parliament of Great Britain in late 1775 which cut off all British trade with the rebellious Thirteen Colonies and instituted a blockade around the colonies, along with authorizing British vessels to seize colonial ships. In the text of the act, it referenced two acts passed by the last session of Parliament which were known as the Restraining Acts 1775. Issued after the outbreak of the American War of Independence in April 1775 with the Battles of Lexington and Concord, American Patriots responded to the act by issuing letters of marque to privateers, and it was referenced as one of the 27 colonial grievances of the United States Declaration of Independence.

== Provisions ==
In October 1775, the Parliament of Great Britain, under the North ministry, decided that sterner measures would be taken to subdue the rebellion now underway in the Thirteen Colonies. To that end, they decreed a blockade against the colonies' trade by passing the Prohibitory Act. "All manner of trade and commerce" would be prohibited, and any ship that was found trading "shall be forfeited to his Majesty, as if the same were the ships and effects of open enemies." The act's goal was to weaken the colonial economy by cutting of its trade. Amounting to a virtual declaration of war, John Adams regarded the act as the straw that broke the camel's back.

The act served as an effective declaration of war on the colonies since a blockade is an act of war under the law of nations. The colonies and Continental Congress immediately reacted by issuing letters of marque, which authorized individual American shipowners to seize British ships in a practice known as privateering.

At the same time, the British had hired German auxiliary troops known as Hessians, which were being sent to the colonies to suppress the rebellion. They also made overtures to various Indian tribes requesting their support in the conflict. Concluding that they no longer had the king's protection, Patriot colonists responded with the Declaration of Independence.

It throws thirteen colonies out of the royal protection, levels all distinctions, and makes us independent in spite of our supplications and entreaties.... It may be fortunate that the act of independency should come from the British Parliament rather than the American Congress.

— John Adams

== Subsequent developments ==
The whole act was repealed by section 1 of, and the schedule to, the Statute Law Revision Act 1861 (24 & 25 Vict. c. 101), which came into force on 6 August 1861.
