= Erection of Cottages Act 1588 =

Act of the Parliament of England

- Act of Parliament
- Parliament of England
- Long title: An Act against the erecting and maintaining of Cottages.
- Citation: 31 Eliz. 1. c. 7
- Territorial extent: England and Wales

Dates
- Royal assent: 8 March 1589
- Commencement: 29 March 1589 (Note: Section 1. End of session.)
- Repealed: 29 November 1774
Other legislation
Repealed by	Erection of Cottages Act 1775

Status: Repealed

Text of statute as originally enacted

The Erection of Cottages Act 1588 (31 Eliz. 1. c. 7) was an act of the Parliament of England that prohibited the construction—in most parts of England—of any dwelling that did not have at least 4 acres (1.62 ha; 0.01 sq mi) assigned to it out of the freehold or other heritable land belonging to the person responsible for its construction.

== Background ==
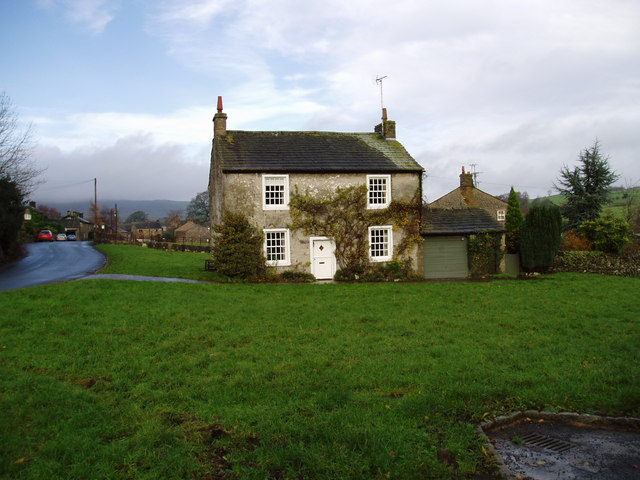
17th Century Squatters' House in Airton.

In the reign of Elizabeth I of England there arose a common belief, that if a house was erected by a squatter and his friends on waste ground overnight, then they had the right of undisturbed possession. The problems caused by the large number of illegally erected cottages, on common land, was explicitly recognised by an act known as the Erection of Cottages Act 1588 (31 Eliz. 1. c. 7, long title "An Act against the erecting and maintaining of Cottages.").

== The act ==
To make it difficult for squatters to build, the act laid down, that a cottage should have minimum of 4 acres (1.62 ha; 0.01 sq mi) of land associated with it:

For the avoiding of the great inconveniencies which are found by experience to grow by the erecting and building of great numbers and multitude of cottages, which are daily more and more increased in many parts of this realm, be it enacted … that … no person shall within this realm … make, build and erect, or cause to be made, built or erected, any manner of cottage for habitation or dwelling, nor convert or ordain any building or housing made or hereafter to be made or used as a cottage for habitation or dwelling, unless the same person do assign and lay to the same cottage or building four acres of ground at the least, to be accounted according to the statute or ordinance De terris mensurandis being his or her own freehold and inheritance lying near to the said cottage, to be continually occupied and manured therewith so long as the same cottage shall be inhabited; upon pain that every such offender shall forfeit, to (the Queen) … £10 of lawful money of England for every such offence

— Basket 1763, p. 664

The act passed into law on 8 March 1589. Exemption from the act could be obtained by petition to the Quarter Sessions on grounds of poverty, provided the permission of the manorial lord was given. Lodgers and the subdivision of houses were not allowed. This was qualified by the Poor Relief Act 1601 which gave churchwardens and overseers authority to build cottages on ‘waste and common’ for the use of the poor, with permission of the manorial lord:

It shall and may be lawful for the said churchwardens and overseers … by the leave of the lord or lords of the manor, whereof any waste or common within their parish is or shall be parcel … according to any order to be set down by the justices of the peace of the said county at their general Quarter Sessions … to erect, build and set up in fit and convenient places of habitation, in such waste or common, at the general charges of the parish … convenient houses of dwelling for the said impotent poor.

— Basket 1763, pp. 702–705

=== Erection of Cottages Act 1775 ===
Erection of Cottages Act 1775
- Act of Parliament
- Parliament of Great Britain
- Long title: An Act to repeal an Act, passed in the Thirty-first Year of the Reign of Her Majesty Queen Elizabeth, intituled, "An Act against the erecting and maintaining of Cottages."
- Citation: 15 Geo. 3. c. 32
- Territorial extent: Great Britain

Dates
- Royal assent: 22 May 1775
- Commencement: 29 November 1774 (Note: Start of session.)
- Repealed: 21 August 1871
Other legislation
Repeals/revokes	Erection of Cottages Act 1588
Repealed by	Statute Law Revision Act 1871

Status: Repealed

Text of statute as originally enacted

The act was repealed by the Erection of Cottages Act 1775 (15 Geo. 3. c. 32) The principal reasons for the repeal were in the preamble, which stated that the 1588 act had made it difficult for poor people to find 'habitation' and also that it may have caused a reduction in the population.

== Bibliography ==
- Basket, Mark (1763). Statutes at Large:From the fifth year of King Edward IV to the end of the reign of Queen Elizabeth etc. Vol.2. London: Mark Basket et al.
- Broad, John (2000). "Housing the rural poor in southern England, 1650-1850". The Agricultural History Review. 48 (2). British Agricultural History Society: 151–170. JSTOR 40275651.
- Harrison, L F C (1989). The Common People, a History from the Norman Conquest to the Present. Glasgow: Fontana. ISBN 0-0068-6163-6.
- House of Lords (1589). "House of Lords Journal Volume 2: 8 March 1589". Journal of the House of Lords: volume 2: 1578-1614. Institute of Historical Research.
- Townsend, George H. (1862). The Manual of Dates: A Dictionary of Reference etc. London: Routledge, Warne and Routledge.
