= List of acts of the Parliament of Great Britain from 1775 =

This is a complete list of acts of the Parliament of Great Britain for the year 1775.

For acts passed until 1707, see the list of acts of the Parliament of England and the list of acts of the Parliament of Scotland. See also the list of acts of the Parliament of Ireland.

For acts passed from 1801 onwards, see the list of acts of the Parliament of the United Kingdom. For acts of the devolved parliaments and assemblies in the United Kingdom, see the list of acts of the Scottish Parliament, the list of acts of the Northern Ireland Assembly, and the list of acts and measures of Senedd Cymru; see also the list of acts of the Parliament of Northern Ireland.

The number shown after each act's title is its chapter number. Acts are cited using this number, preceded by the year(s) of the reign during which the relevant parliamentary session was held; thus the Union with Ireland Act 1800 is cited as "39 & 40 Geo. 3 c. 67", meaning the 67th act passed during the session that started in the 39th year of the reign of George III and which finished in the 40th year of that reign. Note that the modern convention is to use Arabic numerals in citations (thus "41 Geo. 3" rather than "41 Geo. III"). Acts of the last session of the Parliament of Great Britain and the first session of the Parliament of the United Kingdom are both cited as "41 Geo. 3".

Acts passed by the Parliament of Great Britain did not have a short title; however, some of these acts have subsequently been given a short title by acts of the Parliament of the United Kingdom (such as the Short Titles Act 1896).

Before the Acts of Parliament (Commencement) Act 1793 came into force on 8 April 1793, acts passed by the Parliament of Great Britain were deemed to have come into effect on the first day of the session in which they were passed. Because of this, the years given in the list below may in fact be the year before a particular act was passed.

== 15 Geo. 3 ==
The first session of the 14th Parliament of Great Britain, which met from 29 November 1774 until 26 May 1775.

This session was also traditionally cited as 15 G. 3.

=== Public acts ===
Short title	Citation	Royal assent
Long title
Importation Act 1775 (repealed)	15 Geo. 3. c. 1	23 December 1774
An Act to allow the Importation of Indian Corn and Maize, under certain Restrictions. (Repealed by Statute Law Revision Act 1861 (24 & 25 Vict. c. 101))
Malt Duties Act 1775 (repealed)	15 Geo. 3. c. 2	23 December 1774
An Act for continuing and granting to His Majesty certain Duties upon Malt, Mum, Cyder, and Perry, for the Service of the Year One thousand, seven hundred and seventy-five. (Repealed by Statute Law Revision Act 1871 (34 & 35 Vict. c. 116))
Land Tax Act 1775 (repealed)	15 Geo. 3. c. 3	17 February 1775
An Act for granting an Aid to His Majesty by a Land Tax, to be raised in Great Britain, for the Service of the Year One thousand seven hundred and seventy-five. (Repealed by Statute Law Revision Act 1871 (34 & 35 Vict. c. 116))
Marine Mutiny Act 1775 (repealed)	15 Geo. 3. c. 4	17 February 1775
An Act for the Regulation of His Majesty's Marine Forces while on Shore. (Repealed by Statute Law Revision Act 1871 (34 & 35 Vict. c. 116))
Exportation Act 1775 (repealed)	15 Geo. 3. c. 5	17 February 1775
An Act to repeal so much of an Act made in the Fourteenth Year of the Reign of His present Majesty, intituled, "An Act to prevent the Exportation to Foreign Parts of Utensils made use of in the Cotton, Linen, Woollen, and Silk Manufactures of this Kingdom;" (Note: Exportation (No. 5) Act 1774 (14 Geo. 3. c. 71)) as relates to Wool Cards used in the Woollen Manufactures of this Kingdom, intended to be exported to any of His Majesty’s Colonies or Plantations in America. (Repealed by Statute Law Revision Act 1871 (34 & 35 Vict. c. 116))
Mutiny Act 1775 (repealed)	15 Geo. 3. c. 6	24 March 1775
An Act for punishing Mutiny and Desertion, and for the better Payment of the Army and their Quarters. (Repealed by Statute Law Revision Act 1871 (34 & 35 Vict. c. 116))
Importation (No. 2) Act 1775 (repealed)	15 Geo. 3. c. 7	24 March 1775
An Act to continue for a further Time an Act, made in the Eighth Year of His present Majesty's Reign, (Note: Importation Act 1768 (8 Geo. 3. c. 9)) intituled, "An Act to continue and amend an Act, made in the Fifth Year of the Reign of His present Majesty, (Note: Importation Act 1765 (5 Geo. 3. c. 1)) intituled, 'An Act for Importation of Salted Beef, Pork, Bacon, and Butter, from Ireland for a limited Time; and for allowing the Importation of Salted Beef, Pork, Bacon, and Butter, from the British Dominions in America for a limited Time;'" and for extending the Provisions of the said Acts to Potatoes, and all Kinds of Pulse. (Repealed by Statute Law Revision Act 1871 (34 & 35 Vict. c. 116))
Militia Pay Act 1775 (repealed)	15 Geo. 3. c. 8	24 March 1775
An Act for defraying the Charge of the Pay and Cloathing of the Militia, within that Part of Great Britain called England, for One Year, beginning the Twenty-fifth Day of March One thousand seven hundred and seventy-five. (Repealed by Statute Law Revision Act 1871 (34 & 35 Vict. c. 116))
Oxford Canal Act 1775 (repealed)	15 Geo. 3. c. 9	30 March 1775
An Act to amend an Act, made in the Ninth Year of the Reign of His present Majesty, (Note: Oxford Canal Act 1769 (9 Geo. 3. c. 70)) for making and maintaining a Navigable Canal from the Coventry Canal Navigation to the City of Oxford. (Repealed by Oxford Canal Act 1808 (48 Geo. 3. c. iii) and Oxford Canal Navigation Act 1829 (10 Geo. 4. c. xlviii))
Trade Act 1775 or the New England Trade And Fisheries Act 1775 or the New England Restraining Act 1775 (repealed)	15 Geo. 3. c. 10	30 March 1775
An Act to restrain the Trade and Commerce of the Provinces of Massachusetts Bay and New Hampshire, and Colonies of Connecticut, and Rhode Island and Providence Plantation, in North America, to Great Britain, Ireland, and the British Islands in the West Indies; and to prohibit such Provinces and Colonies from carrying on any Fishery on the Banks of Newfoundland, or other Places therein mentioned, under certain Conditions and Limitations. (Repealed by Statute Law Revision Act 1861 (24 & 25 Vict. c. 101))
Thames Conservancy Act 1775 (repealed)	15 Geo. 3. c. 11	30 March 1775
An Act to amend an Act, made in the Eleventh Year of His present Majesty's Reign, (Note: Thames and Isis Navigation Act 1771 (11 Geo. 3. c. 45)) for improving and completing the Navigation of the Rivers Thames and Isis, from the City of London to the Town of Cricklade, in the County of Wilts. (Repealed by Thames Conservancy Act 1894 (57 & 58 Vict. c. clxxxvii))
Bedford Level (Drainage) Act 1775	15 Geo. 3. c. 12	13 April 1775
An Act to enable the Commissioners acting by virtue of an Act, made in the Twenty-seventh Year of the Reign of His Majesty King George the Second, (Note: Bedford Level Act 1754 (27 Geo. 2. c. 19)) for draining and preserving the North Level, Part of the Great Level of the Fens called Bedford Level, and divers Lands adjoining thereto, in the Manor of Crowland; to charge further Taxes upon the said North Level, and the said adjoining Lands.
East and West Flegg (Poor Relief) Act 1775 (repealed)	15 Geo. 3. c. 13	13 April 1775
An Act for the better Relief and Employment of the Poor within the Hundreds of East and West Flegg, in the County of Norfolk. (Repealed by Statute Law (Repeals) Act 2013 (c. 2))
Reeling False or Short Yarn Act 1775 (repealed)	15 Geo. 3. c. 14	13 April 1775
An Act to explain and amend an Act, made in the Fourteenth Year of His present Majesty, (Note: Reeling False or Short Yarn Act 1774 (14 Geo. 3. c. 44)) intituled, "An Act to amend an Act, made in the Twenty-second Year of the Reign of His late Majesty King George the Second, (Note: Frauds by Workmen Act 1748 (22 Geo. 2. c. 27)) intituled, 'An Act for the more effectual preventing of Frauds and Abuses committed by Persons employed in the Manufacture of Hats, and in the Woollen, Linen, Fustian, Cotton, Iron, Leather, Fur, Hemp, Flax, Mohair, and Silk Manufactures; and for preventing unlawful Combinations of Journeymen Dyers and Journeymen Hot Pressers, and of all Persons employed in the said several Manufactures; and for the better Payment of their Wages.'" (Repealed by Summary Jurisdiction Act 1884 (47 & 48 Vict.. c. 43))
Mutiny in America Act 1775 (repealed)	15 Geo. 3. c. 15	13 April 1775
An Act to amend and render more effectual in His Majesty’s Dominions in America an Act, passed in the present Session of Parliament, intituled, "An Act for punishing Mutiny and Desertion, and for the better Payment of the Army and their Quarters," (Note: Mutiny Act 1775 (15 Geo. 3. c. 6)) and for extending the Provisions of the said Act to His Majesty's Marine Forces in America. (Repealed by Statute Law Revision Act 1871 (34 & 35 Vict. c. 116))
Sir Nigel Gresley's Canal Act 1775	15 Geo. 3. c. 16	13 April 1775
An Act to enable Sir Nigel Gresley Baronet, and Nigel Bowyer Gresley Esquire, his Son, to make and maintain a navigable Cut or Canal, from certain Coal Mines in Apedale, to Newcastle under Lyne, in the County of Stafford.
Indemnity Act 1775 (repealed)	15 Geo. 3. c. 17	13 April 1775
An Act to indemnify such Persons as have omitted to qualify themselves for Offices and Employments; and to indemnify Justices of the Peace, or others, who have omitted to register or deliver in their Qualifications within the Time limited by Law, and for giving further Time for those Purposes; and to indemnify Members and Officers in Cities, Corporations, and Borough Towns, whose Admissions have been omitted to be stamped according to Law or, having been stamped, have been lost or mislaid; and for allowing them Time to provide Admissions duly stamped; and to give further Time to such Persons as have omitted to make and file Affidavits of the Execution of Indentures of Clerks to Attornies and Solicitors. (Repealed by Promissory Oaths Act 1871 (34 & 35 Vict. c. 48))
Trade (No. 2) Act 1775 (repealed)	15 Geo. 3. c. 18	13 April 1775
An Act to restrain the Trade and Commerce of the Colonies of New Jersey, Pennsylvania, Maryland, Virginia, and South Carolina, to Great Britain, Ireland, and the British Islands in the West Indies, under certain Conditions and Limitations. (Repealed by Statute Law Revision Act 1861 (24 & 25 Vict. c. 101))
Composition for a Crown Debt Act 1775 (repealed)	15 Geo. 3. c. 19	13 April 1775
An Act to enable the Commissioners for executing the Office of Treasurer of His Majesty’s Exchequer, or the Lord High Treasurer for the Time being, to compound with the Representatives of Hugh Barlow, Herbert Lloyd, and William Skyrme, a Debt due to His Majesty from William Williams deceased. (Repealed by Statute Law Revision Act 1948 (11 & 12 Geo. 6. c. 62))
Trent and Mersey Canal Act 1775 (repealed)	15 Geo. 3. c. 20	13 April 1775
An Act to amend and render more effectual Two Acts, passed in the Sixth (Note: Trent and Mersey Canal Act 1766 (6 Geo. 3. c. 96)) and Tenth (Note: Trent and Mersey Canal Act 1770 (10 Geo. 3. c. 102)) Years of the Reign of His present Majesty, for making a navigable Cut or Canal from the River Trent, at or near Wilden Ferry, in the County of Derby, to the River Mersey, at or near Runcorn Gap. (Repealed by Trent and Mersey Canal Act 1831 (1 Will. 4. c. lv))
Saint Marylebone (Poor Relief) Act 1775 (repealed)	15 Geo. 3. c. 21	13 April 1775
An Act for the better Relief and Employment of the Poor within the Parish of Saint Mary-le-bone, in the County of Middlesex; and for building a Workhouse in the said Parish. (Repealed by Saint Marylebone Improvement Act 1795 (35 Geo. 3. c. 73))
Supreme Court Buildings Act 1775 (repealed)	15 Geo. 3. c. 22	13 April 1775
An Act for vesting Part of the Garden of the Society of Lincoln's Inn, in the County of Middlesex, in the Accountant General of the Court of Chancery, and his Successors, for ever, for the Purpose of erecting thereon Offices for the Accountant General, and for the Register of the said Court. (Repealed by Administration of Justice Act 1965 (c. 2))
Clerkenwell (Poor Relief) Act 1775 (repealed)	15 Geo. 3. c. 23	13 April 1775
An Act for building a Workhouse, and for the better Relief and Employment of the Poor within the Parish of Saint James Clerkenwell, in the County of Middlesex. (Repealed by London Government (Borough of Finsbury) Order in Council 1901 (SR&O 1901/266))
Huntingdon Clergy Charity Act 1775	15 Geo. 3. c. 24	13 April 1775
An Act for incorporating certain Persons for the Relief of poor Widows and Children of Clergymen within the County of Huntingdon.
Hertford Prison Act 1775 (repealed)	15 Geo. 3. c. 25	13 April 1775
An Act for taking down the Common Gaol of the County of Hertford, and for building a new Gaol in a more commodious Situation. (Repealed by Statute Law (Repeals) Act 2008 (c. 12))
Land Tax (Commissioners) Act 1775 (repealed)	15 Geo. 3. c. 26	13 April 1775
An Act for appointing Commissioners for putting in Execution an Act of this Session of Parliament, intituled, "An Act for granting an Aid to His Majesty by a Land Tax to be raised in Great Britain, for the Service of the Year One thousand seven-hundred and Seventy-five." (Note: Land Tax Act 1775 (15 Geo. 3. c. 3)) (Repealed by Statute Law Revision Act 1871 (34 & 35 Vict. c. 116))
Measurement of Coal Wagons, etc. Act 1775 (repealed)	15 Geo. 3. c. 27	22 May 1775
An Act for admeasuring Waggons and other Carriages used in loading Coals on board Ships at the several Ports of this Kingdom, in the same Manner as at the Ports of Newcastle and Sunderland. (Repealed by Statute Law Revision Act 1871 (34 & 35 Vict. c. 116))
Colliers and Salters (Scotland) Act 1775 or the Colliers, etc. (Scotland) Act 1775 (repealed)	15 Geo. 3. c. 28	22 May 1775
An Act for altering, explaining, and amending, several Acts of the Parliament of Scotland, respecting Colliers, Coal-bearers, and Salters. (Repealed by Statute Law Revision Act 1871 (34 & 35 Vict. c. 116))
Clan Gregor (Scotland) Act 1775 (repealed)	15 Geo. 3. c. 29	22 May 1775
An Act to repeal Two Acts, made in the Parliament of Scotland, the Twenty-eighth Day of June One thousand six hundred and thirty-three, intituled, "Act anent the Clan Gregour," (Note: Clan Gregor Act 1633 (c. 30 (S))) and the Fifteenth Day of June One thousand six hundred and ninety-three, intituled, "Act for the Judiciary in the Highlands," (Note: Justiciary Act 1693 (c. 62 (S))) so far as relates to the Mac Gregours; and to revive an Act of the said Parliament of the Twenty-sixth Day of April One thousand six hundred and sixty-one, (Note: Clan Gregor Act 1661 (c. 195 (S))) relative to the People called Mac Gregours. (Repealed by Statute Law Revision Act 1871 (34 & 35 Vict. c. 116))
Weights for Coin in the Mint Act 1775 (repealed)	15 Geo. 3. c. 30	22 May 1775
An Act for allowing the Officer, appointed to mark or stamp the Weights to be made Use of in weighing the Gold and Silver Coin of this Kingdom, in pursuance of an Act, made in the Last Session of Parliament, (Note: Weights for Coin in the Mint Act 1774 (14 Geo. 3. c. 92)) to take certain Fees in the Execution of his Office. (Repealed by Coinage Act 1870 (33 & 34 Vict. c. 10))
Newfoundland Fisheries Act 1775 or Palliser's Act (repealed)	15 Geo. 3. c. 31	26 May 1775
An Act for the Encouragement of the Fisheries carried on from Great Britain, Ireland, and the British Dominions in Europe; and for securing the Return of the Fishermen, Sailors, and others, employed in the said Fisheries, to the Ports thereof, at the End of the Fishing Season. (Repealed by Statute Law Revision Act 1871 (34 & 35 Vict. c. 116))
Erection of Cottages Act 1775 (repealed)	15 Geo. 3. c. 32	22 May 1775
An Act to repeal an Act, passed in the Thirty-first Year of the Reign of Her Majesty Queen Elizabeth, intituled, "An Act against the erecting and maintaining of Cottages." (Note: Erection of Cottages Act 1588 (31 Eliz. 1. c. 7)) (Repealed by Statute Law Revision Act 1871 (34 & 35 Vict. c. 116))
Crown Lands Act 1775 or the Somerset House Act 1775	15 Geo. 3. c. 33	26 May 1775
An Act for settling Buckingham House, with the Appurtenances, upon the Queen, in case She shall survive His Majesty, in lieu of His Majesty's Palace of Somerset House; for enabling the Lords, Commissioners of His Majesty's Treasury to sell and dispose of Ely House in Holborn, and for applying the Money to arise by Sale thereof, together with other Monies, in erecting and establishing Publick Offices in Somerset House; and for embanking certain Parts of the River Thames, lying within the Bounds of the Manor of The Savoy, and for other Purposes therein mentioned.
Customs Act 1775 (repealed)	15 Geo. 3. c. 34	22 May 1775
An Act for encouraging the Manufactures of Rape Oil, and other Vegetable Oils, in this Kingdom, by reducing the Duties on Rape Seed, and other Seeds producing Oil, imported from Ireland and for allowing the from Importation of Rape Cakes for Manure from Ireland to this Kingdom. (Repealed by Statute Law Revision Act 1861 (24 & 25 Vict. c. 101))
Customs (No. 2) Act 1775 (repealed)	15 Geo. 3. c. 35	22 May 1775
An Act to permit the free Importation of Raw Goat Skins into this Kingdom, for a limited Time. (Repealed by Repeal of Acts Concerning Importation (No. 2) Act 1822 (3 Geo. 4. c. 42))
Parliament Act 1775 (repealed)	15 Geo. 3. c. 36	26 May 1775
An Act to explain and amend an Act, made in the Tenth Year of the Reign of His present Majesty, intituled, "An Act to enable the Speaker of the House of Commons to issue his Warrants to make out new Writs for the Choice of Members to serve in Parliament in the Room of such Members as shall die during the Recess of Parliament;" (Note: Recess Elections Act 1770 (10 Geo. 3. c. 41)) and for enabling the Speaker of the House of Commons to make out new Writs for the Choice of Members to serve in Parliament in the Room of such Members as shall, during the Recess of Parliament, become Peers of Great Britain, and be summoned to Parliament; and for suspending the Execution of the said Act, with respect to the Borough of Shaftesbury, in the County of Dorset, during the next Recess of Parliament. (Repealed by Statute Law Revision Act 1861 (24 & 25 Vict. c. 101))
Customs (No. 3) Act 1775 (repealed)	15 Geo. 3. c. 37	22 May 1775
An Act to permit the Importation of painted Earthen Ware, (except Galley Tiles), the Manufacture of Europe, to be sold in Great Britain; and for charging the same with a Duty ad valorem. (Repealed by Statute Law Revision Act 1861 (24 & 25 Vict. c. 101))
Loans or Exchequer Bills Act 1775 (repealed)	15 Geo. 3. c. 38	26 May 1775
An Act for raising a certain Sum of Money, by Loans or Exchequer Bills, for the Service of the Year One thousand seven hundred and seventy-five. (Repealed by Statute Law Revision Act 1871 (34 & 35 Vict. c. 116))
Oaths Act 1775	15 Geo. 3. c. 39	22 May 1775
An Act to empower Justices of the Peace to administer Oaths where any Penalty is to be levied, or Distress to be made in pursuance of any Act of Parliament, wherein the same is not expressly directed.
Canada Act 1775 (repealed)	15 Geo. 3. c. 40	26 May 1775
An Act for amending and explaining an Act, passed in the Fourteenth Year of His Majesty's Reign, intituled, "An Act to establish a Fund towards further defraying the Charges of the Administration of Justice and Support of the Civil Government, within the Province of Quebec in America." (Note: Quebec Finance Act 1774 (14 Geo. 3. c. 88)) (Repealed by Statute Law Revision Act 1871 (34 & 35 Vict. c. 116))
National Debt Act 1775 (repealed)	15 Geo. 3. c. 41	26 May 1775
An Act for redeeming the Sum of One Million of the Capital Stocks of Three Pounds per Centum Annuities, in the Manner and on the Terms therein mentioned; and for establishing a Lottery. (Repealed by Statute Law Revision Act 1870 (33 & 34 Vict. c. 69))
Appropriation Act 1775 (repealed)	15 Geo. 3. c. 42	26 May 1775
An Act for granting to His Majesty a certain Sum of Money out of the Sinking Fund, and for applying certain Monies therein mentioned for the Service of the Year One thousand seven hundred and seventy-five; and for further appropriating the Supplies granted in this Session of Parliament. (Repealed by Statute Law Revision Act 1871 (34 & 35 Vict. c. 116))
Highgate (Streets) Act 1775 (repealed)	15 Geo. 3. c. 43	22 May 1775
An Act for lighting and watching the Hamlet of Highgate, in the County of Middlesex. (Repealed by Local Government Act 1868 (No. 6) (31 & 32 Vict. c. cliii))
East India Company Act 1775 (repealed)	15 Geo. 3. c. 44	22 May 1775
An Act to continue, for a limited Time, so much of an Act, made in the Thirteenth Year of the Reign of His present Majesty, intituled, "An Act for granting to His Majesty a Sum of Money, to be raised by Exchequer Bills, and to be advanced and applied in the Manner and upon the Terms therein mentioned, for the Relief of the United Company of Merchants of England trading to the East Indies," (Note: East India Company (No. 4) Act 1772 (13 Geo. 3. c. 64)) as obliges the said Company to export annually Goods and Merchandizes of the Growth, Product, or Manufacture of Great Britain, to their Settlements in the East Indies, to a certain Value. (Repealed by Statute Law Revision Act 1871 (34 & 35 Vict. c. 116))
Exportation of Army Clothing Act 1775 (repealed)	15 Geo. 3. c. 45	26 May 1775
An Act for allowing the Cloathing and Accoutrements necessary for His Majesty's Forces, paid out of His Majesty's Revenues arising in the Kingdom of Ireland, to be exported from thence to the Places where such Forces are ordered to serve; and for granting a Bounty upon Flax Seed imported into Ireland, for a limited Time. (Repealed by Statute Law Revision Act 1871 (34 & 35 Vict. c. 116))
Tweed Fisheries Act 1775 (repealed)	15 Geo. 3. c. 46	22 May 1775
An Act for amending and rendering more effectual an Act, passed in the Eleventh Year of His present Majesty's Reign, (Note: Tweed Fisheries Act 1771 (11 Geo. 3. c. 27)) intituled, "An Act for regulating and improving the Fisheries in the River Tweed, and the Rivers and Streams running into the same, and also within the Mouth or Entrance of the said River." (Repealed by River Tweed Fisheries Act 1830 (11 Geo. 4 & 1 Will. 4. c. liv))
Manchester Theatre Act 1775 (repealed)	15 Geo. 3. c. 47	22 May 1775
An Act for enabling His Majesty to license a Play House in the Town of Manchester, in the County Palatine of Lancaster. (Repealed by Statute Law Revision Act 1948 (11 & 12 Geo. 6. c. 62))
Anstruther Easter Beer Duties Act 1775 (repealed)	15 Geo. 3. c. 48	22 May 1775
An Act to continue the Term of an Act, made in the Twenty-second Year of the Reign of His late Majesty King George the Second, (Note: Anstruther Easter Beer Duties Act 1748 (22 Geo. 2. c. 10)) for laying a Duty of Two Pennies Scots upon every Scots Pint of Beer and Ale which shall be sold or vended, brewed, brought in, or tapped, for Sale, within the Town of Anstruther Easter, and Liberties thereof. (Repealed by Statute Law Revision Act 1948 (11 & 12 Geo. 6. c. 62))
Fulbourne Church Act 1775	15 Geo. 3. c. 49	22 May 1775
An Act for taking down the Church of All Saints, in the Town of Fulbourne, and County of Cambridge; and for the better repairing, and keeping in Repair, the Church of Saint Vigors, in the said Town.
Saint Paul, Covent Garden (Poor Relief) Act 1775 (repealed)	15 Geo. 3. c. 50	22 May 1775
An Act to enable the Inhabitants of the Parish of Saint Paul Covent Garden, in the County of Middlesex, to purchase or hire a convenient Piece of Ground, for the Purpose of erecting a Work-house thereon for the Reception and Employment of the Poor of the said Parish; and for providing an additional Burial Ground for the Use of the said Parish. (Repealed by Parish of St. Paul Covent Garden Act 1829 (10 Geo. 4. c. lxviii))
Negotiations of Notes and Bills Act 1775 (repealed)	15 Geo. 3. c. 51	22 May 1775
An Act to restrain the Negotiation of Promissory Notes and Inland Bills of Exchange under a limited Sum, within that Part of Great Britain called England. (Repealed by Bill of Exchange Act 1808 (48 Geo. 3. c. 88))
Porcelain Patent Act 1775 (repealed)	15 Geo. 3. c. 52	26 May 1775
An Act for enlarging the Term of Letters Patent granted by His present Majesty to William Cookworthy, (Note: William Cookworthy.) of Plymouth, Chymist, for the sole Use and Exercise of a Discovery of certain Materials for making Porcelain, in order to enable Richard Champion, of Bristol, (Note: Richard Champion of Bristol.) Merchant, (to whom the said Letters Patent have been assigned), to carry the said Discovery into effectual Execution for the Benefit of the Publick. (Repealed by Statute Law (Repeals) Act 1986 (c. 12))
Copyright Act 1775 (repealed)	15 Geo. 3. c. 53	22 May 1775
An Act for enabling the Two Universities in England, the Four Universities in Scotland, and the several Colleges of Eton, Westminster, and Winchester, to hold in Perpetuity their Copy Right in Books given or bequeathed to the said Universities and Colleges, for the Advancement of useful Learning, and other Purposes of Education; and for amending so much of an Act of the Eighth Year of the Reign of Queen Anne, (Note: Copyright Act 1709 (8 Ann. c. 21)) as relates to the Delivery of Books to the Ware House-keeper of the Stationers Company, for the Use of the several Libraries therein mentioned. (Repealed by Copyright Act 1911 (1 & 2 Geo. 5. c. 46))
London (Streets) Act 1775 (repealed)	15 Geo. 3. c. 54	22 May 1775
An Act for paving and regulating, and for preventing Nuisances and Obstructions, within New Gravel Lane, and the several Streets, Lanes, Passages, and Places, within the Parish of Saint Paul Shadwell, in the County of Middlesex, not comprised in an Act, passed in the Eleventh Year of His present Majesty's Reign, (Note: Saint Botolph, Aldgate (Streets) Act 1771 (11 Geo. 3. c. 23)) for paving and regulating Rosemary Lane, and the other Places therein mentioned. (Repealed by St. Paul Shadwell Poor Relief and Improvement Act 1810 (50 Geo. 3. c. ccviii))
Shoreditch (Poor Relief) Act 1775 (repealed)	15 Geo. 3. c. 55	26 May 1775
An Act to explain and amend an Act, passed in the Fourteenth Year of His present Majesty's Reign, intituled, "An Act for the better Relief and Employment of the Poor within the Parish of Saint Leonard, Shoreditch, in the County of Middlesex, and for building a Work-house; and for purchasing a Piece of Land for a Burial Ground for the Use of the said Parish." (Note: Shoreditch (Poor Relief) Act 1774 (14 Geo. 3. c. 29)) (Repealed by St. Leonard Shoreditch Improvement Act 1813 (53 Geo. 3. c. cxii))
Supreme Court Buildings (No. 2) Act 1775 (repealed)	15 Geo. 3. c. 56	26 May 1775
An Act for applying the Funds provided for rebuilding the Offices of the Six Clerks of the King's Court of Chancery, by an Act made in the Fourteenth Year of the Reign of His present Majesty, intituled, "An Act for rebuilding the Office of the Six Clerks of the King's Court of Chancery, and for erecting Offices for the Register and Accountant General of the said Court, for the better preserving the Records, Decrees, Orders, and Books of Account kept in such Offices;" (Note: Court of Chancery Act 1774 (14 Geo. 3. c. 43)) in building Offices for the said Six Clerks in the Garden of Lincoln's Inn, instead of rebuilding the present Six Clerks Office in Chancery Lane; and for other Purposes. (Repealed by Administration of Justice Act 1965 (c. 2))
Piccadilly (Watering) Act 1775 (repealed)	15 Geo. 3. c. 57	22 May 1775
An Act for watering Piccadilly from the End of Berkeley Street to Hyde Park Gate, in the Parish of Saint George, Hanover Square, in the County of Middlesex. (Repealed by Statute Law Revision Act 1948 (11 & 12 Geo. 6. c. 62))
Hampstead (Streets) Act 1775 (repealed)	15 Geo. 3. c. 58	22 May 1775
An Act for lighting the Streets, Lanes, Roads, and Public Passages, within the Town of Hampstead, and Parts adjacent, within the Parish of Hampstead, in the County of Middlesex; and for establishing a Nightly Watch therein, and a Patrole between the said Town and London. (Repealed by London Government (Borough of Hampstead) Order in Council 1901 (SR&O 1901/217))
Mitford and Launditch, Norfolk (Poor Relief) Act 1775 (repealed)	15 Geo. 3. c. 59	22 May 1775
An Act for the better Relief and Employment of the Poor within the Hundreds of Mitford and Launditch, in the County of Norfolk. (Repealed by Mitford and Launditch Poor Relief Act 1801 (41 Geo. 3 (U.K.) c. lxiii) and Statute Law (Repeals) Act 2013 (c. 2))
Port Glasgow (Improvement) Act 1775 (repealed)	15 Geo. 3. c. 60	22 May 1775
An Act for extending the Duty of Two Pennies Scots, or One Sixth Part of a Penny Sterling, payable on every Pint of Ale and Beer vended or sold in the Village of Port Glasgow, and the Privileges thereof, over the Town of Newark; for supplying the Inhabitants of Port Glasgow and Newark with fresh Water; for paving, cleaning, lighting, and watching, the Streets of the said Two Towns; for erecting Public Markets therein; for repairing and keeping in Repair the Breast and East and West Quays of the Harbour of Port Glasgow; and other Purposes therein mentioned. (Repealed by Port-Glasgow Police Act 1865 (28 & 29 Vict. c. ccliv))
James Watt's Fire Engines Patent Act 1775 (repealed)	15 Geo. 3. c. 61	22 May 1775
An Act for vesting in James Watt Engineer, his Executors, Administrators, and Assigns, the sole Use and Property of certain Steam Engines, commonly called Fire Engines, of his Invention, described in the said Act, throughout His Majesty's Dominions, for a limited Time. (Repealed by Statute Law Revision Act 1948 (11 & 12 Geo. 6. c. 62))
Mevagissey Pier Act 1775 (repealed)	15 Geo. 3. c. 62	22 May 1775
An Act for completing and maintaining the Pier at the Town of Mevagssey, in the County of Cornwall. (Repealed by Pier and Harbour Orders Confirmation Act 1865 (No. 3) (28 & 29 Vict. c. 76))
Argyll Roads and Bridges Act 1775 (repealed)	15 Geo. 3. c. 63	13 April 1775
An Act for repairing the Highways and Bridges in the Shire of Argyll. (Repealed by Argyllshire and Dumbartonshire Roads, Bridges and Quays Act 1816 (56 Geo. 3. c. lxx))
Elloe, Lincoln (Small Debts) Act 1775 (repealed)	15 Geo. 3. c. 64	22 May 1775
An Act for the more easy and speedy Recovery of Small Debts within the Hundred of Elloe, in the County of Lincoln. (Repealed by County Courts Act 1846 (9 & 10 Vict. c. 95))
Fen Drainage Act 1775	15 Geo. 3. c. 65	22 May 1775
An Act for draining and preserving certain Fen Lands, Low Grounds, and Commons, in the several Parishes of Ramsey, Bury, Wistow, Warboys, Somersham, Colne, and Pidley with Fenton, in the County of Huntingdon, and in the Parishes of Chatteris and Doddington, within the Isle of Ely, in the County of Cambridge.
Isle of Ely, etc., (Drainage) Act 1775	15 Geo. 3. c. 66	22 May 1775
An Act for draining and preserving certain Lands and Grounds, in the Parishes of Wisbech Saint Peter's and Wisbech Saint Mary's, and in the Hamlets of Wisbech Murrow and Wisbech Guyhirn, in the Isle of Ely, and County of Cambridge.
Yarmouth to Gorleston Road Act 1775 (repealed)	15 Geo. 3. c. 67	24 March 1775
An Act for amending and widening the Road leading from Yarmouth Bridge, through the Hamlet of South Town, other wife Little Yarmouth, to Gorleston, in the County of Suffolk. (Repealed by Yarmouth Bridge and Gorleston Road (Suffolk) Act 1834 (4 & 5 Will. 4. c. xxix))
Newmarket to Cambridge Road Act 1775 (repealed)	15 Geo. 3. c. 68	30 March 1775
An Act for enlarging the Term and Powers granted in an Act, made in the Third Year of His present Majesty's Reign, (Note: Newmarket and Cambridge Road Act 1763 (3 Geo. 3. c. 32)) for repairing the Road from Newmarket over Newmarket Heath, to the Turnpike Road leading to Stump Cross, in the Counties of Cambridge and Suffolk; for repairing the Road branching out of and leading from the aforesaid Road near the Devil's Ditch, on Newmarket Heath, to join the present Turnpike Road which leads to Cambridge; and for repairing the Highway through the Town of Newmarket, to the present Turnpike Road from thence to Thetford. (Repealed by Newmarket Heath Road Act 1829 (10 Geo. 4. c. liii))
Holyhead Roads Act 1775 (repealed)	15 Geo. 3. c. 69	13 April 1775
An Act for continuing and enlarging the Term and Powers of an Act, made in the Fifth Year of the Reign of His present Majesty, intituled, "An Act for repairing and widening the Road leading from Porthaethwy Ferry (Note: The Porthaethwy Ferry crossed the Menai Straights, and landed at the Porth y Wrach slipway in what is now known as Menai Bridge. 53°13′26″N 4°09′41″W) to Holyhead, in the County of Anglesey." (Note: Anglesey Roads Act 1765 (5 Geo. 3. c. 56)) (Repealed by Roads Between London and Holyhead Act 1819 (59 Geo. 3. c. 48))
Beaconsfield and Stokenchurch Road Act 1775 (repealed)	15 Geo. 3. c. 70	22 May 1775
An Act to enlarge the Term and Powers of several Acts, (Note: Beaconsfield and Stokenchurch Road Act 1718 (5 Geo. 1. c. 2 Pr.)) (Note: Beaconsfield and Stokenchurch Road Act 1735 (9 Geo. 2. c. 11)) (Note: Beaconsfield and Stokenchurch Road Act 1759 (33 Geo. 2. c. 37)) for repairing the Road from Beaconsfield, in the County of Bucks, to Stokenchurch, in the County of Oxford. (Repealed by Beaconsfield and Stokenchurch Road Act 1823 (4 Geo. 4. c. cviii))
Peebles Roads Act 1775 (repealed)	15 Geo. 3. c. 71	22 May 1775
An Act to continue the Term of an Act, made in the Twenty-sixth Year of the Reign of His late Majesty King George the Second, (Note: Peebles Road Act 1753 (26 Geo. 2. c. 93)) for repairing and widening the several Roads in the County of Peebles, leading from Tweed's Cross towards the City of Edinburgh, by Blythe Bridge, La Mancha, and Whom, and by Linton and Carlops, and from Ingleston, through Carlops, until all the said Roads join the Limits of the County of Edinburgh. (Repealed by Roads in Peebles Act 1809 (49 Geo. 3. c. xxxvi))
Bedford and Hereford Roads Act 1775 (repealed)	15 Geo. 3. c. 72	22 May 1775
An Act for continuing and making more effectual several Acts of Parliament, for repairing the Roads from Luton, in the County of Bedford, to Westwood Gate, in the said County, and from Luton to Saint Albans, in the County of Hertford. (Repealed by Maulden Wood Corner and Westwood Gate Road (Bedfordshire) Act 1838 (1 & 2 Vict. c. xlix) and Luton District Road Act 1856 (19 & 20 Vict. c. cviii))
Old Stratford to Dunchurch Road Act 1775 (repealed)	15 Geo. 3. c. 73	22 May 1775
An Act to enlarge the Term of several Acts, passed in the Sixth Year of the Reign of Queen Anne, (Note: Old Stratford to Dunchurch Road Act 1707 (6 Ann. c. 77)) the Eleventh Year of the Reign of King George the First, (Note: Old Stratford to Dunchurch Road Act 1724 (11 Geo. 1. c. 25)) and the Tenth, (Note: Old Stratford to Dunchurch Road Act 1736 (10 Geo. 2. c. 11)) Thirteenth, (Note: Old Stratford to Dunchurch Road Act 1739 (13 Geo. 2. c. 5)) and Thirty-first (Note: Old Stratford to Dunchurch Road Act 1757 (31 Geo. 2. c. 57)) Years of the Reign of His late Majesty King George the Second, for repairing the Highways from Old Stratford, (Note: Old Stratford, Northamptonshire. 52°03′48″N 0°51′53″W) in the County of Northampton, to Dunchurch, (Note: Dunchurch, Warwickshire. 52°20′13″N 1°17′23″W) in the County of Warwick; and for more effectually amending the said Highways. (Repealed by Old Stratford and Dunchurch Road Act 1822 (3 Geo. 4. c. xci), Annual Turnpike Acts Continuance Act 1875 (38 & 39 Vict. c. cxciv) and Statute Law (Repeals) Act 2013 (c. 2))

=== Private acts ===
Short title	Citation	Royal assent
Long title
Suwe's Naturalization Act 1775	15 Geo. 3. c. 1 Pr.	23 December 1774
An Act for naturalizing Jacob Henry Suwe.
Flintham Inclosure Act 1775	15 Geo. 3. c. 2 Pr.	17 February 1775
An Act for dividing and enclosing the Open Arable Fields, Open Meadows, Common Pastures, Common Grounds, and Waste Grounds, within the Parish of Flintham, in the County of Nottingham.
Southwell Inclosure Act 1775	15 Geo. 3. c. 3 Pr.	17 February 1775
An Act for dividing and enclosing the Open Fields, Meadows, and Common Pastures, within the District of Normanton, in the Parish of Southwell, in the County of Nottingham; and also the Open Meadow, called Cow Meadow, in the said Parish of Southwell.
Burcot and Dorchester (Oxfordshire) Inclosure Act 1775	15 Geo. 3. c. 4 Pr.	17 February 1775
An Act for dividing and enclosing the Open Common Fields, Meadows, Pastures, and other Common Lands, within the Hamlet of Burcot and Parish of Dorchester, in the County of Oxford.
Lidlington Inclosure Act 1775	15 Geo. 3. c. 5 Pr.	17 February 1775
An Act for dividing and enclosing the Open and Common Fields, Common Meadows, Common Pastures, and other Commonable Lands and Grounds, in the Manor and Parish of Lidlington, in the County of Bedford.
Styth's Name Act 1775	15 Geo. 3. c. 6 Pr.	17 February 1775
An Act to enable James Greenalgh, heretofore called James Styth, and his Issue, to take and use the Surname of Greenalgh, pursuant to the Will of William Greenalgh deceased.
De Hahn's Naturalization Act 1775	15 Geo. 3. c. 7 Pr.	17 February 1775
An Act for naturalizing George Ernst de Hahn.
Whichcote's Estate Act 1775	15 Geo. 3. c. 8 Pr.	24 March 1775
An Act for vesting the Estate of Christopher Whichcote Esquire and Jane his Wife, situate in the County of Wilts, entailed by the Will of Francis Tregagle Esquire, deceased, in Trustees, to be sold, and for applying the Monies arising by such ale in discharging the Incumbrance therein mentioned; and for laying out the Remainder in the Purchase of other Lands and Hereditaments, to be settled to the same Uses.
Northcote's Estate Act 1775	15 Geo. 3. c. 9 Pr.	24 March 1775
An Act to enable certain Trustees named in the Settlement of Sir Stafford Northcote Baronet, deceased, to raise a competent Sum of Money, by Way of Mortgage, of Part of the Hereditaments comprised in such Settlement, to be applied in completing the Purchase of an undivided Moiety, or Half Part, of the Manor of Iddesley, in the County of Devon, to be settled to the same Uses and for the like Purposes as the other undivided Moiety of the same Manor stands limited and charged by the Settlement; and Will of the said Sir Stafford Northcote.
Maynow's Estate Act 1775	15 Geo. 3. c. 10 Pr.	24 March 1775
An Act for vesting Part of the settled Estates of Philip Wynell Mayow Esquire, in Ashbrenton, alias Ashprington, in Devon, in Trustees, to be sold; and settling other Estates of greater Value in lieu thereof.
Raynesford's Estate Act 1775	15 Geo. 3. c. 11 Pr.	24 March 1775
An Act for vesting certain Estates and Chattels devised by the Will of Richard Raynsford Esquire, deceased, and Part of certain Estates comprised in a Settlement made on the Marriage of Richard Raynsford the younger, Esquire, in Trustees, to sell the same, and for applying the Money to arise by such Sale, in such Manner as in the said Act mentioned.
Goodmanham Inclosure Act 1775	15 Geo. 3. c. 12 Pr.	24 March 1775
An Act for dividing and enclosing the Open Fields, and a Parcel of Common or Waste Ground, in the Manors of Goodmanham, in the County of York.
Rigton Inclosure Act 1775	15 Geo. 3. c. 13 Pr.	24 March 1775
An Act for dividing, enclosing, and improving, certain Commons, Lands, and Grounds in the Township of Rigton, in the Parish of Kirkby Overblow, in the County of York, and for other Purposes therein mentioned.
Mendip Forest Inclosure Act 1775	15 Geo. 3. c. 14 Pr.	24 March 1775
An Act for dividing and enclosing a large Open and uncultivated Common or Tract of Ground, Parcel of the Forest of Mendip, situate within the Parishes of Doulting and Stoke Saint Michael, otherwise Stoke Lane, in the County of Somerset.
Potterspury and Cosgrave (Northamptonshire) Inclosures Act 1775	15 Geo. 3. c. 15 Pr.	24 March 1775
An Act for dividing and enclosing the Open and Common Fields, Common Meadows, Common Pastures, Common Grounds, and Commonable Lands, in the Parish of Potterspury and Hamlet of Tardley Gobyon, in the said Parish of Potterspury; and also a Parcel of Land called Kenson Field, in the Parish of Cosgrave in the County of Northampton.
Hanmer Inclosure Act 1775	15 Geo. 3. c. 16 Pr.	24 March 1775
An Act for dividing and enclosing the Wastes, Mosses, Heaths, and Commons, in the Parish of Hanmer, in the County of Flint.
Fulletby Inclosure Act 1775	15 Geo. 3. c. 17 Pr.	24 March 1775
An Act for dividing and enclosing the Open Fields, Ings, Meadows, Common Pastures, and other Commonable Lands, within the Parish of Fulletby, in the County of Lincoln.
Plomer's Name Act 1775	15 Geo. 3. c. 18 Pr.	24 March 1775
An Act to enable John Clarke Esquire, (heretofore called John Plomer), and the Heirs Male of his Body, to take and bear the Surname and Arms of Clarke, pursuant to the Will of Richard Clarke Esquire, deceased.
Bigot's Naturalization Act 1775	15 Geo. 3. c. 19 Pr.	24 March 1775
An Act for naturalizing Charles Bigot.
Jouenne's Naturalization Act 1775	15 Geo. 3. c. 20 Pr.	24 March 1775
An Act for naturalizing Louis Jouenne.
Wolf's Estate Act 1775	15 Geo. 3. c. 21 Pr.	30 March 1775
An Act for vesting divers Manors, Lands, and Hereditaments, in the County of Southampton, the Settled Estate of Sir Jacob Wolff Baronet, in Trustees, to be conveyed to a Purchaser thereof; and for laying out the Money arising by such Sale in the Purchase of other Estates to be settled to the same Uses.
Bishop Norton Inclosure Act 1775	15 Geo. 3. c. 22 Pr.	30 March 1775
An Act for declaring certain Lands allotted to John Harrison Esquire, in the Parish of Bishop Norton, in the County of Lincoln, to be Copyhold and Freehold respectively, pursuant to the Award of the Commissioners appointed by an Act of Parliament of the Eleventh Year of the Reign of His present Majesty, (Note: Bishop Norton Inclosure Act 1771 (11 Geo. 3. c. 91 Pr.)) for dividing and enclosing certain Open Fields, Lands, and Grounds, in the Township and Parish of Bishop Norton, in the County of Lincoln.
Scrooby Inclosure Act 1775	15 Geo. 3. c. 23 Pr.	30 March 1775
An Act for dividing and enclosing the Open Arable Fields, Meadows, Pastures, Commons, and Waste Grounds, in the Township and Parish of Scrooby, in the County of Nottingham.
Scaldwell Inclosure Act 1775	15 Geo. 3. c. 24 Pr.	30 March 1775
An Act for dividing and enclosing the Open and Common Fields, Common Pastures, Common Meadows, and other Commonable Lands and Grounds, within the Parish of Scaldwell, in the County of Northampton.
Wolverley Inclosure Act 1775	15 Geo. 3. c. 25 Pr.	30 March 1775
An Act for dividing, enclosing, and allotting the several Commons and Waste Lands, within the Manor and Parish of Wolverley, in the County of Worcester.
Henry's Naturalization Act 1775	15 Geo. 3. c. 26 Pr.	30 March 1775
An Act for naturalizing Daniel Henry Rucker.
Exchanging Hinton Mertell or Martell (Dorset) church advowson belonging to the King, for Fringford or Ferringford (Oxfordshire) church advowson belonging to Mary Countess of Shaftesbury.	15 Geo. 3. c. 27 Pr.	13 April 1775
An Act for exchanging the Advowson of the Church of Hunton Mertell, otherwise Hinton Martell, in the County of Dorset, belonging to His Majesty, for the Advowson of the Church of Fringford, otherwise Ferringford, in the County of Oxford, belonging to the Right Honourable Mary Countess Dowager of Shaftesbury.
Viscount Torrington's Estate Act 1775	15 Geo. 3. c. 28 Pr.	13 April 1775
An Act for exchanging certain Lands and Tenements, Part of the Estates comprised in the Settlement made on the Marriage of the Right Honourable George Lord Viscount Torrington, for certain Lands and Tenements belonging to the President and Scholars of Saint John Baptist College, in the University of Oxford; and also for exchanging certain Mills and Lands thereto belonging, likewise comprised in the said Settlement, for certain Lands and Tenements belonging to John Dilly Gentleman.
William Lambert's estate: lease of lands to Lord Edward Smith Stanley in Woodmanstern (Surrey).	15 Geo. 3. c. 29 Pr.	13 April 1775
An Act to confirm a Lease made by William Lambert, an infant, with the Consent of his Guardians, to the Right Honourable Edward Smith Stanley, commonly called Lord Stanley, of Lands in the Parish of Woodmanstern, in the County of Surrey.
Enabling Reverend John Blackburn, vicar of Boffall (Yorkshire) to exchange lands in Yorkshire with Henry Brewster Darley.	15 Geo. 3. c. 30 Pr.	13 April 1775
An Act to enable the Reverend John Blackburn, Vicar of the Parish and Parish Church of Bossall, in the County of York, to make and establish an Exchange of certain Messuages, Tenements, Lands, and Hereditaments, in the said County of York, for other Lands and Hereditaments in the same County belonging to Henry Brewster Darley Esquire.
Exchange of lands between trustees of a charity estate at Hanwell (Middlesex) and William and Henry Bernes.	15 Geo. 3. c. 31 Pr.	13 April 1775
An Act to exchange Lands between the Trustees of a certain Charity Estate at Hanwell, in the County of Middlesex, and William and Henry Berners Esquires.
Parker's Estate Act 1775	15 Geo. 3. c. 32 Pr.	13 April 1775
An Act for effecting an Exchange between John Parker and Montagu Edmund Parker Esquires, of Parts of their Settled Estates in the County of Devon; and for other Purposes therein mentioned.
Stone's Estate Act 1775	15 Geo. 3. c. 33 Pr.	13 April 1775
An Act for vesting several Messuages, Lands, and Hereditaments, in the County of Devon, and City of Exeter, late the Estate of Robert Stone Gentleman, deceased, in Trustees, to enable them to convey the same to the Purchasers thereof; and to apply the Money arising by such Sale in Payment of the Debts of the said Robert Stone, pursuant to a Decree of the Court of Chancery.
Widdrington's Estate Act 1775	15 Geo. 3. c. 34 Pr.	13 April 1775
An Act for vesting in Trustees several Messuages, Lands, Tenements, and Hereditaments, in the Parishes of Arthuret and Kirk Andrews, in the County of Cumberland, Part of the Estate of Catherine Widdrington, commonly called Catherine Lady Widdrington, deceased, for a Term of Five hundred Years, for raising and paying certain Sums of Money to the Reverend Robert Graham Clerk; and for other Purposes therein mentioned.
Cranford Inclosure Act 1775	15 Geo. 3. c. 35 Pr.	13 April 1775
An Act for dividing and enclosing certain Common and Open Fields and Meadows, in the Parish of Cranford, in the County of Northampton.
Cleeve Prior Inclosure Act 1775	15 Geo. 3. c. 36 Pr.	13 April 1775
An Act for dividing and enclosing the Open and Common Fields, and all other Commonable Land, within the Parish of Cleeve Prior, in the County of Worcester.
Bengworth Inclosure Act 1775	15 Geo. 3. c. 37 Pr.	13 April 1775
An Act for dividing and enclosing the Open and Common Fields, and other Commonable Lands, within the Parish of Bengworth, in the County of Worcester.
Pinvin Inclosure Act 1775	15 Geo. 3. c. 38 Pr.	13 April 1775
An Act for dividing and enclosing the Open and Common Fields, and all other Commonable Land, within the Precincts of the Chapelry or Township of Pinvin, in the County of Worcester.
Adlestrop Inclosure Act 1775	15 Geo. 3. c. 39 Pr.	13 April 1775
An Act to confirm and establish an Agreement and Award for dividing and enclosing the Common Fields, and other Commonable Lands and Grounds, within the Manor of Adlestrop, in the County of Gloucester.
Broadwell and Filkins (Oxfordshire) Inclosure Act 1775	15 Geo. 3. c. 40 Pr.	13 April 1775
An Act for dividing, allotting, and enclosing, the Open and Common Fields, Common Meadows, Common Pastures, and all other the Commonable Grounds, in the Hamlets or Tythings of Broadwell and Filkins, in the Manor and Parish of Broadwell, otherwise Broadwell Saint John, in the County of Oxford.
Great Rollright Inclosure Act 1775	15 Geo. 3. c. 41 Pr.	13 April 1775
An Act for dividing and enclosing the Open and Common Fields, Common Meadows, Common Pastures, Commonable Closes, Common Grounds, Heath and Waste Grounds, within the Manor and Parish of Great Rolewright, in the County of Oxford.
Spitta's Naturalization Act 1775	15 Geo. 3. c. 42 Pr.	13 April 1775
An Act for naturalizing Charles Louis Spitta.
Aubery's Naturalization Act 1775	15 Geo. 3. c. 43 Pr.	13 April 1775
An Act for naturalizing John Peter Aubery.
Enabling John Duke of Argyll to sell rights of servitude over lands in Argyll belonging to Hugh Seton and Sir James Campbell.	15 Geo. 3. c. 44 Pr.	22 May 1775
An Act to enable John Duke of Argyll to sell certain Rights of Servitude over Lands in the County of Argyll, belonging in Property to Hugh Seton Esquire, and Sir James Campbell Baronet.
Executing an agreement between John Earl of Breadalbane and James Menzies for exchange of lands in Perth.	15 Geo. 3. c. 45 Pr.	22 May 1775
An Act for carrying into Execution an Agreement made between John Earl of Breadalbane, and James Menzies of Culdares, for the Exchange of certain Lands, in the County of Perth.
Viscount Grimston's Estate Act 1775	15 Geo. 3. c. 46 Pr.	22 May 1775
An Act for vesting divers Manors, Messuages, Lands, and Hereditaments, in the Counties of Essex and Norfolk, being the settled Estates of James Lord Viscount Grimston of the Kingdom of Ireland, in Trustees, to be sold, for discharging Portions and Incumbrances; and for laying out the Residue of the Money arising by such Sale in the Purchase of other Messuages, Lands, and Hereditaments, situate and being in the County of Hertford, to be settled in lieu thereof to the like Uses.
Establishing and confirming exchanges of lands in Rowsham (Oxfordshire) pursuant to agreements between Sir Charles Cottrell Dormer, Benjamin Holloway and Reverend Harry Lee.	15 Geo. 3. c. 47 Pr.	22 May 1775
An Act for establishing and confirming Exchanges of divers Lands and Hereditaments in the Parish of Rowsham, in the County of Oxford, pursuant to Articles of Agreement between Sir Charles Cottrell Dormer, Benjamin Holloway Esquire, and the Reverend Harry Lee; and for other Purposes therein mentioned.
Shelley's Estate Act 1775	15 Geo. 3. c. 48 Pr.	22 May 1775
An Act to enable the Right Honourable Sir John Shelley Baronet, and the Trustees named in the Settlement on his Marriage with Dame Wilhelmina Shelley deceased, his late Wife, to convey Part of the Estates, in the County of Sussex, comprised in such Settlement, in Exchange for or in lieu of other Estates belonging to the said Sir John Shelley, in the same County.
Warton's Estate Act 1775	15 Geo. 3. c. 49 Pr.	22 May 1775
An Act for confirming and rendering effectual a Partition and Division made by and between Sir James Pennyman Baronet, Charles Anderson Pelham Esquire, and Michael Newton Esquire, of divers Manors, Lands, and Hereditaments, in the Counties of York, Lincoln, and Middlesex, and City of London, late the Estates of Sir Michael Warton Knight, deceased; and for settling and limiting the entire and specific Parts and Shares which, upon the said Partition and Division, have been allotted to each of them, to the several Uses therein mentioned.
Harvey's Estate Act 1775	15 Geo. 3. c. 50 Pr.	22 May 1775
An Act for vesting a Freehold Estate, late of Eliah Harvey Esquire, deceased, called Buckhouse, otherwise Munckham, situate in the Parishes of Woodford and Chigwell, in the County of Essex, in Trustees, and their Heirs in Trust, to sell and convey the same as therein mentioned; and for applying the Money arising by Sale thereof for the Benefit of Edward Harvey an infant, his only Son and Heir at Law, and for the other Purposes therein mentioned.
Ashburnham Legh's Estate Estate Act 1775	15 Geo. 3. c. 51 Pr.	22 May 1775
An Act to enable Peter Legh Esquire, and the Reverend Ashburnham Legh Clerk, to grant Building and Improving Leases of Part of their Settled Estates, within the Counties of Lancaster and Chester.
Dicconson's Estate Estate Act 1775	15 Geo. 3. c. 52 Pr.	22 May 1775
An Act for vesting certain Manors, Messuages, Lands, Rents, and Hereditaments, in the Counties of Kent and Middlesex, Part of the Settled Estates of Meliora Dicconson, the Wife of William Dicconson Esquire, in Trustees to be sold; and for investing the Money arising by such Sale in the Purchase of other Lands and Hereditaments, to be settled to the same Uses.
Enabling Worcester Cathedral and Rowland Berkely to exchange lands and tithes in Cotheridge (Worcestershire).	15 Geo. 3. c. 53 Pr.	22 May 1775
An Act to enable the Dean and Chapter of the Cathedral Church of Worcester, and Rowland Berkeley Esquire, to make and establish an Exchange of certain Lands and Tythes in the Parish of Cotheridge, in the County of Worcester.
Smart's Estate Act 1775	15 Geo. 3. c. 54 Pr.	22 May 1775
An Act for Sale of the Estate of Elizabeth Smart, an infant, in the Counties of Durham and Northumberland.
Charging the prebend manor of Mych Milton (Oxfordshire) with payments of two perpetual yearly rent charges or annual payments to Reverend John Wheeldon and successors (prebendaries of Mych Milton) and divesting the fee simple and inheritance out of him and vesting the same, so charged, in Reverend Charles Sturges and heirs.	15 Geo. 3. c. 55 Pr.	22 May 1775
An Act to subject and charge the Prebend Manor of Mych Milton, in the County of Oxford, and the Lands, Tenements, and Hereditaments thereunto belonging, with the Payment of Two several perpetual yearly Rent Charges, or Annual Payments, to the Reverend John Wheeldon, and his Successors, Prebendaries of the Prebend of Mych Milton aforesaid; and for divesting the Fee-Simple and Inheritance thereof out of him and his Successors; and for vesting the same, so charged, in the Reverend Charles Sturges, his Heirs and Assigns.
Dickson's Estate Act 1775	15 Geo. 3. c. 56 Pr.	22 May 1775
An Act for empowering the Judges of the Court of Session in Scotland, to sell such Part or Parts of the Estate of Ednam, in the County of Roxburgh, formerly belonging to James Dickson Esquire, deceased, and now to Captain William Dickson, as shall be sufficient for Payment of the Debts affecting the same.
Peacocke's Estate Act 1775	15 Geo. 3. c. 57 Pr.	22 May 1775
An Act for vesting Part of the Settled Estates of William Peacocke Esquire, and Emma his Wife, in the Parish of Llanedwan, in the County of Anglesea; in the said William Peacocke, in Fee-Simple; and for settling an Estate of the said William Peacocke, in the Parish of Penmynydd, in the same County, of greater Value, in lieu thereof.
Doyne's Estate Act 1775	15 Geo. 3. c. 58 Pr.	22 May 1775
An Act for vesting the Fee-Simple and Inheritance of the Estates, late of Robert Doyne Esquire, deceased, in Trustees, in Trust, to sell and dispose of so much thereof as may be sufficient to pay off and discharge all the Debts, Legacies, and other Incumbrances affecting the said Estates; and for the other Purposes therein mentioned.
Bull's Estate Act 1775	15 Geo. 3. c. 59 Pr.	22 May 1775
An Act for vesting the Estates of Edmund Bull Esquire, in the County of Hertford, and City of London, in Trustees, to be sold, for the Payment of Debts and Incumbrances; and other Purposes therein expressed.
Peacock's Estate Act 1775	15 Geo. 3. c. 60 Pr.	22 May 1775
An Act for vesting in the Reverend William Peacock, and his Heirs, in Fee-Simple, Part of the Glebe Lands and the Tythes of the Parish of Danby Wiske, and Gafferton, otherwise Yafferton, in the County of York; and for settling certain Freehold Estates of the said William Peacock in him and his Successors, Rectors of the said Parish, in lieu thereof; and for other Purposes therein mentioned.
Pitt's Estate Act 1775	15 Geo. 3. c. 61 Pr.	22 May 1775
An Act for vesting certain Freehold Estates in the Counties of Berks and Wilts, devised by the Will of William Pitt Esquire, deceased, in Trustees, to be sold, and for laying out the Money arising by such Sale, in the Purchase of other Lands and Hereditaments, to be settled in lieu thereof, to such of the Uses limited or devised by the said Will, as are or shall be capable of taking Effect.
Bland's Estate Act 1775	15 Geo. 3. c. 62 Pr.	22 May 1775
An Act to enable Mordecai Greene Esquire, and Mary his Wife, to carry into Execution an Agreement made for and on the Behalf of Alice Bland Widow, deceased, with Ralph Milner; and also to grant Building and Repairing Leases of such Parts of the Estates of the said Alice Bland, as lie in or near the Town of Manchester; and also Leases for Twenty-one Years, of other the Estates late of the said Alice Bland.
Lock's Estate Act 1775	15 Geo. 3. c. 63 Pr.	22 May 1775
An Act for vesting the Freehold and Copyhold Estates, entailed by the Will of William Lock Esquire, deceased, in Trustees, to be sold; and for purchasing other Estates, to be settled to the same Uses, subject to the Annuities and other Charges thereon; and for other Purposes therein mentioned.
Dudley's Estate Act 1775	15 Geo. 3. c. 64 Pr.	22 May 1775
An Act for vesting the Settled Estates, devised by the Will of Thomas Dudley deceased, in Trustees, to be sold; and for applying the Money arising by such Sale, in the Purchase of Lands, Tenements, or Hereditaments, to be settled to the like Uses.
Mountague Close Estate Act 1775	15 Geo. 3. c. 65 Pr.	22 May 1775
An Act for vesting certain Parts of divers Messuages, Wharfs, and Hereditaments, called Montague Close, in the County of Surrey, in Trustees, in Trust, to sell the same; and for other Purposes therein mentioned.
Heming's Estate Act 1775	15 Geo. 3. c. 66 Pr.	22 May 1775
An Act for vesting the several Estates of the. late Samuel Heming Esquire, situate in Jamaica, in Trustees, in Trust, to sell the same, for the Payment of the Incumbrances thereon, and of this Debts, and for other Purposes.
Sledmire Inclosure Act 1775	15 Geo. 3. c. 67 Pr.	22 May 1775
An Act for enclosing and improving several Grounds in the Parish of Sledmire, in the East Riding of the County of York.
Hickling Inclosure Act 1775	15 Geo. 3. c. 68 Pr.	22 May 1775
An Act for dividing and enclosing the Open Fields, Meadows, Commons, and Waste Grounds, lying in the Parish of Hickling, in the County of Nottingham.
Cutsden or Cuttesden (Worcestershire) Inclosure Act 1775	15 Geo. 3. c. 69 Pr.	22 May 1775
An Act for dividing and enclosing the Open and Common Fields, Hills, Sleights, and other Commonable Lands, within the Hamlet of Cutsden, otherwise Cuttesden, in the Parish of Bredon, in the County of Worcester.
Quadring Inclosure Act 1775	15 Geo. 3. c. 70 Pr.	22 May 1775
An Act for dividing and enclosing the Common Fens, Common Meadows, Common Fields, and Waste Grounds, in the Parish of Quadring, and in Quadring Hundred, in the County of Lincoln.
Brinsley Inclosure Act 1775	15 Geo. 3. c. 71 Pr.	22 May 1775
An Act for dividing and enclosing the Commons, and Common Meadows, in the Liberty of Brinsley, in the Parish of Greasley, in the County of Nottingham.
Stockham Marsh Inclosure Act 1775	15 Geo. 3. c. 72 Pr.	22 May 1775
An Act for dividing, allotting, and enclosing, a certain Stinted Pasture called Stockham Marsh, in the Parish of Bremhill, in the County of Wilts; and for exonerating certain old Enclosures, within the said Parish, from the Payment of Tythes.
Long Itchington and Bascote (Warwickshire) Inclosure Act 1775	15 Geo. 3. c. 73 Pr.	22 May 1775
An Act for dividing and enclosing the Open Fields and Commonable Places of Long Itchington and Bascote, in the County of Warwick.
Sutton-cum-Lound Inclosure Act 1775	15 Geo. 3. c. 74 Pr.	22 May 1775
An Act for dividing and enclosing certain Open Arable Fields, Meadows, Pastures, Commons, and Waste Grounds, in the Parish of Sutton cum Lound, in the County of Nottingham.
Knapwell Inclosure Act 1775	15 Geo. 3. c. 75 Pr.	22 May 1775
An Act for dividing and enclosing the Open Fields, Meadows, Common Pastures, and other Commonable Lands and Waste Grounds, within the Parish of Knapwell, in the County of Cambridge.
Braunston Inclosure Act 1775	15 Geo. 3. c. 76 Pr.	22 May 1775
An Act for dividing and enclosing the Open and Common Fields, Common Pastures, Common Meadows, and other Commonable Lands, of and within the Parish and Liberties of Braunston, in the County of Northampton.
Upper and Lower Tadmarton (Oxfordshire) inclosures.	15 Geo. 3. c. 77 Pr.	22 May 1775
An Act for dividing and enclosing the Open and Common Field, and Commonable Land, lying within the Townships, Liberties, and Precincts of Upper Tadmarton and Lower Tadmarton, in the County of Oxford.
Lea, Marston, and Dunton (Warwickshire) inclosures.	15 Geo. 3. c. 78 Pr.	22 May 1775
An Act for dividing and enclosing the Open Fields, Meadow, and Commons, or Waste Grounds, within the Hamlets of Lea and Marston, in the Parish of Lea Marston, in the County of Warwick, and also certain Pieces of Waste Ground within the Liberty of Dunton, in the Parish of Curdworth, in the said County.
Pewsey Inclosure Act 1775	15 Geo. 3. c. 79 Pr.	22 May 1775
An Act for dividing and laying in Severalty the Open and Common Fields, and Part of the Open and Common Downs, called Southcott and Kepnell Down, Work Down, and other Commonable Places; and also for dividing and enclosing Pewsey Common, in the Parish of Pewsey, in the County of Wilts.
Brize Norton Inclosure Act 1775	15 Geo. 3. c. 80 Pr.	22 May 1775
An Act for dividing, allotting, and enclosing, the open and Common Fields, Common Meadows, Common Pastures, and all other the Commonable Grounds, in the Parish of Brize Norton, in the County of Oxford.
Kildale Inclosure Act 1775	15 Geo. 3. c. 81 Pr.	22 May 1775
An Act to render valid and effectual certain Articles of Agreement for enclosing and dividing the Commons, and Waste Grounds in the Manor and Parish of Kildale, in the County of York.
Claydon Inclosure Act 1775	15 Geo. 3. c. 82 Pr.	22 May 1775
An Act for dividing and enclosing the Open Common Fields, Lands, Pastures, and Commonable Grounds, within the Township, Liberties, and Precincts of Claydon, in the Parish of Cropredy, in the County of Oxford.
Todnam or Todenham (Gloucestershire) Inclosure Act 1775	15 Geo. 3. c. 83 Pr.	22 May 1775
An Act for dividing and enclosing the Open and Common Fields, and other Commonable Lands, in the Parish of Todnam, otherwise Todenham, in the County of Gloucester.
Alnham Inclosure Act 1775	15 Geo. 3. c. 84 Pr.	22 May 1775
An Act for dividing and enclosing a Moor called Alnbam Moor or Alnbam Common, and also the In-field Grounds of the Township of Alnbam, in the Parish of Alnbam, in the County of Northumberland.
Spaldwick with Upthorpe Inclosure Act 1775	15 Geo. 3. c. 85 Pr.	22 May 1775
An Act for dividing, allotting, and enclosing, the Open and Common Fields, Meadows, Commonable Lands, and Commons, within the Parish and Liberties of Spaldwick with Upthorpe, in the County of Huntingdon.
Greene's Divorce Act 1775	15 Geo. 3. c. 86 Pr.	22 May 1775
An Act to dissolve the Marriage of Robert Greene Merchant, with Juliana Greene, otherwise Judge, his now Wise, and to enable him to marry again; and for other Purposes therein mentioned.
Goodricke's Naturalization Act 1775	15 Geo. 3. c. 87 Pr.	22 May 1775
An Act for naturalizing Levina Benjamina Goodricke.
Rendering effectual an agreement between the Duke of Buccleugh and Bishop of Winchester for exchange and enfranchising lands in Adderbury (Oxfordshire) and enabling said Bishop to grant leases.	15 Geo. 3. c. 88 Pr.	26 May 1775
An Act for rendering effectual a Proposal or Agreement made between the Duke of Buccleugh and the Lord Bishop of Winchester, for exchanging and enfranchising certain Leasehold and Copyhold Lands and Hereditaments in the Parish and Manor of Adderbury, in the County of Oxford; and for enabling the said Bishop to grant Leases in Manner therein mentioned.
Earl Ferrers' Estate Act 1775	15 Geo. 3. c. 89 Pr.	26 May 1775
An Act for appointing new Trustees to carry into Execution an Act, passed in the Eighth Year of His present Majesty's Reign, (Note: Earl Ferrers' Estate Act 1768 (8 Geo. 3. c. 56 Pr.)) intituled, "An Act for the more effectually carrying into Execution an Act, made in the Sixth Year of the Reign of His present Majesty, intituled, 'An Act for vesting in Trustees the settled Estate of Washington Earl Ferrers, in the County of Derby, to be sold, for satisfying the Incumbrances and Portions affecting the same, and the rest of the settled Estate, and for other Purposes therein mentioned;'" in the Room and Stead of those appointed by the said Act, who are desirous of resigning the Trust thereby reposed in them.
Leeds Free Grammar School Estate Act 1775	15 Geo. 3. c. 90 Pr.	26 May 1775
An Act for the Sale and Enfranchisement of certain Copyhold Tenements and Premises in the Parish of Leeds, in the County of York, Part of the Estate belonging to the Free Grammar School there, for the Purpose of erecting a Publick Cloth Hall, and making Avenues or Passages thereto; and for applying the Purchase Money for the Benefit of the said School.
Earl of Sefton's Estate Act 1775	15 Geo. 3. c. 91 Pr.	26 May 1775
An Act to confirm several Building Leases already granted by the Right Honourable the Earl of Sefton, of the Kingdom of Ireland, of Part of his settled Estates in the County of Lancaster, and to enable him during his Life, and after his Decease the Trustee, during the Minority of any Infant, to grant other Building and Improving Leases; and for other Purposes in the said Act mentioned.
Pulford's Estate Act 1775	15 Geo. 3. c. 92 Pr.	26 May 1775
An Act for vesting certain Lands at Hadley, in the Parish of Wellington, in the County of Salop, devised by the Will of the Reverend Joshua Pulford Clerk, deceased, in Joshua Freeman and his Heirs.
Enabling Reverend Edmund Hodshon, rector of Spinnithorne (Yorkshire), to exchange tithes of Harnby and Spinnithorne with lands in Governham (Yorkshire) belonging to William Boynes.	15 Geo. 3. c. 93 Pr.	26 May 1775
An Act to enable the Reverend Edmund Hodshon, Rector of Spennithorne in the County of York, to exchange the Tythes of the Townships of Harnby and Spennithorne, for Lands in the Parish of Goverham, in the County of York, belonging to Mr. Willam Baynes, to be settled to the same Uses.
Worcester College Estate Act 1775	15 Geo. 3. c. 94 Pr.	26 May 1775
An Act for explaining, amending, and enlarging the Powers granted by an Act, passed in the Eighteenth Year of His late Majesty King George the Second, intituled, "An Act for Sale of certain Leasehold Estates, late of Sarah Eaton deceased, and by her devised to the Provost, Fellows, and Scholars of Worcester College, in the University of Oxford; and for laying out the Money arising thereby in the Purchase of Fee-Simple Estates; and for other Purposes therein mentioned;" (Note: Worcester College Estate Act 1744 (18 Geo. 2. c. 19 Pr.)) and for indemnifying the acting Trustee or Trustees, appointed under the said Act, for having expended a larger Sum of Money than allowed by that Act; and for other Purposes therein mentioned.
Wootton Wawen or Waves Wootton (Warwickshire) Inclosure Act 1775	15 Geo. 3. c. 95 Pr.	26 May 1775
An Act for dividing and enclosing the Open and Common Fields, Common Meadows, and Commonable Lands, within the Parish of Wootton Wawen, otherwise Waves Wootton, in the County of Warwick.

=== Sources ===
- Pickering, Danby, ed. (1775). "15 George III - 1774-5". The Statutes at Large. Vol. 31. Cambridge: Charles Bathurst – via Google Books.
- Journals of the House of Commons. Vol. 35. London: His Majesty's Stationery Office. 1803. pp. 5–395 – via Google Books.
- Chronological Table of and Index to the Statutes. Vol. 1: To the End of the Session 59 Vict. Sess. 2 (1895) (13th ed.). London: Her Majesty's Stationery Office. 1896. pp. 131–132 – via Google Books.
- "Acts of the Parliament of Great Britain from 1775". legislation.gov.uk. The National Archives.

== See also ==
- List of acts of the Parliament of Great Britain
