= Restraining Acts 1775 =

Acts of the Parliament of Great Britain

Trade Act 1775
- Act of Parliament
- Parliament of Great Britain
- Long title: An Act to restrain the Trade and Commerce of the Provinces of Massachusetts Bay and New Hampshire, and Colonies of Connecticut, and Rhode Island and Providence Plantation, in North America, to Great Britain, Ireland, and the British Islands in the West Indies; and to prohibit such Provinces and Colonies from carrying on any Fishery on the Banks of Newfoundland, or other Places therein mentioned, under certain Conditions and Limitations.
- Citation: 15 Geo. 3. c. 10
- Territorial extent: Great Britain; British America

Dates
- Royal assent: 30 March 1775
- Commencement: 29 November 1774 (Note: Start of session.)
- Repealed: 6 August 1861

Other legislation
- Amended by: Prohibitory Act 1776
- Repealed by: Statute Law Revision Act 1861
- Relates to: Navigation Act 1660; Trade Act 1774; Trade (No. 2) Act 1775

Status: Repealed

Text of statute as originally enacted

Trade (No. 2) Act 1775
- Act of Parliament
- Parliament of Great Britain
- Long title: An Act to restrain the Trade and Commerce of the Colonies of New Jersey, Pennsylvania, Maryland, Virginia, and South Carolina, to Great Britain, Ireland, and the British Islands in the West Indies, under certain Conditions and Limitations.
- Citation: 15 Geo. 3. c. 18
- Territorial extent: Great Britain; British America

Dates
- Royal assent: 13 April 1775
- Commencement: 29 November 1774 (Note: Start of session.)
- Repealed: 6 August 1861

Other legislation
- Amended by: Prohibitory Act 1776
- Repealed by: Statute Law Revision Act 1861
- Relates to: Navigation Act 1660; Trade Act 1774; Trade Act 1775

Status: Repealed

Text of statute as originally enacted

The Restraining Acts of early 1775 were two acts passed by the Parliament of Great Britain, which limited colonial trade in response to both increasing and spreading civil disobedience in Massachusetts and New England, and similar trade restrictions instituted by elected colonial representatives. With time the foment would spread to most of its American Colonies. The first restraining act, (15 Geo. 3. c. 10) known variously as the New England Trade And Fisheries Act, the New England Restraining Act, or the Trade Act 1775, limited the export and import of any goods to and from only Great Britain, Ireland, and the British West Indies; it also prohibited the New England colonies from fishing in the waters off Newfoundland and most of America's Atlantic coast, without special permissions and documentation, and imposed stiff penalties on both perpetrators and administrators if violations occurred. Previously legal or finessed trade between the colonies themselves or with other nations was prohibited, and enforced by naval blockade, effective 1 July 1775. The second restraining act, (15 Geo. 3. c. 18) known also as the Trade Act 1775, similarly limited the export or import of any goods by way of only Great Britain, Ireland, and the British West Indies for most colonies south of New England; it was passed shortly after the first, upon receiving news in April that the colony's trade boycott had spread widely among other colonies. New York, Delaware, North Carolina and Georgia would escape these restraints on trade, but only for a few months.

The acts were passed one year after the first of the Intolerable Acts had been imposed to show the potential of tighter British sovereignty over Boston, Massachusetts, and threatened the same treatment in other colonies generally. Instead of quieting the populace, these coercive laws had been met with increasing resistance and rising resentment among the colonials. Over this same period the colonies established independent communications, and the First Continental Congress established the colonial's boycott to restrain the import of British goods then the export of colonial products, which caused disruption in British trade and revenues and shortages in the colonies themselves. Additionally, the colonies had established alternative legislatures in defiance of established ones under direct imperial control. The growing defiance caused a mutual scramble for munitions and treasonous acts to obtain them, indicating that more violence was on the horizon. News arriving about the first restraining act, and related actions of the Massachusetts military governor would lead directly to the first military confrontation in the American Revolutionary War.

With fighting started, any possible reconciliation became moot, and the King would issue his Royal Proclamation of Rebellion in August. In December 1775 Parliament passed the Prohibitory Act (16 Geo. 3. c. 5) prohibiting any trade with all the colonies, and enforcing it with a tighter blockade and more severe penalties; it was a declaration of economic war, with inbound or outbound ships, mariners and cargoes treated as if they "were the ships and effects of open enemies ... [to be] so adjudged, deemed, and taken, in all courts." With this drastic change in British tactics, effective 1 January 1776, the two Restraining Acts as well as the Boston Port Act were repealed, "whereas the prohibitions and restraints imposed by the said acts will be rendered unnecessary by the provisions of this act."

== Rebellion proclaimed ==
The province of Massachusetts Bay was in a state of crisis following the passage of the Coercive Acts in 1774. When colonists formed the extra-legal Massachusetts Provincial Congress and began organizing militia units independent of British control, Parliament responded on 9 February 1775, by declaring that Massachusetts was in a state of rebellion.

The joint resolution of Parliament read, in part:

[W]e find, that a part of your Majesty's subjects in the province of the Massachusetts Bay have proceeded so far to resist the authority of the supreme legislature, that a rebellion at this time actually exists within the said province; and we see, with the utmost concern, that they have been countenanced and encouraged by unlawful combinations and engagements, entered into by your Majesty's subjects in several of the other colonies, to the injury and oppression of many of their innocent fellow-subjects resident within the kingdom of Great Britain, and the rest of your Majesty's dominions

One of the Coercive Acts, the Boston Port Act, had cut off Boston's trade; this blockade was now extended to all of Massachusetts.

== New England Restraining Act ==
The North ministry next turned its attention to New England generally. The New England Restraining Act (short title: New England Trade And Fisheries Act) (Note: This act also has been variously cited as 15 Geo. 3. c. 31, the Newfoundland Fisheries Act 1775, also known as Palliser's Act, and named for Hugh Palliser. This act was passed later in the same session of Parliament, the 31st act; section 12 of this act closed a documented loophole which had previously allowed immigration to the continent, and made it illegal and punishable by a fine.) was the ministry's response to the American colonies' decision to boycott British goods, as embodied in the Continental Association of 1774. It was given royal assent by George III on 30 March 1775. The act provided that New England's trade be limited to Britain and the British West Indies (trade with other nations was prohibited, effective 1 July 1775). Moreover, New England ships were barred from the North Atlantic fisheries (a measure that pleased British Canadians, but threatened considerable harm to New England's economy), effective 20 July 1775.

== Restraining Act extended ==
In April 1775, after news was received in London that colonies outside of New England had joined the Continental Association, a second restraining Act was passed to include the colonies of Pennsylvania, New Jersey, Virginia, Maryland and South Carolina. New York, Delaware, North Carolina, and Georgia were not included because the North ministry mistakenly believed that those colonies were opposed to the colonial boycott.

== Repeal ==
The acts were repealed by section 1 of, and the schedule to, the Statute Law Revision Act 1861 (24 & 25 Vict. c. 101), which came into force on 6 August 1861.

== Bibliography ==
- Cogliano, Francis D. (1999). Revolutionary America, 1763–1815: A Political History. Routledge.
- Jensen, Merrill. The Founding of a Nation: A History of the American Revolution, 1763–1776. New York: Oxford University Press, 1968.
