= Boston Port Act =

Act of the Parliament of Great Britain to punish Boston for the Boston Tea Party

Trade Act 1774
- Act of Parliament
- Parliament of Great Britain
- Long title: An Act to discontinue in such Manner, and for such Time as are therein mentioned, the landing and discharging, landing or shipping, of Goods, Wares, and Merchandise, at the Town and within the Harbour of Boston, in the Province of Massachusetts Bay, in North America.
- Citation: 14 Geo. 3. c. 19
- Territorial extent: Great Britain; Province of Massachusetts Bay

Dates
- Royal assent: March 31, 1774
- Commencement: June 1, 1774 (Note: Section 1.)
- Repealed: January, 1 1776
Other legislation
Repealed by	Prohibitory Act 1776
Relates to	Sugar Act 1763; Trade Act 1775; Trade (No. 2) Act 1775

Status: Repealed

Text of statute as originally enacted

The Boston Port Act, also called the Trade Act 1774 (14 Geo. 3. c. 19), was an act of the Parliament of Great Britain which became law on March 31, 1774, and took effect on June 1, 1774. It was one of five measures (variously called the Intolerable Acts, the Punitive Acts or the Coercive Acts) that were enacted during the spring of 1774 to punish Boston for the December 16, 1773, Boston Tea Party.

== Background ==
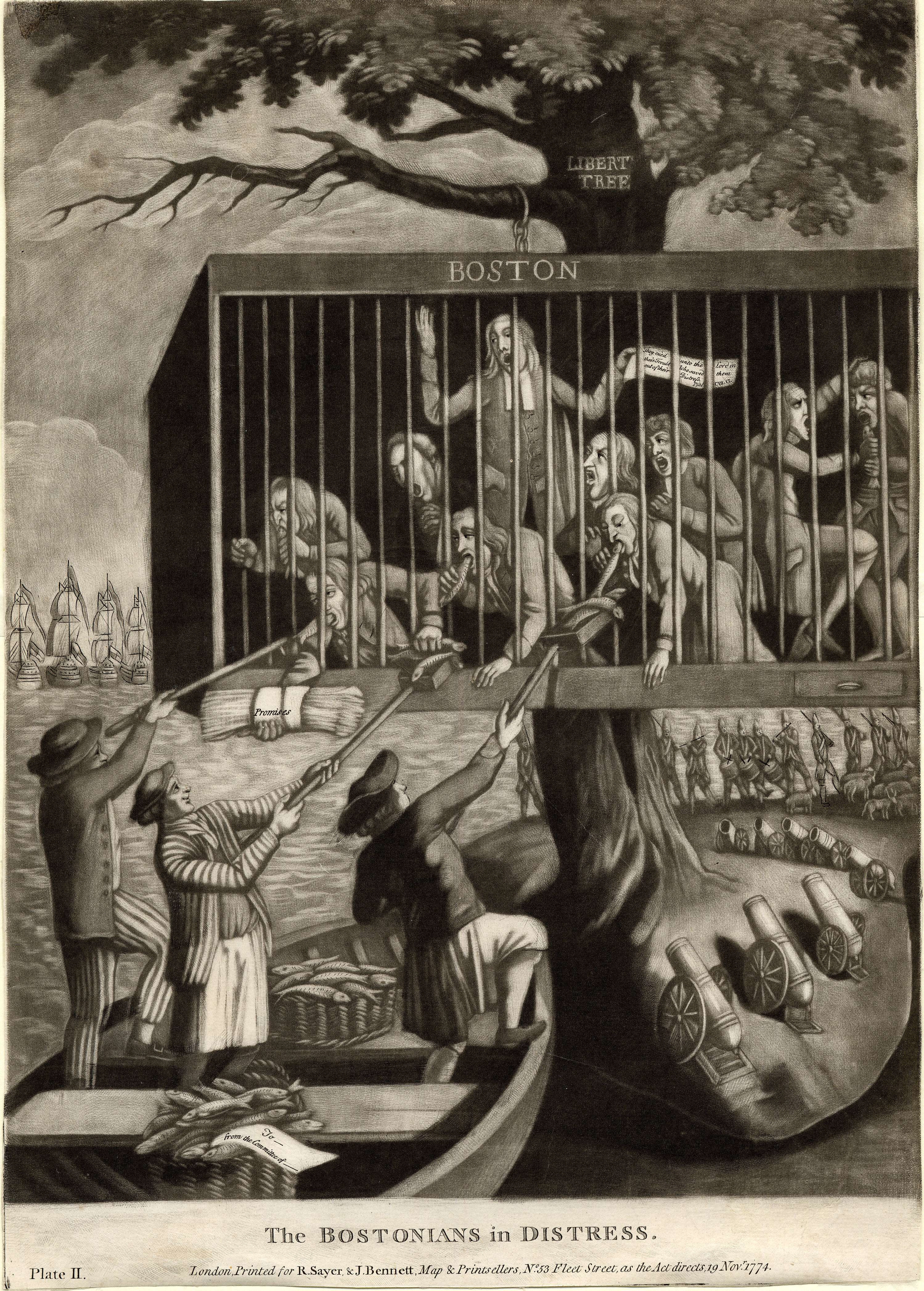
Satirical image depicting three sailors feeding fish to imprisoned Bostonian citizens.

The act was a response to Boston citizens throwing East India Company ships cargo's of imported tea into the harbour, known as the Boston Tea Party. King George III's speech of March 7, 1774 charged the colonists with attempting to injure British commerce and subvert the constitution. On March 18, Lord North brought in the Port Bill, which outlawed the use of the Port of Boston (by setting up a barricade/blockade) for "landing and discharging, loading or shipping, of goods, wares, and merchandise" until restitution was made to the King's treasury (for customs duty lost) and to the East India Company for damages suffered. In other words, it closed Boston Port to all ships, no matter what business the ship had. It also provided that Massachusetts Colony's seat of government should be moved to Salem and Marblehead made a port of entry. The Act was to take effect on June 1.

== Passage ==
Even some of the strongest allies of America in Parliament at first approved the act as moderate and reasonable, and argued that the city could end the punishment at any time by paying for the merchandise destroyed in the riot and allowing law and order to have their course. However, the Whig opposition in Parliament soon fought the bill in its various stages led by Edmund Burke, Isaac Barré, Thomas Pownall and others. Despite their opposition, the act became a law on March 31, without a division in the Commons and by a unanimous vote in the Lords.

== Aftermath ==
Royal Navy warships subsequently began patrols at the mouth of Boston Harbor to enforce the acts. The British Army also joined in enforcing the blockade, and Boston was filled with troops led by Commander-in-Chief Thomas Gage. Colonists protested that the Port Act penalized thousands of residents and violated their rights as subjects of George III.

As the Port of Boston was a major source of supplies for the citizens of Massachusetts, sympathetic colonies as far away as South Carolina sent relief supplies to the settlers of Massachusetts Bay. So great was the response that the Boston leaders boasted that the town would become the chief grain port of America if the act was not repealed.

June 1 was widely observed as a day of fasting and prayer, bells being tolled, flags placed at half-mast, and houses draped in mourning. That was the first step in the unification of the Thirteen Colonies since they now had a cause for which to work together.

The First Continental Congress was convened in Philadelphia on September 5, 1774 to co-ordinate a colonial response to the act and the other Coercive Acts.

The whole act was repealed from 1 January 1776 by section 42 of the Prohibitory Act 1776 (16 Geo. 3 c. 5).

== See also ==
- Orangetown Resolutions, adopted on July 4, 1774
