= Colonial molasses trade =

Part of the history of the Caribbean

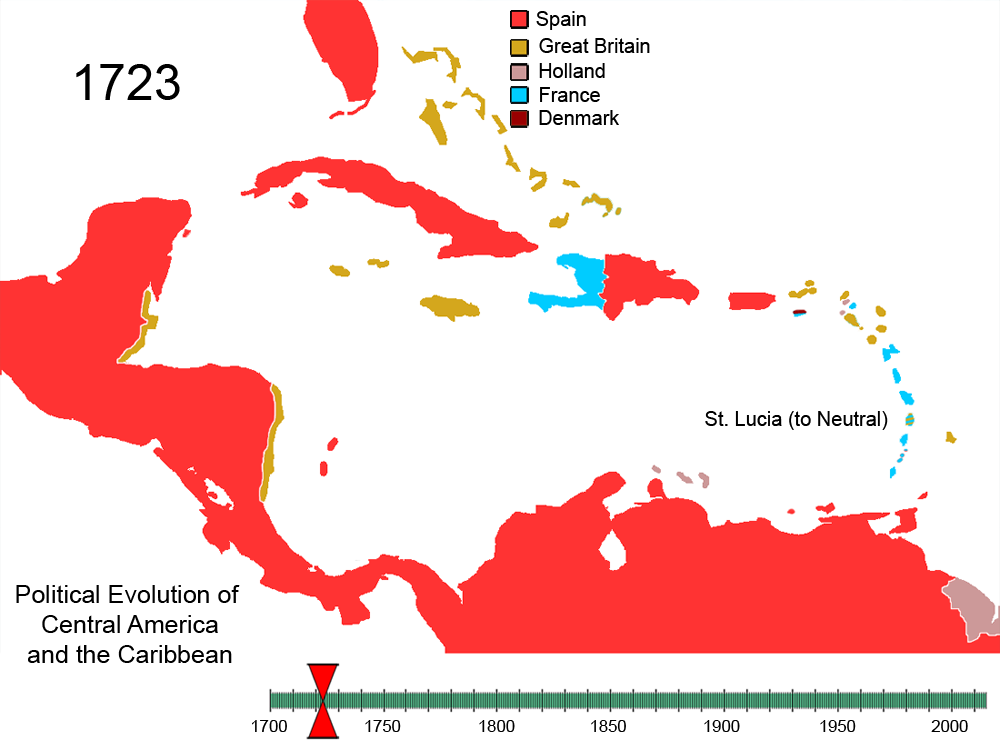
Caribbean colonies in 1723.

The colonial molasses trade occurred throughout the seventeenth, eighteenth, and nineteenth centuries in the European colonies in the Americas. Molasses was a major trading product in the Americas, being produced by enslaved Africans on sugar plantations in European colonies. The good was a major import for the British North American colonies, which used molasses to produce rum, especially in distilleries in New England. The finished product was then exported to Europe as part of the triangular trade.

Sugarcane grows in hot, humid climates. After landing in the Canary Islands, Christopher Columbus brought sugarcane to the Caribbean during his second voyage to the Americas, in 1493. During the eighteenth century, sugar-refining methods at the time produced much more molasses than sugar they do today. It was estimated that "as much as three parts molasses was produced to four parts sugar, and on an average it was estimated that the ratio of molasses to sugar was about one to two." This molasses was either used for table use or in the production of rum.

To make rum, sugarcane juice is fermented with yeast and water and then distilled in copper pot stills. The liquor was given the name rum in 1672, likely after the English slang word rumballion, which meant clamor. Sugar plantation owners in the Caribbean often sold rum on discount to the naval ships so that they would spend more time close to the islands, protecting pirates. Rum also gained popularity in Britain as English ships brought the liquor from America across the Atlantic Ocean.

== Economic significance ==
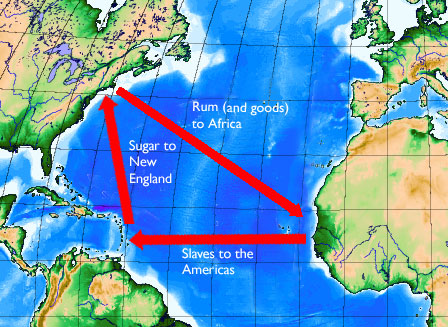
The triangular trade.

In the 18th century, New England became one of the leading rum producers in the world. It was the colonies' only commodity that could be produced in large quantities by non-English powers and sold to the English. The French West Indies had a large supply of molasses at this time, but the area was lacking in lumber, cheese, and flour. These products were the main exports of the North American colonies, which led to a very secure business relationship between the two areas.

Molasses was important in triangular trade. In the triangular trade, slave traders from New England would bring rum to Africa, and in return, they would purchase enslaved Africans. The enslaved cargo was then brought to the West Indies and sold to sugarcane plantations to harvest the sugar for molasses. Molasses was then brought from the West Indies to the colonies and sold to rum producers.

== Problems with demand ==
The molasses trade experienced many problems in the seventeenth and eighteenth centuries. Throughout this period, there was often never enough demand to meet the large supply of molasses that was continuing to increase. Neither England nor France had much of a market for molasses. England imported molasses mostly in the form of rum, but that was usually coming from the colonies at this time. The French islands in the West Indies were prohibited from shipping rum to France about France's market for brandy. In the last decades of the eighteenth century, imports of French rum were at an all-time low. To combat this problem, many English planters on the islands developed their own local distilleries to deal with the large surplus of molasses. There were no specific restrictions on the English islands, so they were able to profit from the disposal. By the 1650s, many plantations on the islands had their own distilleries and were exporting rum to the mainland colonies. By the beginning of the eighteenth century, rum production was rising rapidly.

== Dutch threat to the monopoly ==
At the beginning of the eighteenth century, Dutch possessions in the West Indies began to encourage trade with the islands and New England. Several bills were to be prepared to hinder Dutch trade with colonies, but none of them were passed. By 1715, Boston and many other colonial areas were importing around one hundred thousand gallons of molasses from the Dutch annually. New York was also importing large amounts of foreign molasses compared to England. At the same time, French imports of molasses to the colonies were also growing. This combination of importing foreign products to the English colonies caused England a lot of agitation in the years to come.

== Molasses Act 1733 ==
When the trading of molasses first began, it was unrestrained, apart from small local taxes. The colonies began to prefer French molasses to British because of the price difference. French policy provided incredibly cheap prices, and the British could no longer compete. To control the molasses trade with the English colonies, the Parliament of Great Britain decided to place high taxes on any molasses that was shipped from a foreign power to the colonies in North America. The Molasses Act 1733 imposed a fee of six pence per gallon on foreign molasses. This act was meant to force the colonies into buying molasses from the British or stop producing rum in North America. Many, however, say that the Molasses Act was put in place to destroy New England's rum industry. Contrary to Parliament's plans, the colonies first protested this act. They soon realized that instead of complying with the new Molasses Act, it would be much easier for them to just ignore the new prohibitive taxes and smuggle molasses from the West Indies. Many ports collected about half of the legal duty that must have been imported to their harbors. This was clear in Massachusetts, where it "...imported legally less than half as much molasses and rum as it exported...". These illicit operations would continue for several decades. Had the Molasses Act succeeded in its purpose, New England rum production would have been destroyed.

== Sugar Act 1764 ==
After the French and Indian War, the British tried once again to impose a strict policy on trading goods that benefited the colonies. In 1764, the new British prime minister, George Grenville pressed the Sugar Act 1764 to revive what the Molasses Act 1733 had failed to do. The colonies once again protested this act and succeeded in lowering the tax, but the penalties and fines still angered the colonies. Although the act was only in place for two years, it was much more successful in its goals than the previous Molasses Act of 1733. Smuggling, however, was still very common. This was proven by the fact that annually, the British West Indies exported about a million gallons of molasses to the colonies. After the Sugar Act 1764 was instated, exports fell in the coming years, according to records. On the other hand, mainland rum production rose during those years. The Sugar Act 1764 was later repealed by the Revenue Act 1766, and a penny-per-gallon tax was placed on British and foreign molasses imports. This law marked the first large-scale legal importation of rum and molasses, but smuggling still continued.

When the colonies gained their independence, they were freed from these restraints, but their trade with the British West Indies was restricted. Although the law was later changed to allow direct importation of molasses to New England, the Navigation Acts hindered American shipping until around 1830. By the end of the colonial period, "only about one-sixteenth of the molasses imported to the mainland came from the British sugar islands."

== Other uses of molasses ==
Outside of the rum distillery, the most important use of molasses was its use in brewing beer. Molasses beer was said to be cheaper, easier to make, and less alcoholic than commercial beer. This came in handy for people who lacked access to purified drinking water. Molasses became a very important part of family diets and cooking purposes at this time.

Although the colonial rum industry was very successful in the eighteenth century, whiskey would soon become its largest competitor. Molasses, however, was also used in the colonies for kitchen purposes, such as for baked beans, brown bread, Indian pudding, pie, and soft drinks. Molasses were also used for curing meat and pickling fish, and for medicinal purposes.

At the Battle of New Orleans during the War of 1812, the Americans used barrels of molasses, among other items, as hasty barricades to provide cover from the advancing British. Chapel, Charles Edward, The Boy's Book of Rifles, Coward-McCann, Inc., New York, 1948, page 15.

== New England rum ==
The rum industry in the colonies was limited to the middle colonies and New England.

Massachusetts and Rhode Island together made up three-quarters of the mainland's domestic rum exports by the end of the colonial period. By the middle of the eighteenth century, Massachusetts supported sixty-three distilleries, which accounted annually for about 700,000 gallons. Rhode Island supported around thirty distilleries, and after the Sugar Act was repealed, produced about 500,000 gallons of rum annually.

Other colonies, such as Connecticut, New York, and Pennsylvania also had rum distilleries, but they operated on local terms and did not participate in the large-scale exportation of rum that Massachusetts and Rhode Island were involved in. South of Pennsylvania, there was little interest in rum distillation, as distilleries were very expensive and difficult to build.

== See also ==
- Colonial history of the United States
- Cuisine of the Thirteen Colonies
- History of the Caribbean
- Plantation economy
- Trapiche
- List of commodity booms
