= Triangular trade =

Trade among three ports or regions

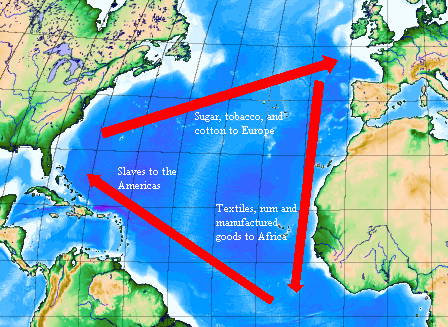
The classical model of the triangular trade

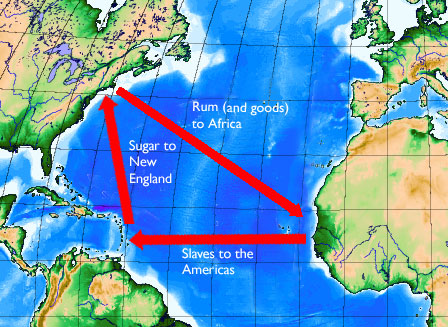
The triangular trade of slaves, sugar, and rum, with New England instead of Europe as the third corner

Triangular trade or triangle trade is trade between three ports or regions. Triangular trade usually evolves when a region has export commodities that are not required in the region from which its major imports come. Such trade has been used to offset trade imbalances between different regions.

The most commonly cited example of a triangular trade is the Atlantic slave trade, but other examples existed. These include the seventeenth-century carriage of manufactured goods from England to New England and Newfoundland, then the transport of dried cod from Newfoundland and New England to the Mediterranean and the Iberian peninsula, followed by cargoes of gold, silver, olive oil, tobacco, dried fruit, and "sacks" of wine back to England. Maritime carriers referred to this Atlantic trade as the "sack trade". A 19th-century example involved general cargo shipped from Britain to Australia, Australian coal to China, then tea and silk back to Britain.

The Atlantic slave trade used a system of three-way transatlantic exchanges – known historically as the triangular trade – which operated between Europe, Africa, and the Americas from the 16th to 19th centuries. This was not the most common method of transporting slaves from Africa to the New World, as out-and-back voyages from the Americas to Africa were the more common. European merchants outfitted slave ships, then shipped manufactured European goods owned by the trading companies to West Africa to get slaves, which they shipped to the Americas (in particular to Brazil and the Caribbean islands). First, in West Africa, merchants sold or bartered European manufactured goods to local slavers in exchange for slaves. Then crews transported the slaves and the remaining European manufactured goods to the Americas, where ship merchants sold the slaves and European manufactured goods to plantation-owners. Merchants then purchased sugar and molasses from the plantation-owners, and crews shipped them to North American colonies (such as the future states of the US), where the merchants sold the remaining supplies of European manufactured goods and slaves, as well as sugar and molasses from plantations to local buyers, and then purchased North American commodities - including tobacco, sugar, cotton, rum, rice, lumber, and animal pelts - to sell in Europe.

This trade, in trade volume, was primarily with South America, where most slaves were sold, but a classic example taught in 20th-century studies is the colonial molasses trade, which involved the circuitous trading of slaves, sugar (often in liquid form, as molasses), and rum between West Africa, the West Indies and the northern colonies of British North America in the 17th and 18th centuries. In this triangular trade, slaves grew the sugar that was used to brew rum, which in turn was traded for more slaves. In this circuit the sea-lane west from Africa to the West Indies (and later, also to Brazil) was known as the Middle Passage; its cargo consisted of abducted or recently purchased African people.

During the Age of Sail, the particular routes were also shaped by the powerful influence of winds and currents. For example, from the main trading nations of Western Europe, it was much easier to sail westwards after first going south of 30° N latitude and reaching the belt of so-called "trade winds", thus arriving in the Caribbean rather than going straight west to the North American mainland. Returning from North America, it was easiest to follow the Gulf Stream in a northeasterly direction using the westerlies. (Even before the voyages of Christopher Columbus, the Portuguese had been using a similar triangle to sail to the Canary Islands and the Azores, and it was then expanded outwards.)

The countries that controlled the transatlantic slave-market until the 18th century in terms of the number of enslaved people shipped were Great Britain, Portugal, and France.

== The Atlantic sack trade ==
From 1620 to 1709, ships and additional maritime vessels embarked from Newfoundland and New England docks in a "sack trade." Sailors from both regions carried salted cod into southern Europe, particularly from Boston and Ferryland into Mediterranean and Iberian peninsular seaports. Spanish and Portuguese Catholics welcomed these traders for manifold reasons, including church exemption of cod from the fasting and abstinence mandated for Lent, Advent, and myriad saint remembrance days. Newfoundland and New England ships then carried Iberian wine "sacks", olive oil, dried fruit, tobacco, and substantial volumes of Iberian specie, mined by indigenous captives in Cerro Rico and Cerro de Pasco, into England. After 1661, Parliament lifted a ban on bartering New England cod for Iberian material goods, as well as for bills of exchange. Oil, fruit, tobacco, New World gold and silver, "sacks" of wine, Iberian material culture, and then this paper currency were exchanged for manufactured products in England. During the final leg, colonial carriers transshipped English metropolitan goods, and any "sacks" of surplus wine, across the Atlantic and back into their homeports.

The "sack trade" dissolved after 1709 because of changes in cod curing processes and provincial demand for sugar as well as molasses. Atlantic demand for dried cod pushed New England and Newfoundland competency thresholds for angling into transatlantic barter and exchange economies. These shifting conceptions, and scope of, provincial competency resulted in New England and Newfoundland schooners searching for more and more fishing sites along northeastern banks. Fishermen remained offshore for extended periods of time as their vessels trawled North American waters. Peter Pope argues that women often worked shorecrews and as substitutes for men.

In order to sustain catches within schooner holds during these protracted trips, fishermen began to "lightly salt" cod and stored the wet fish for air-drying, the latter after returning to points of departure. According to historian Christopher Magra, "invariably, the combination of a wet-salt cure and an air-dry cure produced a greater percentage of refuse-grade, dried cod." Increasing amounts of this "refuse" cod became unmarketable in southern Europe as expansion of the "sack trade" counterintuitively expedited contraction from within. But New England and Newfoundland fishermen tapped their own demand for sugar, molasses, and cheap, domestically-distilled rum, as a commercial avenue to alternate markets for "refuse" cod: sugarcane planters and their agents in Caribbean littorals. Sugarcane planters relied on cheap, low-grade fish to feed chattel slaves.

== The Atlantic triangular slave trade ==
The most historically significant triangular trade was the transatlantic slave trade which operated among Europe, Africa, and the Americas from the 16th to 19th centuries. This was not the most common method of transporting slaves from Africa to the Americas, as more voyages were from a port in the Americas to Africa, and then back to the Americas. In the triangular trade, slave ships would leave European ports (such as Bristol and Nantes) and sail to African ports loaded with goods manufactured in Europe. There, the slave traders would purchase enslaved Africans by exchanging the goods, then sail to the Americas via the Middle Passage to sell their enslaved "cargo" in European colonies. In what was referred to as a "golden triangle", the slave ship would sail back to Europe to begin the cycle again. The enslaved Africans were primarily purchased for the purpose of working on plantations to work producing valuable cash crops (such as sugar, cotton, and tobacco) which were in high demand in Europe. Slave traders from European colonies would occasionally travel to Africa themselves, eliminating the European portion of the voyage.

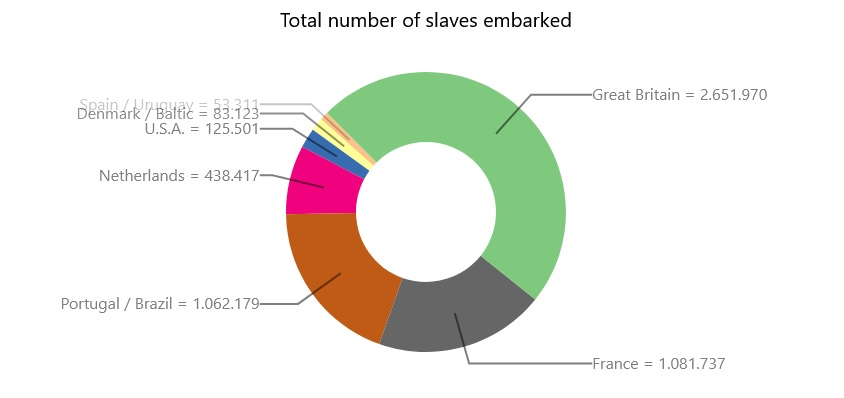
The number of slaves embarked to America from 1450 until 1800 by country

A classic example is the colonial molasses trade. Merchants purchased raw sugar (often in its liquid form, molasses) from plantations in the Caribbean and shipped it to New England and Europe, where it was sold to distillery companies that produced rum. Merchant capitalists used cash from the sale of sugar to purchase rum, furs, and lumber in New England which their crews shipped to Europe.

With the profits from the European sales, merchants purchased Europe's manufactured goods, including tools and weapons and on the next leg, shipped those manufactured goods, along with the American sugar and rum, to West Africa where they bartered the goods for slaves seized by local potentates. Crews then transported the slaves to the Caribbean and sold them to sugar plantation owners. The cash from the sale of slaves in Brazil, the Caribbean islands, and the American South was used to buy more raw materials, restarting the cycle. The full triangle trip took a calendar year on average, according to historian Clifford Shipton.

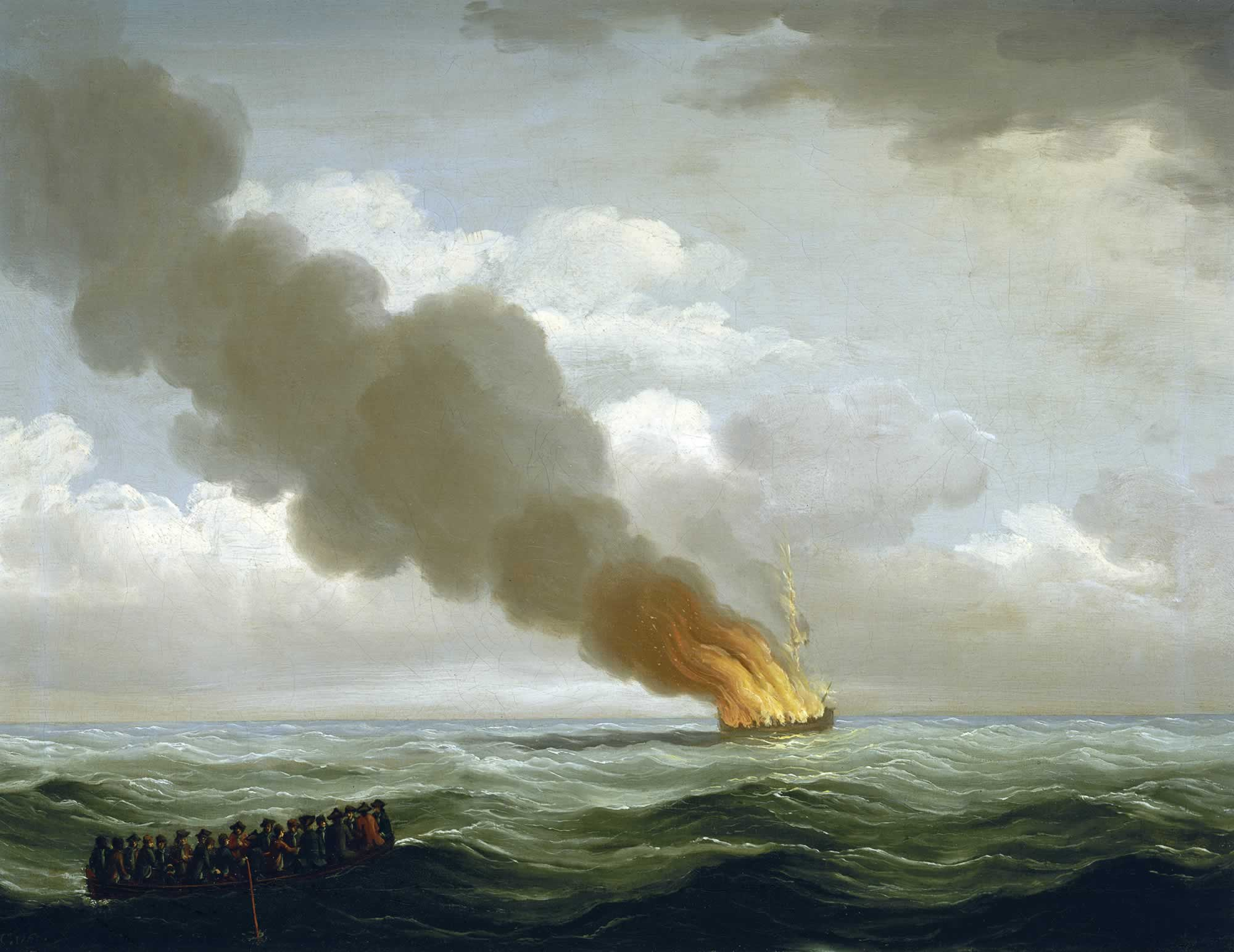
The loss of the slave ship Luxborough Galley in 1727 ("I.C. 1760"), lost in the last leg of the triangular trade, between the Caribbean and Britain.

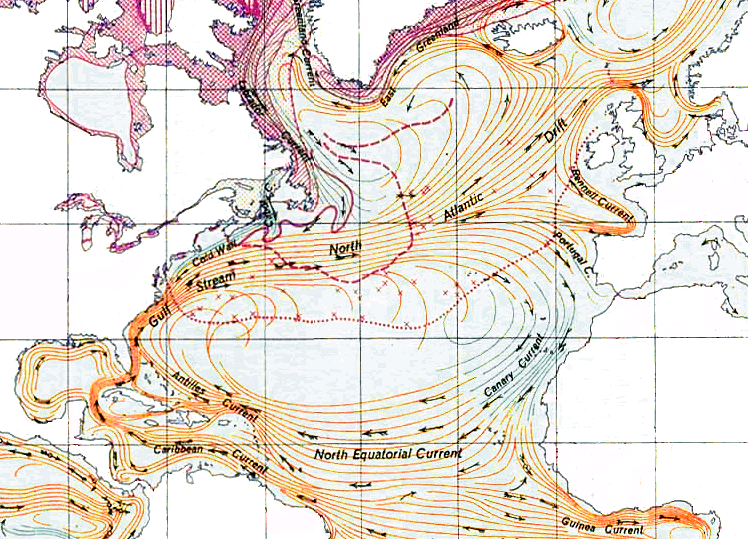
The North Atlantic Gyre

The first leg of the triangle was from a European port to one in West Africa (then known as the "Slave Coast"), in which ships carried supplies for sale and trade, such as copper, cloth, trinkets, slave beads, guns and ammunition. When the ship arrived, its cargo would be sold or bartered for slaves. Ports that exported these enslaved people from Africa include Ouidah, Lagos, Aného (Little Popo), Grand-Popo, Agoué, Jakin, Porto-Novo, and Badagry. These ports traded slaves who were supplied from African communities, tribes and kingdoms, including the Alladah and Ouidah, which were later taken over by the Dahomey kingdom.

On the second leg, ships made the journey of the Middle Passage from Africa to the New World. Over the whole transatlantic slave trade, an estimated 12 to 13% of slaves died of disease or in slave rebellions on board the slave ships before completing their trip, with the rate on individual voyages varying markedly. The average number of slaves carried in one ship is just over 300. Once the ship reached the New World, enslaved survivors were sold in the Caribbean or the American colonies. The ships were then prepared to get them thoroughly cleaned, drained, and loaded with export goods for a return voyage, the third leg, to their home port, from the West Indies the main export cargoes were sugar, rum, and molasses; from Virginia, tobacco and hemp. The ship then returned to Europe to complete the triangle.

The triangle route was not generally followed by individual ships. Slave ships were built to carry large numbers of people, rather than cargo, and variations in the duration of the Atlantic crossing meant that they often arrived in the Americas out-of-season. Slave ships thus often returned to their home port carrying whatever goods were readily available in the Americas but with a large part or all of their capacity with ballast. Cash crops were transported mainly by a separate fleet which only sailed from Europe to the Americas and back. In his books, Herbert S. Klein has argued that in many fields (cost of trade, ways of transport, mortality levels, earnings and benefits of trade for the Europeans and the "so-called triangular trade"), the non-scientific literature portrays a situation which the contemporary historiography refuted a long time ago.

Finally, even if the "triangle trade" idea is essentially incorrect, the Atlantic slave trade was one of the more complex of international trades that existed in the modern period. (…) Thus, while an actual "triangle trade" may not have existed as a significant development for ships in the trade, the economic ties between Asia, Europe, Africa, and America clearly involved a web of relationships that spanned the globe.

A 2017 study provides evidence for the hypothesis that the export of gunpowder to Africa increased the transatlantic slave trade: "A one percent increase in gunpowder set in motion a 5-year gun-slave cycle that increased slave exports by an average of 50%, and the impact continued to grow over time."

=== New England ===
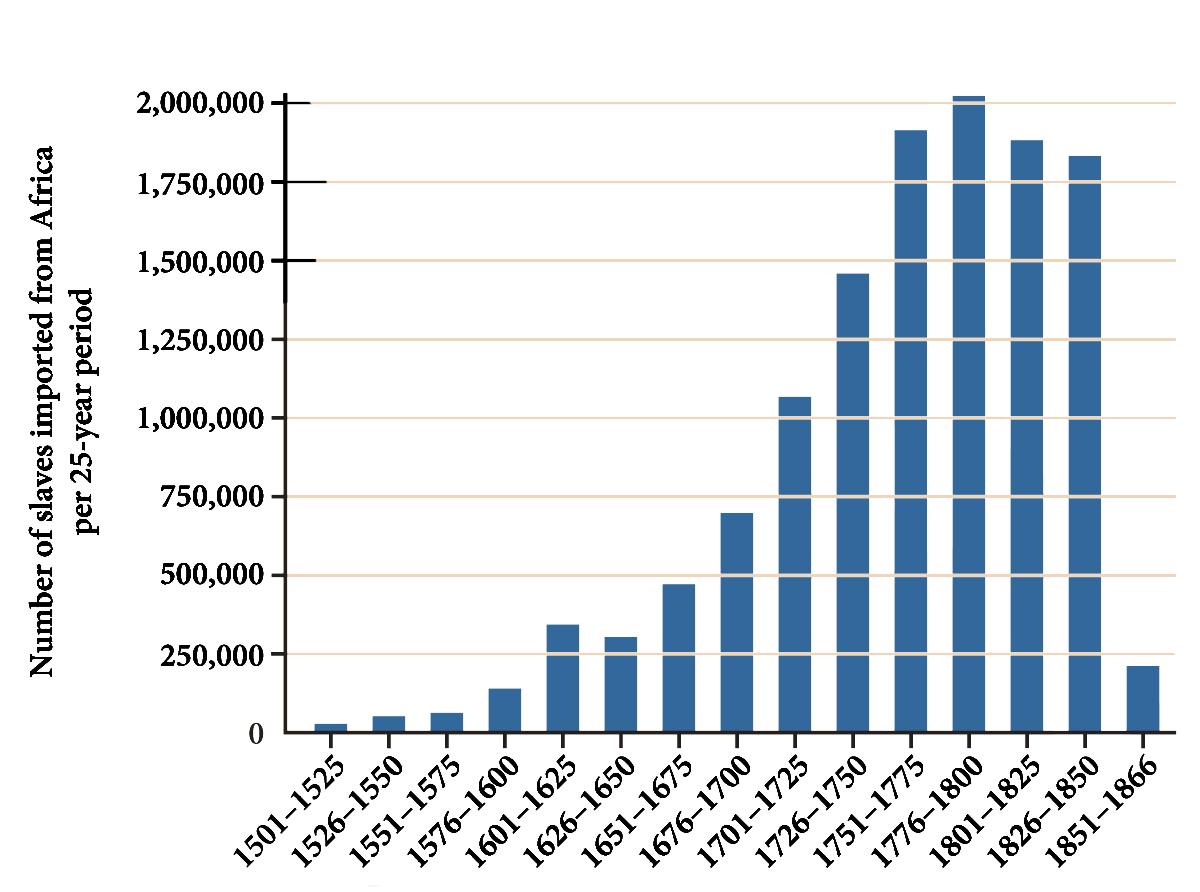
The number of slaves imported from Africa from 1501 to 1866

New England also made rum from Caribbean sugar and molasses, which it shipped to Africa as well as within the New World. Yet, the "triangle trade" as considered in relation to New England was a piecemeal operation. No New England traders are known to have completed a sequential circuit of the full triangle, which took a calendar year on average, according to historian Clifford Shipton. The concept of the New England Triangular trade was first suggested, inconclusively, in an 1866 book by George H. Moore, was picked up in 1872 by historian George C. Mason, and reached full consideration from a lecture in 1887 by American businessman and historian William B. Weeden.

In the context of an incohesive operation within a multipolar Second Atlantic System, expansive eastern seaboard "Farms" had, in earnest after 1690, not only sustained southern New England proprietorship, land banks, and currency, but also a territorial evolution of the Caribbean. This carrying trade contributed to the expansion of monocentric North American littoral zones for sugarcane cultivation into a polycentric West Indies basin and Southern Caribbean plantation complex. During the seventeenth century, colonial charters and royal commissioners precluded attempts to establish a New England carrying trade to by, for example, the Atherton Trading Company and John Hull. But proposals by Peleg Sanford provided implementation frameworks for eighteenth-century "Farms" and carriers. Historian Sean Kelley examines nineteenth-century "American slavers" because "the North American transatlantic slave trade before 1776 was, in essence, merely another branch of the carrying trade."

In response to illegal carrying as well as Rhode Island General Assembly endorsement of Aquidneck as a haven for pirates, the Lords of Trade threatened to embargo Newport until enforcement of a resumption bill for the restoration of lawful mercantile commerce. Periodic trials and executions of notorious smugglers from abroad diverted their attentions away from local privateers, such as the Wanton brothers. Pirates began to disperse from Newport between Queen Anne's War and 1723 mass executions by royal magistrates, establishing the seaport as the dominant carrying hub, with Providence coming in a distant second. British carriers continued to provision plantations outside the boundaries of empire.

Before 1780, wartime embargoes and the Atlantic hurricane season spurred carrier attempts to address deficits by circumventing mercantile restrictions, increasing New England trade with Dutch Suriname as well as the Danish, French, Spanish, and Luso Caribbean. Between 1752 and 1758, southern New England carriers commissioned John Greenwood for a self-deprecating portrait as Sea Captains Carousing in Surinam. In 2012, historical archaeologists in Suriname came across two graves of eighteenth-century carriers from Connecticut (Michael Burnham and William Barbut) as well as two graves of Rhode Island carriers (Nathaniel Angel and William Gardner Wanton) interred during the same period.

Wartime embargoes that reduced overseas trade precipitated speculative ventures, as well as land and estuary auctions of Narragansett tribal reserves, under legislature (public) jurisdiction, by private trusts, a specific type of fiduciary relationship for subsidizing expense accounts, purveying regular annuities, or both. Bidders at vendue were frequently interior "composite" yeomen and fishermen, who (according to certain historians) misconceived of revenue derived from the carrying trade as income "competency." Bidders included competitive carriers in secondary seaports such as Providence as well. Despite the antebellum rise of "Greater Northeast" industrial agriculture, the southern New England "Farms" and the carrying trade in Caribbean sugar, molasses, rice, coffee, indigo, mahogany, and pre-1740 "seasoned slaves", began to dissipate by the Election of 1800 and largely collapsed into agrarian ruins by the War of 1812.

Newport and Bristol, Rhode Island, were major ports involved in the colonial triangular slave trade. Many significant Newport merchants and traders participated in the trade, working closely with merchants and traders in the Caribbean and Charleston, South Carolina.

== Statistics ==
According to research provided by Emory University as well as Henry Louis Gates Jr., an estimated 12.5 million slaves were transported from Africa to colonies in North and South America. The website Voyages: The Trans-Atlantic Slave Trade Database assembles data regarding past trafficking in slaves from Africa. It shows that the top four nations were Portugal, Great Britain, France, and Spain.

Destination	Flag of vessels carrying the slaves							Total
Destination	Portuguese	British	French	Spanish	Dutch	American	Danish	Total
Portuguese Brazil	4,821,127	3,804	9,402	1,033	27,702	1,174	130	4,864,372
British Caribbean	7,919	2,208,296	22,920	5,795	6,996	64,836	1,489	2,318,251
French Caribbean	2,562	90,984	1,003,905	725	12,736	6,242	3,062	1,120,216
Spanish Americas	195,482	103,009	92,944	808,851	24,197	54,901	13,527	1,292,911
Dutch Americas	500	32,446	5,189	0	392,022	9,574	4,998	444,729
United States	382	264,910	8,877	1,851	1,212	110,532	983	388,747
Danish West Indies	0	25,594	7,782	277	5,161	2,799	67,385	108,998
Europe	2,636	3,438	664	0	2,004	119	0	8,861
Africa	69,206	841	13,282	66,391	3,210	2,476	162	155,568
did not arrive	748,452	526,121	216,439	176,601	79,096	52,673	19,304	1,818,686
Total	5,848,266	3,259,443	1,381,404	1,061,524	554,336	305,326	111,040	12,521,339

== Other triangular trades ==
The term "triangular trade" also refers to a variety of other trades.

- A triangular trade is hypothesized to have taken place among ancient East Greece (and possibly Attica), Kommos, and Egypt.
- A new "sugar triangle" developed in the 1820s and 1830s whereby American ships took local produce to Cuba, then brought sugar or coffee from Cuba to the Baltic coast (Russian Empire and Sweden), then bar iron and hemp back to New England.
- Ships sailing from Britain to Australia in the last third of the 19th century found a shortage of cargoes to take back to Britain. Therefore they took New South Wales coal to China and then loaded tea and silk to carry back to Britain. The clipper Thermopylae was one of the ships that sailed this triangular route. When steamships became fuel-efficient enough to cover the distances involved, they could make two trips to Australia in a year, with one returning direct to Britain with Australian wool and the other going via China. This competed with the China and Japan Conference, a cartel of steamship owners who fiercely protected their trade and won a sequence of court cases in order to do so.

== See also ==
- Mercantilism
- North Atlantic triangle
- Transatlantic relations
- Biography and the Black Atlantic
