= Repudiation Day =

Frederick County Maryland celebrating repudiating the British Stamp Act

Frederick County, Maryland has a half-day bank holiday every November 23 to commemorate Repudiation Day. The Maryland Manual states on page 329 that the General Assembly of 1894 made November 23 a bank half-holiday in Frederick County, under the title of "Repudiation Day," in commemoration of the repudiation of the Stamp Act in 1765.

In 1765, the judges of Frederick County became the first to repudiate the British Stamp Act, a tax which was designed to cover the costs of keeping British troops in the American colonies. Frederick County judges decided that they were not going to charge the tax and refused to stamp the documents. Furthermore, the stamps had not arrived from Britain, and the colonists had not been properly notified. The late Judge Edward Delaplaine called the 12 Frederick County judges who repudiated the Stamp Act the "12 immortal judges."

Each year, the Frederick Chapter of the National Society of the Daughters of the American Revolution (DAR) hosts a tea party to celebrate Repudiation Day. Tea and crumpets are served, and the Clerk of the Court reads the original proclamation passed by the judges and the Maryland Provincial Assembly in November 1765.

The house on Record Street (behind the current City Hall), where the Repudiation decision was made, has since been demolished.

In 1904, a plaque listing the names of the twelve men who repudiated the Stamp Act was placed in the Frederick County Courthouse by the Frederick Chapter of the DAR. The plaque can be seen on the right side of the vestibule of the courthouse.

Memorialized on that plaque are: Thomas Beatty, Peter Bainbridge, Josiah Beall, Samuel Beall, William Blair, James Dickson, Andrew Heugh, Charles Jones, William Luckett, David Lynn, Thomas Price and Joseph Smith.

== External References ==
- New York Times Nov. 26 1893 "Maryland has a Stamp Act Anniversary"
- "Joe Volz: Remembering Repudiation Day in Frederick". Archived from the original on 2016-03-04.
- Repudiation Day - The Frederick News-Post Online
