= Stamp Act 1765 =

British statute that taxed its American colonies' use of printed materials

Duties in American Colonies Act 1765
- Act of Parliament
- Parliament of Great Britain
- Long title: An Act for granting and applying certain stamp duties, and other duties, in the British colonies and plantations in America, towards further defraying the expenses of defending, protecting, and securing the same; and for amending such parts of the several Acts of Parliament relating to the trade and revenues of the said colonies and plantations, as direct the manner of determining and recovering the penalties and forfeitures therein mentioned.
- Citation: 5 Geo. 3. c. 12
- Introduced by: The Right Honourable George Grenville, MP; Prime Minister, Chancellor of the Exchequer, and Leader of the House of Commons (Commons)
- Territorial extent: Great Britain; British America; British West Indies; (Note: Section 1.)

Dates
- Royal assent: 22 March 1765
- Commencement: 1 November 1765
- Repealed: 1 May 1766
Other legislation
Repealed by	Duties in American Colonies Act 1766
Relates to	Declaratory Act 1766

Status: Repealed

Text of statute as originally enacted

The Stamp Act 1765, also known as the Duties in American Colonies Act 1765 (5 Geo. 3. c. 12), was an act of the Parliament of Great Britain that imposed a direct tax on the British colonies in America and required that many printed materials in the colonies be produced on stamped paper from London that included an embossed revenue stamp. Printed materials included legal documents, magazines, playing cards, newspapers, and many other types of paper used throughout the colonies, and it had to be paid in British currency, not in colonial paper money.

The purpose of the tax was to pay for British military troops stationed in the American colonies after the French and Indian War, but the colonists had never feared a French invasion to begin with, and they contended that they had already paid their share of the war expenses. Colonists suggested that it was actually a matter of British patronage to surplus British officers and career soldiers who should be paid by London.

The act was very unpopular among colonists. A majority considered it a violation of their rights as Englishmen to be taxed without their consent—consent that only the colonial legislatures could grant. Their slogan was "No taxation without representation". Colonial assemblies sent petitions and protests, and the Stamp Act Congress held in New York City was the first significant joint colonial response to any British measure when it petitioned Parliament and the King.

One member of the British Parliament argued that the American colonists were no different from the 90-percent of Great Britain who did not own property and thus could not vote, but who were nevertheless "virtually" represented by land-owning electors and representatives who had common interests with them. Daniel Dulany, a Maryland attorney and politician, disputed this assertion in a widely read pamphlet, arguing that the relations between the Americans and the English electors were "a knot too infirm to be relied on" for proper representation, "virtual" or otherwise. Local protest groups established Committees of Correspondence, which created a loose coalition from New England to Maryland. Protests and demonstrations increased, often initiated by the Sons of Liberty and occasionally involving hanging of effigies. Very soon, all stamp tax distributors were intimidated into resigning their commissions, and the tax was never effectively collected.

Opposition to the act was not limited to the colonies. British merchants and manufacturers pressured Parliament because their exports to the colonies were threatened by boycotts. The act was repealed on 18 March 1766 as a matter of expedience, but Parliament affirmed its power to legislate for the colonies "in all cases whatsoever" by also passing the Declaratory Act 1766 (6 Geo. 3. c. 12). A series of new taxes and regulations then ensued—likewise opposed by the Americans. The episode played a major role in defining the 27 colonial grievances that were clearly stated within the text of the Indictment of George III section of the United States Declaration of Independence, enabling the organised colonial resistancethat led to the American Revolution in 1775.

== Background ==
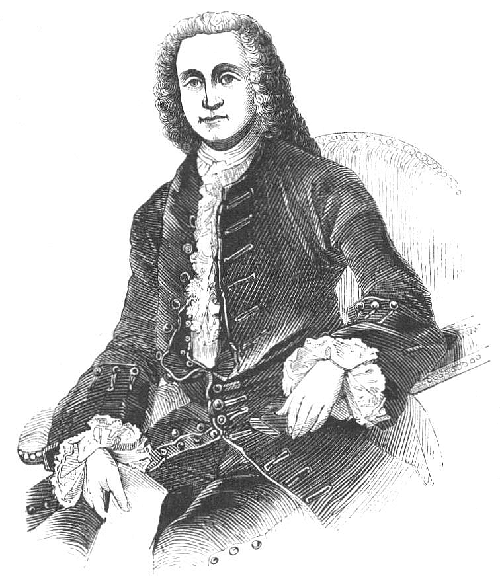
George Grenville, who served as British Prime Minister from 1763 to 1765

The British victory in the Seven Years' War (1756–1763), known in the United States and elsewhere as the French and Indian War, was won at great financial expense. During the war, the British national debt nearly doubled, rising from £72,289,673 in 1755 to almost £129,586,789 by 1764. Post-war expenses were expected to remain high because the Bute ministry decided in early 1763 to keep ten thousand British regulars in the American colonies, which would cost about £225,000 per year, equal to £39 million today. The primary reason for retaining such a large force was that demobilising the army would put 1,500 officers out of work, many of whom were well-connected in Parliament. This made it politically prudent to retain a large peacetime establishment, but Britons were averse to maintaining a standing army at home so it was necessary to garrison most of the troops elsewhere.

The outbreak of Pontiac's War in May 1763 led to the Royal Proclamation of 1763 and the added duty of British soldiers to prevent outbreaks of violence between Native Americans and American colonists. 10,000 British troops were dispatched to the American frontier, with a primary motivation of the move being to provide billets for the officers who were part of the British patronage system. John Adams wrote disparagingly of the deployment, writing that "Revenue is still demanded from America, and appropriated to the maintenance of swarms of officers and pensioners in idleness and luxury".

George Grenville became prime minister in April 1763 after the failure of the short-lived Bute Ministry, and he had to find a way to pay for this large peacetime army. Raising taxes in Britain was out of the question, since there had been virulent protests in Britain against the Bute ministry's 1763 cider tax, with Bute being hanged in effigy. The Grenville ministry, therefore, decided that Parliament would raise this revenue by taxing the American colonists without their consent. This was something new; Parliament had previously passed measures to regulate trade in the colonies, but it had never before directly taxed the colonies to raise revenue.

Politicians in London had always expected American colonists to contribute to the cost of their own defence. So long as a French threat existed, there was little trouble convincing colonial legislatures to provide assistance. Such help was normally provided through the raising of colonial militias, which were funded by taxes raised by colonial legislatures. Also, the legislatures were sometimes willing to help maintain regular British units defending the colonies. So long as this sort of help was forthcoming, there was little reason for the British Parliament to impose its own taxes on the colonists. But after the peace of 1763, colonial militias were quickly stood down. Militia officers were tired of the disdain shown to them by regular British officers, and were frustrated by the near-impossibility of obtaining regular British commissions; they were unwilling to remain in service once the war was over. In any case, they had no military role, as the Indian threat was minimal and there was no foreign threat. Colonial legislators saw no need for the British troops.

The Sugar Act 1764 (4 Geo. 3. c. 15) was the first tax in Grenville's program to raise a revenue in America, which was a modification of the Molasses Act 1733 (6 Geo. 2. c. 13). The 1733 act had imposed a tax of 6 pence per gallon (equal to £5.15 today) on foreign molasses imported into British colonies. The purpose of the Molasses Act 1733 was not actually to raise revenue, but instead to make foreign molasses so expensive that it effectively gave a monopoly to molasses imported from the British West Indies. It did not work; colonial merchants avoided the tax by smuggling or, more often, bribing customs officials. The 1764 act reduced the tax to 3 pence per gallon (equal to £1.97 today) in the hope that the lower rate would increase compliance and thus increase the amount of tax collected. The act also taxed additional imports and included measures to make the customs service more effective.

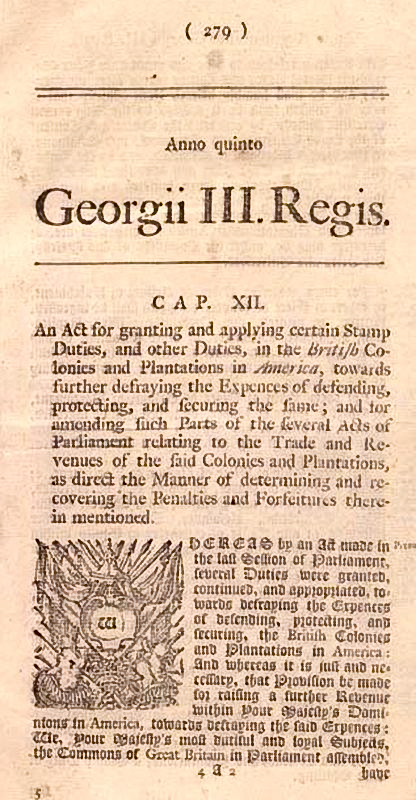
Printed copy of the Stamp Act 1765

American colonists initially objected to the Sugar Act 1764 (4 Geo. 3. c. 15) for economic reasons, but before long they recognised that there were potential constitutional issues involved. The British Constitution guaranteed that taxes could not be levied without the consent of Parliament, but the colonists argued that due to their theoretical Rights as Englishmen, they could not be taxed without their consent, which came in the form of representation in Parliament. The colonists elected no members of Parliament, and so it was seen as a violation of their rights for Parliament to tax them. There was little time to raise this issue in response to the Sugar Act 1764, but it came to be a major objection to the Stamp Act 1765 the following year.

=== British decision-making ===
Parliament announced in April 1764 when the Sugar Act 1764 was passed that they would also consider a stamp tax in the colonies. Opposition from the colonies was soon forthcoming to this possible tax, but members of Parliament and American agents in Great Britain, including Benjamin Franklin, did not anticipate the intensity of the protest that the tax generated.

Stamp acts had been a very successful method of taxation within Great Britain; they generated over £100,000 in tax revenue with very little in collection expenses. By requiring an official stamp on most legal documents, the system was almost self-regulating; a document would be null and void under British law without the required stamp. Imposition of such a tax on the colonies had been considered twice before the Seven Years' War and once again in 1761. Grenville had actually been presented with drafts of colonial stamp acts in September and October 1763, but the proposals lacked the specific knowledge of colonial affairs to adequately describe the documents subject to the stamp. At the time of the passage of the Sugar Act in April 1764, Grenville made it clear that the right to tax the colonies was not in question, and that additional taxes might follow, including a stamp tax.

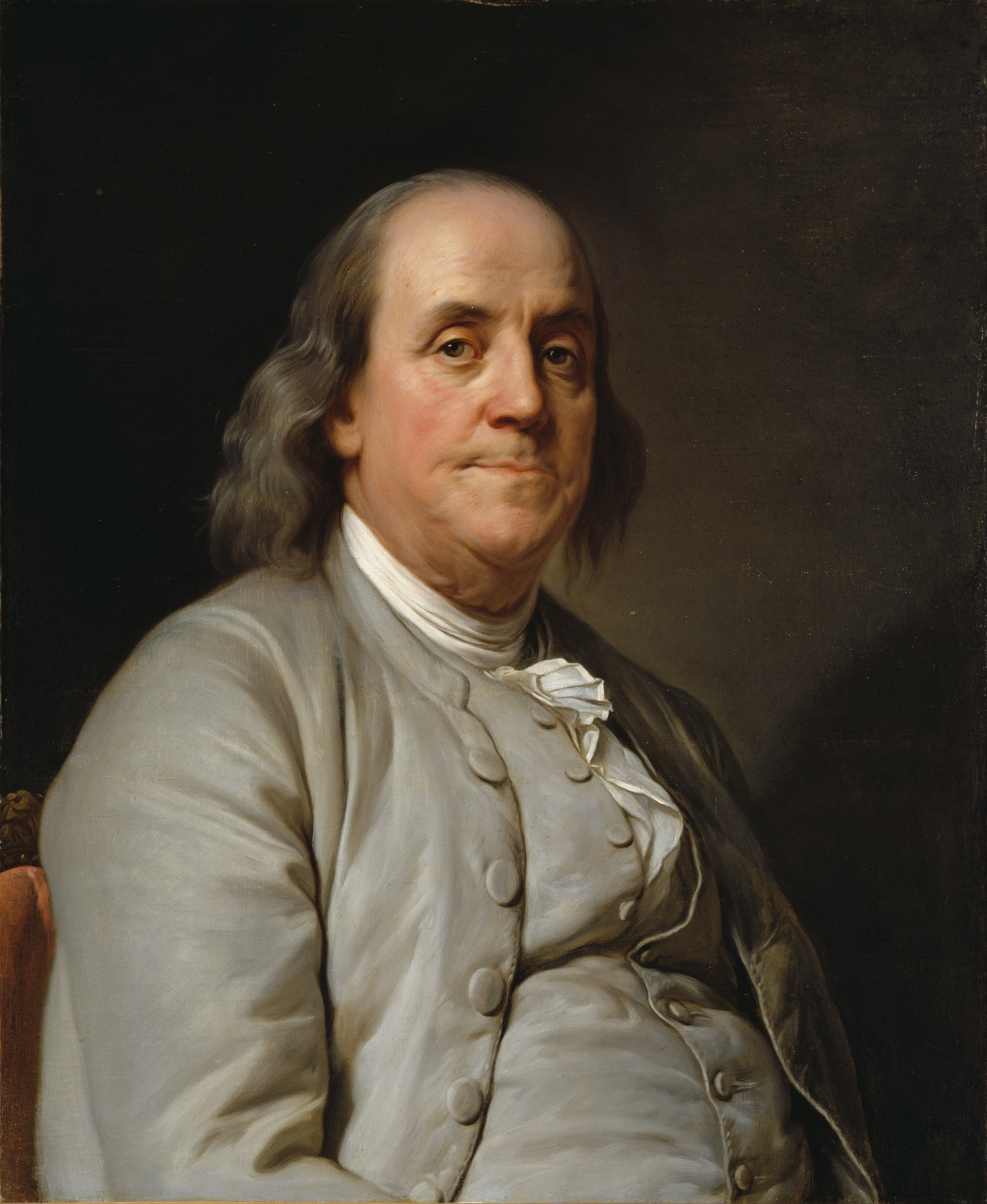
Benjamin Franklin, who represented the Province of Pennsylvania in discussions about the act

The Glorious Revolution had established the principle of parliamentary supremacy. Control of colonial trade and manufactures extended this principle across the ocean. This belief had never been tested on the issue of colonial taxation, but the British assumed that the interests of the thirteen colonies were so disparate that a joint colonial action was unlikely to occur against such a tax—an assumption that had its genesis in the failure of the Albany Conference in 1754. By the end of December 1764, the first warnings of serious colonial opposition were provided by pamphlets and petitions from the colonies protesting both the Sugar Act 1764 and the proposed stamp tax.

For Grenville, the first issue was the amount of the tax. Soon after his announcement of the possibility of a tax, he had told American agents that he was not opposed to the Americans suggesting an alternative way of raising the money themselves. However, the only other alternative would be to requisition each colony and allow them to determine how to raise their share. This had never worked before, even during the French and Indian War, and there was no political mechanism in place that would have ensured the success of such cooperation. On 2 February 1765, Grenville met to discuss the tax with Benjamin Franklin, Jared Ingersoll from New Haven, Richard Jackson, agent for Connecticut, and Charles Garth, the agent for South Carolina (Jackson and Garth were also members of Parliament). These colonial representatives had no specific alternative to present; they simply suggested that the determination be left to the colonies. Grenville replied that he wanted to raise the money "by means the most easy and least objectionable to the Colonies". Thomas Whately had drafted the Stamp Act, and he said that the delay in implementation had been "out of Tenderness to the colonies", and that the tax was judged as "the easiest, the most equal and the most certain." (Note: Ingersoll accepted a position of stamp distributor for Connecticut despite his opposition.)

The debate in Parliament began soon after this meeting. Petitions submitted by the colonies were officially ignored by Parliament. In the debate, Charles Townshend said,

"and now will these Americans, children planted by our care, nourished up by our Indulgence until they are grown to a degree of strength and opulence, and protected by our arms, will they grudge to contribute their mite to relieve us from heavy weight of the burden which we lie under?"

Colonel Isaac Barré responded:

They planted by your care? No! Your oppression planted 'em in America. They fled from your tyranny to a then uncultivated and unhospitable country where they exposed themselves to almost all the hardships to which human nature is liable, and among others to the cruelties of a savage foe, the most subtle, and I take upon me to say, the most formidable of any people upon the face of God's earth....

They nourished by your indulgence? They grew by your neglect of 'em. As soon as you began to care about 'em, that care was exercised in sending persons to rule over 'em, in one department and another, who were perhaps the deputies of deputies to some member of this house, sent to spy out their liberty, to misrepresent their actions and to prey upon 'em; men whose behaviour on many occasions has caused the blood of those sons of liberty to recoil within them....

They protected by your arms? They have nobly taken up arms in your defence, have exerted a valour amidst their constant and laborious industry for the defence of a country whose frontier while drenched in blood, its interior parts have yielded all its little savings to your emolument .... The people I believe are as truly loyal as any subjects the king has, but a people jealous of their liberties and who will vindicate them if ever they should be violated; but the subject is too delicate and I will say no more."

Massachusetts Royal Governor William Shirley assured London in 1755 that American independence could easily be defeated by force. He argued:

At all Events, they could not maintain such an Independency, without a Strong Naval Force, which it must forever be in the Power of Great Britain to hinder them from having: And whilst His Majesty hath 7000 Troops kept up within them, & in the Great Lakes upon the back of six of them, with the Indians at Command, it seems very easy, provided the Governors & principal Civil Officers are Independent of the Assemblies for their Subsistence, & commonly Vigilant, to prevent any Steps of that kind from being taken.

== The act ==
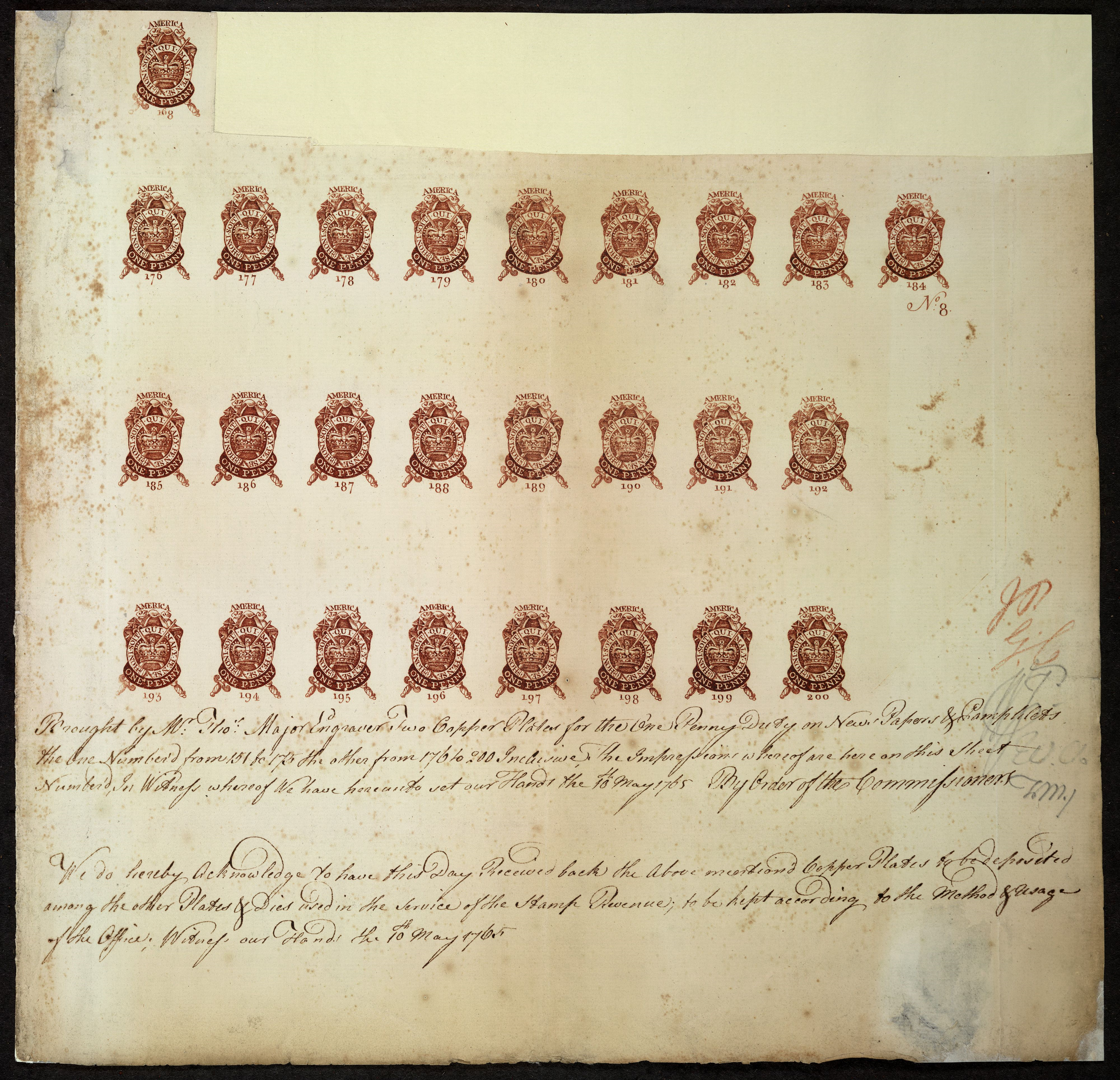
A proof sheet of one penny stamps submitted for approval to the Commissioners of Stamps by their engraver on May 10, 1765

The act was passed by the British Parliament on 22 March 1765 with an effective date of 1 November 1765. It passed 205–49 in the House of Commons and unanimously in the House of Lords. Historians Edmund and Helen Morgan describe the specifics of the tax:

The highest tax, £10, was placed ... on attorney licenses. Other papers relating to court proceedings were taxed in amounts varying from 3d. to 10s. Land grants under a hundred acres were taxed 1s. 6d., between 100 and 200 acres 2s., and from 200 to 320 acres 2s. 6d., with an additional 2s 6d. for every additional 320 acres (1.3 km^{2}). Cards were taxed a shilling a pack, dice ten shillings, and newspapers and pamphlets at the rate of a penny for a single sheet and a shilling for every sheet in pamphlets or papers totaling more than one sheet and fewer than six sheets in octavo, fewer than twelve in quarto, or fewer than twenty in folio (in other words, the tax on pamphlets grew in proportion to their size but ceased altogether if they became large enough to qualify as a book).

The high taxes on lawyers and college students were designed to limit the growth of a professional class in the colonies. The stamps had to be purchased with hard currency, which was scarce, rather than the more plentiful colonial paper currency. To avoid draining currency out of the colonies, the revenues were to be expended in America, especially for supplies and salaries of British Army units who were stationed there. (Note: Both the Morgans and Weslager note that the paper used had to be pre-stamped in England. Most paper came from there anyway, so there were "approximately fifty colonial papermakers who operated their own mills" who would suffer from decreased demand for their products.)

Two features of the act involving the courts attracted special attention. The tax on court documents specifically included courts "exercising ecclesiastical jurisdiction." These types of courts did not currently exist in the colonies and no bishops were currently assigned to the colonies, who would preside over the courts. Many colonists or their ancestors had fled England specifically to escape the influence and power of such state-sanctioned religious institutions, and they feared that this was the first step to reinstating the old ways in the colonies. Some Anglicans in the northern colonies were already openly advocating the appointment of such bishops, but they were opposed by both southern Anglicans and the non-Anglicans who made up the majority in the northern colonies.

The act allowed admiralty courts to have jurisdiction for trying violators, following the example established by the Sugar Act. However, admiralty courts had traditionally been limited to cases involving the high seas. The Sugar Act seemed to fall within this precedent, but the Stamp Act did not, and the colonists saw this as a further attempt to replace their local courts with courts controlled by Great Britain.

== Reactions ==
As the act imposed a tax on many different types of paper items, including newspapers, contracts, deeds, wills, claims, indentures and many other types of legal documents, its effect would be felt in many different professions and trades, resulting in widespread protests from newspapers, citizens, and even attacks on public officials, tax collectors and their offices and homes.

=== Political responses ===
Grenville started appointing stamp distributors almost immediately after the act passed Parliament. Applicants were not hard to come by because of the anticipated income that the positions promised, and he appointed local colonists to the post. Benjamin Franklin even suggested the appointment of John Hughes as the agent for Pennsylvania, indicating that even Franklin was not aware of the turmoil and impact that the tax was going to generate on American-British relations or that these distributors would become the focus of colonial resistance. (Note: Separate appointments were made for the three Canadian colonies (Quebec, Nova Scotia, and Newfoundland), one each for East and West Florida, and five for the islands of the West Indies.)

Debate in the colonies had actually begun in the spring of 1764 over the Stamp Act when Parliament passed a resolution that contained the assertion, "That, towards further defraying the said Expences, it may be proper to charge certain Stamp Duties in the said Colonies and Plantations." Both the Sugar Act and the proposed Stamp Act were designed principally to raise revenue from the colonists. The Sugar Act, to a large extent, was a continuation of past legislation related primarily to the regulation of trade (termed an external tax), but its stated purpose was entirely new: to collect revenue directly from the colonists for a specific purpose. The novelty of the Stamp Act was that it was the first internal tax (a tax based entirely on activities within the colonies) levied directly on the colonies by Parliament. It was judged by the colonists to be a more dangerous assault on their rights than the Sugar Act 1764 was, because of its potential wide application to the colonial economy.

The theoretical issue that soon held centre stage was the matter of taxation without representation. Benjamin Franklin had raised this as far back as 1754 at the Albany Congress when he wrote, "That it is suppos'd an undoubted Right of Englishmen not to be taxed but by their own Consent given thro' their Representatives. That the Colonies have no Representatives in Parliament." The counter to this argument was the theory of virtual representation. Thomas Whately enunciated this theory in a pamphlet that readily acknowledged that there could be no taxation without consent, but the facts were that at least 75% of British adult males were not represented in Parliament because of property qualifications or other factors. Members of Parliament were bound to represent the interests of all British citizens and subjects, so colonists were the recipients of virtual representation in Parliament, like those disenfranchised subjects in the British Isles. This theory, however, ignored a crucial difference between the unrepresented in Britain and the colonists. The colonists enjoyed actual representation in their own legislative assemblies, and the issue was whether these legislatures, rather than Parliament, were in fact the sole recipients of the colonists' consent with regard to taxation.

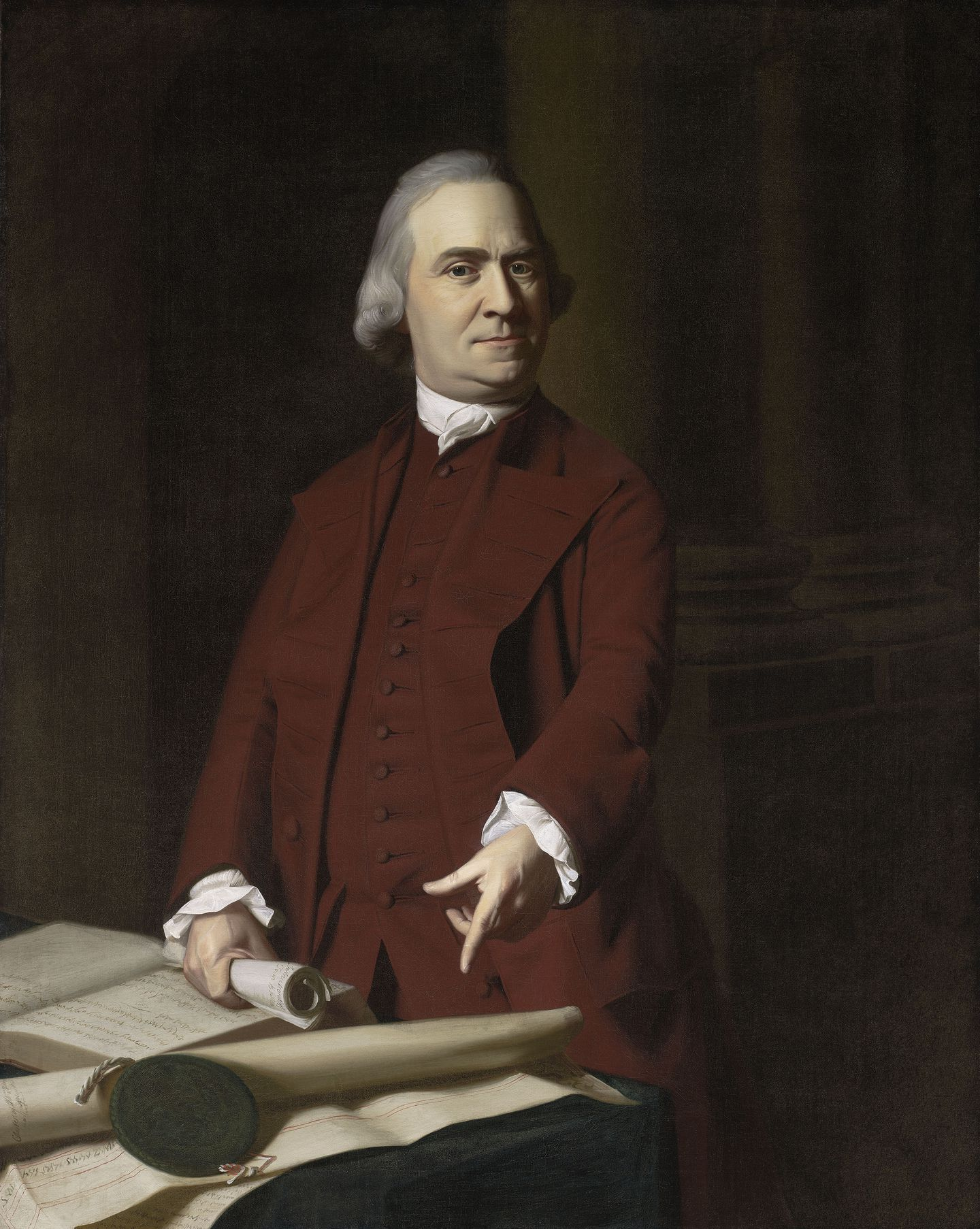
Samuel Adams opposed the act

In May 1764, Samuel Adams of Boston drafted the following that stated the common American position:

For if our Trade may be taxed why not our Lands? Why not the Produce of our Lands & every thing we possess or make use of? This we apprehend annihilates our Charter Right to govern & tax ourselves – It strikes our British Privileges, which as we have never forfeited them, we hold in common with our Fellow Subjects who are Natives of Britain: If Taxes are laid upon us in any shape without our having a legal Representation where they are laid, are we not reduced from the Character of free Subjects to the miserable State of tributary Slaves.

Massachusetts appointed a five-member Committee of Correspondence in June 1764 to coordinate action and exchange information regarding the Sugar Act, and Rhode Island formed a similar committee in October 1764. This attempt at unified action represented a significant step forward in colonial unity and cooperation. The Virginia House of Burgesses sent a protest of the taxes to London in December 1764, arguing that they did not have the specie required to pay the tax. Massachusetts, New York, New Jersey, Rhode Island, and Connecticut also sent protest to Britain in 1764. The content of the messages varied, but they all emphasised that taxation of the colonies without colonial assent was a violation of their rights. By the end of 1765, all of the Thirteen Colonies except Georgia and North Carolina (and Nova Scotia) had sent some sort of protest passed by colonial legislative assemblies.

The Virginia House of Burgesses reconvened in early May 1765 after news was received of the passage of the act. By the end of May, it appeared that they would not consider the tax, and many legislators went home, including George Washington. Only 30 out of 116 Burgesses remained, but one of those remaining was Patrick Henry, who was attending his first session. Henry led the opposition to the Stamp Act; he proposed his resolutions on 29 May 1765, and they were passed in the form of the Virginia Resolves. The Resolves stated:

Resolved, That the first Adventurers and Settlers of this his majesty's colony and Dominion of Virginia brought with them, and transmitted to their Posterity, and all other his Majesty's subjects since inhabiting in this his Majesty's said Colony, all the Liberties, privileges, Franchises, and Immunities that have at any Time been held, enjoyed, and possessed, by the People of Great Britain.

Resolved, That by the two royal Charters, granted by King James the First, the Colonists aforesaid are declared entitled to all Liberties, Privileges, and Immunities of Denizens and natural Subjects, to all Intents and Purposes, as if they had been abiding and born within the Realm of England.

Resolved, That the Taxation of the People by themselves, or by Persons chosen by themselves to represent them, who could only know what Taxes the People are able to bear, or the easiest method of raising them, and must themselves be affected by every Tax laid on the People, is the only Security against a burdensome Taxation, and the distinguishing characteristick of British Freedom, without which the ancient Constitution cannot exist.

Resolved, That his majesty's liege people of this his most ancient and loyal Colony have without interruption enjoyed the inestimable Right of being governed by such Laws, respecting their internal Polity and Taxation, as are derived from their own Consent, with the Approbation of their Sovereign, or his Substitute; and that the same hath never been forfeited or yielded up, but hath been constantly recognised by the King and People of Great Britain. (Note: The Resolves were widely reprinted and many versions of them are still seen. Middlekauff used the wording from the journal of the House of Burgesses.)

On 6 June 1765, the Massachusetts Lower House proposed a meeting for the 1st Tuesday of October in New York City:

That it is highly expedient there should be a Meeting as soon as may be, of Committees from the Houses of Representatives or Burgesses in the several Colonies on this Continent to consult together on the present Circumstances of the Colonies, and the difficulties to which they are and must be reduced by the operation of the late Acts of Parliament for levying Duties and Taxes on the Colonies, and to consider of a general and humble Address to his Majesty and the Parliament to implore Relief.

There was no attempt to keep this meeting a secret; Massachusetts promptly notified Richard Jackson of the proposed meeting, their agent in Britain and a member of Parliament.

=== Colonial newspapers ===
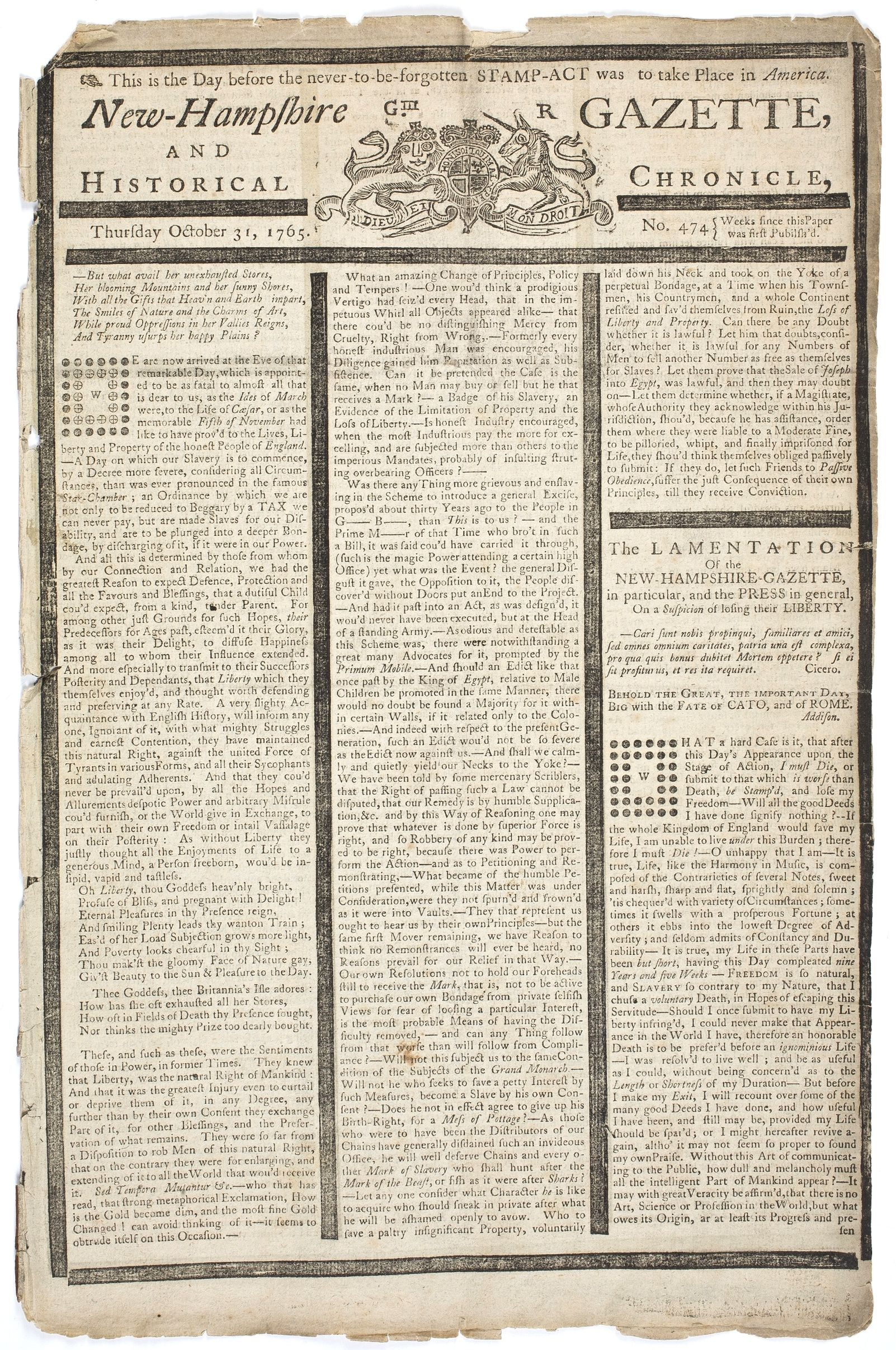
New Hampshire Gazette, October 31, 1765 issue, with black borders, protesting the coming of the Stamp Act

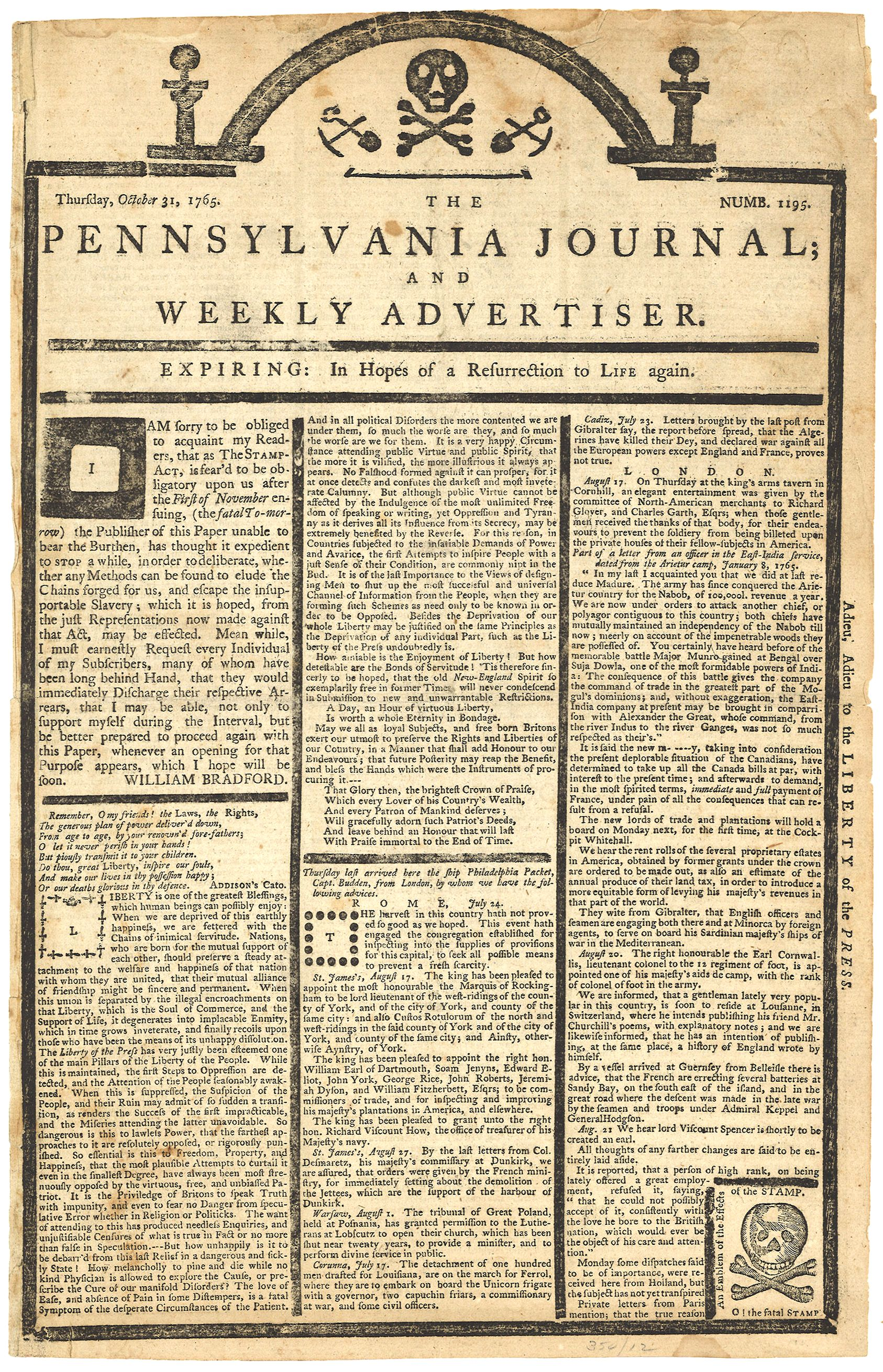
Pennsylvania Journal, October 31, 1765, issue, with black borders, protesting the stamp act

John Adams complained that the London ministry was intentionally trying "to strip us in a great measure of the means of knowledge, by loading the Press, the colleges, and even an Almanack and a News-Paper, with restraints and duties." The press fought back. By 1760 the fledgling American newspaper industry comprised 24 weekly papers in major cities. Benjamin Franklin had created an informal network so that each one routinely reprinted news, editorials, letters and essays from the others, thus helping form a common American voice. All the editors were annoyed at the new stamp tax they would have to pay on each copy. By informing colonists what the other colonies were saying, the press became a powerful opposition force to the Stamp Act. Many circumvented it and most equated taxation without representation with despotism and tyranny, thus providing a common vocabulary of protest for the Thirteen Colonies.

The August 1, 1768, issue of the Pennsylvania Chronicle, established by William Goddard, printed on the front page a four-column article of an address made at the State House (Independence Hall) against the Stamp Act, and other excessive tax laws passed without colonial representation in the British Parliament.

The newspapers reported effigy hangings and stamp master resignation speeches. Some newspapers were on the royal payroll and supported the act, but most of the press was free and vocal. Thus William Bradford, the foremost printer in Philadelphia, became a leader of the Sons of Liberty. He added a skull and crossbones with the words, "the fatal Stamp," to the masthead of his Pennsylvania Journal and weekly Advertiser.

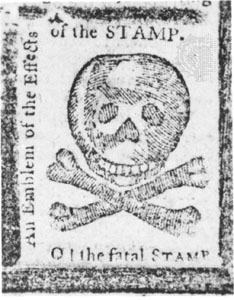
Bradford's Philadelphia paper gave a graphic warning

Some of the earliest forms of American propaganda appeared in these printings in response to the law. The articles written in colonial newspapers were particularly critical of the act because of the Stamp Act's disproportionate effect on printers. David Ramsay, a patriot and historian from South Carolina, wrote of this phenomenon shortly after the American Revolution:

It was fortunate for the liberties of America, that newspapers were the subject of a heavy stamp duty. Printers, when influenced by government, have generally arranged themselves on the side of liberty, nor are they less remarkable for attention to the profits of their profession. A stamp duty, which openly invaded the first, and threatened a great diminution of the last, provoked their united zealous opposition.

Most printers were critical of the Stamp Act, although a few Loyalist voices did exist. Some of the more subtle Loyalist sentiments can be seen in publications such as The Boston Evening Post, which was run by British sympathisers John and Thomas Fleet. The article detailed a violent protest that occurred in New York in December, 1765, then described the riot's participants as "imperfect" and labelled the group's ideas as "contrary to the general sense of the people." Vindex Patriae denigrated the colonists as foreign vagabonds and ungrateful Scots-Irish subjects determined to "strut and claim an independent property to the dunghill". Isaiah Thomas, when working for the Halifax Gazette in Nova Scotia, protested the act, however the newspaper largely complied. These Loyalists beliefs can be seen in some of the early newspaper articles about the Stamp Act, but the anti-British writings were more prevalent and seem to have had a more powerful effect.

Many papers assumed a relatively conservative tone before the act went into effect, implying that they might close if it wasn't repealed. However, as time passed and violent demonstrations ensued, the authors became more vitriolic. Several newspaper editors were involved with the Sons of Liberty, such as William Bradford of The Pennsylvania Journal and Benjamin Edes of The Boston Gazette, and they echoed the group's sentiments in their publications. The Stamp Act went into effect that November and many newspapers printed their editions with black borders about the edges and columns, which sometimes included imagery of tombstones and skeletons, emphasising that their papers were "dead" and would no longer be able to print because of the Stamp Act. However, most of them returned in the upcoming months, defiantly appearing without the stamp of approval that was deemed necessary by the Stamp Act. Printers were greatly relieved when the law was nullified in the following spring, and the repeal asserted their positions as a powerful voice (and compass) for public opinion.

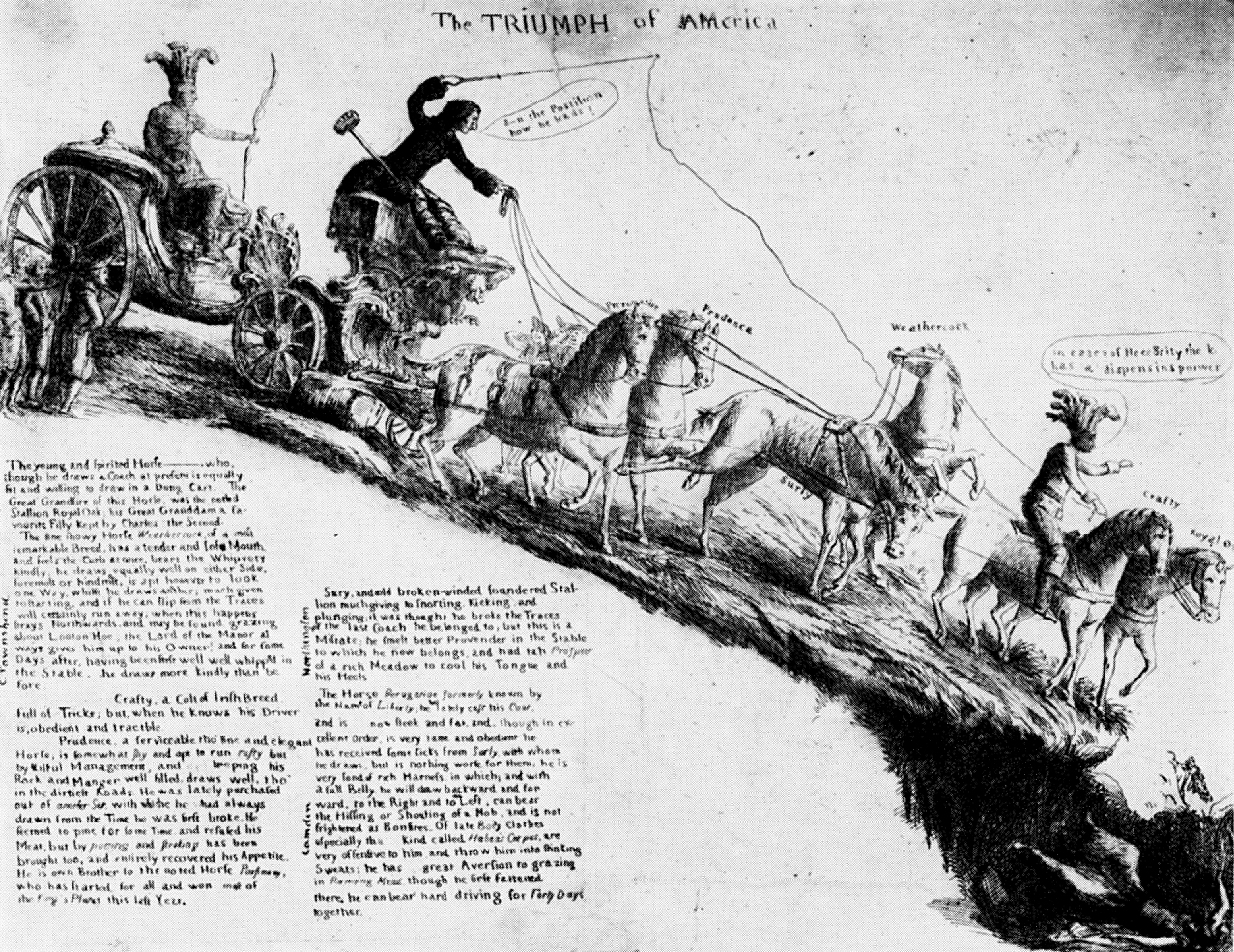
An English newspaper bewails the repeal of the Stamp Act

=== Protests in the streets ===
External videos
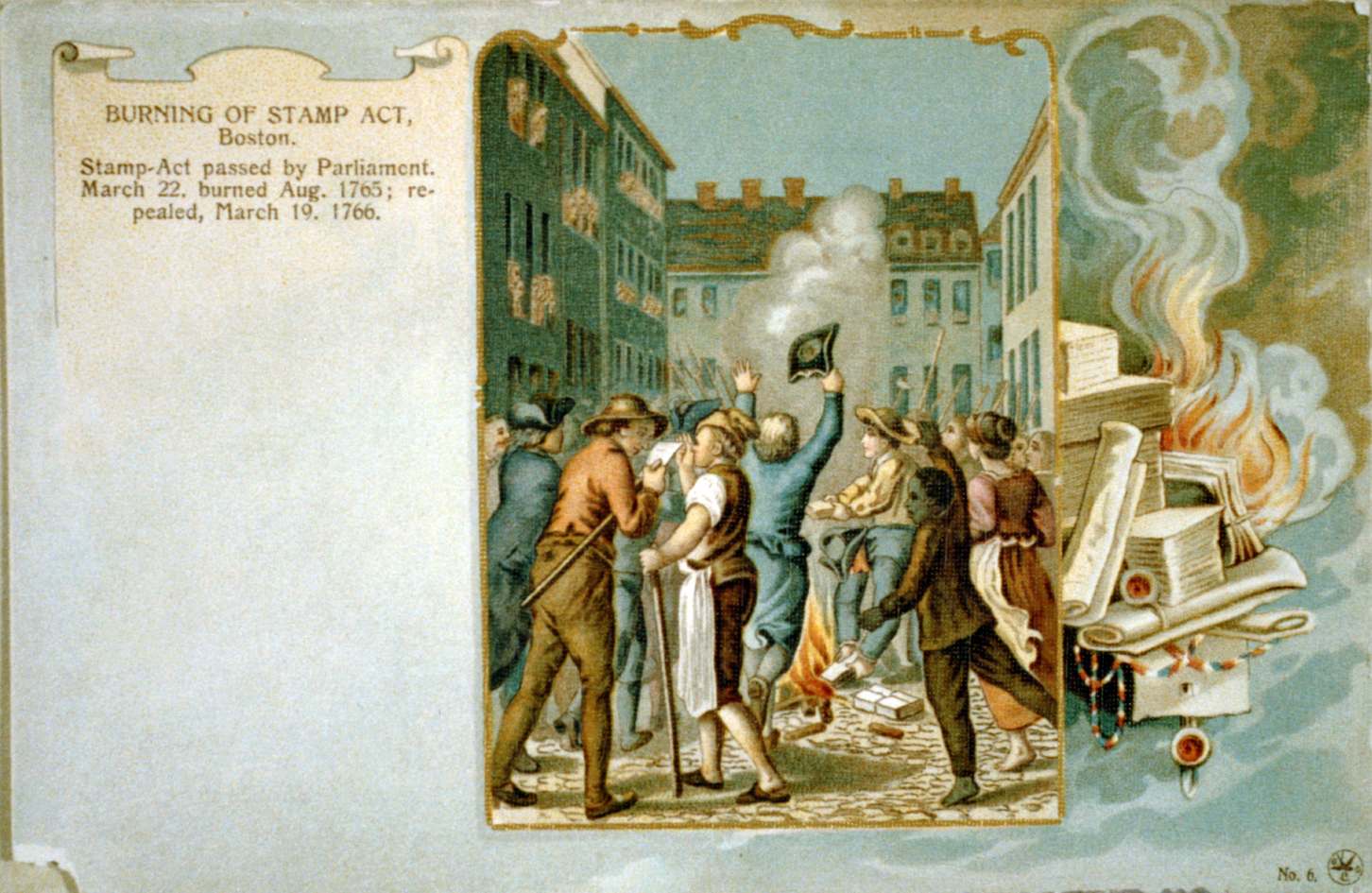
- The Stamp Act: Troubling Their Neighbors, 58:01, Benjamin L. Carp, WGBH Forum
- The Stamp Act: The Lowest Of The Mob, 49:35, Molly Fitzgerald Perry, WGBH Forum

While the colonial legislatures were acting, the ordinary citizens of the colonies were also voicing their concerns outside of this formal political process. Historian Gary B. Nash wrote:

Whether stimulated externally or ignited internally, ferment during the years from 1761 to 1766 changed the dynamics of social and political relations in the colonies and set in motion currents of reformist sentiment with the force of a mountain wind. Critical to this half-decade was the colonial response to England's Stamp Act, more the reaction of common colonists than that of their presumed leaders. Both loyal supporters of English authority and well-established colonial protest leaders underestimated the self-activating capacity of ordinary colonists. By the end of 1765 ... people in the streets had astounded, dismayed, and frightened their social superiors.

==== Maryland ====
A popular pamphlet condemning the Stamp Act was written by Maryland lawyer Daniel Dulany in 1765. It was named Considerations on the Propriety of Imposing Taxes in the British Colonies. In Pokomoke, Maryland, a tax collector was assaulted. In Talbot County, Maryland, a group of unknown citizens released "Resolutions of the Freemen of Talbot County Maryland" on November 25, 1765. This proclamation declared that they should enjoy the same rights as British subjects and condemned the Stamp Act. They also declared that they would erect a gallows in front of the county court house with an effigy of a "stamp informer" hung in chains, which would remain until the Stamp Act was repealed.

==== Massachusetts ====
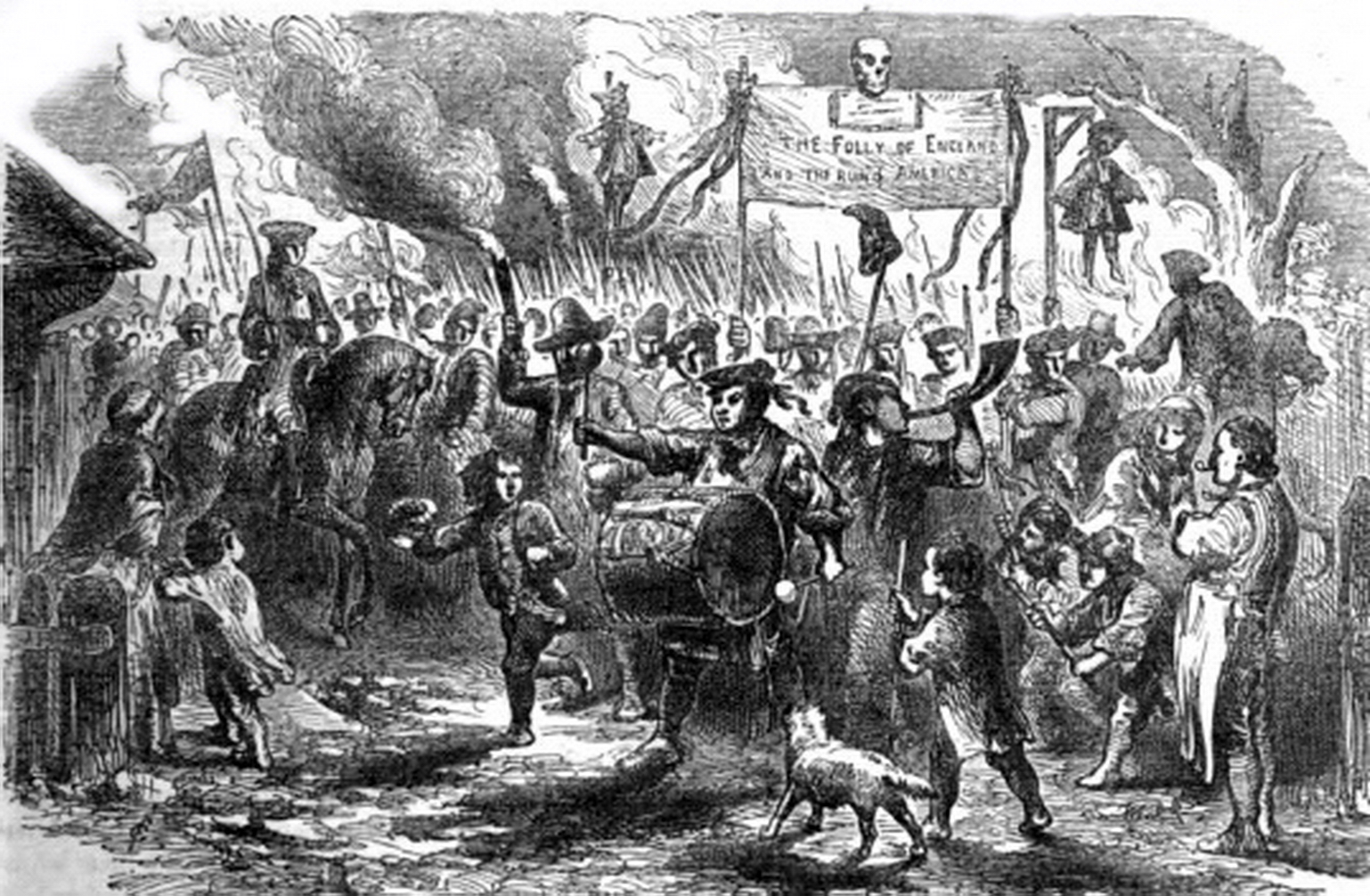
The Stamp Act rioters at Boston

Early street protests were most notable in Boston. Andrew Oliver was a distributor of stamps for Massachusetts who was hanged in effigy on 14 August 1765 "from a giant elm tree at the crossing of Essex and Orange Streets in the city's South End." Also hung was a jackboot painted green on the bottom ("a Green-ville sole"), a pun on both Grenville and the Earl of Bute, the two people most blamed by the colonists. Lieutenant Governor Thomas Hutchinson ordered sheriff Stephen Greenleaf to take down the effigy, but he was opposed by a large crowd. All day the crowd detoured merchants on Orange Street to have their goods symbolically stamped under the elm tree, which later became known as the "Liberty Tree". This date became accepted by the members of the Sons of Liberty in Boston as the date of the founding of their organisation.

Ebenezer MacIntosh was a veteran of the Seven Years' War and a shoemaker. One night, he led a crowd which cut down the effigy of Andrew Oliver and took it in a funeral procession to the Town House where the legislature met. From there, they went to Oliver's office – which they tore down and symbolically stamped the timbers. Next, they took the effigy to Oliver's home at the foot of Fort Hill, where they beheaded it and then burned it – along with Oliver's stable house and coach and chaise. Greenleaf and Hutchinson were stoned when they tried to stop the mob, which then looted and destroyed the contents of Oliver's house. Oliver asked to be relieved of his duties the next day. This resignation, however, was not enough. Oliver was ultimately forced by MacIntosh to be paraded through the streets and to publicly resign under the Liberty Tree.

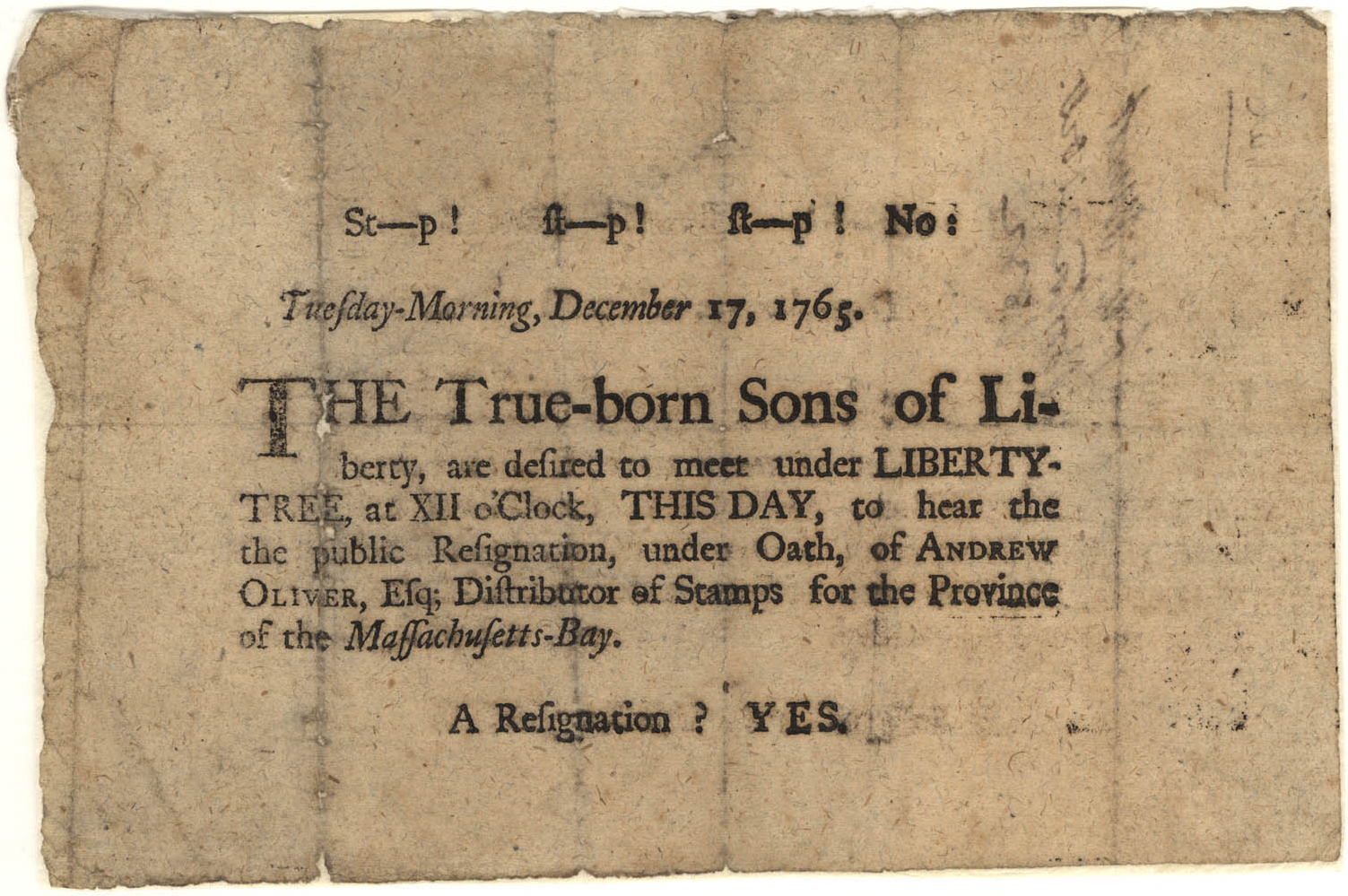
A 1765 broadside regarding the resignation of Andrew Oliver under the Liberty Tree

As news spread of the reasons for Andrew Oliver's resignation, violence and threats of aggressive acts increased throughout the colonies, as did organised groups of resistance. Throughout the colonies, members of the middle and upper classes of society formed the foundation for these groups of resistance and soon called themselves the Sons of Liberty. These colonial groups of resistance burned effigies of royal officials, forced Stamp Act collectors to resign, and were able to get businessmen and judges to go about without using the proper stamps demanded by Parliament.

On 16 August, a mob damaged the home and official papers of William Story, the deputy register of the Vice-Admiralty, who then moved to Marblehead, Massachusetts. Benjamin Hallowell, the comptroller of customs, suffered the almost total loss of his home.

On 26 August, MacIntosh led an attack on Hutchinson's mansion. The mob evicted the family, destroyed the furniture, tore down the interior walls, emptied the wine cellar, scattered Hutchinson's collection of Massachusetts historical papers, and pulled down the building's cupola. Hutchinson had been in public office for three decades; he estimated his loss at £2,218 (in today's money, at nearly $250,000). Nash concludes that this attack was more than just a reaction to the Stamp Act:

But it is clear that the crowd was giving vent to years of resentment at the accumulation of wealth and power by the haughty prerogative faction led by Hutchinson. Behind every swing of the ax and every hurled stone, behind every shattered crystal goblet and splintered mahogany chair, lay the fury of a plain Bostonian who had read or heard the repeated references to impoverished people as "rable" and to Boston's popular caucus, led by Samuel Adams, as a "herd of fools, tools, and synchophants."

Governor Francis Bernard offered a £300 reward for information on the leaders of the mob, but no information was forthcoming. MacIntosh and several others were arrested, but were either freed by pressure from the merchants or released by mob action.

The street demonstrations originated from the efforts of respectable public leaders such as James Otis, who commanded the Boston Gazette, and Samuel Adams of the "Loyal Nine" of the Boston Caucus, an organisation of Boston merchants. They made efforts to control the people below them on the economic and social scale, but they were often unsuccessful in maintaining a delicate balance between mass demonstrations and riots. These men needed the support of the working class, but also had to establish the legitimacy of their actions to have their protests to Britain taken seriously. At the time of these protests, the Loyal Nine was more of a social club with political interests but, by December 1765, it began issuing statements as the Sons of Liberty.

==== Rhode Island ====
Rhode Island also experienced street violence. A crowd built a gallows near the Town House in Newport on 27 August, where they carried effigies of three officials appointed as stamp distributors: Augustus Johnson, Dr. Thomas Moffat, and lawyer Martin Howard. The crowd at first was led by merchants William Ellery, Samuel Vernon, and Robert Crook, but they soon lost control. That night, the crowd was led by a poor man named John Weber, and they attacked the houses of Moffat and Howard, where they destroyed walls, fences, art, furniture, and wine. The local Sons of Liberty were publicly opposed to violence, and they refused at first to support Weber when he was arrested. They were persuaded to come to his assistance, however, when retaliation was threatened against their own homes. Weber was released and faded into obscurity.

Howard became the only prominent American to publicly support the Stamp Act in his pamphlet "A Colonist's Defence of Taxation" (1765). After the riots, Howard had to leave the colony, but he was rewarded by the Crown with an appointment as Chief Justice of North Carolina at a salary of £1,000.

==== New York ====
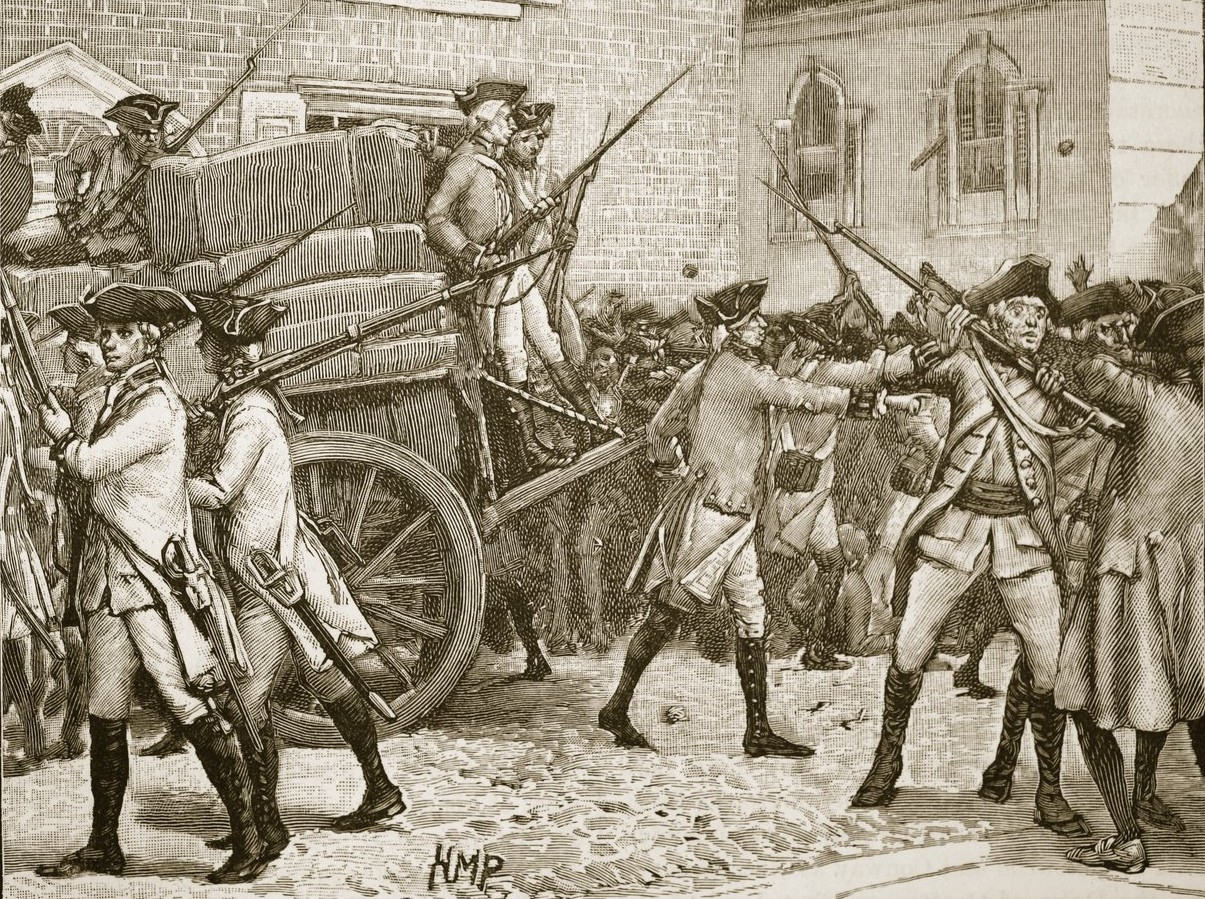
Troops escorting the stamped paper to the City Hall New York in 1766

In New York, James McEvers resigned his distributorship four days after the attack on Hutchinson's house. The first shipment of stamps for New York and Connecticut arrived at New York Harbor on 24 October, greeted by a huge crowd of angry colonists, and were kept at Fort George for safe keeping. Placards appeared throughout the city warning that, "the first man that either distributes or makes use of stamped paper let him take care of his house, person, and effects." New York merchants met on 31 October and agreed not to sell any English goods until the act was repealed. Crowds took to the streets for four days of demonstrations, uncontrolled by the local leaders, culminating in an attack by two thousand people on Governor Cadwallader Colden's home and the burning of two sleighs and a coach. Various stamp masters, including Zachariah Hood from Maryland, fled to Fort George out of concern for their safety. Unrest in New York City continued through the end of the year, and the local Sons of Liberty had difficulty in controlling crowd actions. Sir Henry Moore, who replaced Colden as provincial governor of New York, met with the influential Isaac Sears, a leader of the Sons of Liberty, in an effort to maintain peace and restore order to the city. Shortly thereafter Moore opened the gates of the fort as a gesture of good faith and invited people in.

==== Virginia ====
During the Stamp Act 1765 crisis, Archibald McCall (1734–1814) sided against patriots in Westmoreland and Essex County, Virginia. He insisted on collecting the British tax that was placed on stamps and other documents. In reaction, a mob formed and stormed his house in Tappahannock, Virginia. They threw rocks through the windows and McCall was captured, tarred and feathered. The act was an example of "taxation without representation" and a leading event to the war against the British.

==== Other Colonies ====
In Frederick, Maryland, a court of 12 magistrates ruled the Stamp Act invalid on 23 November 1765, and directed that businesses and colonial officials proceed in all matters without use of the stamps. A week later, a crowd conducted a mock funeral procession for the act in the streets of Frederick. The magistrates have been dubbed the "12 Immortal Justices," and 23 November has been designated "Repudiation Day" by the Maryland state legislature. On 1 October 2015, Senator Cardin (D-MD) read into the Congressional Record a statement noting 2015 as the 250th anniversary of the event. Among the 12 magistrates was William Luckett, who later served as lieutenant colonel in the Maryland Militia at the Battle of Germantown.

Other popular demonstrations occurred in Portsmouth, New Hampshire; Annapolis, Maryland; Wilmington and New Bern, North Carolina; and Charleston, South Carolina. In Philadelphia, Pennsylvania demonstrations were subdued but even targeted Benjamin Franklin's home, although it was not vandalised. By 16 November, twelve of the stamp distributors had resigned. The Georgia distributor did not arrive in America until January 1766, but his first and only official action was to resign.

The overall effect of these protests was to both anger and unite the American people like never before. Opposition to the act inspired both political and constitutional forms of literature throughout the colonies, strengthened the colonial political perception and involvement, and created new forms of organised resistance. These organised groups quickly learned that they could force royal officials to resign by employing violent measures and threats.

==== Quebec, Nova Scotia, Newfoundland, and the Caribbean ====
The main issue was the constitutional rights of Englishmen, so the French in Quebec did not react. Some English-speaking merchants were opposed but were in a fairly small minority. The Quebec Gazette ceased publication until the act was repealed, apparently over the unwillingness to use stamped paper. In neighbouring Nova Scotia a number of former New England residents objected, but recent British immigrants and London-oriented business interests based in Halifax, the provincial capital were more influential. The only major public protest was the hanging in effigy of the stamp distributor and Lord Bute. The act was implemented in both provinces, but Nova Scotia's stamp distributor resigned in January 1766, beset by ungrounded fears for his safety. Authorities there were ordered to allow ships bearing unstamped papers to enter its ports, and business continued unabated after the distributors ran out of stamps. The act occasioned some protests in Newfoundland, and the drafting of petitions opposing not only the Stamp Act, but the existence of the customhouse at St. John's, based on legislation dating back to the reign of Edward VI forbidding any sort of duties on the importation of goods related to its fisheries.

Violent protests were few in the Caribbean colonies. Political opposition was expressed in a number of colonies, including Barbados and Antigua, and by absentee landowners living in Britain. The worst political violence took place on St. Kitts and Nevis. Riots took place on 31 October 1765, and again on 5 November, targeting the homes and offices of stamp distributors; the number of participants suggests that the percentage of St. Kitts' white population involved matched that of Bostonian involvement in its riots. The delivery of stamps to St. Kitts was successfully blocked, and they were never used there. Montserrat and Antigua also succeeded in avoiding the use of stamps; some correspondents thought that rioting was prevented in Antigua only by the large troop presence. Despite vocal political opposition, Barbados used the stamps, to the pleasure of King George. In Jamaica there was also vocal opposition, which included threats of violence. There was much evasion of the stamps, and ships arriving without stamped papers were allowed to enter port. Despite this, Jamaica produced more stamp revenue (£2,000) than any other colony.

==== Sons of Liberty ====
It was during this time of street demonstrations that locally organised groups started to merge into an inter-colonial organisation of a type not previously seen in the colonies. The term "sons of liberty" had been used in a generic fashion well before 1765, but it was only around February 1766 that its influence extended throughout the colonies as an organised group using the formal name "Sons of Liberty", leading to a pattern for future resistance to the British that carried the colonies towards 1776. (Note: Maier noted that the term "sons of liberty", used in the generic sense, was used as early as the 1750s in some Connecticut documents.) Historian John C. Miller noted that the name was adopted as a result of Barre's use of the term in his February 1765 speech.

The organisation spread month by month after independent starts in several different colonies. By 6 November, a committee was set up in New York to correspond with other colonies, and in December an alliance was formed between groups in New York and Connecticut. In January, a correspondence link was established between Boston and Manhattan, and by March, Providence had initiated connections with New York, New Hampshire, and Newport. By March, Sons of Liberty organisations had been established in New Jersey, Maryland, and Norfolk, Virginia, and a local group established in North Carolina was attracting interest in South Carolina and Georgia.

The officers and leaders of the Sons of Liberty "were drawn almost entirely from the middle and upper ranks of colonial society," but they recognised the need to expand their power base to include "the whole of political society, involving all of its social or economic subdivisions." To do this, the Sons of Liberty relied on large public demonstrations to expand their base. They learned early on that controlling such crowds was problematical, although they strived to control "the possible violence of extra-legal gatherings". The organisation professed its loyalty to both local and British established government, but possible military action as a defensive measure was always part of their considerations. Throughout the Stamp Act Crisis, the Sons of Liberty professed continued loyalty to the King because they maintained a "fundamental confidence" that Parliament would do the right thing and repeal the tax. (Note: Miller wrote, "Had Great Britain attempted to enforce the Stamp Act, there can be little doubt that British troops and embattled Americans would have shed each other's blood ten years before Lexington. As Benjamin Franklin remarked, a British army would not have found a rebellion in the American colonies in 1765 but it would have made one.")

=== Stamp Act Congress ===
The Stamp Act Congress was held in New York in October 1765. Twenty-seven delegates from nine colonies were the members of the Congress, and their responsibility was to draft a set of formal petitions stating why Parliament had no right to tax them. Among the delegates were many important men in the colonies. Historian John Miller observes, "The composition of this Stamp Act Congress ought to have been convincing proof to the British government that resistance to parliamentary taxation was by no means confined to the riffraff of colonial seaports."

The youngest delegate was 26-year-old John Rutledge of South Carolina, and the oldest was 65-year-old Hendrick Fisher of New Jersey. Ten of the delegates were lawyers, ten were merchants, and seven were planters or land-owning farmers; all had served in some type of elective office, and all but three were born in the colonies. Four died before the colonies declared independence, and four signed the Declaration of Independence; nine attended the first and second Continental Congresses, and three were Loyalists during the Revolution.

New Hampshire declined to send delegates, and North Carolina, Georgia, and Virginia were not represented because their governors did not call their legislatures into session, thus preventing the selection of delegates. Despite the composition of the congress, each of the Thirteen Colonies eventually affirmed its decisions. Six of the nine colonies represented at the Congress agreed to sign the petitions to the King and Parliament produced by the Congress. The delegations from New York, Connecticut, and South Carolina were prohibited from signing any documents without first receiving approval from the colonial assemblies that had appointed them.

Massachusetts governor Francis Bernard believed that his colony's delegates to the Congress would be supportive of Parliament. Timothy Ruggles in particular was Bernard's man, and was elected chairman of the Congress. Ruggles' instructions from Bernard were to "recommend submission to the Stamp Act until Parliament could be persuaded to repeal it." Many delegates felt that a final resolution of the Stamp Act would actually bring Britain and the colonies closer together. Robert Livingston of New York stressed the importance of removing the Stamp Act from the public debate, writing to his colony's agent in Britain, "If I really wished to see America in a state of independence I should desire as one of the most effectual means to that end that the stamp act should be enforced."

The Congress met for 12 consecutive days, including Sundays. There was no audience at the meetings, and no information was released about the deliberations. The meeting's final product was called "The Declaration of Rights and Grievances", and was drawn up by delegate John Dickinson of Pennsylvania. This Declaration raised fourteen points of colonial protest. It asserted that colonists possessed all the rights of Englishmen in addition to protesting the Stamp Act issue, and that Parliament could not represent the colonists since they had no voting rights over Parliament. Only the colonial assemblies had a right to tax the colonies. They also asserted that the extension of authority of the admiralty courts to non-naval matters represented an abuse of power. However, the congress still remained fairly respectful towards the king.

In addition to simply arguing for their rights as Englishmen, the congress also asserted that they had certain natural rights solely because they were human beings. Resolution 3 stated, "That it is inseparably essential to the freedom of a people, and the undoubted right of Englishmen, that no taxes be imposed on them, but with their own consent, given personally, or by their representatives." Both Massachusetts and Pennsylvania brought forth the issue in separate resolutions even more directly when they respectively referred to "the Natural rights of Mankind" and "the common rights of mankind". (Note: "Thus by the fall of 1765 the colonists had clearly laid down the line where they believed that Parliament should stop, and they had drawn that line not merely as Englishmen but as men.")

Christopher Gadsden of South Carolina had proposed that the Congress' petition should go only to the king, since the rights of the colonies did not originate with Parliament. This radical proposal went too far for most delegates and was rejected. The "Declaration of Rights and Grievances" was duly sent to the king, and petitions were also sent to both Houses of Parliament.

== Repeal ==
Grenville was replaced by Lord Rockingham as prime minister on 10 July 1765. News of the mob violence began to reach Britain in October. Conflicting sentiments were taking hold in Britain at the same time that resistance was building and accelerating in America. Some wanted to strictly enforce the Stamp Act 1765 over colonial resistance, wary of the precedent that would be set by backing down. Others felt the economic effects of reduced trade with America after the Sugar Act 1764 (4 Geo. 3. c. 15) and an inability to collect debts while the colonial economy suffered, and they began to lobby for a repeal of the Stamp Act 1765. The colonial protest had included various non-importation agreements among merchants who recognised that a significant portion of British industry and commerce was dependent on the colonial market. This movement had also spread through the colonies; 200 merchants had met in New York City and agreed to import nothing from Great Britain until the Stamp Act 1765 was repealed.

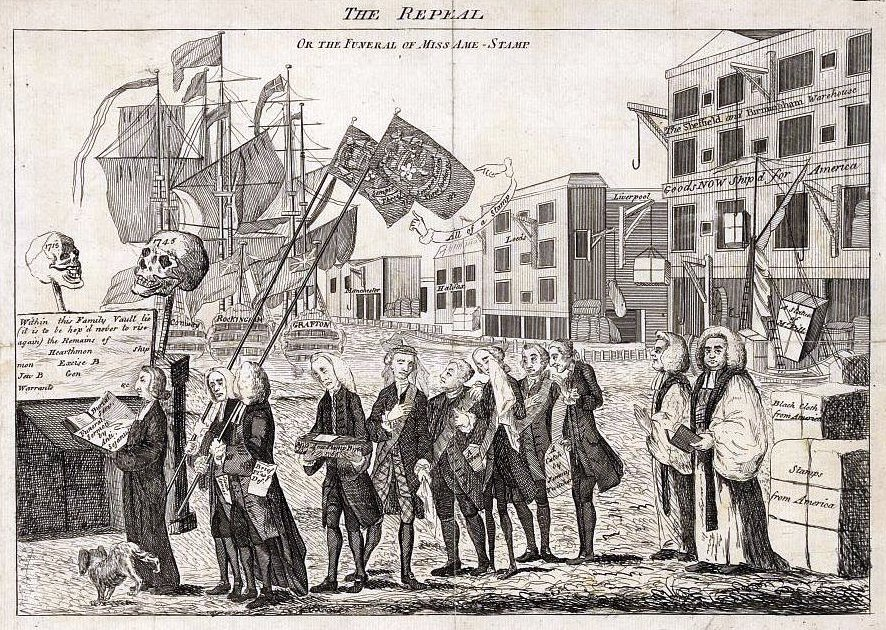
This cartoon depicts the repeal of the Stamp Act 1765 as a funeral, with Grenville carrying a child's coffin marked "born 1765, died 1766"

When Parliament met in December 1765, it rejected a resolution offered by Grenville that would have condemned colonial resistance to the enforcement of the act. Outside of Parliament, Rockingham and his secretary Edmund Burke, a member of Parliament himself, organised London merchants who started a committee of correspondence to support repeal of the Stamp Act 1765 by urging merchants throughout the country to contact their local representatives in Parliament. When Parliament reconvened on 14 January 1766, the Rockingham ministry formally proposed repeal. Amendments were considered that would have lessened the financial impact on the colonies by allowing colonists to pay the tax in their own scrip, but this was viewed to be too little and too late. (Note: Miller wrote of the Rockingham ministry, "Of all the Whig factions, the Rockinghams were most benevolent toward the colonies. While they were as determined ... as [other factions] to maintain the sovereignty of great Britain, they insisted [that] the Americans must be treated as customers rather than as rebellious rogues who merited a sound whipping.")

William Pitt stated in the parliamentary debate that everything done by the Grenville ministry "has been entirely wrong" with respect to the colonies. He further stated, "It is my opinion that this Kingdom has no right to lay a tax upon the colonies." Pitt still maintained "the authority of this kingdom over the colonies, to be sovereign and supreme, in every circumstance of government and legislature whatsoever," but he made the distinction that taxes were not part of governing, but were "a voluntary gift and grant of the Commons alone." He rejected the notion of virtual representation, as "the most contemptible idea that ever entered into the head of man."

Grenville responded to Pitt:

Protection and obedience are reciprocal. Great Britain protects America; America is bound to yield obedience. If, not, tell me when the Americans were emancipated? When they want the protection of this kingdom, they are always ready to ask for it. That protection has always been afforded them in the most full and ample manner. The nation has run itself into an immense debt to give them their protection; and now they are called upon to contribute a small share towards the public expence, and expence arising from themselves, they renounce your authority, insult your officers, and break out, I might also say, into open rebellion.

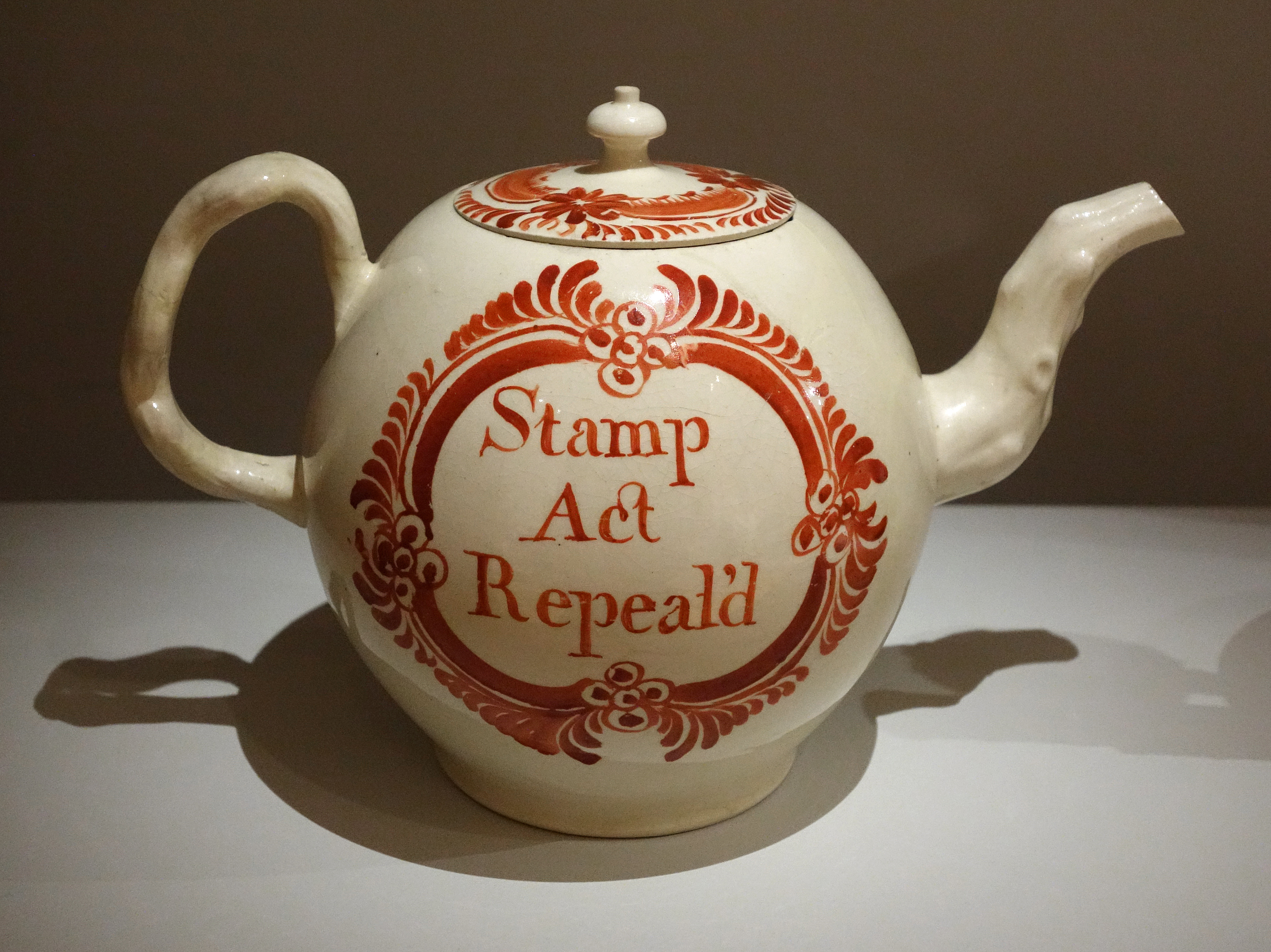
Teapot commemorating the repeal of the Stamp Act 1765

Pitt's response to Grenville included, "I rejoice that America has resisted. Three millions of people, so dead to all the feelings of liberty as voluntarily to submit to be slaves, would have been fit instruments to make slaves of the rest."

Between 17 and 27 January, Rockingham shifted the attention from constitutional arguments to economic by presenting petitions complaining of the economic repercussions felt throughout the country. On 7 February, the House of Commons rejected a resolution by 274–134, saying that it would back the king in enforcing the act. Henry Seymour Conway, the government's leader in the House of Commons, introduced the Declaratory Act 1766 in an attempt to address both the constitutional and the economic issues, which affirmed the right of Parliament to legislate for the colonies "in all cases whatsoever", while admitting the inexpediency of attempting to enforce the Stamp Act. Only Pitt and three or four others voted against it. Other resolutions passed which condemned the riots and demanded compensation from the colonies for those who suffered losses because of the actions of the mobs.

The House of Commons heard testimony between 11 and 13 February, the most important witness being Benjamin Franklin on the last day of the hearings. He responded to the question about how the colonists would react if the act was not repealed: "A total loss of the respect and affection the people of America bear to this country, and of all the commerce that depends on that respect and affection." A Scottish journalist observed Franklin's answers to Parliament and his effect on the repeal; he later wrote to Franklin, "To this very Examination, more than to any thing else, you are indebted to the speedy and total Repeal of this odious Law."

A repealing bill was introduced on 21 February to repeal the act, and it passed by a vote of 276–168. The king gave royal assent to the resulting Duties in American Colonies Act 1766 (6 Geo. 3. c. 11) on 18 March 1766. To celebrate the repeal, the Sons of Liberty in Dedham, Massachusetts erected the Pillar of Liberty with a bust of Pitt on top.

== Subsequent developments ==
Some aspects of the resistance to the act provided a sort of rehearsal for similar acts of resistance to the 1767 Townshend Acts, particularly the activities of the Sons of Liberty and merchants in organising opposition. The Stamp Act Congress was a predecessor to the later Continental Congresses, notably the Second Continental Congress which oversaw the establishment of American independence. The Committees of Correspondence used to coordinate activities were revived between 1772 and 1774 in response to a variety of controversial and unpopular affairs, and the colonies that met at the 1774 First Continental Congress established a non-importation agreement known as the Continental Association in response to Parliamentary passage of the Intolerable Acts.

== Surviving examples ==
Very few of the actual stamps are believed to have survived. The Smithsonian has an example of the most common issue, 2 shillings and 6 pence, and estimated that no more than 50 of this denomination still exist, with 42 confirmed. Most of them are individual copies and not on documents. It speculates that these were printed but never issued and were later found. Its own copy is from the estate of a tax commissioner. A philatelic newsletter estimated that about 55 documents with stamps are in existence, as well as 50 cut squares of various denominations. Some of the authorized values are unknown in any collection and may never have been printed except perhaps as proofs.

== See also ==
- American Revolutionary War
- Board of Inland Revenue Stamping Department Archive
- British Library Philatelic Collections
- Early American publishers and printers
- Revenue stamps of the United States

== Bibliography and further reading ==
- Adair, Douglass (1953). "The Stamp Act in Contemporary English Cartoons". William and Mary Quarterly. 10 (4): 538–542. doi:10.2307/1923593. JSTOR 1923593.
- Adair, Douglass; Schultz, John A. (1961). Peter Oliver's Origin and Progress of the American Rebellion: A Tory View. The Huntington Library. p. 52.
- Alexander, John K. (2002). Samuel Adams: America's Revolutionary Politician. Rowman & Littlefield. ISBN 978-0-7425-21155.
- Beer, George Louis (1907). British Colonial Policy, 1754–1765. Macmillan. p. 266. Reprint: ISBN 9780722265857.
- Clark, Ronald W. (1983). Benjamin Franklin: A Biography. Random House. ISBN 0394502221.
- Draper, Theodore (1996). A Struggle for Power: The American Revolution. Times Books. ISBN 0812925750.
- Engelman, F. L. (October 1953). "Cadwallader Colden and the New York Stamp Act Riots". The William and Mary Quarterly. 10 (4). Omohundro Institute of Early American History and Culture: 560–578. doi:10.2307/1923595. JSTOR 1923595.
- Ferling, John (2003). A Leap in the Dark: The Struggle to Create the American Republic. ISBN 9780195176001.
- Findling, John E.; Thackeray, Frank W. (1998). Events That Changed America in the Eighteenth Century. Greenwood Press.
- Hutchins, Zachary McLeod (2016). Community without Consent: New Perspectives on the Stamp Act. University Press of New England. p. 264.
- Hoffer, Peter Charles (2015). Benjamin Franklin Explains the Stamp Act Protests to Parliament, 1766, with documents
- Hosmer, John Kendall (1896). The Life of Thomas Hutchinson. Boston: Houghton, Mifflin. OCLC 1527164.
- Knollenberg, Bernhard (1975). Growth of the American Revolution, 1766–1775. New York: Free Press. ISBN 978-0-02917-110-3. OCLC 979186.
- Maier, Pauline (1991) [1972; original publication]. From Resistance to Revolution: Colonial radicals and the development of American opposition to Britain, 1765–1776. ISBN 0393308251.
- Middlekauff, Robert (2005). The Glorious Cause: The American Revolution, 1763–1789. ISBN 9780195162479.
- Miller, John C. (1943). Origins of the American Revolution.
- Morgan, Edmund S. (July 1948). "Colonial Ideas of Parliamentary Power 1764–1766". William and Mary Quarterly. 5 (3): 311–341. doi:10.2307/1923462. JSTOR 1923462.
- Morgan, Edmund S.; Morgan, Helen M. (1963). The Stamp Act Crisis: Prologue to Revolution.
- Nash, Gary B. (2006). The Unknown American Revolution: The Unruly Birth of Democracy and the Struggle to Create America. Penguin. ISBN 9780143037200.
- Ranlet, Philip (1986). The New York loyalists. Knoxville: University of Tennessee Press. ISBN 978-0-87049-5038.
- Reid, John Phillip (1987). Constitutional History of the American Revolution: The Authority to Tax. Madison, Wisconsin: University of Wisconsin Press. ISBN 029911290X.
- Schlesinger, Arthur M. (March 1935). "The Colonial Newspapers and the Stamp Act". The New England Quarterly. 8 (1). The New England Quarterly, Inc.: 63–83. doi:10.2307/359430. JSTOR 359430.
- Thomas, Peter D. G. (1975). British Politics and the Stamp Act Crisis: The First Phase of the American Revolution, 1763–1767. Oxford: Clarendon Press. ISBN 0198224311.
- Tilghman, Oswald; Harrison, Samuel A. (1915). History of Talbot County, Maryland, 1661–1861, Volume II. Baltimore, Maryland: Williams and Wilkins Company. OCLC 1541072. Archived from the original on 17 December 2021.
- Weslager, C. A. (1976). The Stamp Act Congress. University of Delaware Press. ISBN 0874131111.
