= Molasses Act =

Act of the Parliament of Great Britain

Trade of Sugar Colonies Act 1732
- Act of Parliament
- Parliament of Great Britain
- Long title: An act for the better securing and encouraging the trade of his Majesty's sugar colonies in America.
- Citation: 6 Geo. 2. c. 13
- Introduced by: The Rt Hon. Sir Robert Walpole, KG, KB, MP (Commons)
- Territorial extent: Great Britain; British America and the British West Indies

Dates
- Royal assent: 17 May 1733
- Commencement: 24 June 1733: in part; 25 December 1733: entire act; (Note: Section 1.)
- Repealed: 15 July 1867
Other legislation
Amended by	Continuance of Laws Act 1737; Growth of Coffee Act 1745; Continuance of Laws, etc. Act 1753; Sugar Colonies, etc. Act 1756; Passage from Charing Cross Act 1757; Sugar Act 1763; Customs Law Repeal Act 1825
Repealed by	Statute Law Revision Act 1867

Status: Repealed

Text of statute as originally enacted

The Molasses Act 1733 (6 Geo. 2. c. 13), also known as the Trade of Sugar Colonies Act 1732, was an act of the Parliament of Great Britain that imposed a tax of six pence per gallon on imports of molasses from non-British colonies. Parliament created the act largely at the insistence of large plantation owners in the British West Indies. The act was passed not to raise revenue but to regulate trade by making British products cheaper than those from the French West Indies. The act greatly affected the significant colonial molasses trade.

Merchants purchased raw sugar (often in its liquid form, molasses) from plantations in the Caribbean and shipped it to New England and Europe, where it was sold to distillery companies that produced rum. Merchant capitalists used cash in New England from the sale of sugar to purchase rum, furs, and lumber, which their crews shipped to Europe. With the profits from the European sales, merchants purchased Europe's manufactured goods, including tools and weapons; on the next leg, they shipped those manufactured goods, along with the American sugar and rum, to West Africa, where they bartered the goods for slaves seized by local potentates. The crews then transported the slaves to the Caribbean and sold them to sugar plantation owners. The cash from the sale of slaves in Brazil, the Caribbean islands, and the American South was used to buy more raw materials, restarting the cycle. The full triangle trip took a calendar year on average, according to the historian Clifford Shipton.

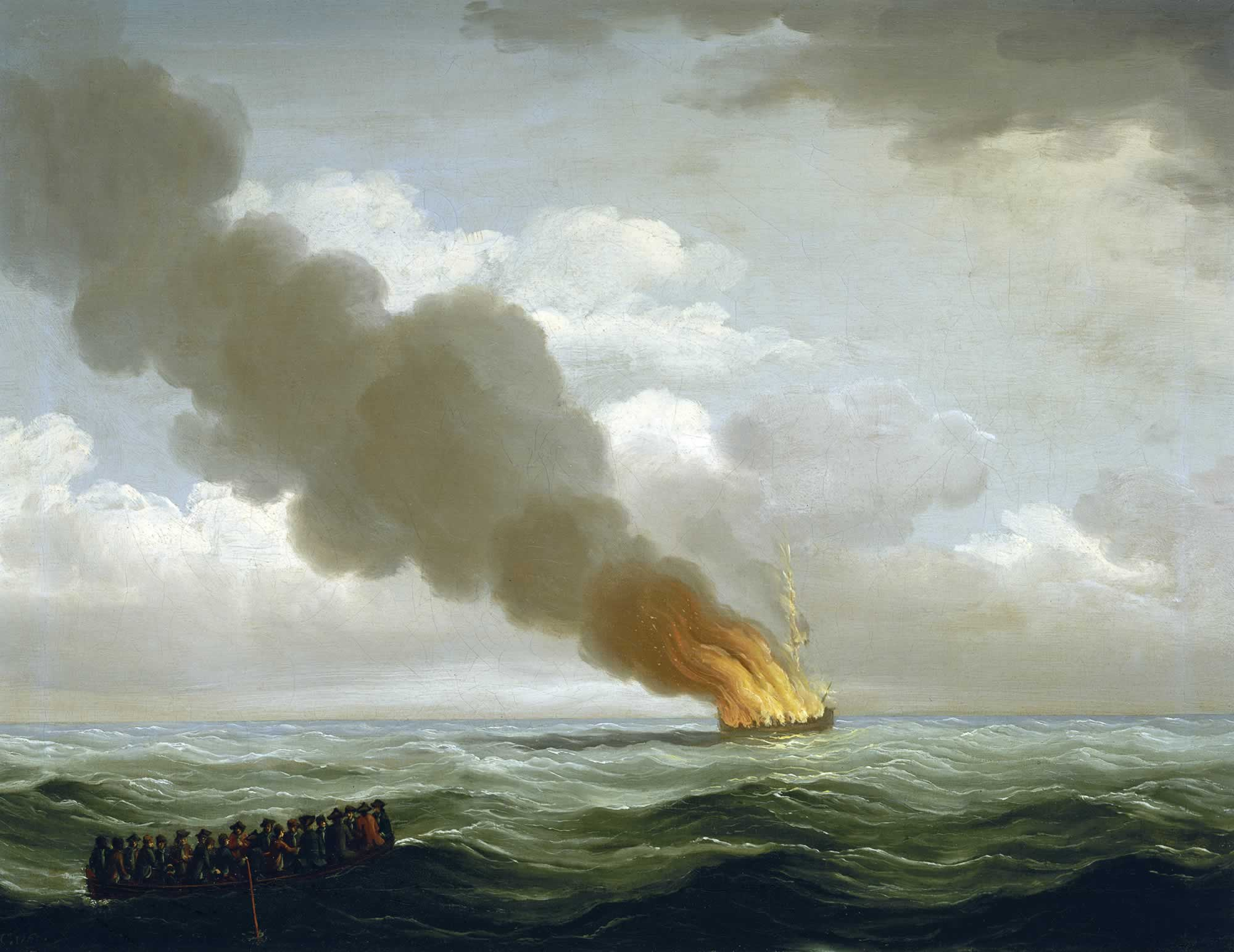
The loss of the slave ship Luxborough Galley in 1727 ("I.C. 1760"), lost in the last leg of the triangular trade, between the Caribbean and Britain.

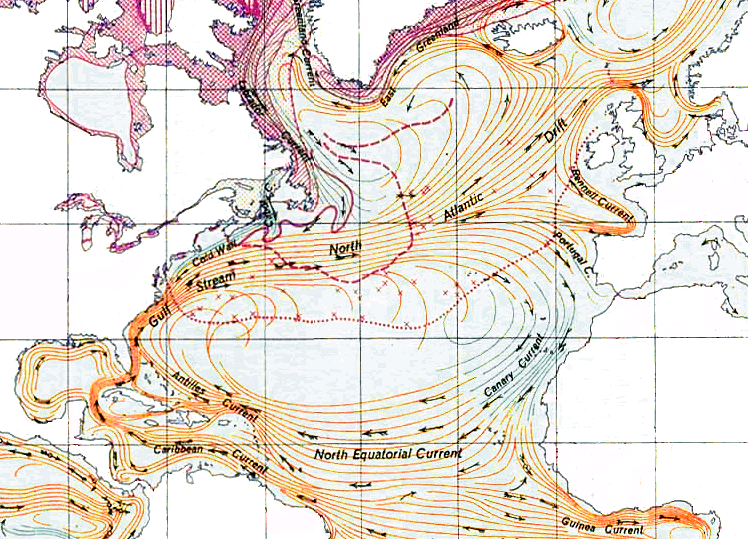
North Atlantic Gyre

The first leg of the triangle was from a European port to Africa, in which ships carried supplies for sale and trade, such as copper, cloth, trinkets, slave beads, guns and ammunition. When the ship arrived, its cargo would be sold or bartered for slaves. On the second leg, ships made the journey of the Middle Passage from Africa to the New World. Many slaves died of disease in the crowded holds of the slave ships. Once the ship reached the New World, enslaved survivors were sold in the Caribbean or the American colonies. The ships were then prepared to get them thoroughly cleaned, drained, and loaded with export goods for a return voyage, the third leg, to their home port, from the West Indies the main export cargoes were sugar, rum, and molasses; from Virginia, tobacco and hemp. The ship then returned to Europe to complete the triangle.

The act provided:

... there shall be raised, levied, collected and paid, unto and for the use of his Majesty ..., upon all rum or spirits of the produce or manufacture of any of the colonies or plantations in America, not in the possession or under the dominion of his Majesty ..., which at any time or times within or during the continuance of this act, shall be imported or brought into any of the colonies or plantations in America, which now are or hereafter may be in the possession or under the dominion of his Majesty ..., the sum of nine pence, money of Great Britain, ... for every gallon thereof, and after that rate for any greater or lesser quantity: and upon all molasses or syrups of such foreign produce or manufacture as aforesaid, which shall be imported or brought into any of the said colonies or plantations ..., the sum of six pence of like money for every gallon thereof ... ; and upon all sugars and paneles of such foreign growth, produce or manufacture as aforesaid, which shall be imported into any of the said colonies or plantations ... a duty after the rate of five shillings of like money, for every hundred weight Avoirdupois. ...

— "Molasses Act Text - December 25, 1733". Revolutionary War and Beyond.

The historian Theodore Draper described British intent on the tax as it would affect the American colonies:

Bladen [Col. Main Bladen who was a longtime member of the British Board of Trade] had conceived of the strategy of inflicting a prohibitive duty on imports from the French West Indies instead of simply disabling them. When he was confronted with the argument that the proposed bill would result in the ruin of the North American colonies, he replied, "that the duties proposed would not prove an absolute prohibition, but he owned that he meant them as something that should come very near it, for in the way the northern colonies are, they raise the French Islands at the expense of ours, and raise themselves also [to]o high, even to an independency."

— Draper 1996, p. 100: The quote provided by Draper came from Stock 1937, p. 182

A large colonial molasses trade had grown between the New England and Middle colonies and the French, Dutch, and Spanish West Indian possessions. Molasses from the British West Indies, which was used in New England for making rum, was priced much higher than its competitors and they also had no need for the large quantities of lumber, fish, and other items offered by the colonies in exchange. The British West Indies in the first part of the 18th century were the most important trading partner for Great Britain so Parliament was attentive to their requests. However, rather than acceding to the demands to prohibit the colonies from trading with the non-British islands, Parliament passed the prohibitively high tax on the colonies for the import of molasses from those islands. Historian John C. Miller noted that the tax:

... threatened New England with ruin, struck a blow at the economic foundations of the Middle colonies, and at the same time opened the way for the British West Indians—whom the continental colonists regarded as their worst enemies—to wax rich at the expense of their fellow subjects on the mainland.

— Miller 1943, p. 95

Largely opposed by colonists, the tax was rarely paid, and smuggling to avoid it was prominent. If actually collected, the tax would have effectively closed that source to New England and destroyed much of the rum industry. However, smuggling, bribery, or intimidation of customs officials effectively nullified the law. Miller wrote:

Against the Molasses Act, Americans had only their smugglers to depend upon—but these redoubtable gentry proved more than a match for the British. After a brief effort to enforce the act in Massachusetts in the 1740s, the English government tacitly accepted defeat and foreign molasses was smuggled into the Northern colonies in an ever-increasing quantity. Thus the New England merchants survived—but only by nullifying an act of Parliament.

— Miller 1943, p. 99

The growing corruption of local officials and disrespect for British Law caused by the act and others like it such as the Stamp Act or Townshend Acts eventually led to the American Revolution in 1776. This Act was replaced by the Sugar Act 1764. The act halved the tax rate but was accompanied by British intent of actually collecting the tax this time.

== Legacy ==
The act was continued until the end of the next session of parliament act after 7 years from the expiration of the act by section 2 of the Continuance of Laws Act 1737 (11 Geo. 2. c. 18).

The act was continued until the end of the next session of parliament act after 7 years from the expiration of the act by section 1 of the Growth of Coffee Act 1745 (19 Geo. 2. c. 23).

The act was continued until the end of the next session of parliament after 24 June 1758 by section 5 of the Continuance of Laws, etc. Act 1753 (26 Geo. 2. c. 32).

The act was continued until the end of the next session of parliament after 29 September 1761 by section 3 of the Passage from Charing Cross Act 1757 (31 Geo. 2. c. 36).

The act was continued until 30 September 1764 by section 4 of the Sugar Act 1763 (4 Geo. 3. c. 15). Section 5 of the Sugar Act 1763 (4 Geo. 3. c. 15) provided that after 30 September 1764, the act would become perpetual.

The whole act was repealed by section 1 of, and the schedule to, the Statute Law Revision Act 1867 (30 & 31 Vict. c. 59).

== Bibliography ==
- Draper, Theodore (1996). A Struggle for Power: The American Revolution. Times Books. ISBN 0-8129-2575-0.
- Middlekauff, Robert (2005). The Glorious Cause: The American Revolution, 1763–1789. ISBN 0-19-516247-1.
- Miller, John C. (1943). Origins of the American Revolution. Boston: Little, Brown and company. OL 6453380M.
- Stock, Leo Francis (1937). Proceedings and Debates of the British Parliaments respecting North America. Vol. 4.
