= Sugar Act =

British legislation imposing import duties on American colonies

Sugar Act 1763
- Act of Parliament
- Parliament of Great Britain
- Long title: An act for granting certain duties in the British colonies and plantations in Africa, for continuing, amending, and making perpetual, an act in the sixth year of the reign of his late majesty King George the Second, (initituled, An act for the better securing and encouraging the trade of his Majesty's sugar colonies in America) for applying the produce of such duties, and of the duties to arise by virtue of the said act, towards defraying and disallowing several drawbacks on exports from this kingdom, and more effectually preventing the clandestine conveyance of goods to and from the said colonies and plantation, and improving and securing the trade between the same and Great Britain.
- Citation: 4 Geo. 3. c. 15
- Introduced by: The Rt. Hon. George Grenville, MP; Prime Minister, Chancellor of the Exchequer & Leader of the House of Commons (Commons)
- Territorial extent: Great Britain; British America and the British West Indies

Dates
- Royal assent: 5 April 1764
- Commencement: 29 September 1764 (Note: Section 1.)
- Repealed: 15 July 1867
Other legislation
Amends	Trade of Sugar Colonies Act 1732
Amended by	Revenue Act 1766
Repealed by	Statute Law Revision Act 1867
Relates to	Molasses Act; Trade Act 1774

Status: Repealed

Text of statute as originally enacted

The Sugar Act 1764 or Sugar Act 1763 (4 Geo. 3. c. 15), also known as the American Revenue Act 1764 or the American Duties Act, was an act of the Parliament of Great Britain. The act was a revenue-raising act passed on 5 April 1764. The preamble to the act stated: "it is expedient that new provisions and regulations should be established for improving the revenue of this Kingdom ... and ... it is just and necessary that a revenue should be raised ... for defraying the expenses of defending, protecting, and securing the same." The earlier Molasses Act 1733 (6 Geo. 2. c. 13), which had imposed a tax of six pence per gallon of molasses, had never been effectively collected due to colonial evasion. By reducing the rate by half and increasing measures to enforce the tax, Parliament hoped that the tax would actually be collected. These incidents increased the colonists' concerns about the intent of the British Parliament and helped the growing movement that became the American Revolution.

== Background ==
The Molasses Act 1733 (6 Geo. 2. c. 13) was passed by Parliament largely at the insistence of large plantation owners in the British West Indies. Molasses from French, Dutch, and Spanish West Indian possessions was inexpensive. Producers of sugar from the British West Indies priced sugar much higher than their competitors, and they had no need for the large quantities of lumber, fish, and other items offered by the colonies in exchange. Sometimes colonists would pay Molasses Act taxes because they were rather low depending on where they resided and how much money they had. In the first part of the 18th century, the British West Indies were Great Britain's most important trading partner, so Parliament was attentive to their requests. However, rather than acceding to their demands to prohibit the colonies from trading with the non-British islands, Parliament passed a prohibitively high tax on the colonies on molasses imported from those islands. If actually collected, the tax would have effectively closed that source to New England and destroyed much of the rum industry. Instead, smuggling, bribery or intimidation of customs officials effectively nullified the law.

During the Seven Years' War, known in Colonial America as the French and Indian War, the British government substantially increased the national debt to pay for the war. In February 1763, as the war ended, the ministry headed by John Stuart, the Earl of Bute, decided to maintain a standing army of ten thousand British regular troops in the colonies. Shortly thereafter, George Grenville replaced Bute. Grenville supported his predecessor's policy, even more so after the outbreak of Pontiac's War in May 1763. Grenville faced the problem of not only paying for these troops but servicing the national debt. The debt grew from £75,000,000 before the war to £122,600,000 in January 1763, and almost £130,000,000 by the beginning of 1764.

George Grenville did not expect the colonies to contribute to the interest or the retirement of the debt, but he did expect the Americans to pay a portion of the expenses for colonial defense. Estimating the expenses of maintaining an army in the Continental colonies and the West Indies to be approximately £200,000 annually, Grenville devised a revenue-raising program that would raise an estimated £79,000 per year.

== Passage ==
The Molasses Act 1733 (6 Geo. 2. c. 13) was set to expire in 1763. The Commissioners of Customs anticipated greater demand for both molasses and rum as a result of the end of the war and the acquisition of Canada. They believed that the increased demand would make a sharply reduced rate both affordable and collectible. When passed by Parliament, the new Sugar Act 1764 halved the previous tax on molasses. In addition to promising stricter enforcement, the language of the bill made it clear that the purpose of the legislation was not to simply regulate the trade (as the Molasses Act had attempted to do by effectively closing the legal trade to non-British suppliers) but to raise revenue.

The new act listed specific goods, the most important being lumber, which could only be exported to Britain. Ship captains were required to maintain detailed manifests of their cargo and the papers were subject to verification before anything could be unloaded from the ships. Customs officials were empowered to have all violations tried in vice admiralty courts rather than by jury trials in local colonial courts, where the juries generally looked favourably on smuggling as a profession.

American historian Fred Anderson wrote that the purpose of the Act was "to resolve the problems of finance and control that plagued the postwar empire". To do this "three kinds of measures" were implemented – "those intended to make customs enforcement more effective, those that placed new duties on items widely consumed in America, and those that adjusted old rates in such a way as to maximize revenues."

== Effect on the American colonies ==
The act was passed by Parliament on 5 April 1764, and it arrived in the colonies at a time of economic depression. A good part of the reason was that a significant portion of the colonial economy during the Seven Years' War was involved with supplying food and supplies to the British Army. Colonials, however, especially those affected directly as merchants and shippers, assumed that the highly visible new tax program was the major culprit. As protests against the Sugar Act developed, it was the economic impact rather than the constitutional issue of taxation without representation that was the main focus for the colonists.

New England ports especially suffered economic losses from the Sugar Act as the stricter enforcement made smuggling molasses more dangerous and risky. Also they argued that the profit margin on rum was too small to support any tax on molasses. Forced to increase their prices, many colonists feared being priced out of the market. The British West Indies, on the other hand, now had unrestricted exports. With supply of molasses well exceeding demand, the islands prospered with their reduced expenses while New England ports saw revenue from their rum exports decrease. Additionally, the West Indies had been the primary colonial source for hard currency, or specie, and as the reserves of specie were depleted the soundness of colonial currency was threatened.

Two prime movers behind the protests against the Sugar Act were Samuel Adams and James Otis, both of Massachusetts. In May 1764 Samuel Adams drafted a report on the Sugar Act for the Massachusetts assembly, in which he denounced the act as an infringement of the rights of the colonists as British subjects:

For if our Trade may be taxed why not our Lands? Why not the Produce of our Lands & every thing we possess or make use of? This we apprehend annihilates our Charter Right to govern & tax ourselves – It strikes our British Privileges, which as we have never forfeited them, we hold in common with our Fellow Subjects who are Natives of Britain: If Taxes are laid upon us in any shape without our having a legal Representation where they are laid, are we not reduced from the Character of free Subjects to the miserable State of tributary Slaves?

In August 1764, fifty Boston merchants agreed to stop purchasing British luxury imports, and in both Boston and New York City there were movements to increase colonial manufacturing. There were sporadic outbreaks of violence, most notably in Rhode Island. Overall, however, there was not an immediate high level of protest over the Sugar Act in either New England or the rest of the colonies. That would begin in the later part of the next year when the Stamp Act 1765 (5 Geo. 3. c. 12) was passed.

The act was replaced with the Revenue Act 1766 (6 Geo. 3. c. 52), which reduced the tax to one penny per gallon on molasses imports, British or foreign. This occurred around the same time that the Stamp Act 1765 was repealed.

The whole act was repealed by section 1 of, and the schedule to, the Statute Law Revision Act 1867 (30 & 31 Vict. c. 59), which came into force on 15 July 1867.

== See also ==
- American Revolutionary War § Prelude to revolution for the context of the Sugar Act among other post-1763 revenue bills
- Soda tax for modern excises on sugar products and sugary soft drinks

== Bibliography ==
- Alexander, John K. Samuel Adams: America's Revolutionary Politician. (2002) ISBN 0-7425-2114-1
- Anderson, Fred, Crucible of War, 2000, ISBN 0-375-40642-5
- Draper, Theodore. A Struggle For Power:The American Revolution. (1996) ISBN 0-8129-2575-0
- Middlekauff, Robert. The Glorious Cause: The American Revolution, 1763-1789. (2005) ISBN 978 0-19-516247-9
- Miller, John C. Origins of the American Revolution. (1943)
- Nash, Gary B. The Unknown American Revolution: The Unruly Birth of Democracy and the Struggle to Create America. (2005) ISBN 0-670-03420-7
- "The Sugar Act".
