= Maryland Declaration of Rights =

The Maryland Declaration of Rights is series of statements establishing certain rights for people in Maryland. The Declaration of Rights opens the Maryland Constitution and has appeared in some form in all Maryland Constitutions since the first version in 1776. The Declaration began with 42 distinct articles and now, after amendments, contains 47. These include the guarantee of free speech, protection for people involved in legal cases, a prohibition on monopolies, and, by 1972 amendment, equal rights for the sexes under the law.

== Origins ==
The Maryland Declaration of Right was created at the 1776 Assembly of Freemen in Annapolis. On August 1, 1776, freemen with property in Maryland elected 76 delegates. They met from August 14 to November 11 and during that time drafted and approved the new Maryland's first constitution—of which the Declaration of Rights is the lead statement. There are no known records of the proceedings of this convention.

The original Declaration contains 42 articles.

The first version of the Declaration of Rights contrasts the new government of Maryland with the tyrannical British Monarchy.

The 1776 Declaration declared Legislative, Executive, and Judicial branches "forever separate and distinct"—establishing a separation of powers doctrine far more explicit than the one which came later in the Federal Constitution.

The Maryland Declaration of Rights bears some similarities to the Virginia Declaration of Rights, created as an independent document in May–June 1776, and the Pennsylvania Declaration of Rights, ratified as part of Pennsylvania's constitution in September 1776. Some parts of the Declaration resemble the Magna Carta.

== Transformation ==
The adoption of a new constitution in 1851 was motivated largely by a power imbalance between Maryland's two shores, as well as the related issue of slavery. At this point, the preamble of the Declaration changed from a condemnation of the British monarchy to a shorter introductory clause.

When the General Assembly held a constitutional convention in 1864, the state of Maryland was occupied by the federal military. The Union army had run the election of 1863 and heavily pushed the "Unconditional Union" party, which favored an end to legal slavery. The Maryland Constitution of 1864 reflects this pressing agenda.

Political fortunes reversed after the war, as the opposition once again had free rein. The Democrats won large electoral victories and assembled another constitutional convention in 1867. The 1867 convention deleted summarily a statement added in 1864, "That we hold it to be self-evident, that all men are created equally free; that they are endowed by their Creator with certain inalienable rights, among which are life, liberty, the enjoyment of the proceeds of their own labor, and the pursuit of happiness."

In 1971–1972, Maryland deleted the reference to "white men" as the only voters, legal suffrage having already been guaranteed for black men and women of any color designation by, respectively, the Fifteenth and Nineteenth Amendments to the federal constitution.

Voters in 1972 approved Article 46, an "Equal Rights Article", which guaranteed, "Equality of rights under the law shall not be abridged or denied because of sex."

Voters in 1994 approved Article 47, a "Crime Victims' Rights Article" that guaranteed rights to victims of crime.

Voters in 2024 approved Article 48 which established a right to reproductive freedom.

== Ennumerated rights ==
The Declaration establishes a government for Maryland based on popular sovereignty. Article 1 states that "all Government of Rights originates from the People, is founded in compact only, and instituted solely for the good of the whole." Article 6 states that government officials are:

Trustees of the Public, and, as such, accountable for their conduct: Wherefore, whenever the ends of Government are perverted, and public liberty manifestly endangered, and all other means of redress are ineffectual, the People may, and of right ought, to reform the old, or establish a new Government; the doctrine of non-resistance against arbitrary power and oppression is absurd, slavish and destructive of the good and happiness of mankind.

The Declaration has a provision for free speech: Article 40, which stipulates, "That the liberty of the press ought to be inviolably preserved; that every citizen of the State ought to be allowed to speak, write and publish his sentiments on all subjects, being responsible for the abuse of that privilege."

The Declaration of Rights has been construed in some cases as protecting individual rights where the federal Bill of Rights may not. In Choi v. State (1989), the Maryland Court of Appeals held that Article 22 of the Declaration of Rights—"That no man ought to be compelled to give evidence against himself in a criminal case"—extends further than the analogous Fifth Amendment to the United States Constitution because it provides an unconditional right that cannot be irrevocably waived for the duration of a trial.

== Bibliography ==
- Friedman, Dan. "The History, Development, and Interpretation of the Maryland Declaration of Rights". Temple Law Review 71(3), 1998.
- Friedman, Dan. "Magnificent Failure Revisited: Modern Maryland Constitutional Law from 1967 to 1998." Maryland Law Review 58(2), 1999.
- Reynolds, William L. "The Continued Importance of the Maryland Declaration of Rights." The Sense of the People: Papers from a Conference on the Maryland Constitution, 7 October 1989.
- Smith, Herbert C., and John T. Willis. Maryland Politics and Government: Democratic Dominance. University of Nebraska Press, 2012. ISBN 9780803238435
