= 1776 in Maryland =

- Decades: 1750s; 1760s; 1770s; 1780s; 1790s
- See also: History of Maryland; Historical outline of Maryland; List of years in Maryland; 1776 in the United States

The following is a list of events of the year 1776 in Maryland.

== Events ==
- January 28 – The Annapolis Convention is dissolved.
- The Maryland Constitution of 1776 is adopted.
- The Supreme Court of Maryland is established.

== See also ==
- 1776 in the United States
