= List of delegates to the Maryland Constitutional Convention (1776) =

The final session of the revolutionary Annapolis Convention in 1776 served as Maryland's first constitutional convention. They drafted a declaration of rights and a constitution for the state. This list of delegates reports the men who made up the convention, and the counties or towns they represented. Delegates were the following individuals.

Name	County represented
John Archer	Harford County
Richard Barnes	St. Mary's County
William Bayly Jr.	Frederick County (Note: Montgomery County was formed from part of Frederick County on October 1, 1776. Bayly, Williams, Willson, and Wootten represented Montgomery County after its formation.)
Samuel Beall	Frederick County
Smith Bishop	Worcester County
Jacob Bond	Harford County
Walter Bowie	Prince George's County
Benjamin Brevard	Cecil County
William Bruff	Queen Anne's County
Charles Carroll	Anne Arundel County
Charles Carroll of Carrollton	Annapolis
Peter Chaille	Worcester County
James Lloyd Chamberlaine	Talbot County
Jeremiah Townley Chase	Baltimore Town
Samuel Chase	Anne Arundel County
Thomas Cockey Deye	Baltimore County
John Dent	Charles County
Henry Dickinson	Caroline County
Joseph Earle	Kent County
Christopher Edelen	Frederick County
Pollard Edmondson	Talbot County
John Ennalls	Dorchester County
Joseph Ennalls	Dorchester County
Patrick Ewing	Cecil County
Ignatius Fenwick	St. Mary's County
Adam Fischer	Frederick County
William Fitzhugh	Calvert County
John Gibson	Talbot County
Joseph Gilpin	Cecil County
Robert Goldsborough	Dorchester County
Charles Grahame	Calvert County
Benjamin Hall	Prince George's County
John Hall	Anne Arundel County
Samuel Handy	Worcester County
Rezin Hammond	Anne Arundel County
Robert Townshend Hooe	Charles County
William Horsey	Somerset County
Samuel Hughes	Frederick County
Thomas Johnson	Caroline County
Jeremiah Jordan	St. Mary's County
James Kent	Queen Anne's County
Thomas Sim Lee	Prince George's County
John Love	Harford County
Henry Lowes	Somerset County
Benjamin Mackall IV	Calvert County
John MacKall	Calvert County
Luke Marbury	Prince George's County
Richard Mason	Caroline County
Josiah E. Mitchell	Worcester County
James Murray	Dorchester County
William Paca	Annapolis
John Parnham	Charles County
George Plater	St. Mary's County
Nathaniel Potter	Caroline County
John Purnell Robins	Worcester County
William Richardson	Caroline County
Charles Ridgely	Baltimore County
Thomas Ringgold V	Kent County
William Ringgold	Kent County
Henry Schnebeley	Frederick County
George Scott	Somerset County
Gustavus Scott	Somerset County
Thomas Semmens	Charles County
Peter Shepherd	Baltimore County
Upton Sheredine	Frederick County
David Shriver	Frederick County
David Smith	Cecil County
John Smith	Baltimore Town
Thomas Smyth	Kent County
John Stevenson	Baltimore County
Osborn Sprigg	Prince George's County
John Stull	Frederick County
Matthew Tilghman, Chairman	Talbot County
Elisha Williams	Frederick County
Jonathan Willson	Frederick County
Henry Wilson Jr.	Harford County
Thomas Sprigg Wootton	Frederick County
Brice T. B. Worthington	Anne Arundel County
Solomon Wright	Queen Anne's County
Turbutt Wright	Queen Anne's County
