= Benjamin Mackall IV =

American judge

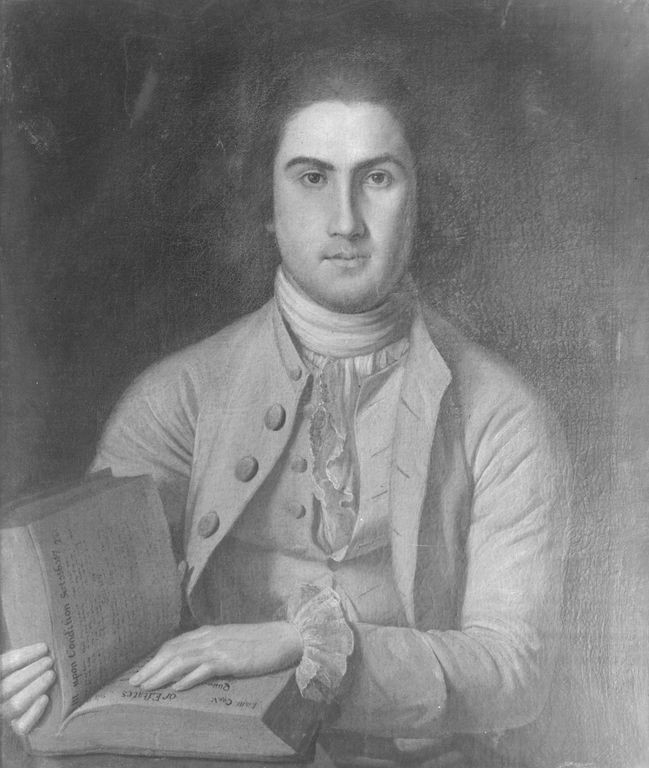
- portrait by Charles Willson Peale
- Born: 14 August 1745
- Died: 1807 (aged 61–62)

Benjamin Mackall IV (August 14, 1745 – 1807) was an American planter, lawyer, and jurist from Calvert County, Maryland. He served as a justice of the Maryland Court of Appeals from 1778 until 1806.

Benjamin was born into a large and prosperous Anglican family, that of Colonel John James Mackall (1717–1772) and Mary (Hance) Mackall. Besides tobacco, they raised five sons and eight daughters. Benjamin was the second son, so he studied law and was admitted to the bar in 1765. He practiced law in both Calvert and several nearby counties.

On November 20, 1769 Mackall married Rebecca Potts in Annapolis, Maryland. She was the sister of Richard Potts who would later serve with Benjamin on Maryland's Court of Appeals. Although not the eldest son, he did inherit a small farm in Calvert County from his father, which he expanded to 1,620 acres (7 km^{2}) by his death.

Mackall was first elected to the colonial House of delegates in 1768. He served there for a number of years. He was a member of all the sessions of the revolutionary house known as the Annapolis Convention, including the one that adopted the Maryland Constitution of 1776. At one of these he gained his name of Benjamin Mackall IV, since he was the fourth of that name to sign the Declaration of Rights of Freeman of Maryland in 1775. (The other three Benjamins were all cousins).

Mackall was a member of Calvert County's Committee of Safety in 1775 and 1776, and in 1776 followed in his father's path when he was chosen as the Colonel of the Calvert County militia. He later resigned this post when he was appointed to the court, believing that no one should hold more than one major office.

Benjamin was appointed in 1778 as one of the first set of justices to the Court of Appeals, which was the highest court in the state. When the number of justices was reduced to three in 1801 he was one of those who continued to serve. He finally resigned in 1806 due to declining health. He died at home in 1807 on his plantation known as God's Grace in Calvert County, and was buried in a family plot there.
