= History of Maryland =

The flag of Maryland

The recorded history of Maryland dates back to the beginning of European exploration, starting with the Venetian John Cabot, who explored the coast of North America for the Kingdom of England in 1498. After European settlements had been made to the south and north, the colonial Province of Maryland was granted by King Charles I to Sir George Calvert (1579–1632), his former Secretary of State in 1632, for settlement beginning in March 1634. It was notable for having been established with religious freedom for Roman Catholics, since Calvert had publicly converted to that faith. Like other colonies and settlements of the Chesapeake Bay region, its economy was soon based on tobacco as a commodity crop, highly prized among the English, cultivated primarily by African slave labor, although many young people came from Britain sent as indentured servants or criminal prisoners in the early years.

In 1781, during the American Revolutionary War (1775–1783), Maryland became the seventh state of the United States to ratify the Articles of Confederation and Perpetual Union. They were drawn up by a committee of the Second Continental Congress (1775–1781), which began shortly after the adoption of a Declaration of Independence in July 1776, to 1778. Later that year, these articles were recommended to the newly independent sovereign states via their legislatures for the required unanimous ratification. This long process was held up for three years by objections from smaller states led by Maryland until certain issues and principles over the western lands beyond the Appalachian Mountains to the Mississippi River. These objections were resolved with the larger states agreeing to cede their various western claims to the authority of the new Congress of the Confederation, representing all the states, to be held in common for the laying out and erection of new states out of the jointly held federal territories. Maryland then finally agreed to join the new American confederation by being one of the last of the former colonies ratifying the long proposed Articles in 1781, when they took effect. Later that same decade, Maryland became the seventh state to ratify the stronger government structure proposed in the new U.S. Constitution in 1788.

After the Revolutionary War, numerous Maryland planters freed their slaves as the economy changed. Baltimore grew to become one of the largest cities on the eastern seaboard, and a major economic force in the country. Although Maryland was still a slave state in 1860, by that time nearly half of the African American population was free, due mostly to manumissions after the American Revolution. Baltimore had the highest number of free people of color of any city in the United States. Maryland was among the four divided border states during the American Civil War (1861–1865), with most Marylanders fighting for the Union Army, along with a large number for the Confederacy. As a border state, it officially remained in the Union throughout the war.

== Precolonial history ==
It appears that the first humans in the area that would become Maryland arrived around the tenth millennium BC, about the time that the last ice age ended. They were hunter-gatherers organized into semi-nomadic groups. They adapted as the region's environment changed, developing the spear for hunting animals, like deer, which became more prevalent. By about 1500 BC, oysters had become an important food resource in the region. With the increased variety of food sources, permanent settlements started being built and social structures increased in complexity. By about 1000 BC, pottery was being produced. With the eventual rise of agriculture, these trends were confounded. While increasingly engaging in farming, hunting and fishing stayed important means of obtaining food. The bow and arrow were first used for hunting in the area around the year 800. They ate what they could kill, grow or catch in the rivers and other waterways.

Some of the historical Native tribes of Maryland

By 1000 AD, about 8,000 Native Americans were living in what is now the state, in 40 different villages. By the 17th century, the state was populated by a vairety of tribes. These were the Susquehannocks (west of the Delaware River), the Tuscarora, Tockwogh (on the Delmarva Peninsula between the Delaware and Indian Rivers), the Piscataway (surrounding the Potomac River from Washington D.C. south) and the Nanticoke (Delmarva Peninsula, south of the Indian River). John Smith labelled the Tuscarora as the Kuskarawock on an early map from 1606, but they shortly thereafter moved west to join the Meherrin and Nottoway in Virginia. Meanwhile, the Tockwogh may have moved to New York and/or been adopted by the Susquehannock. They were guessed to be the same as the Akhrakovaetonon and Trakwaerronnons, which seemed similar to Tockwogh. They were extinct as a tribe by the end of the 17th century, however.

The following Piscataway tribes lived on the eastern bank of the Potomac, from south to north: Yaocomicoes, Chopticans, Nanjemoys, Potopacs, Mattawomans, Piscataways, Patuxents, and Nacotchtanks. The area in which the Nacotchtank lived is now the District of Columbia. On the west bank of the Potomac river in what is now Virginia were the related tribes of the Patawomeck and the Doeg. Further west in the Appalachian Mountains, the Shawnee lived near Oldtown at a site abandoned around 1731. On the Eastern Shore of the Chesapeake, from south to north, there were the Nanticoke tribes: Annemessex, Assateagues, Wicomicoes, Nanticokes, Chicacone, and, on the north bank of the Choptank River, the Choptanks. The Tockwogh tribe lived near the headwaters of the Chesapeake near what is now Delaware. They were driven further north by enemies and eventually broke apart, with some staying in the region, others merging with the Nanticoke and others, known as the Conoy, migrated west into West Virginia. Some appeared around the end of the 18th century at Fort Detroit in Michigan.

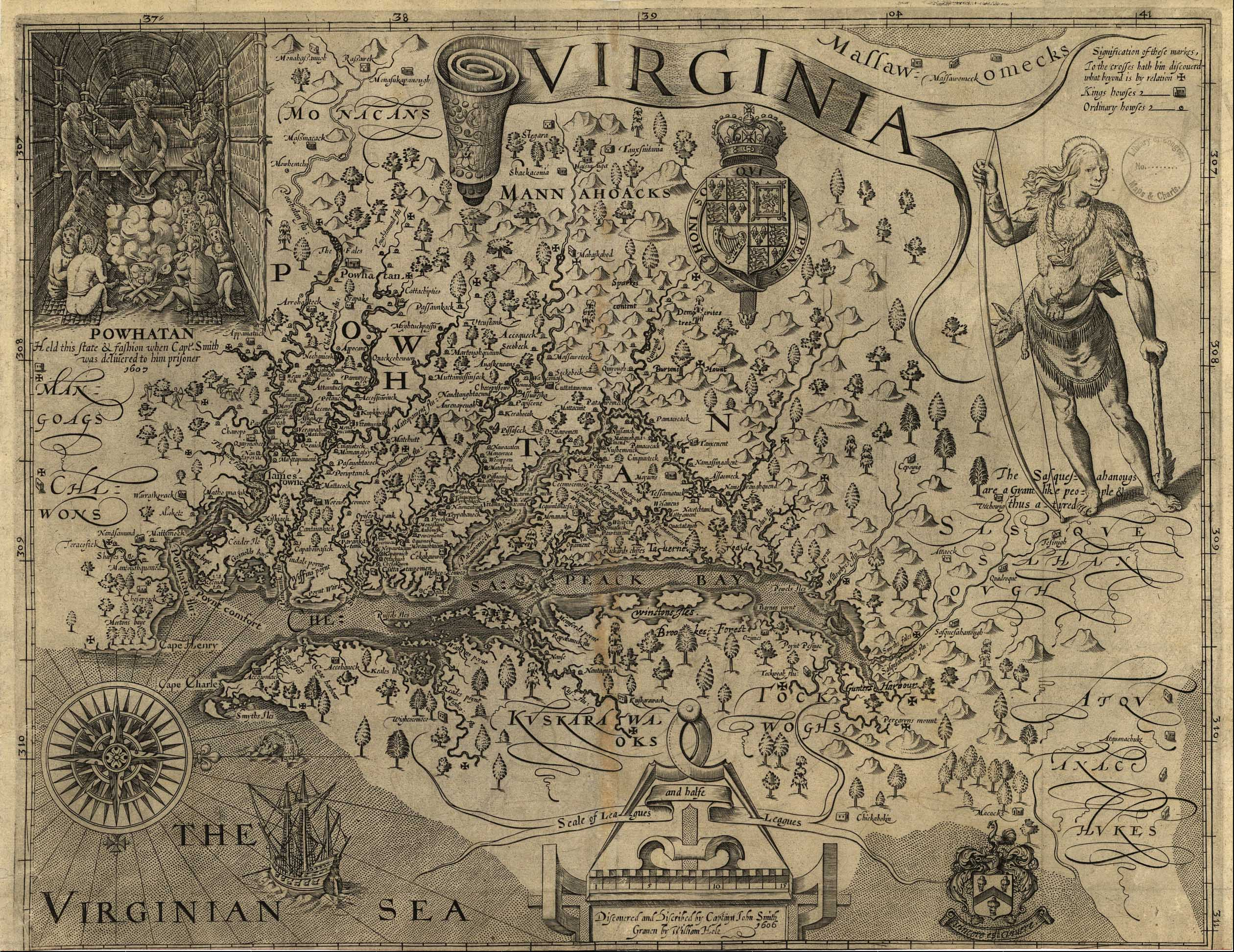
John Smith's map of the Chesapeake area

When Europeans began to settle in Maryland in the early 17th century, the more powerful tribes included the Nanticoke on the Eastern Shore, and the Susquehannock. Early exposure to new European diseases brought widespread fatalities to the Native Americans, as they had less immunity to them. Furthermore, the Susquehannock, already incorrectly considered savages and cannibals by the first Spanish explorers, made massive moves to control local trade with the first Swedish, Dutch and English settlers of the Chesapeake Bay region. As the century wore on, the Susquehannock would be caught up in the Beaver Wars, a war with the neighboring Lenape, a war with the Dutch, a war with the English, and a series of wars with the colonial government of Maryland. Due to colonial land claims, the exact territory of the Susquehannock was originally limited to the territory immediately surrounding the Susquehanna River, however, archaeology has discovered settlements of theirs dating to the 14th and 15th centuries around the Maryland-West Virginia border, and beyond. It could generally be assumed that most of Maryland's southern border is based on the borders of their own land. All of these wars, coupled with disease, destroyed the tribe and the last of their people were offered refuge from the Haudenosaunee Confederacy to the north shortly thereafter.

The closest living language to Susquehannock is the languages of the Mohawk and Tuscarora, who once lived immediately north and south of them. The English and Dutch came to call them the Minqua, from Lenape, which breaks into min-kwe and translates to "as a woman." As to when they arrived, some early records detailing their oral history seem to point to the fact that their ancestors conquered Ohio centuries before, but were pushed back east again by local rivals. They also conquered and absorbed other unknown groups in the process, which probably explains how languages like Tuscarora came to be so completely divergent from other Iroquoian languages. It also appears possible that the word "Iroquois" actually derived from their language.

The Nanticoke seem to have been largely confined to Indian Towns, but were later relocated to New York in 1778. Afterwards, they dissolved, with groups joining the Haudenosaunee and Lenape.

Also, as Susquehannocks began to abandon much of their westernmost territory due to their own hardships, a group of Powhatan split off, becoming known as the Shawnee and migrated into the western regions of Maryland and Pennsylvania briefly before moving on. At the time, they were relatively small, but they eventually made the Ohio River, migrating all the way into Ohio and merging with other nations there to become the powerful military force that they were known to be during the 18th and 19th centuries.

== Early European exploration ==
In 1498 the first European explorers sailed along the Eastern Shore, off present-day Worcester County. In 1524 Giovanni da Verrazzano, sailing under the French flag, passed the mouth of Chesapeake Bay. In 1608 John Smith entered the bay and explored it extensively. His maps have been preserved to today. Although technically crude, they are surprisingly accurate given the technology of those times (the maps are ornate but crude by modern technical standards).

The region was depicted in an earlier map by Estêvão Gomes and Diego Gutiérrez, made in 1562, in the context of the Spanish Ajacán Mission of the sixteenth century.

== Colonial Maryland ==
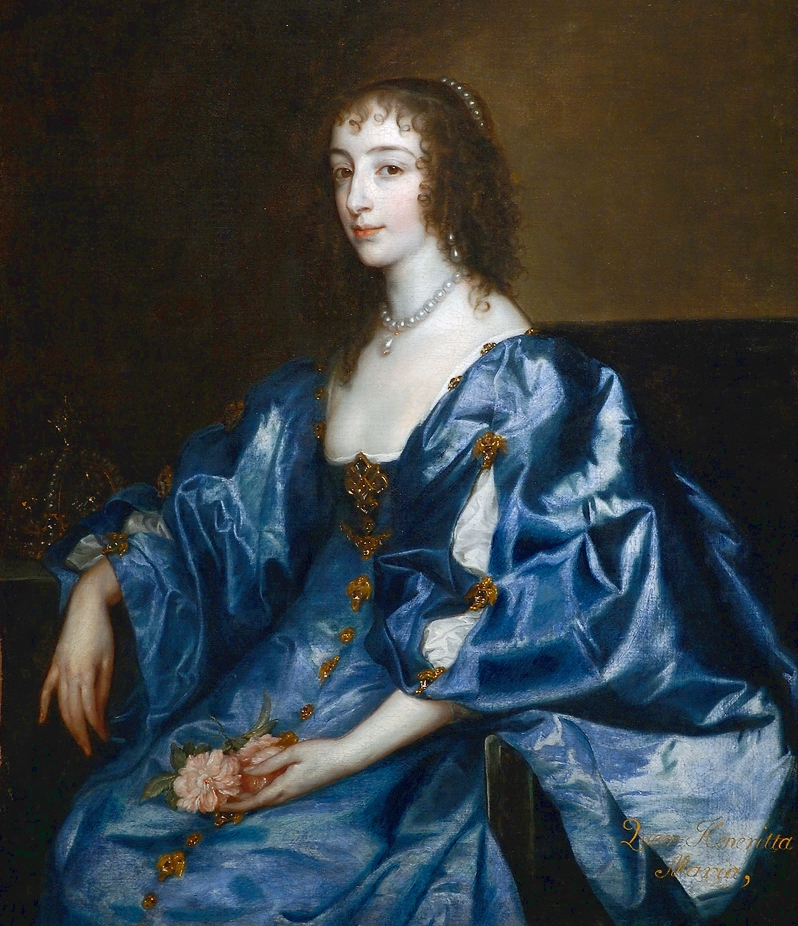
Maryland is named for Queen Henrietta Maria, who was the wife of King Charles I of England.

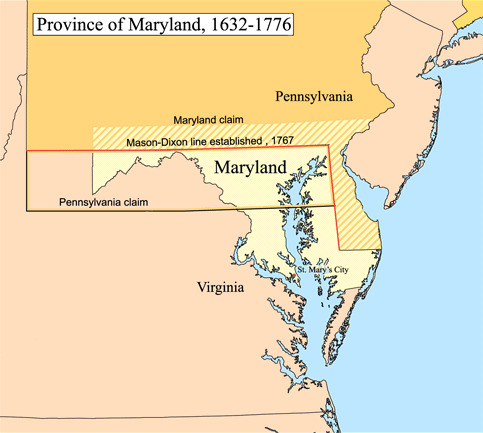
Map of the Maryland colony

=== Establishment ===
George Calvert, 1st Baron Baltimore, applied to Charles I for a royal charter for what was to become the Province of Maryland. After Calvert died in April 1632, the charter for "Maryland Colony" (in Latin Terra Mariae) was granted to his son, Cecilius Calvert, 2nd Baron Baltimore, on June 20, 1632. Some historians viewed this as compensation for his father having been stripped of his title of Secretary of State in 1625 after announcing his Roman Catholicism.

Officially the colony is said to be named in honor of Queen Henrietta Maria, the wife of King Charles I. Some Catholic scholars believe that George Calvert named the province after Mary, the mother of Jesus. The name in the charter was phrased Terra Mariae, anglice, Maryland. The English name was preferred due to the undesired associations of Mariae with the Spanish Jesuit Juan de Mariana, linked to the Inquisition.

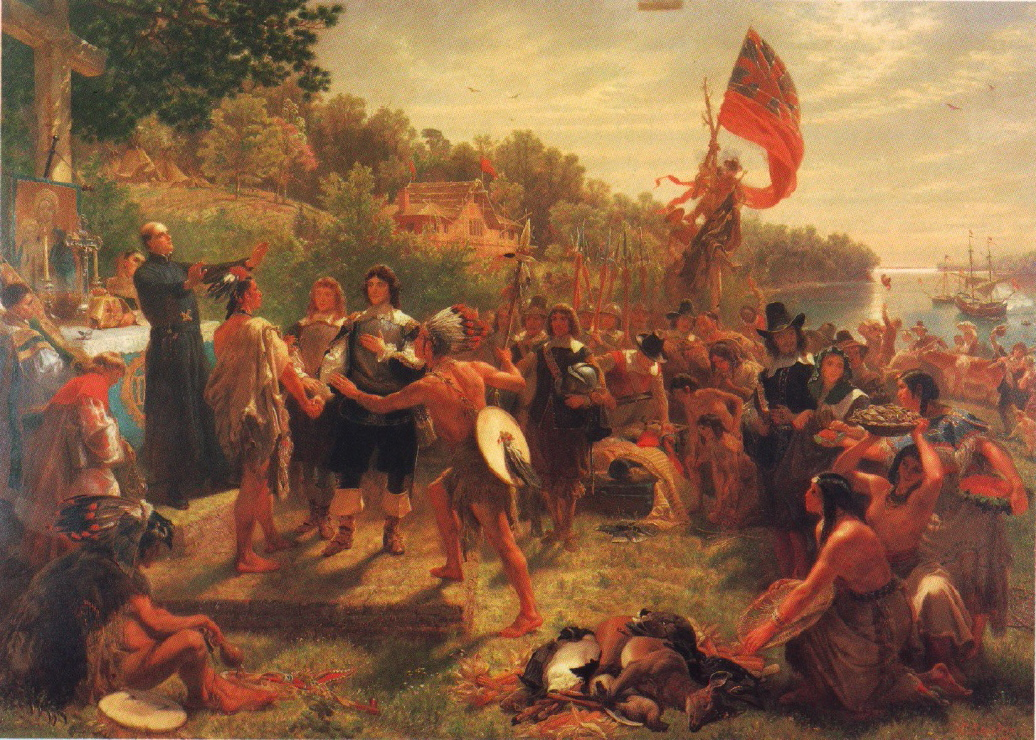
The Founding of Maryland (1634) depicts colonists meeting the people of the Yaocomico branch of the Piscataway Indian Nation in St. Mary's City, Maryland, the site of Maryland's first colonial settlement. The painting represents traditionally-held elements of Maryland's centuries-old founding narrative, though some details—such as the clothing worn by natives—are not necessarily accurate. The presentation is a mythic depiction and is an assembly of traditional tales about Maryland's founding. Father Andrew White, a Jesuit missionary, is believed to be on the left; other elements may be as follows: in front of him Leonard Calvert, the colonists' leader and the son of the first Lord Baltimore, is clasping hands with the paramount chief of the Yaocomico. Gifts of food offered to the new colonists are in the right foreground. In the right background are moored the sailing ships the Ark and the Dove, the vessels that brought the first colonists to Maryland.

As did other colonies, Maryland used the headright system to encourage people to bring in new settlers. Led by Leonard Calvert, Cecil Calvert's younger brother, the first settlers departed from Cowes, on the Isle of Wight, on November 22, 1633, aboard two small ships, the Ark and the Dove. Their landing on March 25, 1634, at St. Clement's Island in southern Maryland is commemorated by the state each year on that date as Maryland Day. This was the site of the first celebration of the Catholic Mass in the Colonies, with Father Andrew White leading the service. The first group of colonists consisted of 17 gentlemen and their wives, and about two hundred others, mostly indentured servants.

After purchasing land from the Yaocomico Indians and establishing the town of St. Mary's, Leonard, per his brother's instructions, attempted to govern the country under feudalistic precepts. Meeting resistance, in February 1635, he summoned a colonial assembly. In 1638, the Assembly forced him to govern according to the laws of England. The right to initiate legislation passed to the assembly.

In 1638 Calvert seized a trading post in Kent Island established by the Virginian William Claiborne. In 1644 Claiborne led an uprising of Maryland Protestants. Calvert was forced to flee to Virginia, but he returned at the head of an armed force in 1646 and reasserted proprietarial rule.

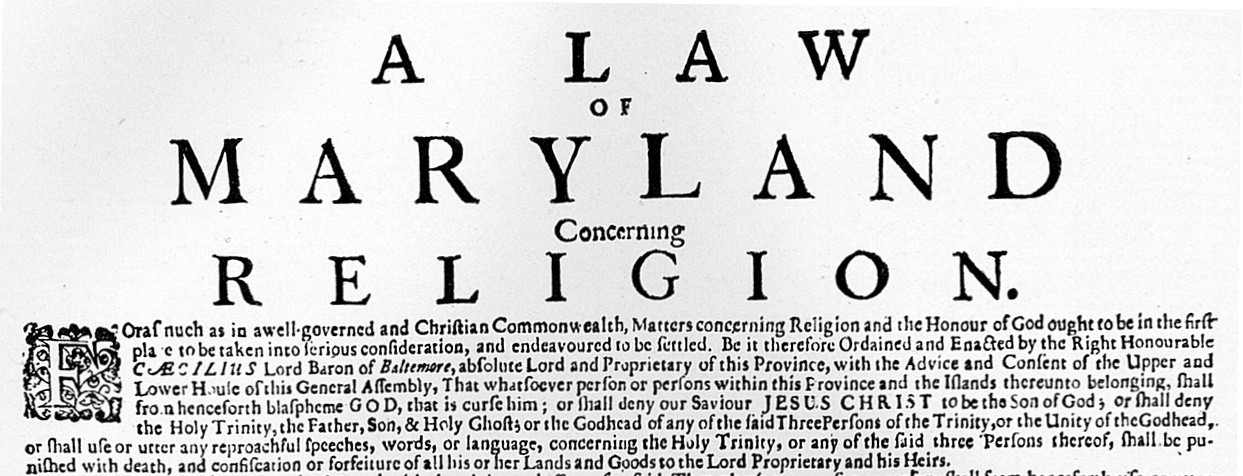
A large broadside of the Maryland Toleration Act

Maryland soon became one of the few predominantly Catholic regions among the English colonies in North America. Maryland was also one of the key destinations where the government sent tens of thousands of English convicts punished by sentences of transportation. Such punishment persisted until the Revolutionary War.

The Maryland Toleration Act, issued in 1649, was one of the first laws that explicitly defined tolerance of varieties of Christianity.

=== Protestant revolts ===
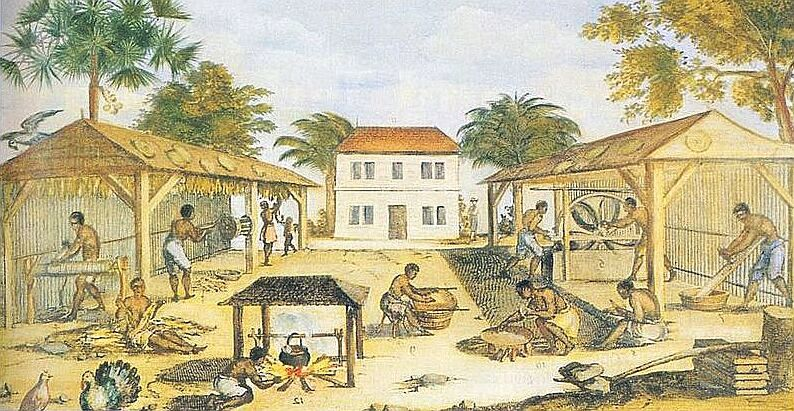
Tobacco was the main export crop in the colonial era; it involved a great deal of hand labor, usually done by enslaved Africans, as shown here in a 1670 painting from Virginia

St. Mary's City was the largest settlement in Maryland and the seat of colonial government until 1695. Because Anglicanism had become the official religion in Virginia, a band of Puritans in 1649 left for Maryland; they founded Providence (now called Annapolis). In 1650 the Puritans revolted against the proprietary government. They set up a new government prohibiting both Catholicism and Anglicanism. In March 1655, the 2nd Baron Baltimore sent an army under Governor William Stone to put down this revolt. Near Annapolis, his Roman Catholic army was decisively defeated by a Puritan army in the Battle of the Severn. The Puritan Revolt lasted until 1658, when the Calvert family regained control and re-enacted the Toleration Act.

In 1689, following the accession of a Protestant monarchy in England, rebels against the Catholic regime in Maryland overthrew the government and took power. Lord Baltimore was stripped of his right to govern the province, though not of his territorial rights. Maryland was designated as a royal province, administered by the crown via appointed governors until 1715. At that time, Benedict Calvert, 4th Baron Baltimore, having converted to Anglicanism, was restored to proprietorship.

The Protestant revolutionary government persecuted Maryland Catholics during its reign. Mobs burned down all the original Catholic churches of southern Maryland. The Anglican Church was made the established church of the colony. In 1695 the royal Governor, Francis Nicholson, moved the seat of government to Ann Arundell Town in Anne Arundel County and renamed it Annapolis in honor of the Princess Anne, who later became Queen Anne of Great Britain. Annapolis remains the capital of Maryland. St. Mary's City is now an archaeological site, with a small tourist center.

Just as the city plan for St. Mary's City reflected the ideals of the founders, the city plan of Annapolis reflected those in power at the turn of the 18th century. The plan of Annapolis extends from two circles at the center of the city – one including the State House and the other the established Anglican St. Anne's Church (now Episcopal). The plan reflected a stronger relationship between church and state, and a colonial government more closely aligned with Protestant churches. General British policy regarding immigration to all British America would be reflected broadly in the Plantation Act 1740.

=== Mason–Dixon Line ===
Based on an incorrect map, the original royal charter granted to Maryland the Potomac River and territory northward to the fortieth parallel. This was found to be a problem, as the northern boundary would have put Philadelphia, the major city in Pennsylvania, within Maryland. The Calvert family, which controlled Maryland, and the Penn family, which controlled Pennsylvania, decided in 1750 to engage two surveyors, Charles Mason and Jeremiah Dixon, to establish a boundary between the colonies.

They surveyed what became known as the Mason–Dixon line, which became the boundary between the two colonies. The crests of the Penn family and of the Calvert family were put at the Mason–Dixon line to mark it.

=== Horse racing and gentry values ===
In Chesapeake society (that is, colonial Virginia and Maryland), sports occupied a great deal of attention at every social level. Horse racing was sponsored by the wealthy gentry plantation owners, and attracted ordinary farmers as spectators and gamblers. Selected slaves often became skilled horse trainers. Horse racing was especially important for knitting the gentry together. The race was a major public event designed to demonstrate to the world the superior social status of the gentry through expensive breeding and training of horses, boasting and gambling, and especially winning the races themselves. Historian Timothy Breen explains that horseracing and high-stakes gambling were essential to maintaining the status of the gentry. When they publicly bet a large fraction of their wealth on their favorite horse, they expressed competitiveness, individualism, and materialism as the core elements of gentry values.

== The Revolutionary period ==
Maryland did not at first favor independence from Great Britain and gave instructions to that effect to its delegates to the Second Continental Congress. During this initial phase of the Revolutionary period, Maryland was governed by a series of conventions of the Assembly of Freemen. The first convention of the Assembly lasted four days, from June 22 to 25, 1774. All thirteen counties then existing were represented by a total of 92 members; Matthew Tilghman was elected chairman.

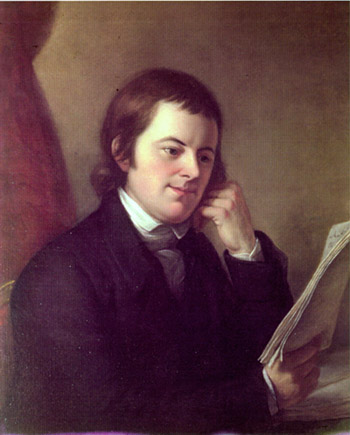
Thomas Johnson, Maryland's first elected governor under its 1776 Constitution

The eighth session decided that the continuation of an ad hoc government by the convention was not a good mechanism for all the concerns of the province. A more permanent and structured government was needed. So, on July 3, 1776, they resolved that a new convention be elected that would be responsible for drawing up their first state constitution, one that did not refer to parliament or the king, but would be a government "...of the people only." After they set dates and prepared notices to the counties they adjourned. On August 1, all freemen with property elected delegates for the last convention. The ninth and last convention was also known as the Constitutional Convention of 1776. They drafted a constitution, and when they adjourned on November 11, they would not meet again. The conventions were replaced by the new state government which the Maryland Constitution of 1776 had established. Thomas Johnson became the state's first elected governor.

On March 1, 1781, the Articles of Confederation and Perpetual Union was ratified and took effect with the confirmation signing of the Articles by two Maryland delegates in Philadelphia. The articles had initially been submitted to the states on November 17, 1777, but the ratification process dragged on for several years, stalled by an interstate quarrel over claims to uncolonized land in the west of the Appalachian Mountains to the Mississippi River. Maryland was the last hold-out; it refused to ratify until larger states like Virginia and New York agreed to rescind their claims to lands in what became the old Northwest Territory and the Southwest Territory. Chevalier de La Luzerne, French Minister to the United States, felt that the Articles would help strengthen the American government. In 1780 when Maryland requested France provide naval forces in the Chesapeake Bay for protection from the British (who were conducting raids in the lower part of the bay), he indicated that French Admiral Destouches would do what he could but La Luzerne also "sharply pressed" Maryland to ratify the Articles, thus suggesting the two issues were related. On February 2, 1781, the much-awaited decision was taken by the Maryland General Assembly in Annapolis. As the last piece of business during the afternoon Session, "among engrossed Bills" was "signed and sealed by Governor Thomas Sim Lee in the Senate Chamber, in the presence of the members of both Houses... an Act to empower the delegates of this state in Congress to subscribe and ratify the articles of confederation" and perpetual union among the states. The Senate then adjourned "to the first Monday in August next." The decision of Maryland to ratify the Articles was reported to the Continental Congress on February 12, 1781.

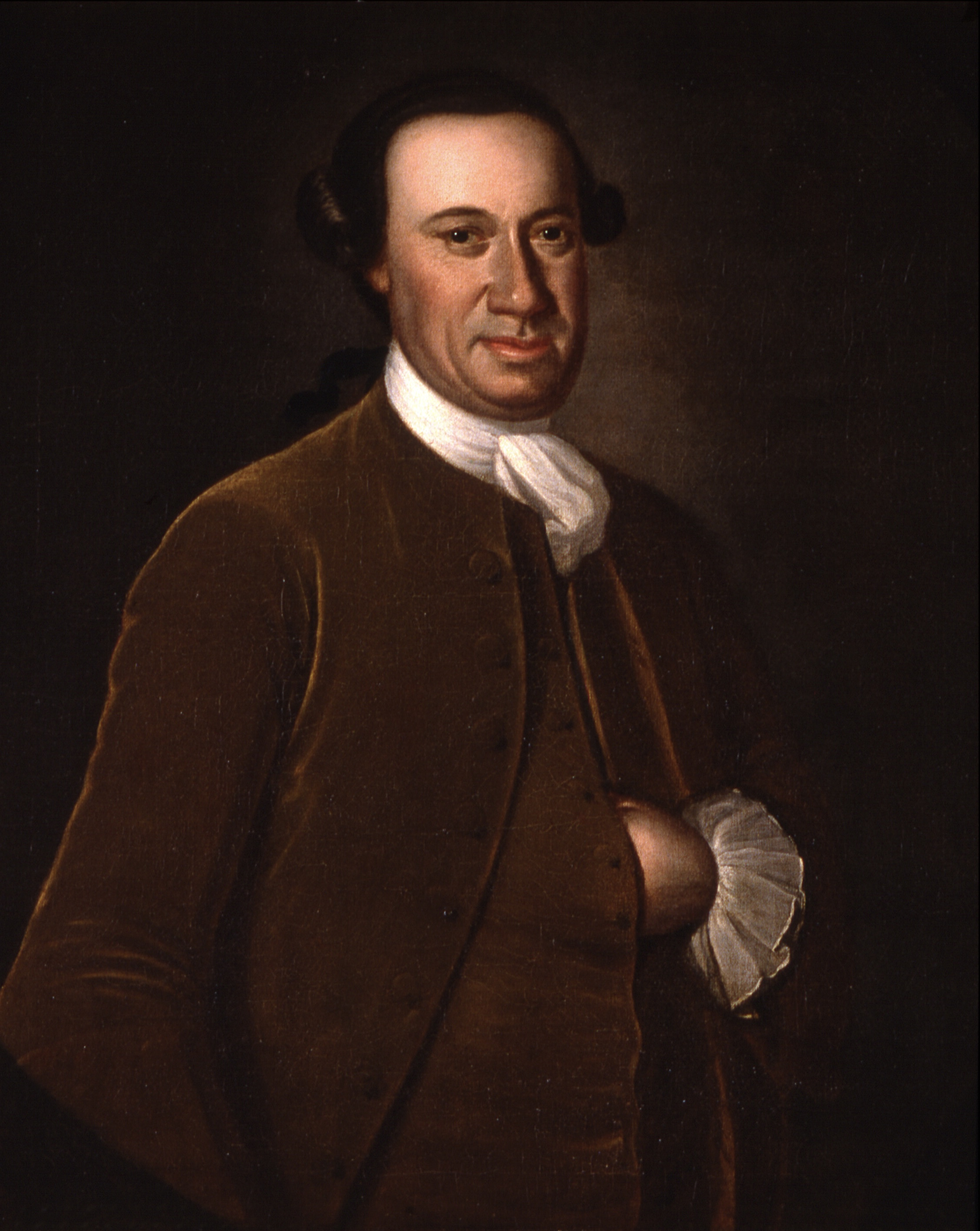
Marylander John Hanson (circa 1765 to 1770) was the first person to serve a full term as "President of the United States in Congress Assembled" under the Articles of Confederation and Perpetual Union, used 1781 to 1789.

No significant battles of the American Revolutionary War (1775–1783) occurred in Maryland. However, this did not prevent the state's soldiers from distinguishing themselves through their service. General George Washington was impressed with the Maryland regulars (the "Maryland Line") who fought in the Continental Army and, according to one tradition, this led him to bestow the name "Old Line State" on Maryland. Today, the Old Line State is one of Maryland's two official nicknames.

The Second Continental Congress met briefly in Baltimore from December 20, 1776, through March 4, 1777 at the old hotel, later renamed Congress Hall, at the southwest corner of West Market Street (now Baltimore Street) and Sharp Street/Liberty Street. Marylander John Hanson, served as President of the Continental Congress from 1781 to 1782. Hanson was the first person to serve a full term with the title of "President of the United States in Congress Assembled" under the Articles of Confederation and Perpetual Union.

Annapolis served as the temporary United States capital from November 26, 1783, to June 3, 1784, and the Confederation Congress met in the recently completed Maryland State House. Annapolis was a candidate to become the new nation's permanent capital before the site along the Potomac River was selected for the District of the Columbia. It was in the old Senate chamber that General George Washington famously resigned his commission as commander in chief of the Continental Army on December 23, 1783. It was also there that the Treaty of Paris of 1783, which ended the Revolutionary War, was ratified by Congress on January 14, 1784.

Major General William Smallwood, having served under General George Washington during the Revolutionary War, then Commander-in-Chief of the Continental Army, became the fourth American Governor of Maryland. In 1787, Governor William Smallwood called together and convened the state convention to decide whether to ratify the proposed U.S. Constitution in 1788. The majority of the votes at the convention were in favor of ratification, and Maryland became the seventh state to ratify the Constitution.

== Maryland, 1789–1849 ==
=== Economic development ===
The American Revolution stimulated the domestic market for wheat and iron ore, and flour milling increased in Baltimore. Iron ore transport greatly boosted the local economy. By 1800 Baltimore had become one of the major cities of the new republic. The British naval blockade during the War of 1812 hurt Baltimore's shipping, but also freed merchants and traders from British debts, which along with the capture of British merchant vessels furthered the city's economic growth.

==== Transportation initiatives ====
The city had a deepwater port. In the early 19th century, many business leaders in Maryland were looking inland, toward the western frontier, for economic growth potential. The challenge was to devise a reliable means to transport goods and people. The National Road and private turnpikes were being completed throughout the state, but additional routes and capacity were needed. Following the success of the Erie Canal (constructed 1817–25) and similar canals in the northeastern states, leaders in Maryland were also developing plans for canals. After several failed canal projects in the Washington, D.C. area, the Chesapeake and Ohio Canal (C&O) began construction there in 1828. The Baltimore business community viewed this project as a competitive threat. The geography of the Baltimore area made building a similar canal to the west impractical, but the idea of constructing railroads was beginning to gather support in the 1820s.

In 1827 city leaders obtained a charter from the Maryland General Assembly to build a railroad to the Ohio River. The Baltimore and Ohio Railroad (B&O) became the first chartered railroad in the United States, and opened its first section of track for regular operation in 1830, between Baltimore and Ellicott City. It became the first company to operate a locomotive built in America, with the Tom Thumb. The B&O built a branch line to Washington, D.C. in 1835. The main line west reached Cumberland in 1842, beating the C&O Canal there by eight years, and the railroad continued building westward. In 1852 it became the first rail line to reach the Ohio River from the eastern seaboard. Other railroads were built in and through Baltimore by mid-century, most significantly the Northern Central; the Philadelphia, Wilmington and Baltimore; and the Baltimore and Potomac. (All of these came under the control of the Pennsylvania Railroad.)

==== Industrial Revolution ====
Baltimore's seaport and good railroad connections fostered substantial growth during the Industrial Revolution of the 19th century. Many manufacturing businesses were established in Baltimore and the surrounding area after the Civil War.

Cumberland was Maryland's second largest city in the 19th century, with ample nearby supplies of coal, iron ore and timber. These resources, along with railroads, the National Road and the C&O Canal, fostered its growth. The city was a major manufacturing center, with industries in glass, breweries, fabrics and tinplate.

The Pennsylvania Steel Company founded a steel mill at Sparrow's Point in Baltimore in 1887. The mill was purchased by Bethlehem Steel in 1916, and it became the world's largest steel mill by the mid-20th century, employing tens of thousands of workers.

=== Educational institutions ===
In 1807, the College of Medicine of Maryland (later the University of Maryland Medical School) became the seventh medical school in the United States.

In 1840, by order of the Maryland state legislature, the non-religious St. Mary's Female Seminary was founded in St. Mary's City. This would later become St. Mary's College of Maryland, the state's public honors college. The United States Naval Academy was founded in Annapolis in 1845, and the Maryland Agricultural College was chartered in 1856, growing eventually into the University of Maryland.

=== Immigration and religion ===
Since the abolition of anti-Catholic laws in the early 1830s, the Catholic population rebounded considerably. The Maryland Catholic population began its resurgence with large waves of Irish Catholic immigration spurred by the Great Famine (1845–49) and then continued through the first half of the 20th century. Italian immigration and Polish immigrations also supplemented the Catholic population in Maryland. Baltimore was the third largest point of entry for European immigrants on the Eastern seaboard for much of this period. Although greatly increased, the Catholic population has never become a majority in the state.

=== War of 1812 ===
The "Battle Monument" at courthouse square was constructed in 1815–1822 to commemorate the Battle of Baltimore, Battle of North Point, and the naval bombardment of Fort McHenry by the British Royal Navy.

After the Revolution, the United States Congress approved construction of six heavy frigates to form a nucleus of the United States Navy. One of the first three, the USS Constellation, was constructed in Baltimore. Constellation became the first official U.S. Navy ship put to sea, deploying to the Caribbean Sea to participate in the Quasi-War against France.

During the War of 1812 the British raided cities along Chesapeake Bay up to Havre de Grace. Two notable battles occurred in the state. The first was the Battle of Bladensburg on August 24, 1814, just outside the national capital, Washington, D.C. The British army routed the American militiamen, who fled in confusion, and went on to capture Washington, D.C. They burned and looted major public buildings, forcing President James Madison to flee to Brookeville, Maryland.

The British next marched to Baltimore, where they hoped to strike a knockout blow against the demoralized Americans. Baltimore was not only a busy port but also suspected of harboring many of the privateers despoiling British ships. The city's defenses were under the command of Major General Samuel Smith, an officer and commander of the Maryland state militia and a United States senator. Baltimore had been well fortified with excellent supplies and some 15,000 troops. Maryland militia fought a determined delaying action at the Battle of North Point, during which a Maryland militia marksman shot and killed the British commander, Major General Robert Ross. The battle bought enough time for Baltimore's defenses to be strengthened.

After advancing to the edge of American defenses, the British halted their advance and withdrew. With the failure of the land advance, the sea battle became irrelevant and the British retreated. At Fort McHenry, some 1000 soldiers under the command of Major George Armistead awaited the British naval bombardment. Their defense was augmented by the sinking of a line of American merchant ships at the adjacent entrance to Baltimore Harbor to thwart passage of British ships. The attack began on the morning of September 13, as the British fleet of some nineteen ships began pounding the fort with rockets and mortar shells. After an initial exchange of fire, the British fleet withdrew just beyond the 1.5 miles (2.4 km) range of Fort McHenry's cannons. For the next 25 hours, they bombarded the outmanned Americans. On the morning of September 14, an oversized American flag, which had been raised before daybreak, flew over Fort McHenry. The British knew that victory had eluded them. The bombardment of the fort inspired Francis Scott Key of Frederick, Maryland to write "The Star-Spangled Banner" as witness to the assault. It later became the country's national anthem.

== American Civil War ==
=== Maryland's mixed sympathies ===
8th Massachusetts regiment repairing railroad bridges from Annapolis to Washington, which were destroyed with the support of Maryland political leaders, Confederate sympathizers

Maryland was a border state, straddling the North and South. As in Virginia and Delaware, some planters in Maryland had freed their slaves in the years after the Revolutionary War. By 1860 Maryland's free black population comprised 49.1% of the total of African Americans in the state.

After John Brown's raid in 1859 on Harper's Ferry, Virginia, some citizens in slaveholding areas began forming local militias for defense. Of the 1860 population of 687,000, about 60,000 Marylanders joined the Union and about 25,000 fought for the Confederacy. The political alignments of each group generally reflected their economic interests, with slaveholders and people involved in trade with the South most likely to favor the Confederate cause, and small farmers and merchants outside the major cities and in western Maryland allied with the Union. In the 1860 election, Lincoln received only one vote in Prince George's County, a center of large plantations.

=== Beginning of the war ===
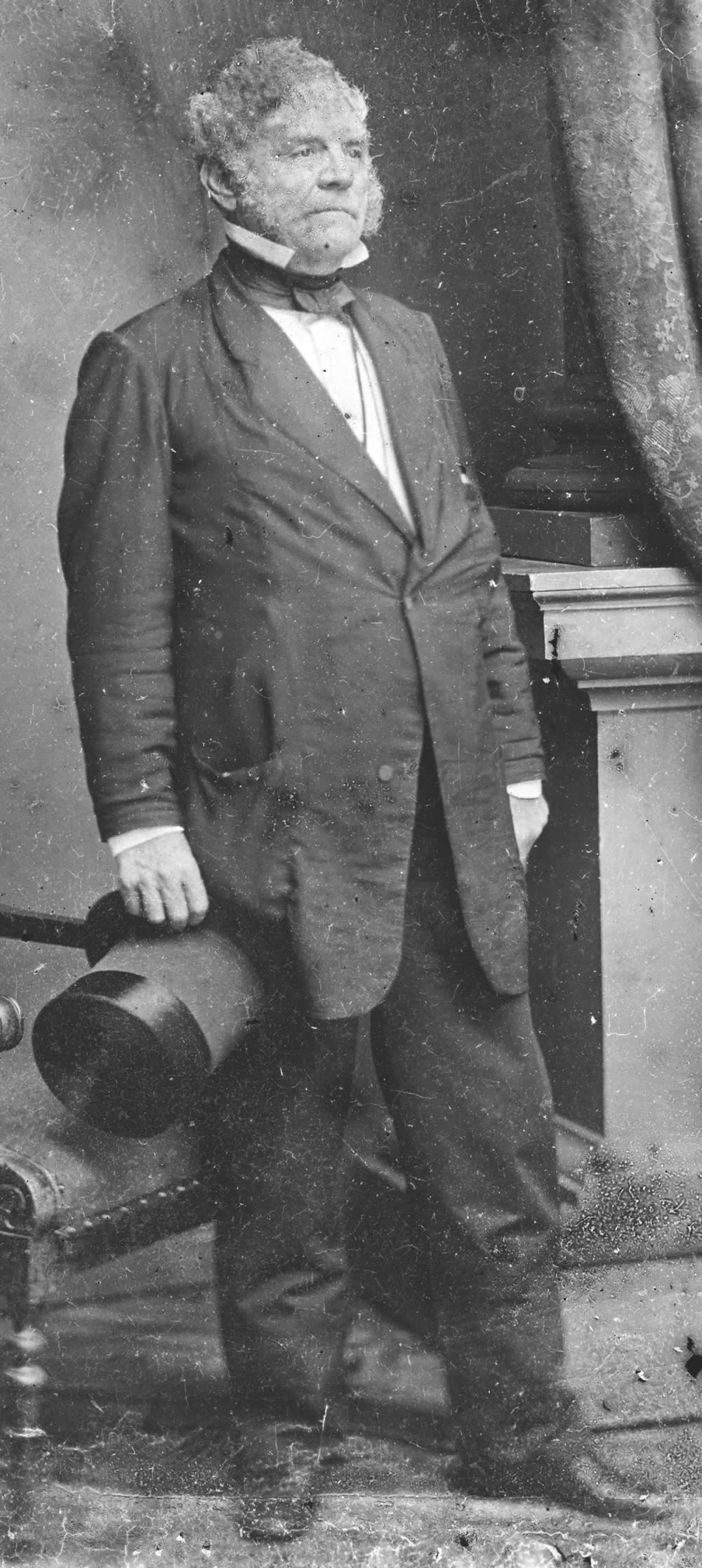
Governor Hicks

The first bloodshed of the war occurred in Baltimore when the 6th Massachusetts Militia battled an attacking mob while marching between railroad stations on April 19, 1861. After that, Baltimore Mayor George William Brown, Marshal George P. Kane, and former Governor Enoch Louis Lowe requested that Maryland Governor Thomas H. Hicks, a slave owner from the Eastern Shore, burn the railroad bridges and cut the telegraph lines leading to Baltimore to prevent further troops from entering the state. Hicks reportedly approved this proposal. These actions were addressed in the famous federal court case of Ex parte Merryman.

Maryland remained part of the Union during the Civil War. President Abraham Lincoln's strong hand suppressing violence and dissent in Maryland and the belated assistance of Governor Hicks played important roles. Hicks worked with federal officials to stop further violence.

Lincoln promised to avoid having Northern defenders march through Baltimore while en route to protect the acutely endangered federal capital. The majority of forces took a slow route by boat. Massachusetts militia general Benjamin F. Butler used the water route after learning about the troubles in Baltimore. He commandeered the P. W. & B. Railroad ferryboat Harriet Lane at the Susquehanna River crossing between Perryville in Cecil County to Havre de Grace in Harford County. Avoiding the riotous city, he steamed down the Chesapeake Bay to anchor at night off the Naval Academy at Severn Point in Annapolis.

He landed his troops of Massachusetts, New York and Rhode Island militia over the protests of Governor Thomas Holliday Hicks (1798–1865). He put some on the old Navy training ship frigate, USS Constitution ("Old Ironsides") and moved it off shore beyond reach of easy attack. Recruiting some railroad workers and boilermakers among his soldiers, Butler had them rescue a small yard locomotive in the trainyards and use it to take cars full of soldiers up the Annapolis Line of the B&O Railroad to Relay Junction near Ellicott City, where it joined the Main Line going west to Harpers Ferry, West Virginia or south to Washington. The Northern regiments used this route to reach the train station, now Washington Union Station near the U.S. Capitol). They camped that evening in the Rotunda, which was not yet completed. An additional unit was sent up Pennsylvania Avenue to reinforce the White House, where the president greeted them with relief.

Marylanders sympathetic to the South easily crossed the Potomac River to join and fight for the Confederacy. Exiles organized a "Maryland Line" in the Army of Northern Virginia which consisted of one infantry regiment, one infantry battalion, two cavalry battalions and four battalions of artillery. According to the best extant records, up to 25,000 Marylanders went south to fight for the Confederacy. About 60,000 Marylanders served in all branches of the Union military. Many of the Union troops were said to enlist on the promise of home garrison duty.

Maryland's naval contribution, the relatively new sloop-of-war USS Constellation was flagship of the US Africa Squadron from 1859 to 1861 and continued in this role during the war. In this period, she disrupted the African slave trade by interdicting three slave ships and releasing the imprisoned slaves. The last of the ships was captured at the outbreak of the Civil War: Constellation overpowered the slaver brig Triton in African coastal waters. Constellation spent much of the war as a deterrent to Confederate cruisers and commerce raiders in the Mediterranean Sea.

=== Occupation of Baltimore ===
A Union artillery garrison was placed on Federal Hill with express orders to destroy the city should Southern sympathizers overwhelm law and order there. Following the riot of 1861, Union troops under the command of General Benjamin F. Butler occupied the hill in the middle of the night. Butler and his troops erected a small fort, with cannon pointing towards the central business district. Their goal was to guarantee the allegiance of the city and the state of Maryland to the federal government under threat of force. This fort and the Union occupation persisted for the duration of the Civil War. A large flag, a few cannon, and a small Grand Army of the Republic monument remain to testify to this period of the hill's history.

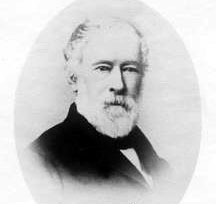
John Pendleton Kennedy, politician, author. Kennedy played a major role in bringing an end to slavery in Maryland. 1850 photograph.

Because Maryland remained in the Union, it fell outside the scope of the Emancipation Proclamation. A constitutional convention in 1864 culminated in the passage of a new state constitution on November 1 of that year. Article 24 of that document outlawed the practice of slavery. A campaign by state politician John Pendleton Kennedy and others ensured that abolishment of slavery would be in the new document, and the issue was hotly contested for nearly a year throughout the state. In the end the elimination of slavery was approved by a 1,000-vote margin. The right to vote was extended to non-white males in the Maryland Constitution of 1867, which is still in effect today.

=== The war on Maryland soil ===
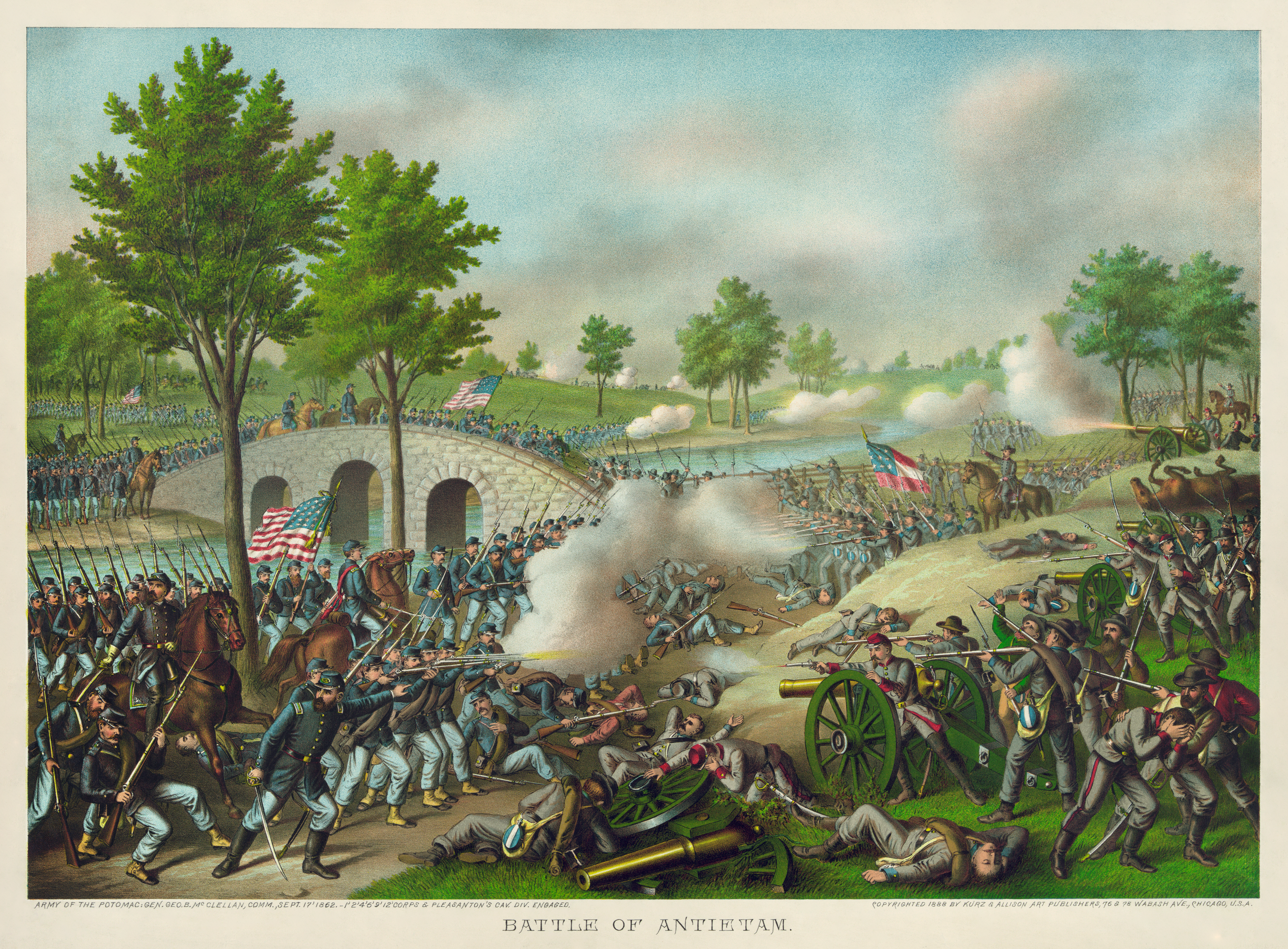
Battle of Antietam by Kurz and Allison

The largest and most significant battle fought in the state was the Battle of Antietam, fought on September 17, 1862, near Sharpsburg. The battle was the culmination of Robert E. Lee's Maryland Campaign, which aimed to secure new supplies, recruit fresh soldiers from among the considerable pockets of Confederate sympathies in Maryland, and to impact public opinion in the North. With those goals, Lee's Army of Northern Virginia, consisting of about 40,000 men, had entered Maryland following their recent victory at Second Bull Run.

While Major General George B. McClellan's 87,000-man Army of the Potomac was moving to intercept Lee, a Union soldier discovered a mislaid copy of the detailed battle plans of Lee's army. The order indicated that Lee had divided his army and dispersed portions geographically (to Harpers Ferry, West Virginia, and Hagerstown, Maryland), thus making each subject to isolation and defeat in detail if McClellan could move quickly enough. McClellan waited about 18 hours before deciding to take advantage of this intelligence and position his forces based on it, thus endangering a golden opportunity to defeat Lee decisively.

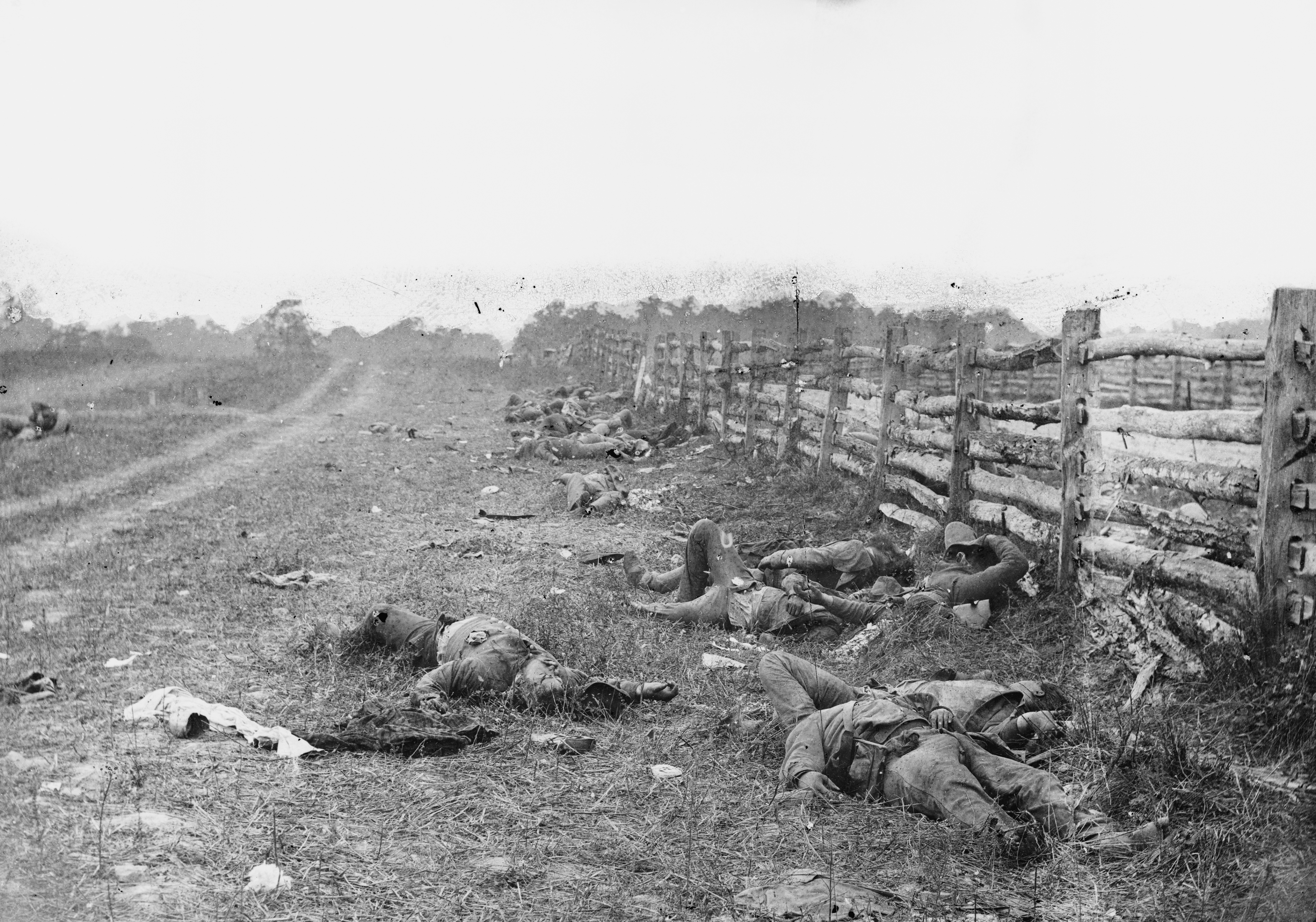
Dead Confederate soldiers from Starke's Louisiana Brigade, on the Hagerstown Turnpike, north of the Dunker Church

The armies met near the town of Sharpsburg by Antietam Creek. Although McClellan arrived in the area on September 16, his trademark caution delayed his attack on Lee, which gave the Confederates more time to prepare defensive positions and allowed Longstreet's corps to arrive from Hagerstown and Jackson's corps, minus A. P. Hill's division, to arrive from Harpers Ferry. McClellan's two-to-one advantage in the battle was almost completely nullified by a lack of coordination and concentration of Union forces, which allowed Lee to shift his defensive forces to parry each thrust.

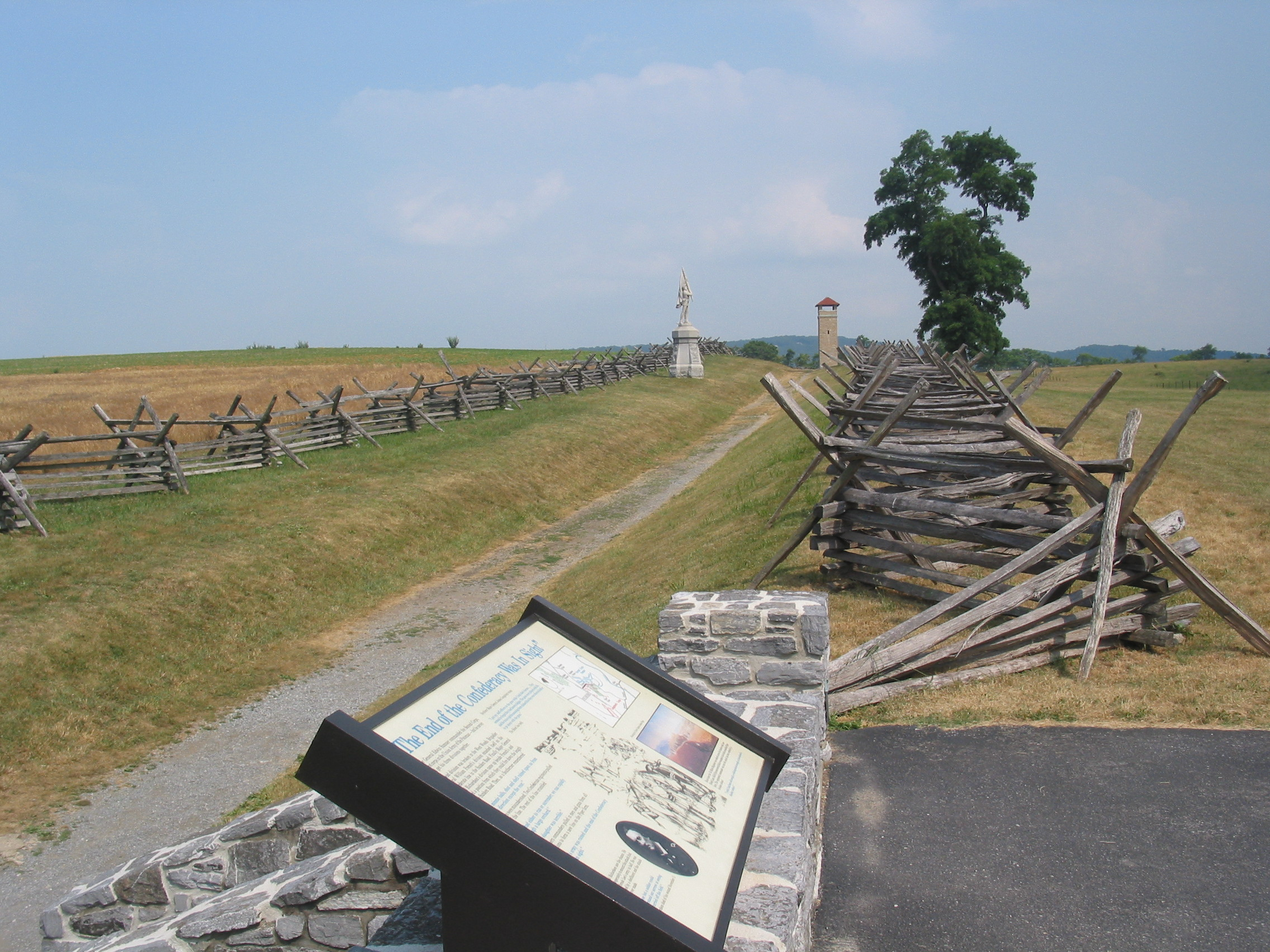
Antietam National Battlefield today

Although a tactical draw, the Battle of Antietam was considered a strategic Union victory and a turning point of the war. It forced the end of Lee's invasion of the North. It also was enough of a victory to enable President Lincoln to issue the Emancipation Proclamation, which took effect on January 1, 1863. He had been advised by his Cabinet to make the announcement after a Union victory, to avoid any perception that it was issued out of desperation. The Union's winning the Battle of Antietam also may have dissuaded the governments of France and Great Britain from recognizing the Confederacy. Some observers believed they might have done so in the aftermath of another Union defeat.

The Emancipation Proclamation did not emancipate enslaved people in Maryland. Slave states that remained loyal to the Union, such as Maryland, Delaware, Missouri, Kentucky, and eventually West Virginia were not included in the proclamation.Maryland did not abolish slavery until it adoped a new state constitution in 1864 with abolition going into effect on November 1, 1864.

== Maryland, 1865–1920 ==
=== Post-Civil War political developments ===
Since Maryland had remained in the Union during the Civil War, the state was not covered by the Reconstruction Act, as were states of the former Confederacy. After the war, many white Maryland residents struggled to re-establish white supremacy over Black Marylanders, and racial tensions rose. There were deep divisions in the state between those who fought for the North and those who fought for the South.

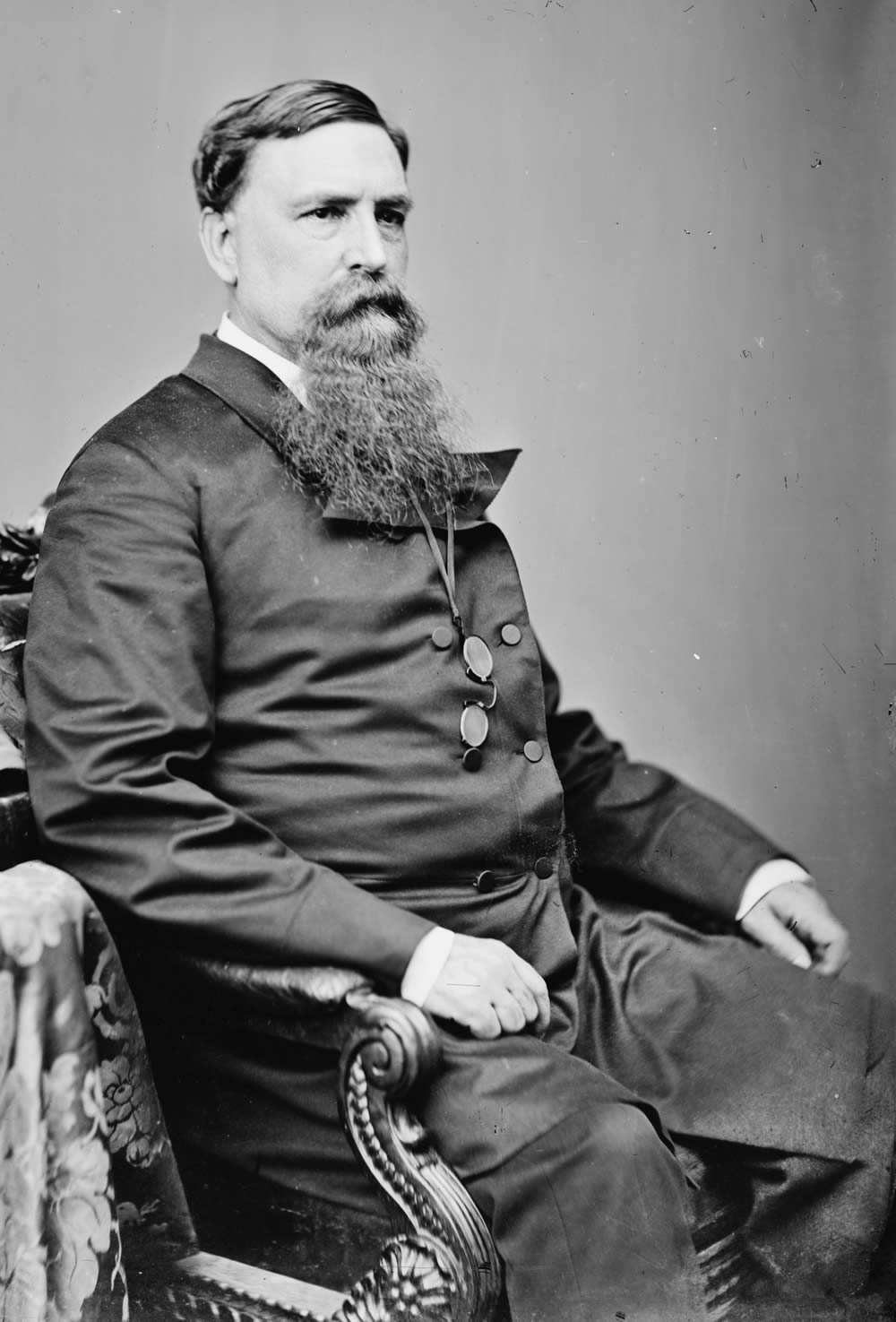
Thomas Swann, the only Governor of Maryland elected under the state's 1864 constitution

In the late 1860s, the white males of the Democratic Party rapidly regained power in the state and replaced Republicans who had been elected or appointed during the war. Support for the Constitution of 1864 ended, and Democrats replaced it with the Maryland Constitution of 1867. That document, which is still in effect today, resembled the 1851 constitution more than its immediate predecessor and was approved by 54.1% of the state's male population. It provided for the reapportionment of the legislature based on population, not counties, which gave greater political power to more dense urban areas (and, by extension, to freedmen), but the new constitution deprived African Americans of some of the protections of the 1864 document.

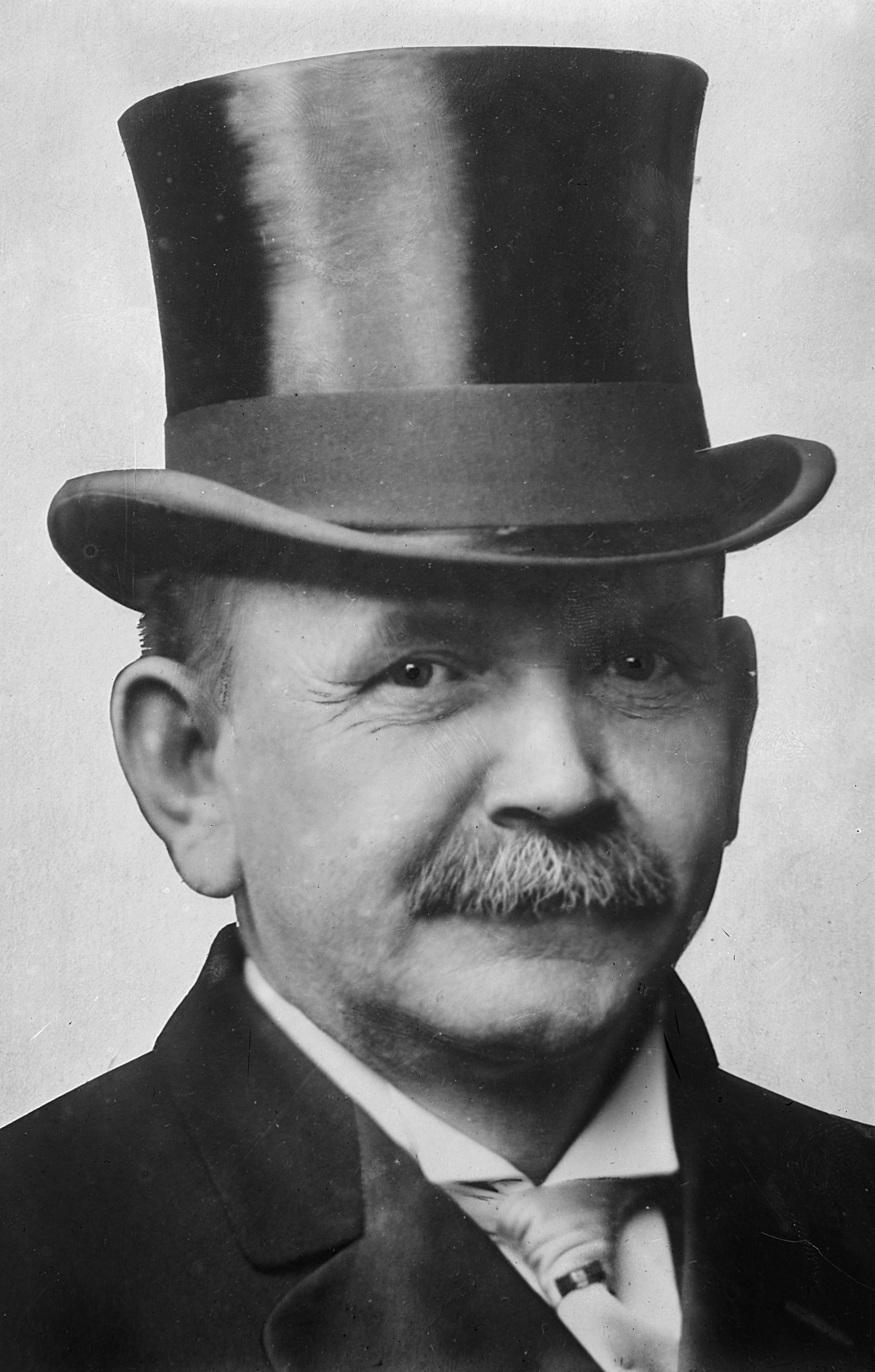
Austin Lane Crothers, the 46th Governor, supported the disfranchisement of black voters and poor whites

In 1896, a biracial Republican coalition gained election of Lloyd Lowndes, Jr. as governor, and also achieved election of some Republican congressmen, including Sydney Emanuel Mudd, after Democratic dominance. Over the next several decades, the African-American population struggled in a discriminatory environment. The Democrat-dominated male legislature tried to pass disfranchising bills in 1905, 1907, and 1911, but was rebuffed on each occasion, in large part because of black opposition and strength. Black men comprised 20% of the electorate and had established themselves in several cities, where they had comparative security. In addition, immigrant men comprised 15% of the voting population and opposed these measures. The legislature had difficulty devising requirements against blacks that did not also disadvantage immigrants.

=== Philanthropy ===
Businessmen Johns Hopkins, Enoch Pratt, George Peabody, and Henry Walters were philanthropists of 19th century Baltimore; they founded notable educational, health care, and cultural institutions in that city. Bearing their names, these include a university, free city library, music and art school, and art museum.

=== Poe Amendment ===
In 1904, John Prentiss Poe and Arthur Pue Gorman authored the "Poe Suffrage Amendment" which sought to disenfranchise African American voters in Maryland by implementing grandfather and "understanding" clauses. The "understanding" clause was a literacy test that would have required voters to read any section of the Constitution submitted to them and explain its meaning.This clause targeted African Americans who had unequal access to education and white immigrants who weren't proficient in English. The grandfather clause required voters to be a lineal male descendant of someone who could legally vote in 1869, which ruled out African American voters and white immigrants. The Negro Suffrage League and League of Foreign-Born Citizens fiercly opposed the amendment. Though the amendment passed in the Democrat controlled legislature in 1904, it was defeated at the polls, largely by African American and white Republican voters, in 1905. The statewide margin was 34,058 votes with 59.8 percent of the statewide vote against the amendment.

=== Straus Amendment ===
In 1909, there was another attempt made to disenfranchise Black voters. Attorney General of Maryland, Isaac Lobe Straus, was tasked by Governor Crothers with drafting a new constitutional amendment that would accomplish this goal. The Poe Amendment had largely been defeated in 1905 because Black voters and white immigrant voters had both campaigned against it. Learning from this, The Straus Amendment, as it became known, sought to gain white immigrant support by creating a grandfather clause that would include all immigrants naturalized from 1869 to the date the amendment would be ratified. However, this condition still excluded immigrants, particularly Italians, who had only recently applied for naturalization and were still classified as "aliens."The amendment had many opponents such as the Afro-American Newspaper, Charles J. Bonaparte, The Baltimore Suffrage League, and more. Ultimately, the amendment was defeated at the polls that same year by a statewide margin of 16, 261 votes with 54.2 percent of the statewide vote against the amendment.

=== Digges Amendment ===
In 1910, the legislature proposed the Digges Amendment to the state constitution. It would have used property requirements to effectively disfranchise many African American men as well as many poor white men (including new immigrants), a technique used by other southern states from 1890 to 1910, beginning with Mississippi's new constitution. The Maryland General Assembly passed the bill, which Governor Austin Lane Crothers supported. Before the measure went to popular vote, a bill was proposed that would have effectively passed the requirements of the Digges Amendment into law. Due to widespread public opposition, that measure failed, and the amendment was also rejected by 65% of the voters of Maryland.

Though women could note vote, Black women played a signficant role in defeating the amendment. Eliza Cummings, mother of Baltimore's first Black city councilman, Harry Sythe Cummings, formed the "Anti-Digges Amendment League" which campaigned against the amendment by knocking on doors and giving public speeches.

=== Progressive era reforms ===
In the early 20th century, a political reform movement arose, centered in the rising new middle class. One of their main goals included having government jobs granted on the basis of merit rather than patronage. Other changes aimed to reduce the power of political bosses and machines, which they succeeded in doing.

In a series of laws passed between 1892 and 1908, reformers worked for standard state-issued ballots (rather than those distributed and pre-marked by the parties); obtained closed voting booths to prevent party workers from "assisting" voters; initiated primary elections to keep party bosses from selecting candidates; and had candidates listed without party symbols, which discouraged the illiterate from participating. Although promoted as democratic reforms, the changes had other results sought by the middle class. They discouraged participation by the lower classes and illiterate voters. Voting participation dropped from about 82% of eligible voters in the 1890s to about 49% in the 1920s.

Other laws regulated working conditions. For instance, in a series of laws passed in 1902, the state regulated conditions in mines; outlawed child laborers under the age of 12; mandated compulsory school attendance; and enacted the nation's first workers' compensation law. The workers' compensation law was overturned in the courts, but was redrafted and finally enacted in 1910. Despite the 1902 law, child labor continued into the 1920s as evidenced by incident reports and new stories involving young children, such as a "13-year old boy was fatally injured when his clothing caught and he was drawn into the machinery." Child labor in Maryland was also documented by photographer, Lewis Hine, who documented child labor throughout the U.S. between 1908 and 1924. Hine's photographs of child labor in Maryland showed children working in canning and packing factories in Baltimore and in berry fields outside of the city.

The debate over prohibition of alcohol, another progressive reform, led to Maryland's gaining its second nickname. A mocking newspaper editorial dubbed Maryland "the Free State" for its allowing alcohol.

=== Great Baltimore Fire ===
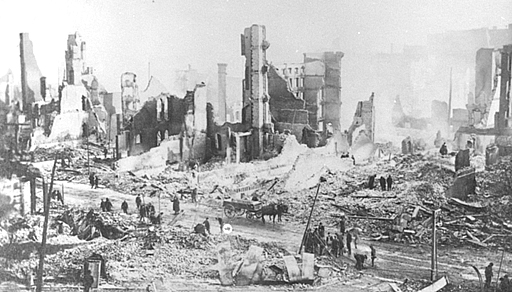
The aftermath of the Great Baltimore Fire of 1904

The Great Baltimore Fire of 1904 was a momentous event for Maryland's largest city and the state as a whole. The fire raged in Baltimore from 10:48 am. Sunday, February 7, to 5:00 pm. Monday, February 8, 1904. More than 1,231 firefighters worked to bring the blaze under control.

One reason for the fire's duration was the lack of national standards in fire-fighting equipment. Although fire engines from nearby cities (such as Philadelphia and Washington, as well as units from New York City, Wilmington, and Atlantic City) responded, many were useless because their hose couples failed to fit Baltimore hydrants. As a result, the fire burned over 30 hours, destroying 1,526 buildings and spanning 70 city blocks.

In the aftermath, 35,000 people were left unemployed. After the fire, the city was rebuilt using more fireproof materials, such as granite pavers.

=== The World War I era ===
Entry into World War I brought changes to Maryland.

Maryland was the site of new military bases, such as Camp Meade (now Fort Meade), the Aberdeen Proving Ground, which were established in 1917, and the Edgewood Arsenal, which was founded the following year. Other existing facilities, including Fort McHenry, were greatly expanded.

To coordinate wartime activities, like the expansion of federal facilities, the General Assembly set up a Council of Defense. The 126 seats on the council were filled by appointment. The council, which had a virtually unlimited budget, was charged with defending the state, supervising the draft, maintaining wage and price controls, providing housing for war-related industries, and promoting support for the war. Citizens were encouraged to grow their own victory gardens and to obey ration laws. They were also forced to work, once the legislature adopted a compulsory labor law with the support of the Council of Defense.

=== Culture ===
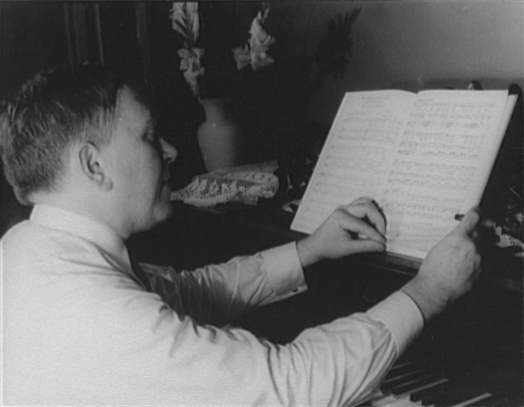
H. L. Mencken in 1932

H. L. Mencken (1880–1956) was the state's iconoclastic writer and intellectual trendsetter. In 1922 the "Sage of Baltimore" praised the state for its "singular and various beauty from the stately estuaries of the Chesapeake to the peaks of the Blue Ridge." He happily reported that Providence had spared Maryland the harsh weather, the decay, the intractable social problems of other states. Statistically, Maryland held tightly to the middle ground– in population, value of manufacturers, percentage of native whites, the proportion of Catholics, the first and last annual frost. Everywhere he looked he found Maryland in the middle. In national politics it worked sometimes with the northern Republicans, other times with southern Democrats. This average quality perhaps represented a national ideal toward which other states were striving. Nevertheless, Mencken sensed something was wrong. "Men are ironed out. Ideas are suspect. No one appears to be happy. Life is dull."

== Maryland, early to mid-20th century ==
=== The Ritchie administration ===
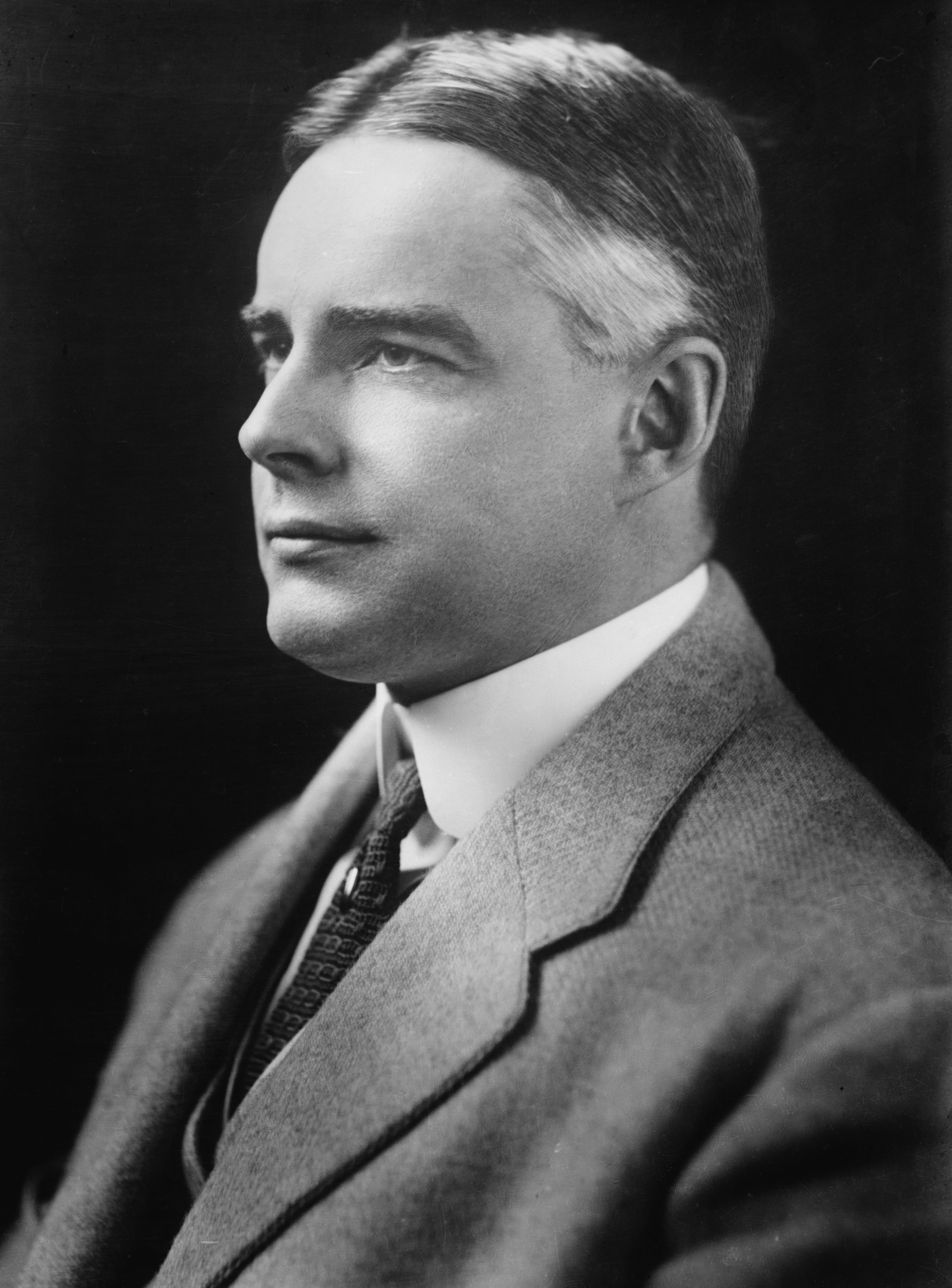
Albert C. Ritchie, elected to his first of five terms in 1918, is probably the most popular governor in state history.

In 1918, Maryland elected Albert C. Ritchie, a Democrat, governor. He was reelected four times, serving from 1919 to 1934. Ritchie was handsome, aristocratic, and very pro-business. He hired a management firm to streamline government operations and established a budget process controlled largely by economists. He also won approval for a civil service system, long been sought by reformers who wanted positions given on the basis of merit and not patronage; reduced the number of state elections by extending legislative terms from two to four years; and appointed citizens' commissions to advise on nearly every aspect of government. State property taxes dropped sharply under Ritchie, but so did state services. A powerful movie censorship board kept subversive ideas away from the masses. Three times, including 1924 and 1932, Ritchie was a candidate for President of the United States, arguing that Presidents Coolidge and Hoover were hopeless spendthrifts. Ritchie lost his bid for the Democratic Party's nomination for president in 1932. Despite a large demonstration of support at the convention, Franklin D. Roosevelt was nominated and went on to win the election. Ritchie continued to serve as governor until 1935.

=== The Great Depression and World War II ===
Maryland's urban and rural communities had different experiences during the Depression. In 1932 the "Bonus Army" marched through the state on its way to Washington, D.C. In addition to the nationwide New Deal reforms of President Roosevelt, which put people to work building roads and park facilities, Maryland also took steps to weather the hard times. For instance, in 1937 the state instituted its first ever income tax to generate revenue for schools and welfare.

The state had some advances in civil rights. The 1935 case Murray v. Pearson et al. resulted in a Baltimore City Court's ordering integration of University of Maryland Law School. The plaintiff in that case was represented by Thurgood Marshall, a young lawyer with the NAACP and a native of Baltimore. When the state attorney general appealed to the Court of Appeals, it affirmed the decision. Because the state did not appeal the ruling in the federal courts, this state ruling under the U.S. Constitution was the first to overturn Plessy v. Ferguson, the 1896 Supreme Court decision that allowed separate but equal facilities. While the ruling was a moral precedent, it had no authority outside the state of Maryland.

A hurricane in 1933 created an inlet in Sinepuxent Bay at Ocean City, making the then-small town attractive for recreational fishing.

Bethlehem Fairfield Shipyard, 1943

During World War II additional large defense facilities were established in the state such as Andrews Air Force Base, Patuxent River Naval Air Station, and the large Glenn L. Martin aircraft factory east of Baltimore. Bethlehem Steel's Fairfield Yard also produced Liberty Ships during the war.

During the war, Maryland born fashion designer, Claire McCardell, designed Civil Defense uniforms. Wartime fabric rationing of wool and silk influenced McCardell's use of denim, calico, jersey, and surplus weather balloon fabric. With women performing more labor during the war, McCardell designed a popular utility dress for women called the Pop-over.

=== Mid-20th century ===
In 1952, the eastern and western halves of Maryland were linked for the first time by the long Chesapeake Bay Bridge, which replaced a nearby ferry service. This bridge (and its later, parallel span) increased tourist traffic to Ocean City, which experienced a building boom. Soon after, the Baltimore Harbor Tunnel allowed long-distance interstate motorists to bypass downtown Baltimore, while the earlier Harry W. Nice Memorial Bridge allowed them to bypass Washington, D.C. Two beltways, I-695 and I-495, were built around Baltimore and Washington, while I-70, I-270, and later I-68 linked central Maryland with western Maryland, and I-97 linked Baltimore with Annapolis. Passenger and freight steamboat transportation, previously very important throughout the Chesapeake Bay and its many tributaries, came to an end in mid-century.

=== Civil Rights Era ===
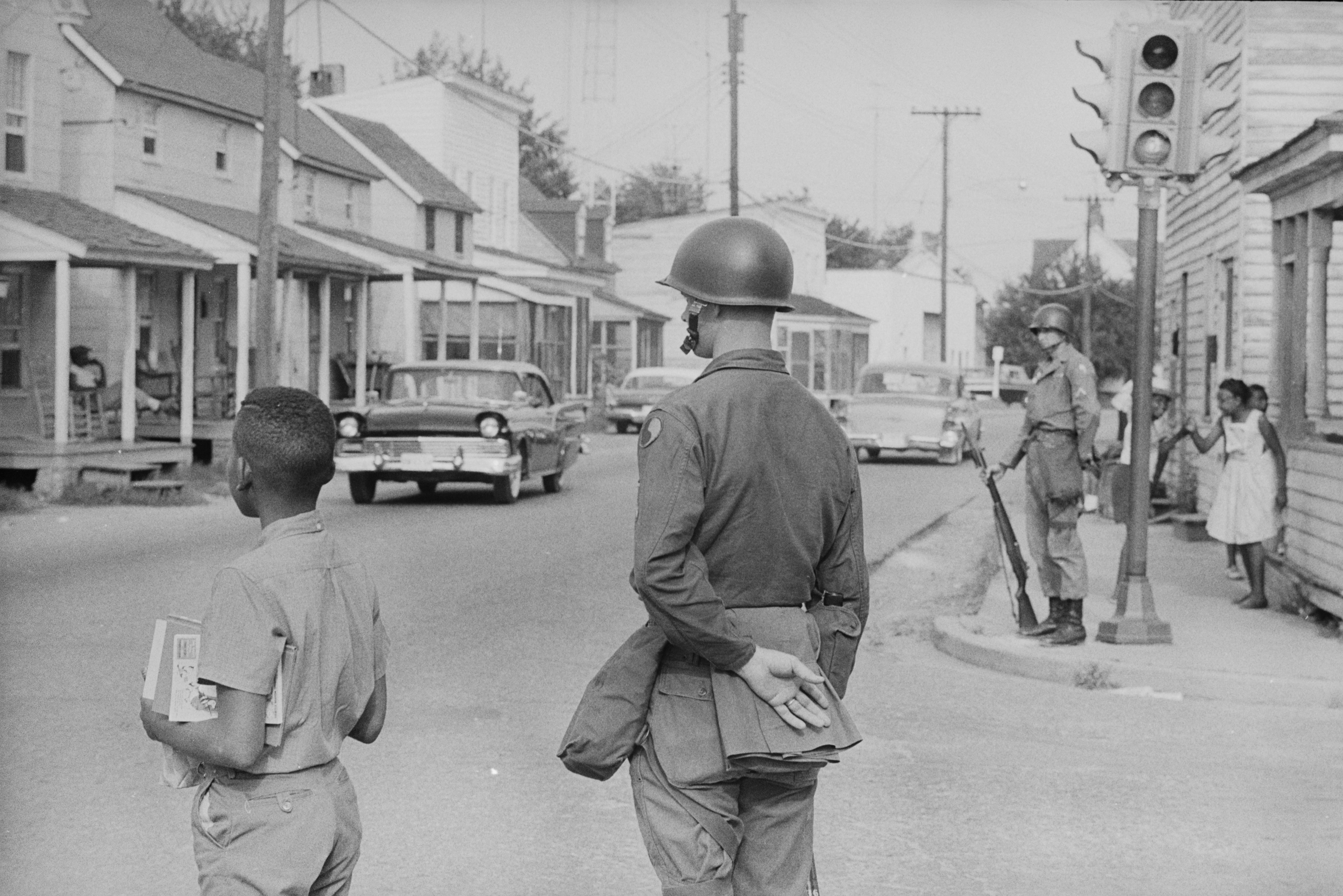
African-Americans and Maryland National Guard troops on the street, during a period when demonstrations against segregation were held in Cambridge, Maryland, in 1963

Jim Crow laws existed throughout much of the state until the 1960s. Notable events during this era in Maryland include the desegregation of Glen Echo Park in 1961, the desegregation of Gwynn Oak Park in 1963, The Cambridge Movement of 1963, The Cambridge Movement of 1967, the Route 40 Freedom Rides in 1961, and more.

== Maryland, late 20th century to present ==
In 1980, the opening of Harborplace and the Baltimore Aquarium made that city a significant tourist destination, while Charles Center, the World Trade Center, and the popular Camden Yards baseball stadium were constructed in the downtown area. Fells Point also became popular. The historic Annapolis waterfront area, previously a working-class fishing port, also became gentrified and a tourist destination. Baltimore's largest employer, the Bethlehem Steel factory at Sparrows Point, shrunk, and the General Motors plant closed, while Johns Hopkins University and Health Care System took Bethlehem's place as Baltimore's largest employer. There are over 350 biotechnology companies in the state. The Social Security – Health Care Financing Administration, Bureau of Standards, U.S. Census Bureau, National Institutes of Health, National Security Agency, and Public Health Service have their headquarters in the state. Metrorail lines were constructed in Montgomery and Prince George's counties, while Baltimore opened its own 20 miles (32 km) Metro Subway as well as the north–south Baltimore Light Rail system.

In addition to general suburban growth, specially planned new communities sprung up, most notably Columbia, but also Montgomery Village, Belair at Bowie, St. Charles, Cross Keys, and Joppatowne, and numerous shopping malls, the state's three largest malls being Annapolis Mall, Arundel Mills and the Towson Town Center. Community colleges were established in nearly every county in Maryland. Large-scale, mechanized poultry farms became prevalent on the lower Eastern Shore, along with irrigated vegetable farming. In Southern Maryland tobacco farming had nearly vanished by the century's end, due to suburban housing development and a state tobacco incentive buy-out program. Industrial, railroad, and coal-mining jobs in the four westernmost counties declined, but that area's economy was helped by expansion of outdoor recreational tourism and new technology jobs and industries. From the beginning of the 21st century, Maryland joined neighboring states in a new initiative to save the health of Chesapeake Bay, whose aquatic life and seafood industry are threatened by waterfront residential development, as well as by fertilizer and livestock waste entering the bay, especially from Pennsylvania's Susquehanna River. In addition, about 580 acres (230 ha) of Maryland shore are eroded per year due to the land sinking and rising sea levels. In 2013, Maryland abolished capital punishment.

=== Key Bridge collapse ===
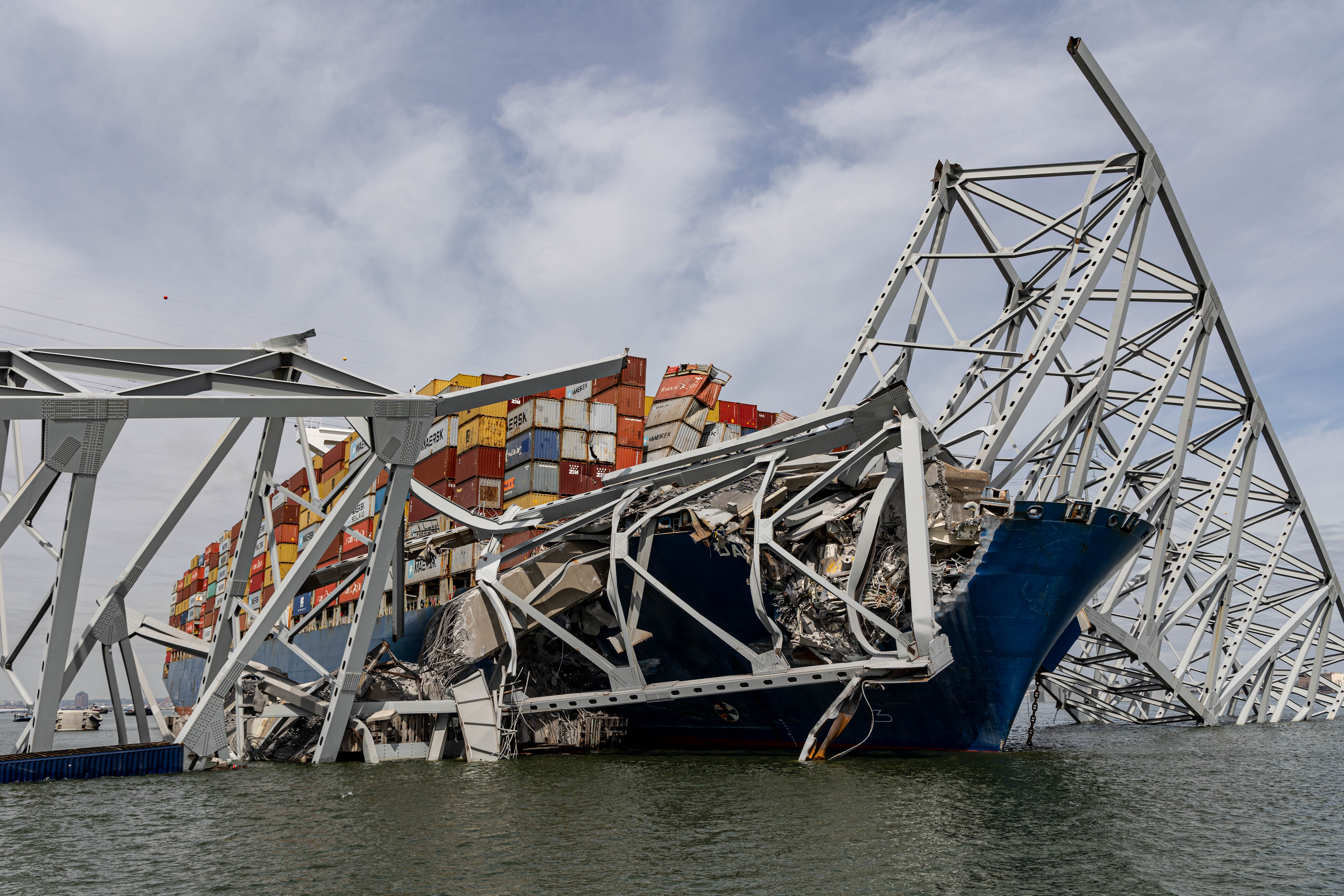
MV Dali immobilized by the wreckage of the Key Bridge

On March 26, 2024, the Francis Scott Key Bridge in Baltimore collapsed after the container ship Dali collided with it. The collapse caused the death of 6 construction workers.

Dali struck one of the piers of the Key Bridge at 1:28 a.m. EDT (05:28 UTC) after suffering a "complete blackout". The bridge collapse resulted in the blockage of shipping to and from the Port of Baltimore. The closure of the port is estimated to cost $1.7 billion in supply chain disruptions. On April 25, 2024, a newly opened channel allowed trapped ships to leave the Port of Baltimore.

== See also ==
- Outline of Maryland#History of Maryland
- Government of Maryland
- Colonial South and the Chesapeake
- History of the Southern United States
- History of Washington, D.C.
- List of historical societies in Maryland
- List of people from Maryland
- Timeline of Baltimore
- African Americans in Maryland
- Maryland in the American Civil War
- History of slavery in Maryland
