= William Harrison Jr. =

American planter and revolutionary from Maryland (c. 1750–1789)

William Harrison Jr. (c. 1750 – July 21, 1789) was an American planter from Charles County, Maryland. He was a delegate for Maryland in the Continental Congress of 1786 and 1787.

Harrison was an active revolutionary in Charles County. He served in the local militia, and as a representative in 1775 to the state's revolutionary assembly, the Annapolis Convention. In 1778 he was named as a justice of the peace for Charles County, and reappointed regularly until 1785.
