= John Hall (Maryland politician) =

American lawyer from Maryland (1729-1797)

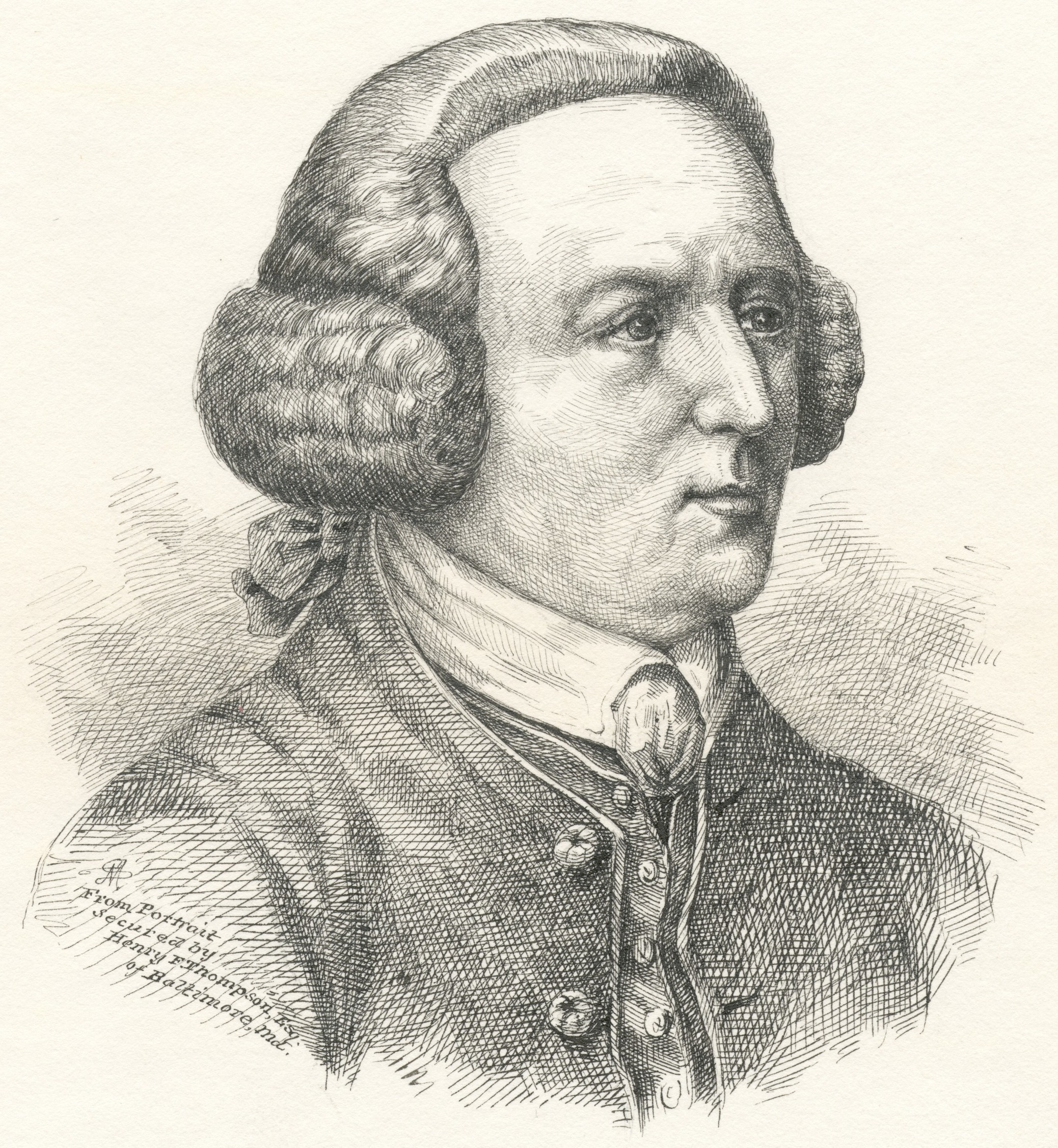
- Born: November 1729
- Died: March 8, 1797 (aged 67)
- Occupation: Politician, lawyer

John Hall (November 1729 – March 8, 1797) was an American lawyer from Annapolis, Maryland. During the American Revolution he was a member of the council of safety, a delegate to the Maryland convention in 1775, and Maryland delegate to the Continental Congress in 1775.
