= Richard Brooke (physician) =

American physician, surgeon, politician and slaveholder

Richard Brooke (June 2, 1716 – July 13, 1783) was an American physician, surgeon, politician, and slaveholder.

== Early life ==
Richard Brooke was born in Prince George's Province, Maryland, to Thomas Brooke and Lucy Smith. He married Rachel Gantt in 1767. Together, they had three children: Frederick Thomas Brooke, Sarah Brooke, and Thomas Brooke.

It is unknown where he pursued his education. After attaining the M.D. degree, he began regularly contributing to The Philosophical Transactions of the Royal Society of London and Gentleman's Magazine. His entries touched on issues such as smallpox inoculation, weather, lightning rods, lice, and the eradication of mouth-pimples.

However, Brooke wrote not only about the medical and scientific, but the political as well, as he entered into public life in Maryland after he inherited part of his father's estate in 1744. While in office, he made enemies of multiple governors of his home state, as well as Roman Catholics (despite some of his family being of the persuasion), and ultimately the British Empire as he became a staunch supporter of the American Revolution. He was elected as a member to the American Philosophical Society in 1769.

He represented Prince George's Province at the Provincial Maryland Convention (1775), and signed the Declaration of the Association of Freemen of Maryland.

He died and was laid to rest at his estate, Brookefield.

== Career ==
Richard Brooke was the First Scientific Observer in Maryland, Johns Hopkins University.
