= Maryland Constitution of 1776 =

First constitution adopted by the U.S. state of Maryland

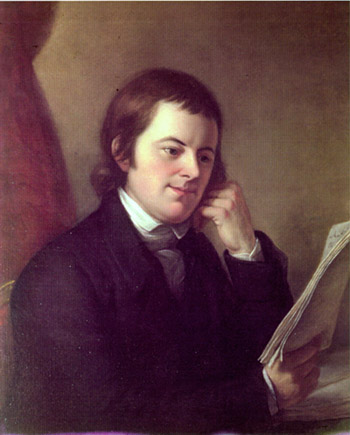
Thomas Johnson, who was a delegate to the Maryland Constitutional Convention of 1776 and was later elected as the first Governor of Maryland under the 1776 constitution.

The Maryland Constitution of 1776 was the first of four constitutions under which the U.S. state of Maryland has been governed. It was that state's basic law from its adoption in 1776 until the Maryland Constitution of 1851 took effect on July 4 of that year.

== Background and drafting ==
In the months before the beginning of the American Revolutionary War, a group of powerful Marylanders formed an association that eventually took the form of a convention in Annapolis. This group made preparations to form a new government for Maryland and sent representatives to participate in the Continental Congress.

The eighth session decided that the continuation of an ad hoc government by the convention was not a good mechanism for governing the state and that a more permanent and structured government was needed. So, on July 3, 1776, they resolved that a new convention be elected that would be responsible for drawing up their first state constitution, one that did not refer to parliament or the king, but would be a government "...of the people only." This being said, the elite men that had power in the original colonial government did not want to lose this power under a new constitution. They wanted to democratize the government as little as possible in order to stay in power but also to stop any sort of uprising from gaining traction. The committee of men creating the constitution were very wealthy and notable in their society including Charles Carroll of Carrollton and William Paca.

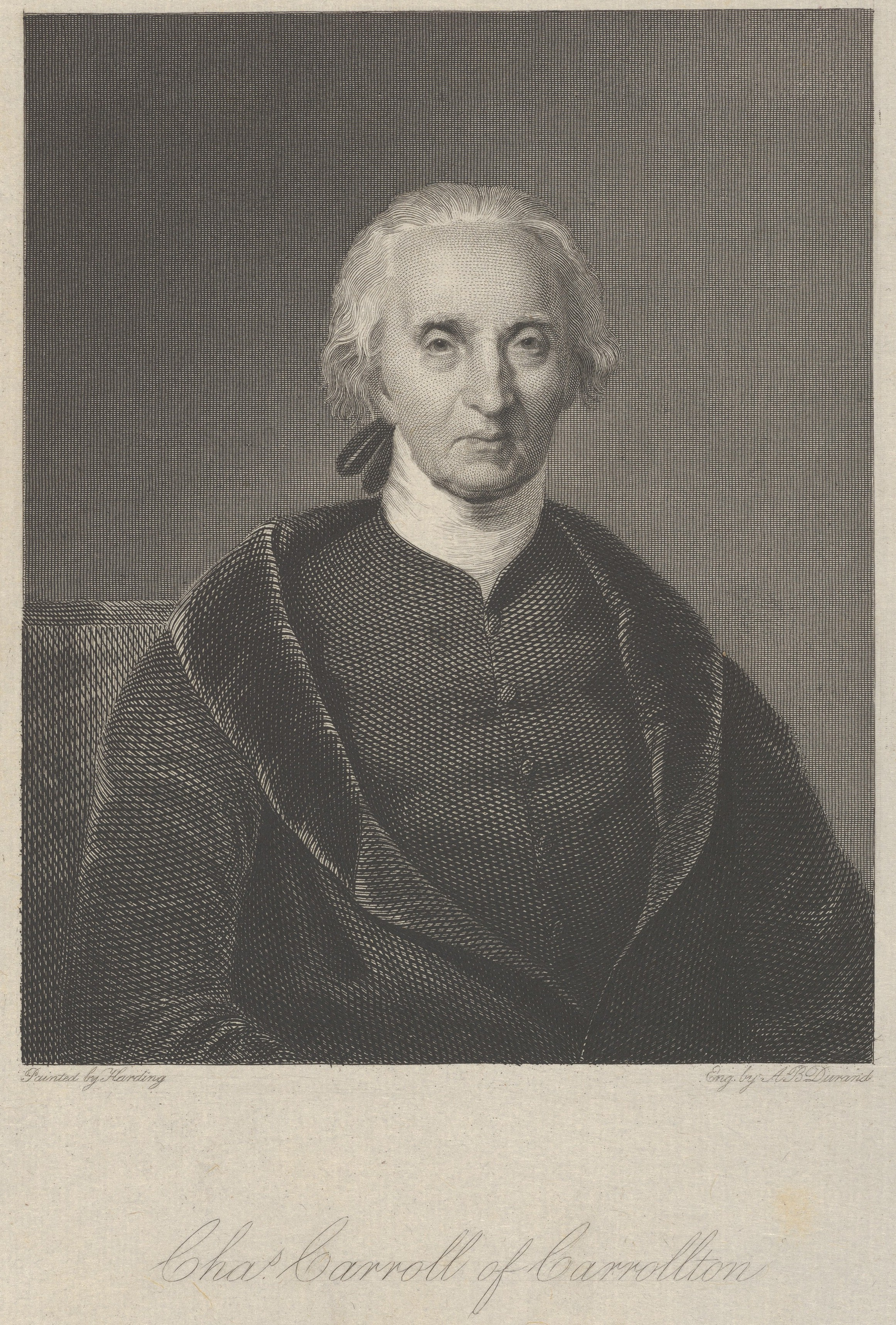
Charles Carroll of Carrolton, who helped create the Maryland Constitution.

On August 1, all freemen with property elected delegates for the Maryland Constitutional Convention of 1776. They began meeting on August 14, drafted the constitution, and adjourned on November 11. The document was not submitted to the people for ratification. The Assembly of Freemen would not meet again, as it was replaced by the new state government established by the 1776 constitution. Thomas Johnson became the state's first elected governor.

== Pre-Constitution Structure of Government ==
Before the Maryland Constitution of 1776, Maryland had a powerful governor that was appointed by the king of England. These governors had veto power over everything and authority over the entire state government. Each governor ruled over Maryland with concern for the needs of the British government. Underneath of them was one unicameral assembly that did not hold much power. The government was not split into branches as it was after the constitution with legislative and executive, but was rather one unit. Citizens that were qualified to vote based on property requirements were only able to vote for one office, which was their representative in the assembly. In addition to property restrictions, there were also restrictions based on religion as you were only able to be Christian and a Protestant in order to hold citizenship.

== Declaration of Rights ==
The document included a Declaration of Rights. This, among other things, ended the position of the Church of England as the state-supported religion, and granted all Christians, including Roman Catholics, freedom of worship. Free Black men who met the property qualifications continued to be eligible to vote. The declaration was more than a bill of rights, which enunciates certain rights which are reserved to the people. The declaration stated that all power emanated from the people and that the governors were accountable to the people. Despite this statement, the Maryland government was one of the least democratic of the period. While the power of the government came from a wider group of people, they were all mainly very wealthy and not representative of the population as a whole. The Declaration of Rights also separated the executive, legislative, and judicial branches of government.

== Creation of government ==
Before the 1776 constitution, Maryland had a very simple form of government without separate branches for legislative, executive, and judicial power. The 1776 constitution defined the Maryland General Assembly, a bicameral legislature consisting of the Maryland House of Delegates and Maryland State Senate. It acknowledged the power of county governments in administering their own affairs, and called for separate treasurers and land registrars on Maryland's Eastern and Western Shores. The constitution stipulated that new amendments could be passed by two consecutive sessions of the house of delegates.

== Fears of Concentrations of Power ==
The American Revolution caused many citizens to fear a powerful executive similar to the king of England. This caused many states, Maryland included, to try to step away from having concentrations of power at the top of the system. In order to combat this, Maryland had a much weaker governor under their new constitution. The governor had no veto power and could not make any major decisions on his own.The Governor was elected every year and was able to serve three terms before being required to step down. In the event that someone served as Governor for all three terms, they had to wait four years before being allowed to run again. The Governor also had a council of advisors. Together, the Governor and advisors appointed most of the positions in the state and county. Continuing the trend of giving more power to the people, Maryland followed the other states in allowing the legislative branch to have more authority than was previously delegated.

== Elite Fight for Control ==
While there was work done to make the state government more republican, Maryland elites were also desperate to keep control in this time of revolution. They did this through the Maryland Senate that would act as a check on the lower Maryland House of Delegates. There were higher property requirements needed to run for the Senate and therefore it would be filled with the gentry rather than average citizens. These property requirements made it very difficult for the vast majority of people to be included in the government. To run for the House of Delegates, it was required to own £500 of property. To run for the Senate, the property requirement to run was £1000. The Governor was required to have £5000 of property. This allowed for only the wealthiest 10 percent of men to hold office of any kind. This ensured that while the government was significantly more democratic, the most elite members of society were still the ones in charge.

The wealthy also controlled who held power in Maryland by having property requirements for voting. In order to vote for representatives in the House, the person must have 50 acres of land or £30 of property. For the Senate, 2 electors from the House were chosen from each county and they must have £500 worth of property. The governor was elected by the Senate and the House. The only positions up for election by citizens not in positions of power was their delegate in the House of Delegates and their local sheriff.

== Elections and the franchise ==
Most of the people living in Maryland at this time were disenfranchised. Despite the declaration that all power emanates from the people, the document kept political power in the hands of the male citizens who met a minimum property requirement. When adopted, the 1776 constitution allowed 20,000 of the 300,000+ people living in Maryland to vote.

Slaves and women could not vote, nor did they have equal rights to men. Women were not allowed to vote as they were considered dependent on their husbands or their fathers. Enslaved people were also considered dependents and not citizens so therefore they were disenfranchised. Free black men who met the property qualifications were technically eligible to vote. However, the property requirements for voting were so high that it was very unlikely for free black men to reach this status in Maryland at this time. The constitution extended voting rights to include Catholics but did not include any non-Christians. Only about 55 percent of white men were allowed to vote under the new constitution mainly because of property requirement restrictions. White freemen had to have £30 of property in order to vote which excluded much of the poorer population such as tenant farmers. Voting was also done by voice which means that each vote was not secret. Only Christians could hold office until 1826, when legislation was adopted allowing Jews to hold office and have equal rights and privileges with Christians.

They directly elected delegates to the Maryland General Assembly and indirectly elected State Senators. Voters would elect Senatorial Electors every five years. These men would then meet together to elect a fifteen-member Senate, nine members from the Western Shore and six from the Eastern Shore. If a Senate vacancy occurred between elections, the Senate selected a replacement. The Governor was elected by the joint legislature, not the people directly. And most local offices were appointed by the Governor, with the concurrence of his Executive Council.

== Subsequent history ==
Most average people were very upset with the new form of government as it was not very democratic. Without many ways to participate in their government, many people turned to protests to fight back against the constitution. The 1776 constitution was amended 66 times, most notably in 1837, to, among other things, provide for a popularly elected governor, instead of one chosen by the legislature. The constitution was initially about 8,800 words long. The several amendments added to it between 1792 and 1846 brought its total length to about 15,200 words.

Free black men who met the property requirement could vote until 1810, when the General Assembly ratified a constitutional amendment (approved by the 1809 assembly) to change "freemen" to "free white men" in Article 2 of the Constitution.

== See also ==
- Antisemitism in Maryland
- Government of Maryland
- History of Maryland
- History of slavery in Maryland
- History of the United States (1776–1789)
- List of delegates to the Maryland Constitutional Convention (1776)
- Maryland Constitution of 1867
- Maryland Constitution of 1864
- Maryland Constitution of 1851
- State constitution (United States)
