= Peregrine Tilghman =

American politician (1741–1807)

Peregrine Tilghman (January 24, 1741 – September 20, 1807) was an American politician, judge and planter from Maryland. He was a member of the Maryland Senate, representing Talbot County from 1787 to 1788.

== Early life ==
Peregrine Tilghman was born on January 24, 1741, in Queen Anne's County, Maryland, to Susanna (née Frisby) and Richard Tilghman. His father was a justice of the provincial court.

== Career ==
He was a member of the 1777 Maryland Convention, representing Talbot County. He was colonel of the 4th battalion of Talbot County. He was appointed purchasing agent for the Continental Army in March 1778 and resigned in April 1778.

Tilghman was a justice from 1777 to 1778. He was appointed justice of the Orphans' Court and tax commissioner of Talbot County in 1778. He was a member of the Maryland Senate, representing the eastern shore, from 1787 to 1791. He was a planter.

== Personal life ==
Tilghman married Deborah Lloyd, daughter of Colonel Robert Lloyd. They had three sons and two daughters, Robert Lloyd (1778–1823), Tench (1782–1827), William Hensley (1784–1863), Anna Marie (1774–1858) and Elizabeth. Anna Marie married Judge Nicholas Brice of Baltimore. He was an Anglican and a vestryman at St. Michael's Parish in Talbot County.

Tilghman moved from Queen Anne's County to Talbot County between 1803 and 1804. He then lived in Hope House on Miles River in Talbot County on land previously owned by Robert Lloyd. At the time of his death, he owned 2,051 acres (830 ha) of land in Talbot County.

Tilghman died on September 20, 1807, at his home in Talbot County.
