= Maryland Constitution of 1851 =

Second constitution of Maryland

The Maryland Constitution of 1851 was the second constitution of the U.S. state of Maryland following the revolution, replacing the Constitution of 1776.

The primary reason for the new constitution was a need to re-apportion Maryland's legislature, the Maryland General Assembly. It also permitted a change in the status of the City of Baltimore (designated as a "port of entry" in 1706, chartered as a town in 1729, incorporated in 1796–97, and county seat since 1768) and its relationship with the surrounding Baltimore County (which was erected in 1659). By the provisions of this 1851 Constitution, Baltimore City was to be separated and given the status of the other (soon-to-be) 23 counties of the State, with a provision of "home rule", which was later extended in 1923. By 1854, Baltimore County by election of its voters had moved its county seat and courts to Towsontown, north of the city and began building a new courthouse. However, there were several critiques of the Constitution of 1851, especially in changes in how the judiciary functioned which allowed for gaps in judiciary oversight. These critiques led to the relatively rapid adoption of a new Constitution of 1864.

During the 1700s and 1800s, many states in the United States allowed male non-citizens to vote. Anti-Irish Catholic sentiment and anti-German Catholic sentiment following the War of 1812 and intensifying again in the 1840s lead many states, particularly in the Northeast, to amend their constitutions to prohibit non-citizens from voting, including Maryland in 1851.
