= Charles Ridgely (disambiguation) =

Charles Ridgely usually refers to Charles Carnan Ridgely (1760–1829), Governor of Maryland, United States.

Charles Ridgely may also refer to:

- Charles Ridgely II ("Charles the Merchant", 1702–1772), planter, merchant, and ironmonger, son of Charles Ridgely I ("Charles the Planter")
- Charles Ridgely III ("Charles the Mariner", 1733–1790), son of Charles Ridgely II
- Charles G. Ridgely (1784–1848), naval officer, nephew of Charles Ridgely III
- Charles G. Ridgely, assemblyman for Kent County at the 4th Delaware General Assembly, 1779
- Charles Ridgely (1838–1872), son of Eliza Ridgely, grandson of Charles Carnan Ridgely
- Charles Sterrett Ridgely (1782–1847), American land developer and legislator, great-nephew of Charles Ridgely III
