= Gustavus Scott =

American lawyer (1753–1800)

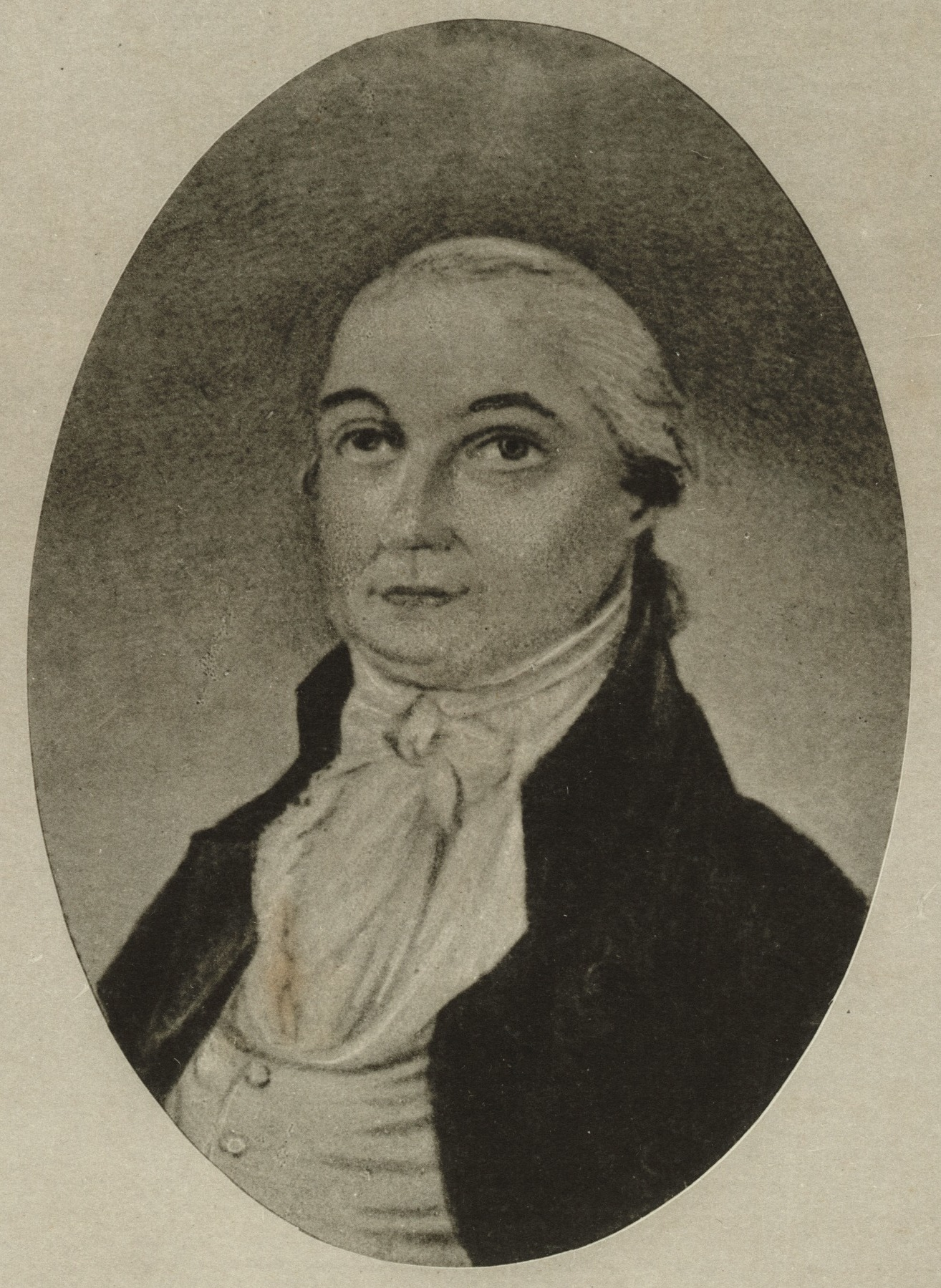

Member of the Maryland House of Delegates from Dorchester County
- In office 1780

Delegate to the Confederation Congress from Maryland
- In office 1784

4th Commissioner of the Federal City
- In office August 23, 1794 – December 25, 1800
- Preceded by: Thomas Johnson
- Succeeded by: William Cranch

Personal details
- Born: 1753 "Westwood", Prince William County, Virginia
- Died: December 25, 1800 (aged 47) Washington, District of Columbia, United States
- Resting place: Fairfax, Virginia, United States
- Party: Federalist
- Spouse: Margaret Hall (m. 1777)
- Education: King's College, Aberdeen, Scotland; Middle Temple, London,
- Profession: lawyer, farmer

Gustavus Scott (1753 – December 25, 1800) was an American lawyer who served in several legislative capacities in Maryland during and after the American Revolutionary War, as well as farmed in Fairfax County, Virginia, and served as one of the commissioners superintending the erection of public buildings in the new federal city (Washington, D.C.) from 1794 to 1800.

== Early and family life ==
Scott was born at "Westwood" in Prince William County, Virginia. His father, Rev. James Scott (1715–1782), was the rector of Dettingen parish, and friend of patriots George Washington and George Mason, as well as a planter. While the site of the former house is now within the Quantico Marine Corps base, much of the former plantation is now Prince William Forest Park. Rev. Scott sent Gustavus and his brother to Scotland for their higher education. In 1765 Gustavus studied at King's College in Aberdeen, then entered the Middle Temple in London, England, in 1767, and completed his law studies in 1771. His sister Christian (1745–1815) married Col. Thomas Blackburn, a revolutionary war officer who became planter in Prince William County.

Gustavus Scott married Margaret Hall Caile in Dorchester County in 1777. They had at least three sons. Their Princeton-educated son Gustavus Hall Jr. (born 1786) would move eventually to Crawfordville, Indiana. Their middle son Major William Bushrod Scott (1792–1857) lived in Washington, D.C., and was affiliated with the Washington Navy Yard. Lt. Robert James Scott (1798–1834) became a sutler after graduating from the U.S. Military Academy and military service, and died at Fort Monroe, Virginia. His Fairfax-County born sons (this man's grandsons) remained loyal to the Union during the American Civil War--Gustavus H. Scott (1812–1882) became a Rear Admiral of the United States Navy, Robert Wainright Scott (1827–1866) became Lt.Commander in the Navy, and another became railroad executive and Pennsylvania Congressman William Lawrence Scott (1828–1891).

== Career ==
Upon returning from the UK, Scott settled on Maryland's Eastern Shore and married. After admission to the Maryland bar, he practiced in Somerset County. He became a delegate to the Annapolis Convention in 1774 and 1775, and subsequently a member of the Association of the Freemen of Maryland. Scott was a member of the first state constitutional convention in 1776. He moved to Dorchester County, Maryland, and was member of the Maryland House of Delegates in 1780.

Fellow legislators elected Scott to the Confederation Congress in 1784, but he did not attend. He resumed the practice of law and moved to Montgomery County, Maryland, in 1794. He was appointed one of the commissioners of the Federal City, in which he oversaw the erection of the public buildings in Washington, D.C., from 1794 until his death in 1800. He served with William Thornton replacing David Stuart and Maryland governor Thomas Johnson.

Although his father died in Prince William County in 1782, Gustavus Scott owned land but no slaves in Fairfax County in 1787.

== Death and legacy ==
Scott died in Washington, D.C., survived by his widow, and was buried on his farm in Virginia. Both were later reburied in the Fairfax City cemetery.
