= Turbutt Wright =

American politician

Turbutt Wright (February 5, 1741 – 1783) was an American planter and political leader from Queen Anne's County, Maryland. He was a delegate for Maryland in the Continental Congress sessions of 1782.

Turbutt was born on his father's plantation of White Marsh near Centreville and lived there his entire life. He became politically active when he was elected to Maryland's General Assembly in 1773. He joined the revolutionary conventions that began to function as a government in 1775.

Wright was a delegate to Maryland's constitutional convention in 1776, and that same year was appointed to the colony's Committee of Safety for the Eastern Shore. Under the new constitution he again served in the state general assembly in 1781 and 1782. On November 28, 1781, the legislature named him as a delegate to the Continental Congress and he attended both sessions the following year.

== Speaker ==
He was also Speaker of the Maryland House of Delegates.

Wright died in 1783 at his home of White Marsh and was buried in the family plot there.

Preceded by William Bruff	Speaker of the Maryland House of Delegates; June 11, 1781 – June 14, 1781	Succeeded by William Bruff
