= Annapolis Convention (1774–1776) =

Revolutionary War government of Maryland

Annapolis Convention Assembly of Freemen
- Flag

Type
- Type: Unicameral provisional, Revolutionary legislature and government of Province of Maryland

History
- Founded: June 22, 1774
- Disbanded: January 28, 1776
- Preceded by: Maryland General Assembly (dissolved)
- Succeeded by: Maryland General Assembly (New constitution)

Leadership
- Chair: Matthew Tilghman

Meeting place
- Annapolis

Constitution
- Declaration of the Association of the Freemen of Maryland

The Annapolis Convention was an Assembly of the Counties of Maryland that functioned as the colony's provincial government from 1774 to 1776 during the early days leading up to the American Revolution. After 1775, it was officially named the Assembly of Freemen.

== Background ==
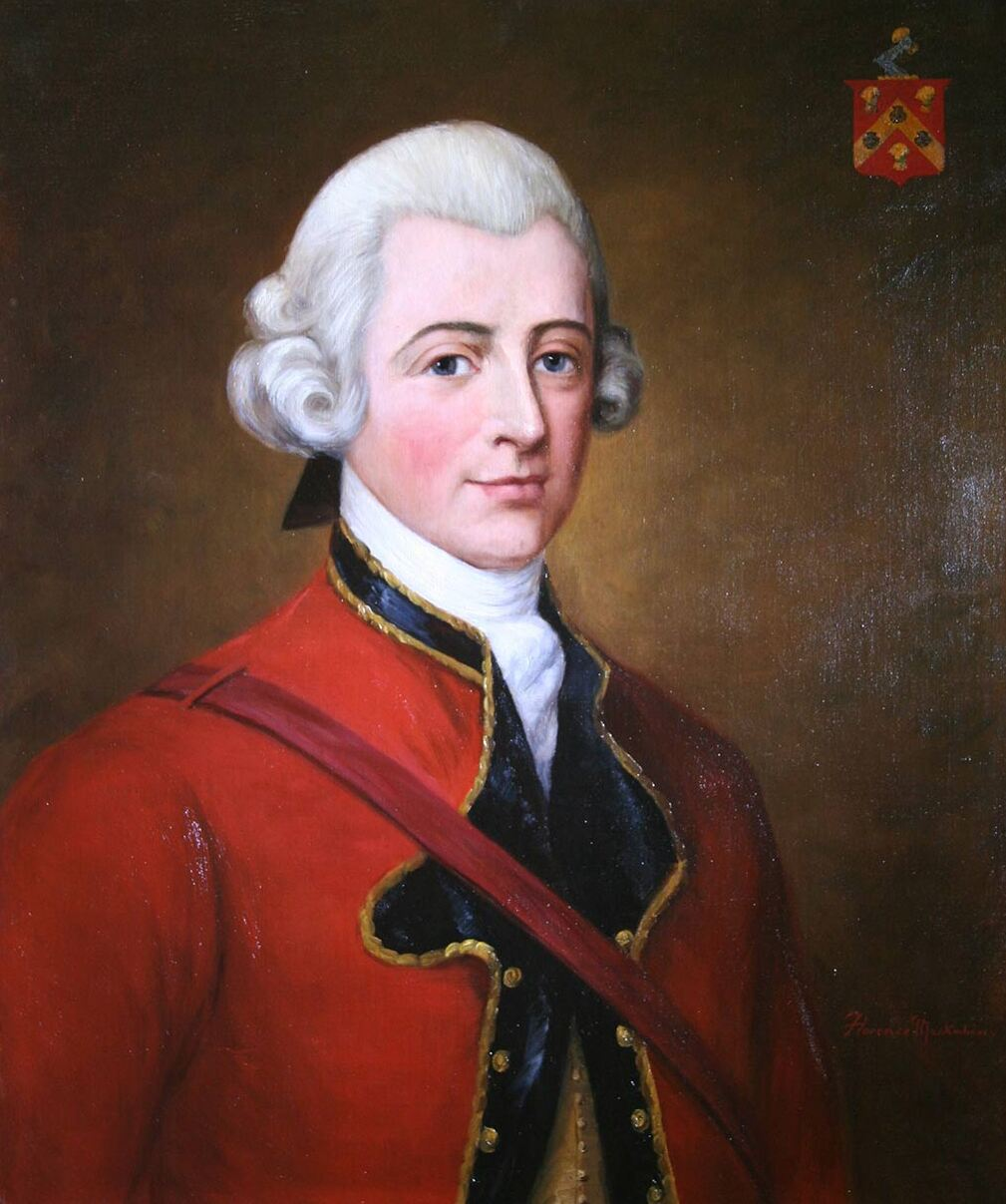
Sir Robert Eden, last colonial Governor of Maryland, who found his authority overthrown by the Annapolis Convention.

In 1774, the committees of correspondence that had sprung up throughout the colonies were being drawn to the support of Boston, as they reacted to the closing of the port and increase of the occupying military force. Massachusetts had asked for a general meeting or Continental Congress to consider joint action. To forestall any such action, the royal governor of Maryland, Robert Eden prorogued the Assembly on April 19, 1774. This was the last session of the colonial assembly ever held in Maryland. But, the assembly members agreed to meet in June at Annapolis after they went home to determine the wishes of the citizens in the counties they represented.

Over the next two and a half years, the Convention met nine times and operated as the state or colony level of government for Maryland. Throughout the period, they maintained some standing committees that continued their function between sessions.

== Sessions of the Convention ==
=== 1774 sessions ===
The first convention lasted four days, from June 22 to June 25, 1774. All sixteen counties were represented by a total of 92 members. They elected Matthew Tilghman as their chair. Within that short time, they agreed:

- That each county should have one vote.
- Passed resolutions supporting Boston, and ordered supplies sent to them.
- The Convention would continue from time to time as needed.
- A Committee of Correspondence would continue between sessions, and members were named.
- They would support non-importation agreements if the Continental Congress called for them.
- Elected delegates to the first Continental Congress.

Other sessions were held on November 21 – November 25, and December 8 – December 12.

=== 1775 sessions ===
July 26 – August 14 and December 7, 1775 – January 28, 1776

==== Declaration of the Association of the Freemen of Maryland ====
(No 13.)

ASSOCIATION of the FREEMEN of MARYLAND
July 26, 1775.

The long premeditated, and now avowed design of the British Government, to raise a revenue from the property of the colonists without their consent, on the gift, grant and disposition of the Commons of Great Britain; the arbitrary and vindictive statutes passed under color of punishing a riot, to subdue by Military force, and by famine, the Massachusetts Bay; the unlimited power assumed by parliament to alter the charter of that province, and the constitution of all the colonies, thereby destroying the essential securities of the lives, liberties and properties of the colonists; the commencement of hostilities by the ministerial forces, and the cruel prosecution of the War against the people of the Massachusetts Bay, followed by General Gage's proclamation, declaring almost the whole of the Inhabitants of the united colonies, by name or description, rebels and traitors are sufficient causes to arm a free people in defence of their liberty, and to justify resistance, no longer dictated by prudence merely, but by necessity, and leave no alternative but base submission or manly opposition to uncontrollable tyranny. The Congress chose the latter, and for the express purpose of securing and defending the united colonies, and preserving them in safety, against all attempts to carry the above-mentioned acts into execution by force of arms.

Resolved, that the said colonies be immediately put into a state of defence, and now supports, at the joint expense, an army to restrain the further violence, and repel the future attacks of a disappointed and exasperated enemy.

We therefore inhabitants of the Province of Maryland, firmly persuaded that it is necessary and justifiable to repel force by force, do approve of the opposition by Arms to the British troops, employed to enforce obedience to the late acts and statutes of the British parliament, for raising a revenue in America, and altering and changing the charter and constitution of the Massachusetts Bay, and for destroying the essential securities for the lives, liberties and properties of the subjects in the united colonies. And we do unite and associate, as one band, and firmly and solemnly engage and pledge ourselves to each other, and to America, that we will to the utmost of our power, promote and support the present opposition, carrying on, as well by Arms, as by the continental association, restraining our commerce.

And as in these times of public danger, and until a reconciliation with Great Britain, on constitutional principles is effected (an event we most ardently wish may soon take place) the energy of government may be greatly impaired, so that even zeal unrestrained, may be productive of anarchy and confusion; We do in like manner unite, associate, and solemnly engage in maintenance of good order, and the public peace, to support the civil power in the due execution of the laws, so far as may be consistent with the present plan of opposition; and to defend with our utmost power all persons from every species of outrage to themselves or their property, and to prevent any punishment, from being inflicted on any offenders, other than such, as shall be adjudged by the civil magistrate, continental congress, our convention, council of safety, or committees of observation.

Mat. Tilghman
John Reeder Jun^{r}	Ben^{n} Hall	H. Griffith	Bene^{ct} Edw^{d} Hall
Rich^{d} Barnes	John Contee	Th. Sprigg Wootton	Th^{s} Bond
Jere^{h} Jordan	W. Bowie	Richd. Brooke	Rich^{d} Dallam
Jn. A. Thomas	O. Sprigg	John Hanson J^{r}	Ignatius Wheeler Jr.
W. Smallwood	Jos. Beall	Joseph Chapline	Wm. Webb
Dan^{l} Jenifer	Thos Gantt Junior	Thos. Cramphin J^{r}	John Veazey Jun^{r}
R. Hooe	Walter Bowie	Upton Sheredine	Jno. D. Thompson
J. H. Stone	David Crauford	Benj. Nicholson	John Cox
Will. Harrison	Stephen West	Wm. Buchanan	Peter Lawson
S. Hanson of Sam.	Tho. Sim Lee	J. To^{y} Chase	Nat. Ramsey
Jno. Dent	J. Rogers	John Cradock	William Currer
Edwd Gantt	Samuel Chase	Thomas Harrison	Cha^{s} Rumsey
Samuel Chew	Th. Johnson Jun^{r}	Darby Lux	W. Ringgold Jun^{r}
Edw^{d} Reynolds	Brice B. Worthington	John Moale	Tho^{s} Smyth
Benj. Mackall 4th	Rezin Hammond	Rob^{t} Alexander	Josh^{h} Earle
Josia Beall	J. Hall	Cha^{s} Ridgely son of W^{m}	Th. B. Hands
Robt. Tyler	William Paca	Saml. Handy	Tho^{s} Ringgold
Rho^{s} Contee	Matthias Hammond	Sadok Purnell	J. Nicholson Jr.
Joseph Sim	Chas. Carroll	Wm. Morris
Turbutt Wright	Chas. Carroll of Carrollton	Tho^{s} Stone
Jas. Tilghman of Annapolis	Ephraim Howard of H^{y}
Th. Wright	Thomas Dorsey
Ja^{s} Hollyday	Robert Goldsborough
R^{d} Earle	Henry Hooper
Sol^{n} Wright	James Murray
Ja^{s} Loyd Chamberlaine	Tho^{s} Ennalls
Nic. Thomas	Nath. Potter
Edw^{d} Lloyd	Will, Richardson
Peregrine Tilghman	Rich^{d} Mason
W^{m} Hindman	Joshua Clark
R. Tilghman Jun.	Peter Adams
Ram^{s} Benson	John Stevens
F. Baker	W^{m} Hopper
	Henry Dickinson
	W^{m} Waters
	W^{m} Rolleston
	George Dashiell
	John Waters
	Gustavus Scott

===== Note by Maryland Historical Society =====
The original engagement of the Associators, preserved under glass at Annapolis, consists of two pieces, apparently torn apart, and pasted down on card-board. On our p. 67 the order of names and arrangement of columns have been preserved, though not the spacing; and the division of the pieces falls just below the names of Joseph Sim, Thomas Dorsey, and Charles Ridgely.

On comparing these signatures with the Journal, 29 names will be found to be missing, viz: Philip Richard Fendall I (1734–1805) of Charles Co.; Alexander Somerville of Calvert; George Lee and D^{r} Richard Brooke of Prince George's; Thomas Tillard and John Dorsey of Anne Arundel; Walter Tolly, James Gittings, and Charles Ridgely of John, of Baltimore; Charles Beatty, Baker Johnson, Jacob Funk, Samuel Beall, and Wm. Deakins Jr., of Frederick; Samuel Durham, Saml. Ashmead, John Beall Howard, Francis Holland, Benjamin Rumsey, and James M^{c}Comas, of Harford; Joseph Gilpin and William Rumsey, of Cecil; Richard Lloyd of Kent; John Wallace and John Brown, of Queen Anne's; Robert Harrison of Dorchester; Benson Stainton of Caroline; Josiah Polk of Somerset; Peter Chaille of Worcester.

Now when we note that amongst these 29 were some of the most active and assiduous members of the Convention, and that 21 of them had, as the Journal shows, no leave of absence, it is impossible to resist the conclusion that a portion of the document has been lost. It will be observed that the arrangement is generally by counties, and the break in the paper comes between Prince George's and Queen Anne's, between Ann Arundel and Dorchester, and between Baltimore and Worcester; a fact which confirms the editor's belief that a piece has fallen out between the upper and lower portions as now joined.

=== 1776 sessions ===
May 8 – May 25, June 21 – July 6, and August 14 – November 11

The eighth session decided that the continuation of an ad hoc government by the convention was not a good mechanism for all the concerns of the province. A more permanent and structured government was needed. So, on July 3, 1776, they resolved that a new convention be elected that would be responsible for drawing up their first state constitution, one that did not refer to parliament or the king, but would be a government "...of the people only." After they set dates and prepared notices to the counties they adjourned. On August 1 all freemen with property elected delegates for the last convention.

The ninth and last convention was also known as the Constitutional Convention of 1776. They drafted a constitution, and when they adjourned on November 11, they would not meet again. The Conventions were replaced by the new state government.

== See also ==
- History of Maryland
- History of Maryland in the American Revolution
- List of delegates to the Maryland Constitutional Convention (1776)
