= Maryland in the American Revolution =

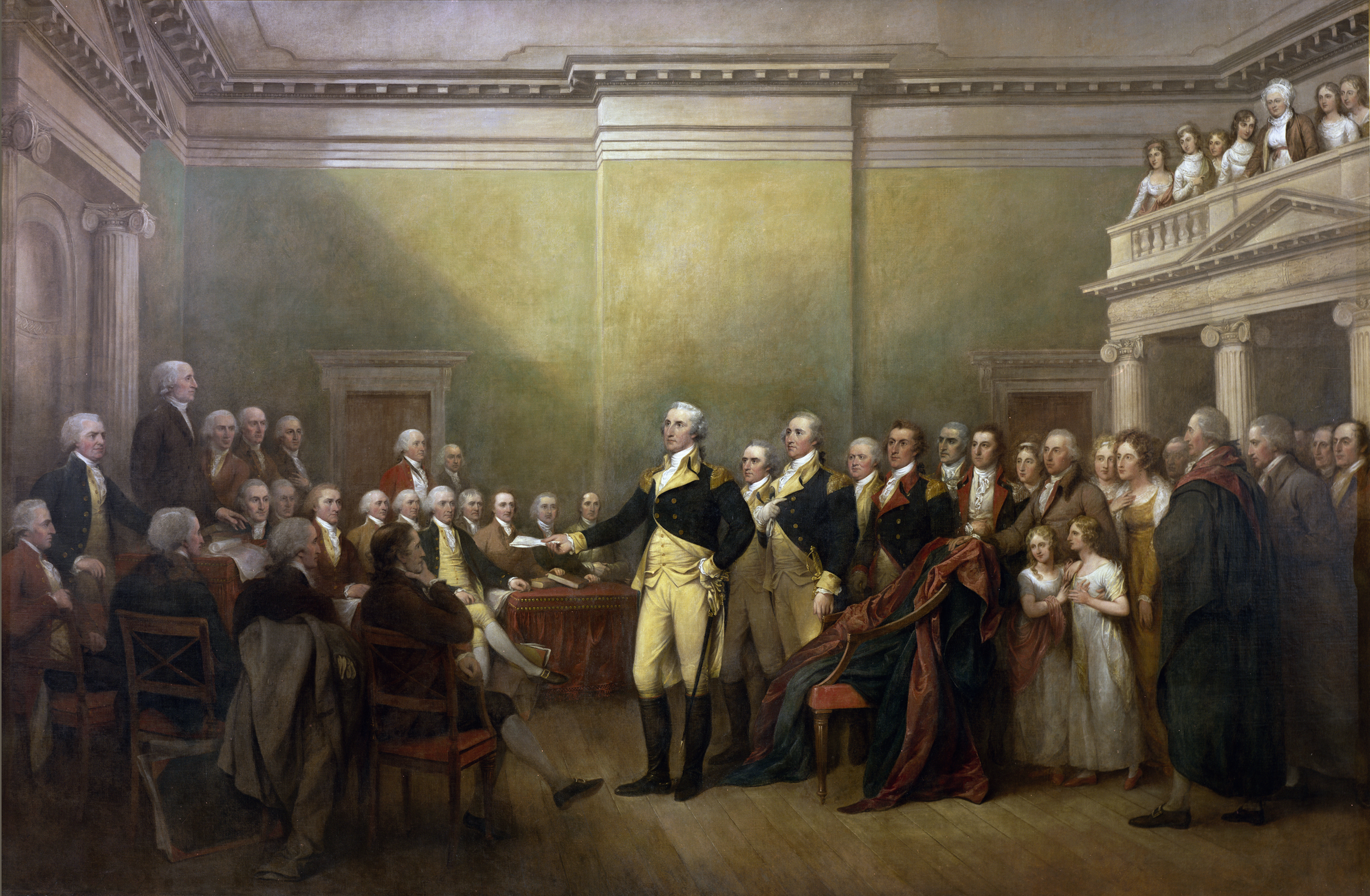
Painting by John Trumbull of General George Washington Resigning His Commission as commander-in-chief of the Continental Army, at the Maryland State House on State Circle in Annapolis on December 23, 1783, after the end of the Revolutionary War and the ratification of the Treaty of Paris.

Then Province of Maryland had been a British / English colony since 1632, when Sir George Calvert, first Baron of Baltimore and Lord Baltimore (1579–1632), received a charter and grant from King Charles I of England and first created a haven for English Roman Catholics in the New World, with his son, Cecilius Calvert (1605–1675), the second Lord Baltimore equipping and sending over the first colonists to the Chesapeake Bay region in March 1634. The first signs of rebellion against the mother country occurred in 1765, when the tax collector Zachariah Hood was injured while landing at the second provincial capital of Annapolis docks, arguably the first violent resistance to British taxation in the colonies. After a decade of bitter argument and internal discord, Maryland declared itself a sovereign state in 1776. The province was one of the Thirteen Colonies of British America to declare independence from Great Britain and joined the others in signing a collective Declaration of Independence that summer in the Second Continental Congress in nearby Philadelphia. Samuel Chase, William Paca, Thomas Stone, and Charles Carroll of Carrollton signed on Maryland's behalf.

Although no major battles of the American Revolutionary War (1775–1783) occurred in Maryland itself, (although the British Royal Navy fleet passed through and up the Bay to land troops at the "Head of Elk"), to attack the colonies' capital city, this did not prevent the state's soldiers from distinguishing themselves through their service. General George Washington counted the "Maryland Line" regiment who fought in the Continental Army especially the famed "Maryland 400" during the Battle of Brooklyn in August 1776, outside New York Town as among his finest soldiers, and Maryland is still known as "The Old Line State" today.

During the war itself, Baltimore Town served as the temporary capital of the colonies when the Second Continental Congress met there during December 1776 to February 1777, after Philadelphia had been threatened with occupation by the British "Redcoats". Towards the end of the struggle, from November 26, 1783, to June 3, 1784, the state's capital Annapolis, briefly served as the capital of the fledgling confederation government (1781–1789) of the United States of America, and it was in the Old Senate Chamber of the Maryland State House on State Circle in Annapolis that General George Washington famously resigned his commission as commander in chief of the Continental Army on December 23, 1783. It was also there that the Treaty of Paris, which ended the Revolutionary War, was ratified by the Confederation Congress on January 14, 1784.

Like other states, Maryland was bitterly divided by the war; many Loyalists refused to join the Revolution, and saw their lands and estates confiscated as a consequence. The Barons Baltimore, who before the war had exercised almost feudal power in Maryland, were among the biggest losers. Almost the entire political elite of the province was overthrown, replaced by an entirely new political class, loyal to a new national political structure.

== Background ==
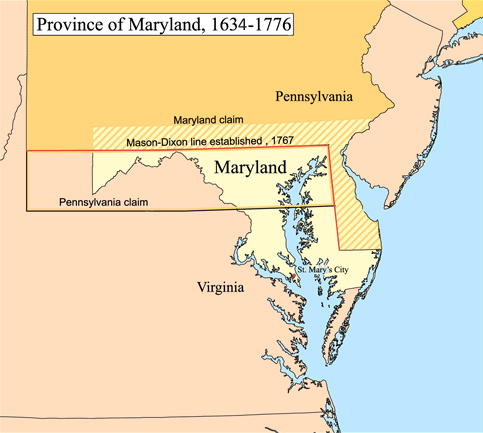
Map of the Maryland colony, 1632–1776

The State of Maryland began as the Province of Maryland, an English settlement in North America founded in 1632 as a proprietary colony. George Calvert, 1st Baron Baltimore (1580–1632), wished to create a haven for his fellow English Catholics in the New World. After founding a colony in the Newfoundland called "Avalon", he convinced the King to grant him a second territory in more southern temperate climes. When George Calvert died in 1632 the grant was transferred to his eldest son Cecil.

The ship The Ark and The Dove sent by Cecil Calvert, 2nd Baron Baltimore (1605–1675), landed on March 25, 1634, at Blackistone Island, thereafter known as St. Clement's Island. Here at St. Clement's Island, led by Father Andrew White, they raised a large cross, and held a mass. In April 1634, Lord Baltimore's younger brother Leonard Calvert, first colonial governor, made a settlement at what was named "St. Mary's City".

=== Religious strife ===
Although Maryland was an early pioneer of religious toleration in the British colonies, religious strife among Anglicans, Puritans, Roman Catholics, and Quakers was common in the early years, and in 1654 Puritan rebels briefly seized control of the province.

The Glorious Revolution of 1688 saw King James II, of the dynasty of the House of Stuart, replaced with his Protestant daughter Mary and her husband William of Orange. In British North America, John Coode led a rebellion, known as the "Protestant Revolution", that expelled the Catholic Lords Baltimore from power and banned Roman Catholic worship in the Province. In 1692 King William III installed a crown-appointed governor.

=== Economy ===
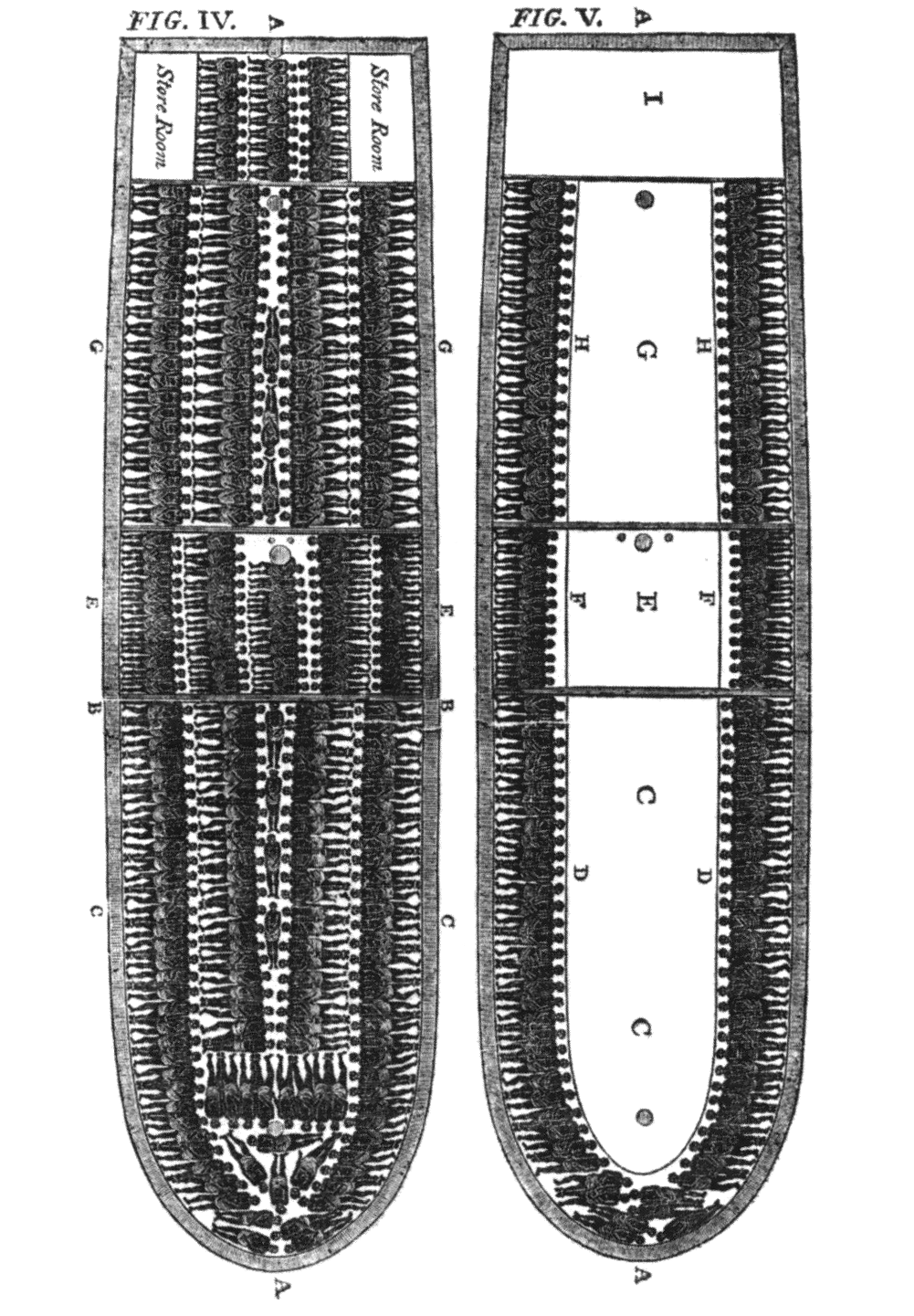
Diagram of a slave ship from the Atlantic slave trade. From an Abstract of Evidence delivered before a select committee of the House of Commons of Great Britain in 1790 and 1791.

Despite early competition with the colony of Virginia to its south, the Province of Maryland developed along lines very similar to those of Virginia. Its early settlements and populations centers tended to cluster around the rivers and other waterways that empty into the Chesapeake Bay. Like Virginia, Maryland's economy quickly became centered around the farming of tobacco for sale in Europe. The need for cheap labor to help with the growth of tobacco, and later with the mixed farming economy that developed when tobacco prices collapsed, led to a rapid expansion of indentured servitude and, later, forcible immigration and enslavement of Africans.

In the later colonial period, the southern and eastern portions of the Province continued in their tobacco economy, heavily dependent on slave labor, but as the revolution approached, northern and central Maryland increasingly became centers of wheat production. This helped drive the expansion of interior farming towns like Frederick and Maryland's major port city of Baltimore.

== Economic tensions ==
Among the many tensions between Maryland and the mother country were economic problems, focused around the sale of Maryland's principal cash crop, tobacco. A handful of Glasgow tobacco merchants increasingly dominated the tobacco trade between Britain and her colonies, manipulating prices and causing great distress among Maryland and Virginia planters, who by the time of the outbreak of war had accumulated debts of around £1,000,000, a huge sum at the time. These debts, as much as the taxation imposed by Westminster, were among the colonists' most bitter grievances.

Prior to 1740, Glasgow merchants were responsible for the import of less than 10% of America's tobacco crop, but by the 1750s a handful of Glasgow Tobacco Lords handled more of the trade than the rest of Britain's ports combined. Heavily capitalised, and taking great personal risks, these men made immense fortunes from the "Clockwork Operation" of fast ships coupled with ruthless dealmaking and the manipulation of credit. Maryland planters were offered easy credit by the Glaswegian merchants, enabling them to buy European consumer goods and other luxuries before harvest time gave them the ready cash to do so. But, when the time came to sell the crop, the indebted growers found themselves forced by the canny traders to accept low prices for their harvest simply in order to stave off bankruptcy.

In neighbouring Virginia, tobacco planters experienced similar problems. At his Mount Vernon plantation, future President of the United States George Washington saw his liabilities swell to nearly £2000 by the late 1760s. Thomas Jefferson, on the verge of losing his own farm, accused British merchants of unfairly depressing tobacco prices and forcing Virginia farmers to take on unsustainable debt loads. In 1786, he remarked:

A powerful engine for this [mercantile profiting] was the giving of good prices and credit to the planter till they got him more immersed in debt than he could pay without selling lands or slaves. They then reduced the prices given for his tobacco so that ... they never permitted him to clear off his debt.

Many Marylanders sought to use the opportunity posed by war to repudiate their debts. One of the "Resolves" later adopted by the citizens of Annapolis on May 25, 1774, would read as follows:

Resolved, that it is the opinion of the meeting, that the gentlemen of the law of this province bring no suit for the recovery of any debt, due from any inhabitant of this province to any inhabitant of Great Britain, until the said act [The Stamp Act] be repealed

After the war, few of the enormous debts owed by the colonists would never be repaid.

There were also serious tensions between the colonists and the British over land, especially after the Crown effectively confirmed Indian land rights in 1763. Washington himself was appalled by this decision to protect native property rights, writing to his future partner William Crawford in 1767 that he:

could never look upon that Proclamation in any other light ... than as a temporary expedient to quiet the minds of the Indians. It must fall, of course, in a few years, especially when those Indians consent to our occupying their lands.

== Tax protests ==
In 1764 Britain imposed a tax on sugar, the first of many ultimately unsuccessful attempts to make her North American subjects bear a portion of the cost of the recent French and Indian War. The first stirrings of revolution in Maryland came in the Fall of 1765, when the speaker of the Lower House of the Maryland General Assembly received a number of letters from Massachusetts, one proposing a meeting of delegates from all the colonies, others objecting to British taxation without consent and proposing that Marylanders should be "free of any impositions, but such as they consent to by themselves or their representatives".

Meanwhile, an Annapolis merchant by the name of Zachariah Hood, charged by the British with the task of collecting the new stamp duty, was injured at the dock on his return to Maryland by an angry crowd in what has been called the "first successful, forcible resistance in America to King George's authority". Shunned by his friends and fearful of his life, Hood, at the invitation of governor Cadwallader Colden of New York, fled Maryland for New York and took refuge at Fort George. Governor Sharpe reported in September 1765 that he was "very apprehensive that if the stamp paper was to arrive here and be landed at this time it would not be in my power to preserve it from being burnt".

=== Charles Carroll of Carrollton ===
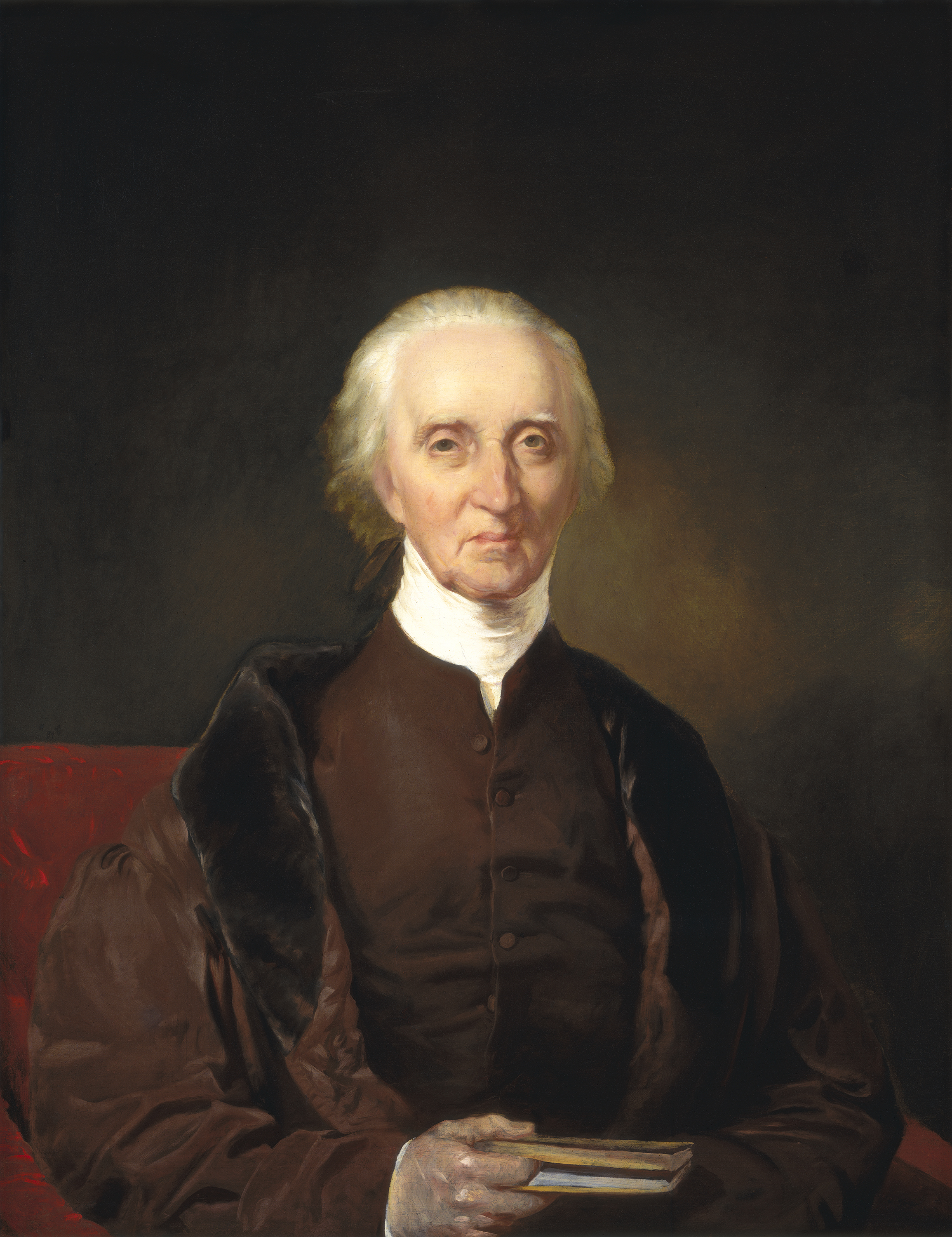
Maryland planter Charles Carroll of Carrollton was the only Roman Catholic to sign the Declaration of Independence.

One of the early voices for independence in Maryland was the wealthy Roman Catholic planter Charles Carroll of Carrollton. In 1772 he engaged in a debate conducted through anonymous newspaper letters and maintained the right of the colonies to control their own taxation. As a Roman Catholic, he was barred from entering politics, from practicing law, and from voting.

In the early 1770s, Carroll appears to have begun to embrace the idea that only violence could break the impasse with Great Britain. According to legend, Carroll and Samuel Chase (who would also later sign the Declaration of Independence on Maryland's behalf) had the following exchange:

Chase: "We have the better of our opponents; we have completely written them down."
Carroll: "And do you think that writing will settle the question between us?"
Chase: "To be sure, what else can we resort to?"
Carroll: "The bayonet. Our arguments will only raise the feelings of the people to that pitch, when open war will be looked to as the arbiter of the dispute".

Writing in the Maryland Gazette under the pseudonym "First Citizen," Carroll became a prominent spokesman against the governor's proclamation increasing legal fees to state officers and Protestant clergy. Carroll also served on various Committees of Correspondence, promoting independence.

From 1774 to 1776, Carroll was a member of the Annapolis Convention. He was commissioned with Benjamin Franklin, Samuel Chase and his cousin John Carroll in February 1774 to seek aid from Canada. He was a member of Annapolis' first Committee of Safety in 1775. In early 1776, while not yet a member, the Congress sent him on a mission to Canada. When Maryland decided to support the open revolution, he was elected to the Continental Congress on July 4, 1776, and remained a delegate until 1778. He arrived too late to vote in favor of it, but was able to sign the Declaration of Independence.

It is possible that the First Amendment to the United States Constitution - guaranteeing freedom of religion - was written in appreciation for Carroll's considerable financial support during the Revolutionary War. Carroll was the only Roman Catholic to sign the Declaration of Independence, and until his death in 1832 he was its last living signatory.

=== Samuel Chase ===
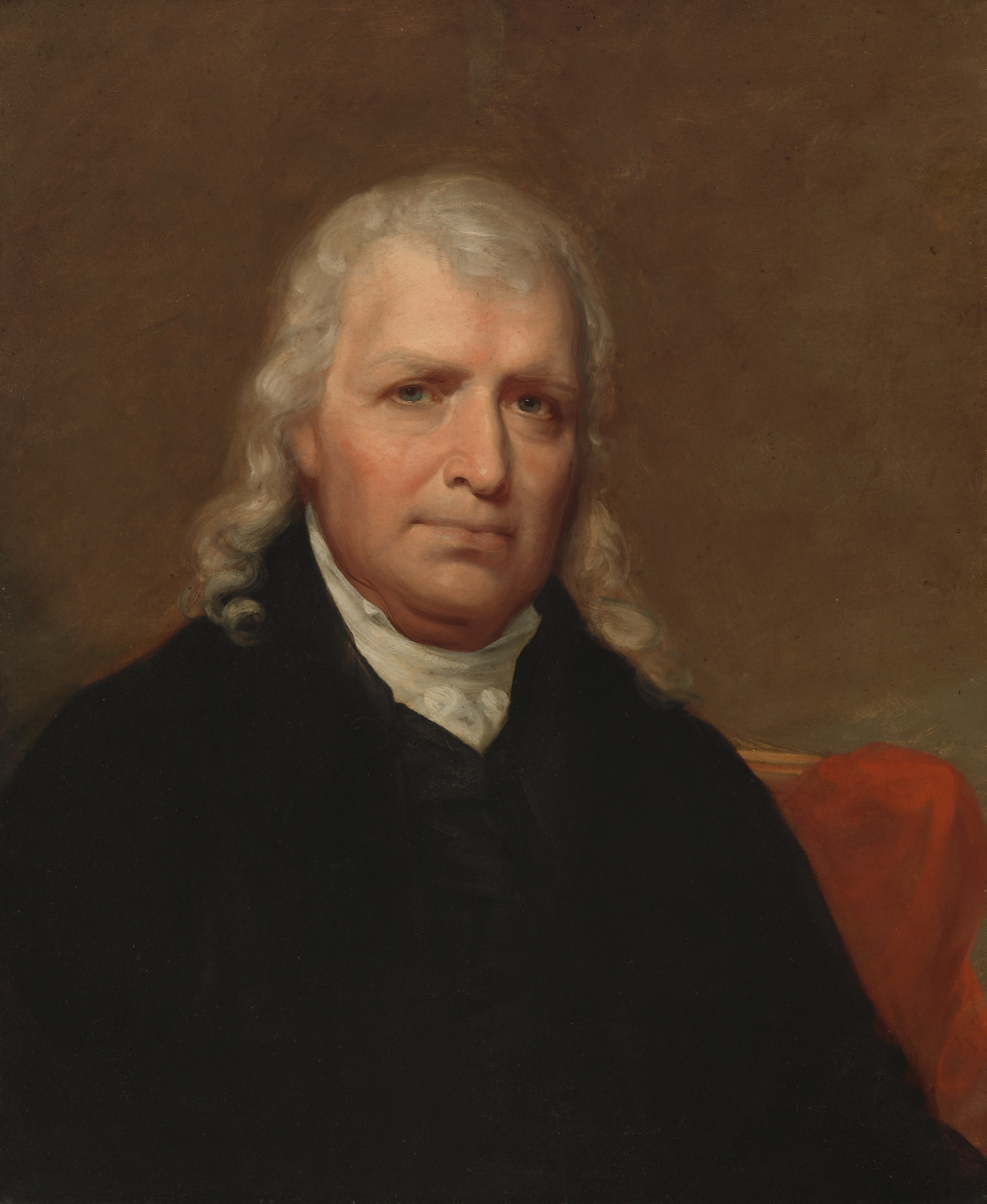
Samuel Chase, firebrand revolutionary and later a justice of the United States Supreme Court.

Samuel Chase (1741–1811), was a "firebrand" states-righter and revolutionary, and was a signatory to the United States Declaration of Independence as a representative of Maryland. He co-founded Anne Arundel County's Sons of Liberty chapter with his close friend William Paca, and led opposition to the 1765 Stamp Act. Later he became an Associate Justice of the United States Supreme Court.

== Loyalist opposition ==
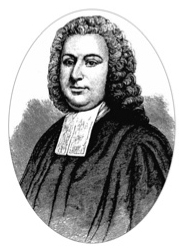
Daniel Dulaney the Younger proposed "a legal, orderly, and prudent resentment" rather than war

Public opinion in Maryland before the war was bitterly divided; many Marylanders either actively supported the Crown or were unwilling to countenance violence as a means of redress. In 1766, Samuel Chase became embroiled in a war of words with a number of Loyalist members of the Maryland political establishment in Annapolis. In an open letter dated July 18, 1766, Chase attacked Walter Dulany, George Steuart (1700–1784), John Brice (1705–1766), Michael MacNamara and others for publishing an article in the Maryland Gazette Extraordinary of June 19, 1766, in which Chase was accused of being: "a busy, reckless incendiary, a ringleader of mobs, a foul-mouthed and inflaming son of discord and faction, a common disturber of the public tranquility". In his response, Chase accused Steuart and the others of "vanity ... pride and arrogance", and of being brought to power by "proprietary influence, court favour, and the wealth and influence of the tools and favourites who infest this city." Such disputes would become increasingly bitter as war approached.

One prominent Loyalist was Daniel Dulaney the Younger, former Lord Mayor of Annapolis, and an influential lawyer in the period immediately before the Revolution. Dulany was a noted opposer of the Stamp Act 1765, and wrote the noted pamphlet Considerations on the Propriety of Imposing Taxes in the British Colonies which argued against taxation without representation. The pamphlet has been described as "the ablest effort of this kind produced in America". In the pamphlet, Dulany summarized his position as follows: "There may be a time when redress may not be obtained. Till then, I shall recommend a legal, orderly, and prudent resentment". Eventually, as war became inevitable, Dulany (like many others) found his essentially moderate position untenable and he found himself forced to choose sides. Dulany was not able to rebel against the Crown he and his family had served so long. He believed that protest rather than force should furnish the solution to America's problems, and that legal process, logic, and the "prudent" exercise of "agreements" would eventually prevail upon the British to concede the colonists' demands.

== Coming of Revolution ==
In 1774, committees of correspondence sprung up throughout the colonies, offering support to Boston, Massachusetts, after the British closed the port and increased the occupying military force. Massachusetts had asked for a general meeting or Continental Congress to consider joint action by all the colonies. To forestall any such action, the royal governor of Maryland, Sir Robert Eden prorogued the Maryland colonial assembly on April 19, 1774. This was the last session of the colonial assembly ever held in Maryland.

=== Annapolis Tea party ===
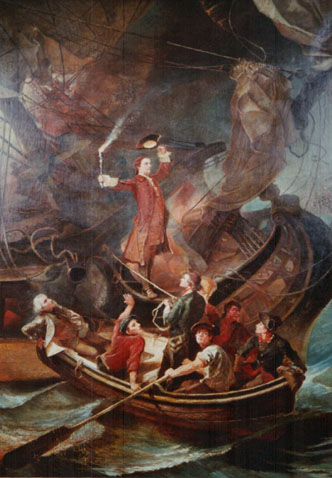
Painting by Francis Blackwell Mayer, 1896, depicting the burning of the Peggy Stewart at the Annapolis Tea Party, October 19, 1774.

On October 19, 1774, the Peggy Stewart, a Maryland cargo vessel, was set alight and burned by an angry mob in Annapolis, punishing the ship's captain for contravening the boycott on tea imports and mimicking the events of the more famous Boston Tea Party in December 1773. This event has since become known as the "Annapolis Tea Party".

In May 1774, according to local legend, the Chestertown Tea Party took place in Chestertown, Maryland, during which Maryland patriots boarded the brigantine Geddes in broad daylight and threw its cargo of tea into the Chester River, as a protest against taxes imposed by the British Tea Act. The event is still celebrated to this day each Memorial Day weekend with a festival and historic re-enactment known as the Chestertown Tea Party Festival.

Governor Eden returned to Maryland from England shortly after the Peggy Stewart was burned. On December 30, 1774, he wrote:

The spirit of resistance against the Tea Act, or any mode of internal taxation, is as strong and universal here as ever. I firmly believe that they will undergo any hardship sooner than acknowledge a right in the British Parliament in that particular, and will persevere in their non-importation and non-exportation experiments, in spite of every inconvenience that they must consequently be exposed to, and the total loss of their trade.

Despite such protests, and a growing sense that war was inevitable, Maryland still held back from full independence from Great Britain, and gave instructions to that effect to its delegates to the First Continental Congress which met in Philadelphia, Pennsylvania in September 1774.

=== Assembly of Freemen ===
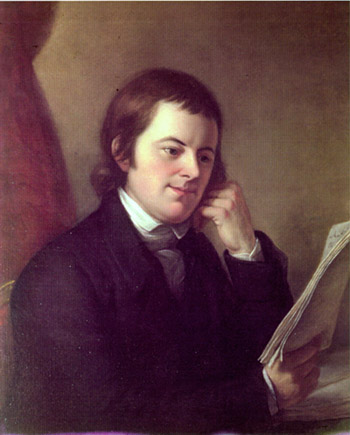
Thomas Johnson, Maryland's first elected governor under its 1776 Constitution.

During this initial phase of the Revolutionary period, Maryland was governed by the Assembly of Freemen, an Assembly of the state's counties. The first convention lasted four days, from June 22 to June 25, 1774. All sixteen counties then existing were represented by a total of 92 members; Matthew Tilghman was elected chairman.

The eighth session decided that the continuation of an ad-hoc government by the convention was not a good mechanism for all the concerns of the province. A more permanent and structured government was needed. So, on July 3, 1776, they resolved that a new convention be elected that would be responsible for drawing up their first state constitution, one that did not refer to parliament or the king, but would be a government "...of the people only." After they set dates and prepared notices to the counties they adjourned. On August 1, all freemen with property elected delegates for the last convention. The ninth and last convention was also known as the Constitutional Convention of 1776. They drafted a constitution, and when they adjourned on November 11, they would not meet again. The Conventions were replaced by the new state government which the Maryland Constitution of 1776 had established. Thomas Johnson became the state's first elected governor.

=== Declaration of Independence ===
Maryland declared independence from Britain in 1776, with Samuel Chase, William Paca, Thomas Stone, and Charles Carroll of Carrollton signing the Declaration of Independence for the colony.

In 1777, all Maryland voters were required to take the Oath of Fidelity and Support. This was an oath swearing allegiance to the state of Maryland and denying allegiance and obedience to Great Britain. As enacted by the Maryland General Assembly in 1777, all persons holding any office of profit or trust, including attorneys at law, and all voters were required to take the oath no later than March 1, 1778. It was signed by 3,136 residents of Montgomery and Washington counties.

On March 1, 1781, the Articles of Confederation took effect with Maryland's ratification. The articles had initially been submitted to the states on November 17, 1777, but the ratification process dragged on for several years, stalled by an interstate quarrel over claims to uncolonized land in the west. Maryland was the last hold-out; it refused to ratify until Virginia and New York agreed to rescind their claims to lands in what became the Northwest Territory.

Maryland would later accept the United States Constitution more readily, ratifying it on April 28, 1788.

== Revolutionary War ==
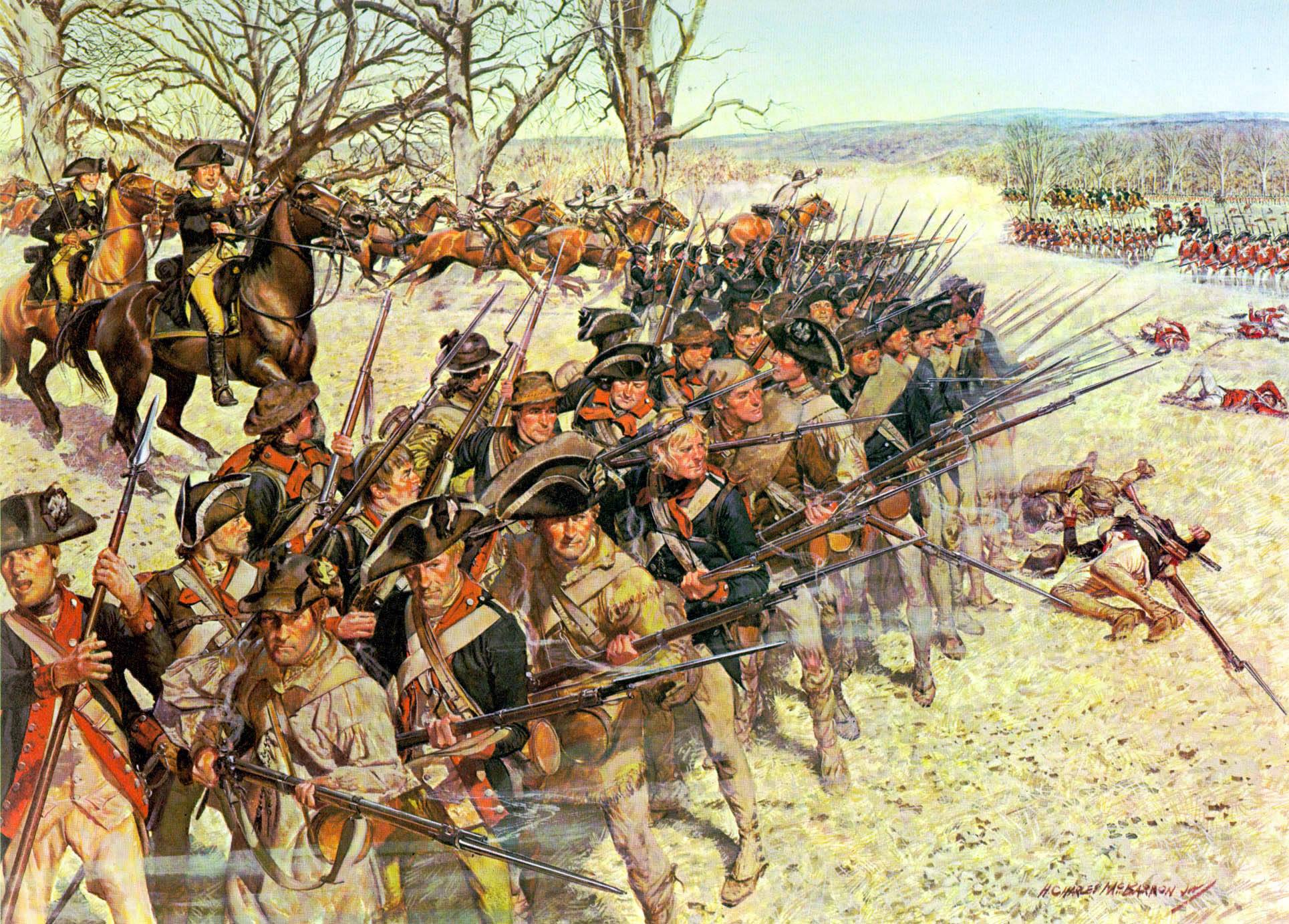
The 1st Maryland Regiment holds the line at the Battle of Guilford Courthouse, March 15, 1781.

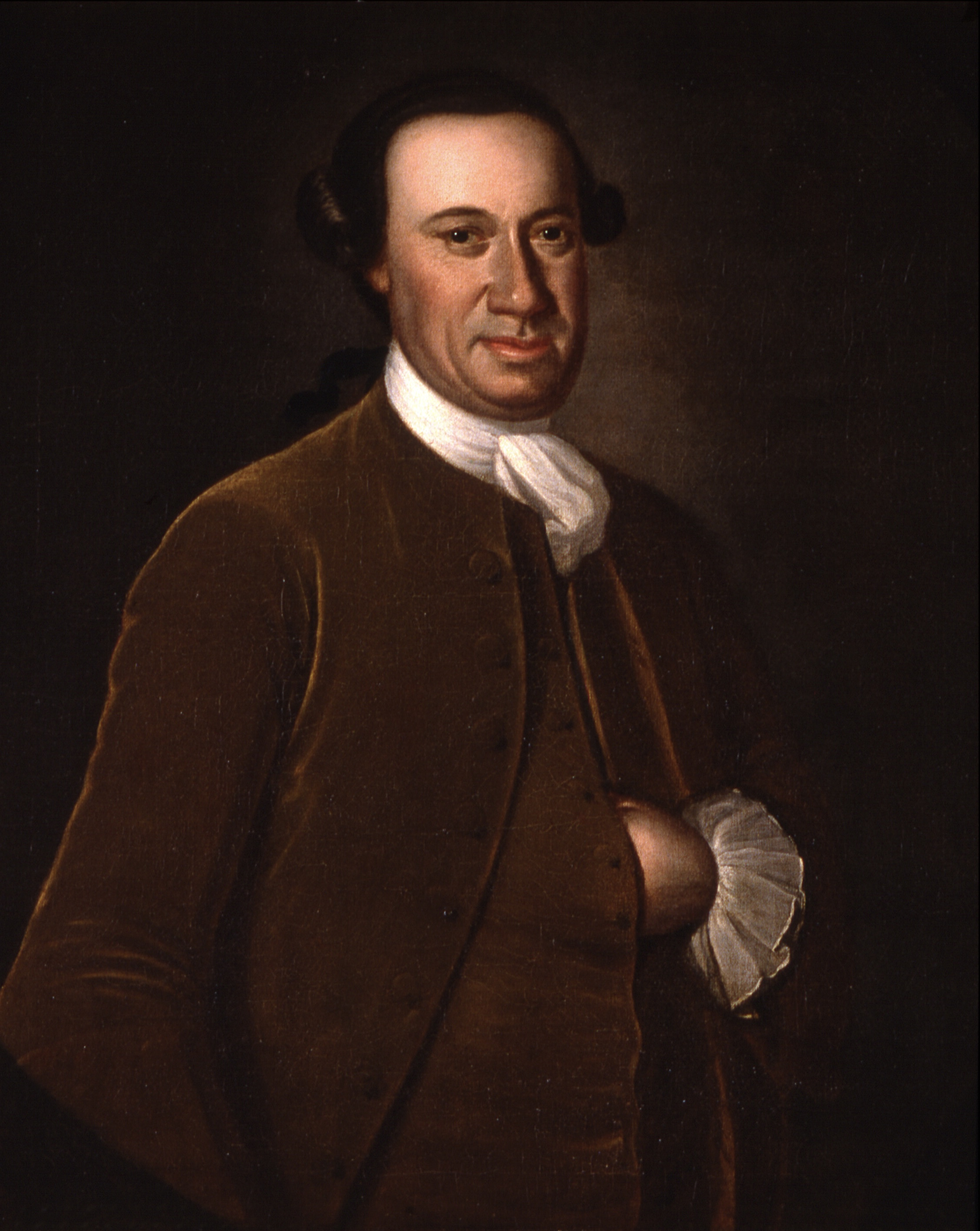
Marylander John Hanson (1721–1783) was the first person to serve a full term as President of the Continental Congress under the Articles of Confederation.

Although no major Battles of the American Revolutionary War occurred in Maryland, this did not prevent the state's soldiers from distinguishing themselves through their service. General George Washington was impressed with the Maryland regulars (the "Maryland Line") who fought in the Continental Army and, according to one tradition, this led him to bestow the name "Old Line State" on Maryland. Today, the Old Line State is one of Maryland's two official nicknames.

The state also filled other roles during the war. For instance, the Continental Congress met briefly in Baltimore from December 20, 1776, through March 4, 1777. Baltimore served as the temporary capital of the colonies when the Second Continental Congress met there during December 1776 to February 1777, when Philadelphia was threatened by the British, meeting at the old "Henry Fite House", a substantial three-and-half story brick structure on the western edge of town (beyond the possible cannon range of any British Royal Navy ships that might try to force a passage upstream on the Patapsco River from the Chesapeake Bay to the Harbor), The building was later a tavern/hotel, then named "Congress Hall" after the sessions held there at Market Street (previously Long Street and later West Baltimore Street) and South Sharp-and later North Liberty Street.

Marylander John Hanson served as President of the Continental Congress from 1781 to 1782. Hanson was the first person to serve a full term as President of the Congress under the Articles of Confederation. From November 26, 1783, to June 3, 1784, Annapolis served as the United States capital and the Confederation Congress met in the Maryland State House. (Annapolis was a candidate to become the new nation's permanent capital before Washington, D.C. was built). It was in the old senate chamber that George Washington resigned his commission as commander in chief of the Continental Army on December 23, 1783. It was also there that the Treaty of Paris, which ended the Revolutionary War, was ratified by Congress on January 14, 1784.

=== Loyalists and the war ===
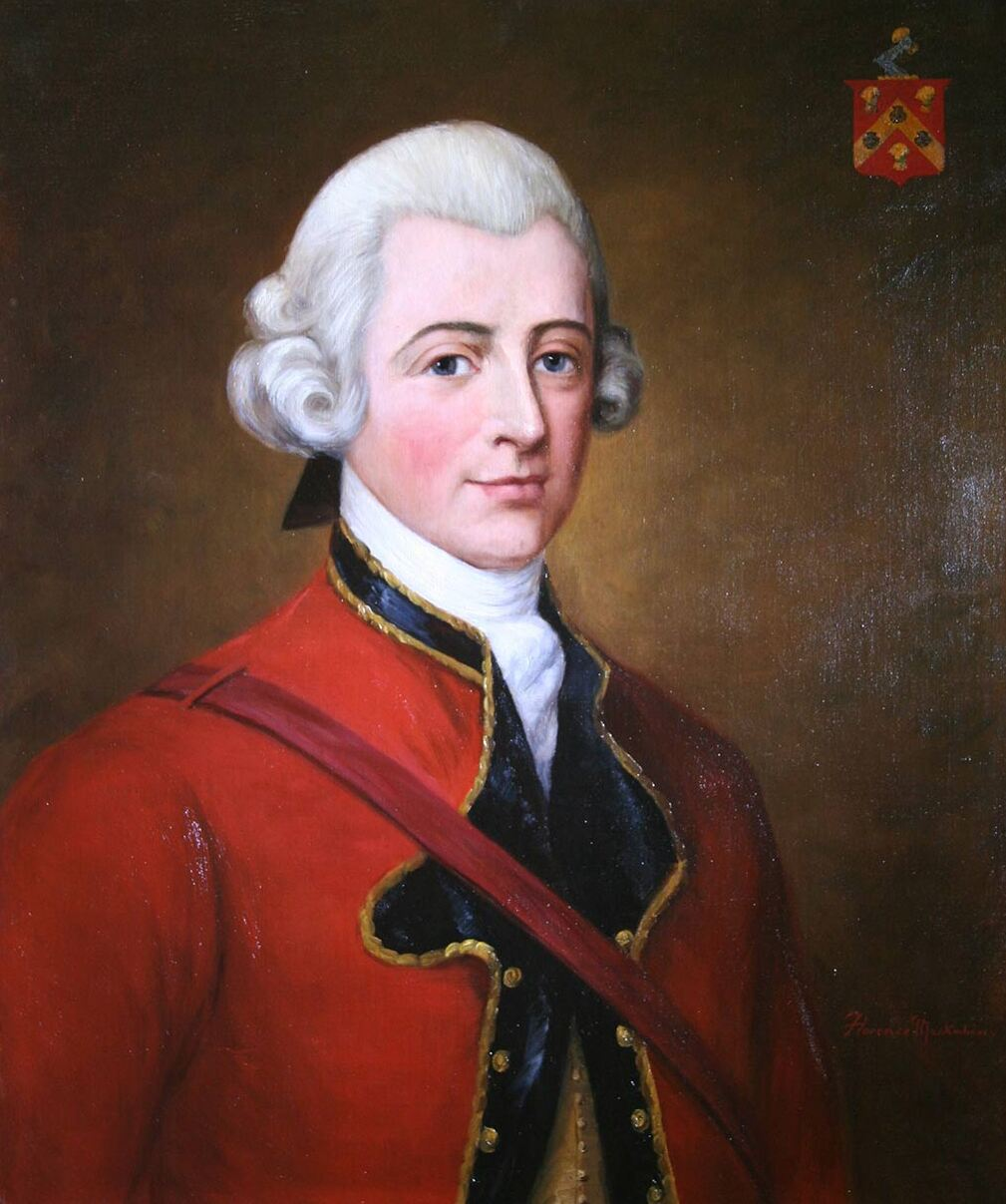
Sir Robert Eden, last colonial Governor of Maryland

During the war many Marylanders, such as Benedict Swingate Calvert, illegitimate son of the ruling Calvert family and a Judge of the Land Office, remained Loyal to the British Crown, and suffered the consequences. Calvert found himself on the losing side of the Revolutionary War, which would effectively end his political career. The Annapolis Convention of 1774 to 1776 would see the old Maryland elite overthrown. Men like Calvert, Governor Eden and George Steuart were all to lose their political power, and in many cases their land and wealth.

On May 13, 1777 Benedict Swingate Calvert was forced to resign his position as Judge of the Land Office, and, as the conflict grew, he became fearful of his family's safety, writing in late 1777 that his family "has been made so uneasy by these frequent outrages" that he wished to "remove my family and property where I can get protection".

Calvert did not leave Maryland, nor did he involve himself in the fighting, though he did on occasion supply the Continental Army with food and provisions. After the war, he had to pay triple taxes as did other Loyalists, but he was never forced to sign the loyalty oath and his lands and property remained unconfiscated.

=== African Americans and the war ===
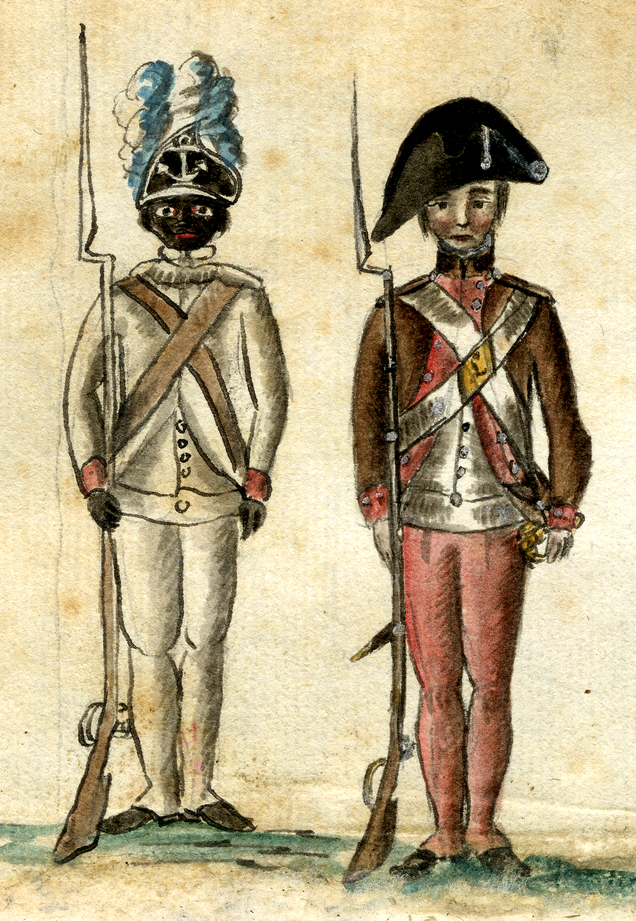
1st Rhode Island Regiment soldier (left)

The principal cause of the American Revolution was liberty, but only on behalf of white men, and certainly not slaves. The British, desperately short of manpower, sought to enlist African American soldiers to fight on behalf of the Crown, promising them liberty in exchange. As a result of the looming crisis in 1775 the Royal Governor of Virginia, Lord Dunmore, issued a proclamation that promised freedom to servants and slaves who were able to bear arms and join his Loyalist Ethiopian Regiment:

... I do require every Person capable of bearing Arms, to resort to His MAJESTY'S STANDARD, or be looked upon as Traitors to His MAJESTY'S Crown and Government, and thereby become liable to the Penalty the Law inflicts upon such Offenses; such as forfeiture of Life, confiscation of Lands, &. &. And I do hereby further declare all indented Servants, Negroes, or others, (appertaining to Rebels,) free that are able and willing to bear Arms, they joining His MAJESTY'S Troops as soon as may be, for the more speedily reducing this Colony to a proper Sense of their Duty, to His MAJESTY'S Crown and Dignity.

— Lord Dunmore's Proclamation, November 7, 1775

About 800 men joined up; some helped rout the Virginia militia at the Battle of Kemp's Landing and fought in the Battle of Great Bridge on the Elizabeth River, wearing the motto "Liberty to Slaves", but this time they were defeated. The remains of their regiment were then involved in the evacuation of Norfolk, after which they served in the Chesapeake area. Unfortunately the camp that they had set up there suffered an outbreak of smallpox and other diseases. This took a heavy toll, putting many of them out of action for some time. The survivors joined other British units and continued to serve throughout the war. Blacks were often the first to come forward to volunteer and a total of 12,000 blacks served with the British from 1775 to 1783. This factor had the effect of forcing the rebels to also offer freedom to those who would serve in the Continental Army; ultimately, more than 5,000 African Americans (many of them enslaved) served in Patriot military units during the war.

In general though, the war left the institution of slavery largely unaffected, and the prosperous life of Maryland planters continued.

== After the war ==
The Official flag of the State of Maryland still retains the arms of the Calvert family, the Barons Baltimore.

In 1783, Henry Harford, the last proprietarial governor of Maryland and the illegitimate son of Frederick Calvert, 6th Baron Baltimore, attempted to recover his estates in Maryland which had been confiscated during the American Revolution, where he was a witness to George Washington's resignation of command at Annapolis. He and Governor Eden were invited to stay at the home of Dr. Upton Scott and his nephew, Francis Scott Key. However, he had no success in retrieving his land, in spite of the fact that Charles Carroll of Carrollton and Samuel Chase argued in his favor. In 1786, the case was decided by the Maryland General Assembly. Although it passed in the House, the Senate unanimously rejected it. In their reasoning for this rejection, the Senate cited Henry's absence during the war, and his father Frederick's alienation of his subjects, as major factors.

Returning to Britain, he claimed compensation through the English courts and was awarded £100,000.

Some trace of the Calvert family's proprietarial rule in Maryland still remains. Frederick County, Maryland, is named after the last Baron Baltimore, as well as counties after other family members such as Calvert, Cecil, Baltimore, Charles, Caroline, and Anne Arundel. and the official flag of the State of Maryland, uniquely among the 50 states, bears witness to their family legacy.

Following the Maryland State Convention of 1788, Maryland became the seventh state to ratify the United States Constitution.

== See also ==
- Annapolis Convention (1774–1776)
- Chestertown Tea Party
- Frederick Calvert, 6th Baron Baltimore
- History of Maryland
- List of delegates to the Maryland Constitutional Convention (1776)
- List of delegates to the Maryland State Convention (1788)
- Oath of Fidelity and Support
- Province of Maryland
