= Tea Party =

A tea party is a formal gathering for afternoon tea.

Tea Party may also refer to:

- Tea Party (play), by Harold Pinter, 1965
- "Tea Party" (song), by Kerli, from the album Almost Alice 2010
- The Tea Party (band), a Canadian rock band
  - The Tea Party (album), 1991
- Tea Party movement, a US political movement launched in 2009
  - Tea Party protests, political protests 2009-10
- "The Tea Party" (Ever Decreasing Circles), a 1984 television episode

== See also ==
- Boston Tea Party (disambiguation)
- Chestertown Tea Party (May 1774)
- Edenton Tea Party (October 25, 1774)
- Philadelphia Tea Party (December 25, 1773)
- Tea Party Caucus
