= Boston Tea Party (disambiguation) =

The Boston Tea Party was a 1773 colonial protest action which presaged the American Revolution.

Boston Tea Party may also refer to:

- Boston Tea Party (political party), a libertarian U.S. political party founded in 2006
- Boston Tea Party (café chain), a chain of cafés in England
- Boston Tea Party (concert venue), a concert venue in Boston, Massachusetts, during the late 1960s
- Boston Tea Party (TV series), a Swedish TV show
- The Boston Tea Party (1908 film), a film by Edwin S. Porter
- The Boston Tea Party (1915 film), a film by Eugene Nowland
- The Boston Tea Party, a 1934 film narrated by John B. Kennedy
- Boston Tea Party, an educational Disney film excerpted from Johnny Tremain
- The Boston Tea Party, a 1976 play by Allan Albert
- "Boston Tea Party", a song by the Sensational Alex Harvey Band from the album SAHB Stories

== See also ==
- Boston T. Party or Kenneth W. Royce, American libertarian author
- Tea party (disambiguation)
- Tea Party protests, a series of hundreds of protests first organized in 2009
- Philadelphia Tea Party, an event occurring days after the Boston Tea Party
