= Sherwood Manor (St. Michaels, Maryland) =

Historic house in Maryland, United States

- U.S. National Register of Historic Places
- Location within Maryland Location within the United States
- Location: Old Claiborne Road, St. Michaels, Maryland
- Coordinates: 38°50′0″N 76°15′42″W
- Area: 19.5 acres (7.9 ha)
- NRHP reference No.: 77000701
- Added to NRHP: April 5, 1977

Sherwood Manor, also known as Sherwood's Neck, is a historic home about four miles west of Saint Michaels, Talbot County, Maryland. It is a post-Revolutionary War brick structure located on a small point of land in Hemmersley Creek. The house is a five bay, two story brick structure, with an unusual pair of inset panels, the size of windows, on both stories of the west gable end. It was acquired in 1771 by Matthew Tilghman, a Maryland statesman and onetime member of the Continental Congress, to augment his own large property holdings in the area, which included his home at Rich Neck Manor. Matthew Tilghman's son, Lloyd Tilghman, occupied the Sherwood property and built Sherwood Manor some time before 1798.

Sherwood Manor was listed on the National Register of Historic Places in 1977.
