= Edward Lloyd IV =

American planter and delegate to the Continental Congress for Maryland (1744–1796)

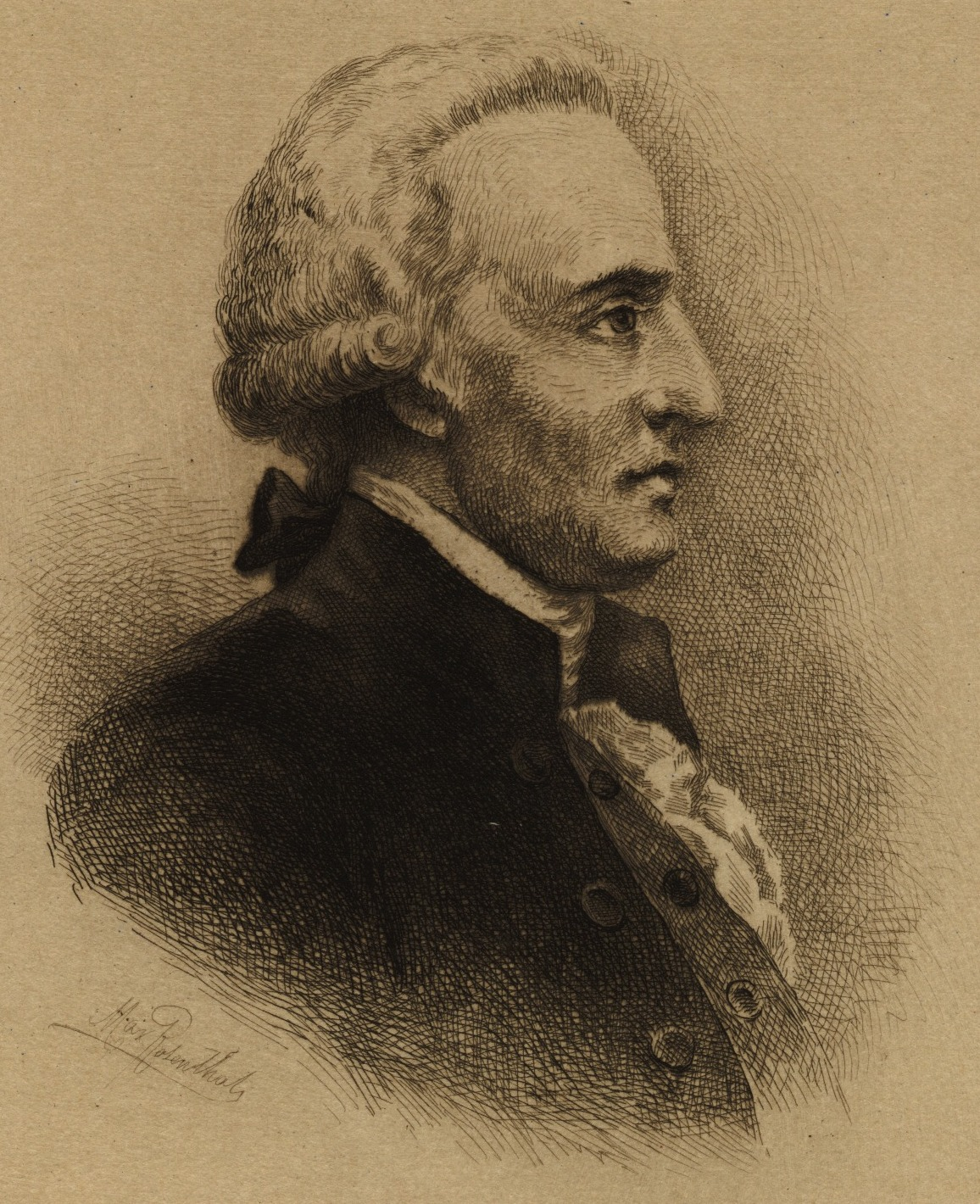
- Etching of Edward Lloyd by Max Rosenthal
- Born: December 15, 1744; Talbot County
- Died: July 8, 1796
- Occupation: Politician
- Children: Edward Lloyd V
- Relatives: Edward Lloyd II (grandfather); John Tayloe II (of Mount Airy) (father-in-law)

Edward Lloyd IV (December 15, 1744 – July 8, 1796) was an American planter from Talbot County, Maryland. He was a delegate to the Continental Congress for Maryland in 1783 and 1784. From 1771 to 1774, he was a member of the General Assembly and in the Maryland State House of Representatives in 1780. In 1771 Lloyd purchased the Chase–Lloyd House in Annapolis, Maryland from Samuel Chase, and in 1790 he built Wye House on the family plantation near Easton, Maryland. The property is now listed as a National Historic Landmark. He was a delegate to the Maryland State Convention of 1788, to vote whether Maryland should ratify the proposed Constitution of the United States.

He married Elizabeth Tayloe, daughter of Col John Tayloe II the wealthiest Virginia Planter of his time. Elizabeth's brother and successor to the wealthiest planter moniker, John Tayloe III, built The Octagon House in Washington, DC at the behest of George Washington. Their son, also Edward Lloyd, was later Governor of Maryland, and a U.S. Senator.

== See also ==
- Talbot Resolves
- Ratcliffe Manor
