= Zachariah Hood =

American businessman

Zachariah Hood was an Annapolis businessman who in 1765 was given the job of stamp collector for the Province of Maryland, collecting the duty payable under the new Stamp Act. Returning to Maryland from England in August 1765, he was attacked by an angry mob, and was forced to flee to New York for his life, in what may have been the first forcible resistance in America to British taxation in the years preceding the American Revolution. Hood returned to Maryland but, finding himself persona non grata, he left for the West Indies. In 1774 he was appointed comptroller of the Port of Philadelphia, but he fared little better and in May 1775 he was forced again to flee, this time to England, where he was granted a salary by Prime Minister Lord North.

Hood was born in Maryland, the son of Elizabeth Maccubin. He had a sister, Susannah.

== Tax, politics and revolution ==
In 1764 Britain imposed a tax on sugar, the first of many ultimately unsuccessful attempts to make her North American subjects bear a portion of the cost of the recent French and Indian War. The first stirrings of revolution in Maryland came in the Fall of 1765, when the speaker of the Lower House of the Maryland General Assembly received a number of letters from Massachusetts, one proposing a meeting of delegates from all the colonies, others objecting to British taxation without consent and proposing that Marylanders should be "free of any impositions, but such as they consent to by themselves or their representatives".

In 1765 Hood was on business in England, where he was offered (and accepted) the job of stamp collector, collecting the duty payable under the new Stamp Act. It is likely that Hood was not aware of the depth of feeling in the colonies against the new tax. In the summer of 1765 protests took place all over the Province, with mock funerals and the hanging, whipping and burning of effigies. Fearful for his life, Hood, at the invitation of Governor Cadwallader Colden of New York, fled to New York and took refuge at Fort George. Hood would prove to be the first and last Stamp Act tax collector in Maryland.

== Hood returns to Maryland ==
News of Hood's appointment preceded his return to Annapolis, being published in the Maryland Gazette, a newspaper owned by one Jonas Green, a vocal and outspoken opponent of the new tax. The August 22 edition of the Gazette reported that a "Gentleman in London" had reported that Hood had let it be known that if the new tax should be imposed, it was at least preferable that it should be collected by a native son.

On August 26 the future Supreme Court Justice Samuel Chase organised "a considerable number of people, assertors of British American privileges" to create an effigy of Hood, complete with mock stamp paper, and burn it on a gallows.

A few days later, Hood returned to Maryland, where passions were by now greatly inflamed, and was met at the Annapolis dock by an angry crowd which prevented him from landing. Attacked by the mob, Hood defended himself and one citizen was seriously injured in what has been called the "first successful, forcible resistance in America to King George's authority".

Hood refused to resign his commission and, a few days later, a mob of 300 citizens burned down his warehouse. Hood asked Governor Sharpe if he ought to resign, but the Governor was unable to offer him any comfort, reporting in September 1765:

I could not take upon myself to give him such advice, and as both he and his relations doubted whether he could, while the ferment continued, be safe in mine or any other house in the Province, he has retired for a few weeks to New York. To what lengths people who have made such a beginning may go to render the act of Parliament ineffectual, I cannot tell, but am very apprehensive that if the stamp paper was to arrive here and be landed at this time it would not be in my power to preserve it from being burnt.

Shunned by his friends and concerned for his life, the terrified Hood fled Maryland for New York, and at the invitation of governor Cadwallader Colden of New York took refuge at Fort George . Such was his fear that he spurred his horse on until the poor beast died from under him. There, said the Gazette, "he remains, hid from the resentment of his countrymen, but not from the terrors of his conscience". Hearing this, the New York Sons of Liberty tracked him down and pressed him to resign. Hood again fled, this time to Flushing, where he was again hunted down. On 28 November, his resignation was at last forcibly obtained. The Baltimore Sons of Liberty thanked the New Yorkers for bringing Hood "to a sense of his treachery to his country, and for causing him before a magistrate on his oath, to renounce the despicable employment."

Later Hood made his way back to Maryland but found himself persona non grata, and he left the Province for the West Indies where his fortunes ebbed to such a degree that he found himself destitute. By 1771 his position was so desperate that he was forced to petition the Crown for relief.

In 1774 he was appointed comptroller of the Port of Philadelphia but here he fared little better. He was beaten by the "Son in Law" of Benjamin Franklin and was forced to flee to England in May 1775, where he was granted a salary by Prime Minister Lord North.

== In fiction ==
Hood appears as a character in Winston Churchill's historical novel Richard Carvel, in which the author dramatises Hood's arrival at the Annapolis docks. Hood is accused by the mob of having "come to lick stamps for his brother-colonists", but only "after licking his majesty's boots".

== See also ==
- Maryland in the American Revolution

== Citations ==
14. Pynchon, Thomas, p.571, "Mason & Dixon" - Einaudi

== Bibliography ==
- Andrews, Matthew Page, History of Maryland, Doubleday Doran & Co, New York, (1929)
- Chapelle, Suzanne, et al., Maryland: A History of its People Retrieved September 2012
- Engelman, F. L. (October 1953). "Cadwallader Colden and the New York Stamp Act Riots". The William and Mary Quarterly. 10 (4). Omohundro Institute of Early American History and Culture: 560–578. doi:10.2307/1923595. JSTOR 1923595.
- Coke, Daniel Parker, The Royal Commission on the Losses and Services of American Loyalists Retrieved September 2012
- Jensen, Merrill, The Founding of a Nation: A History of the American Revolution, 1763-1776 September 2012
- McWilliams, Jane W., Annapolis, City on the Severn: A History Retrieved September 2012
- Russell, David Lee, The American Revolution in the Southern Colonies Retrieved September 2012
- Ranlet, Philip (1986). The New York loyalists. Knoxville: University of Tennessee Press. ISBN 978-0-87049-5038.
