= Chase–Lloyd House =

Historic house in Maryland, United States

- Chase-Lloyd House
- U.S. National Register of Historic Places
- U.S. National Historic Landmark
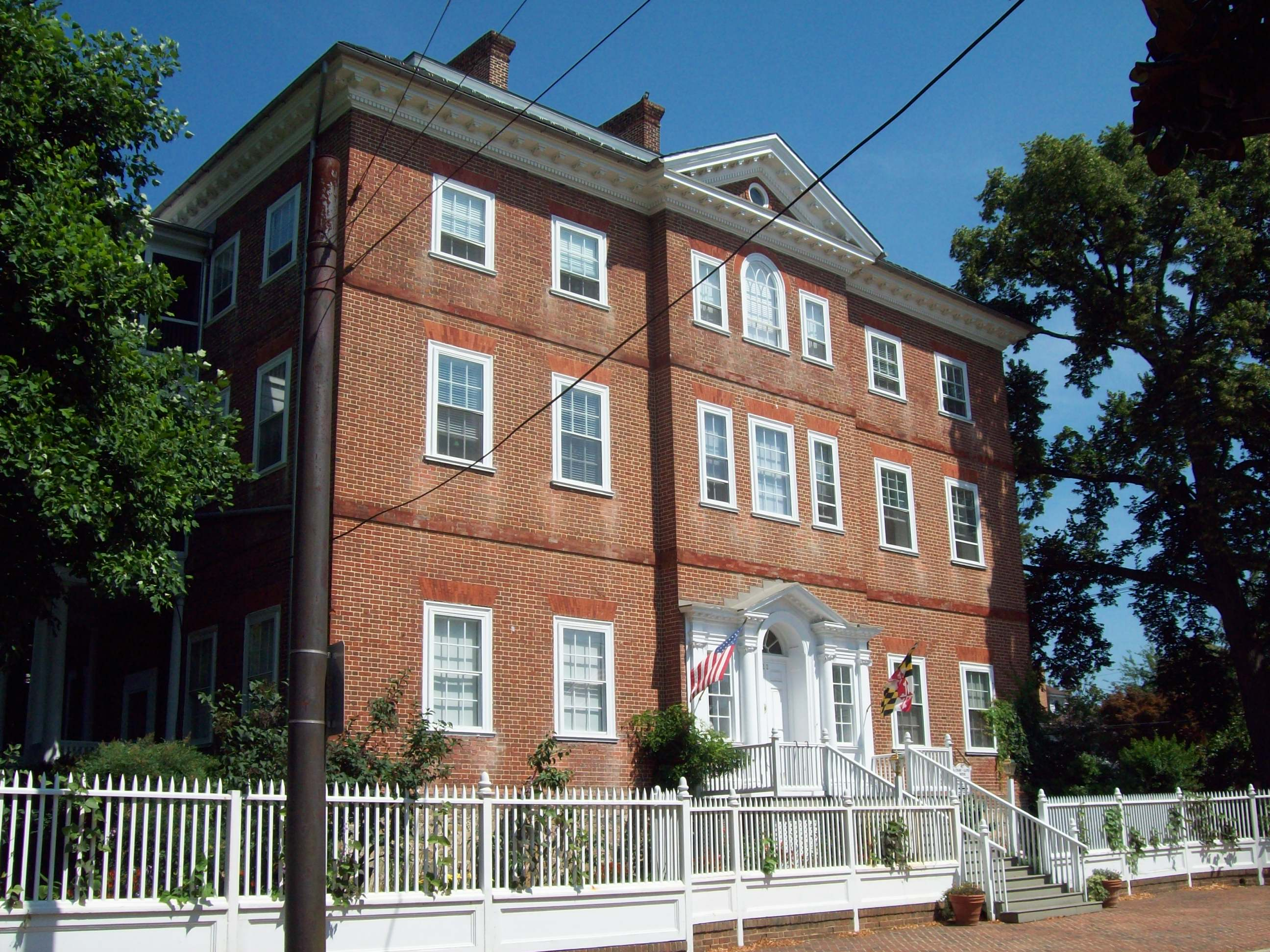
- Chase–Lloyd House, July 2009

- Location within Maryland Location within the United States
- Location: 22 Maryland Avenue, Annapolis, Maryland
- Coordinates: 38°58′52″N 76°29′19.7″W
- Built: 1769
- Architect: Buckland, William and Noke, William
- Architectural style: Georgian
- NRHP reference No.: 70000260

Significant dates
- Added to NRHP: April 15, 1970
- Designated NHL: April 15, 1970

The Chase–Lloyd House is a historic house at 22 Maryland Avenue in Annapolis, Maryland. Built in 1769–1774, it is one of the first brick three-story Georgian mansions to be built in the Thirteen Colonies, and is one of the finest examples of the style. Its interiors were designed by William Buckland.

Its construction was started for Samuel Chase, who would later be a signatory to the Declaration of Independence and Associate Justice of the Supreme Court, but Chase sold the building unfinished to Edward Lloyd IV in 1771. Lloyd completed the house in 1774 with assistance from Buckland and another architect, William Noke. The house remained in the Lloyd family until 1847, when it was sold to a relation of Chase. Hester Anne Chase was the daughter of Jeremiah Townley Chase who was Samuel Chase's cousin. When she died, she left the house to her 3 orphan nieces, Francis, Matilda, and Hester. In 1888 the house was bequeathed for use as a home for elderly women by the will of the last living niece, Hester. It continues in this use today. While the upper floors are off limits to visitors, the main floor and the extensive gardens are open to the public.

== Description ==
The three-story brick house stands over a tall basement and measures 54 feet (16 m) wide and 43 feet (13 m) deep. The 18 inches (46 cm) thick walls are laid in Flemish bond with belt courses of rubbed brick at the second and third floor lines. The front is accented by a central three-bay wide projecting pavilion. The three-part central door with pediment, entablature, fanlight and sidelights is unusual for pre-Revolutionary times. Above the door a triple window on the second floor is followed by an arched window on the third floor. Windows are capped by flat arches of rubbed brick. First and second floor windows are six-over-six, while third floor windows are six-over-three. The rear pavilion features a large Palladian window that relates to the main stair landing on the interior.

The house's plan is of the four room, center hall type, but on a very large scale. The entrance hall contains a screen of free-standing Ionic order Ionic columns, beyond which a central stair rises to the large Palladian window at the landing. The ascending stair flights split at the landing, rising in parallel runs to flank the first run on either side. The flights were originally unsupported, but supports have since been inserted to correct sagging.

Interior ceilings feature plaster moldings in the manner of Robert Adam. The woodwork, and particularly the door frames of the first floor, is extensively carved. Interior doors are six-panel mahogany with wrought-silver handles. The most elaborate woodwork is in the dining room; this room has, however, lost its original plaster ceiling. On the second floor the bedrooms are accessed through arched openings with panels in the reveals. The house's original kitchen was located in the basement.

A separate structure to the rear, called the Chase Annex, is a 19th-century addition.

The house was designated a National Historic Landmark in 1970.

== See also ==
- Wye House: National Historic Landmark in Talbot County, Maryland, built for Edward Lloyd IV in 1790.
- Hammond–Harwood House, another National Historic Landmark, located across the street
- Colonial families of Maryland
- List of National Historic Landmarks in Maryland
- National Register of Historic Places in Anne Arundel County, Maryland

== Gallery ==
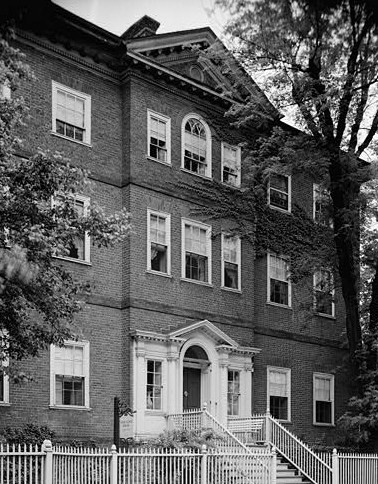
Chase–Lloyd House, May 1942

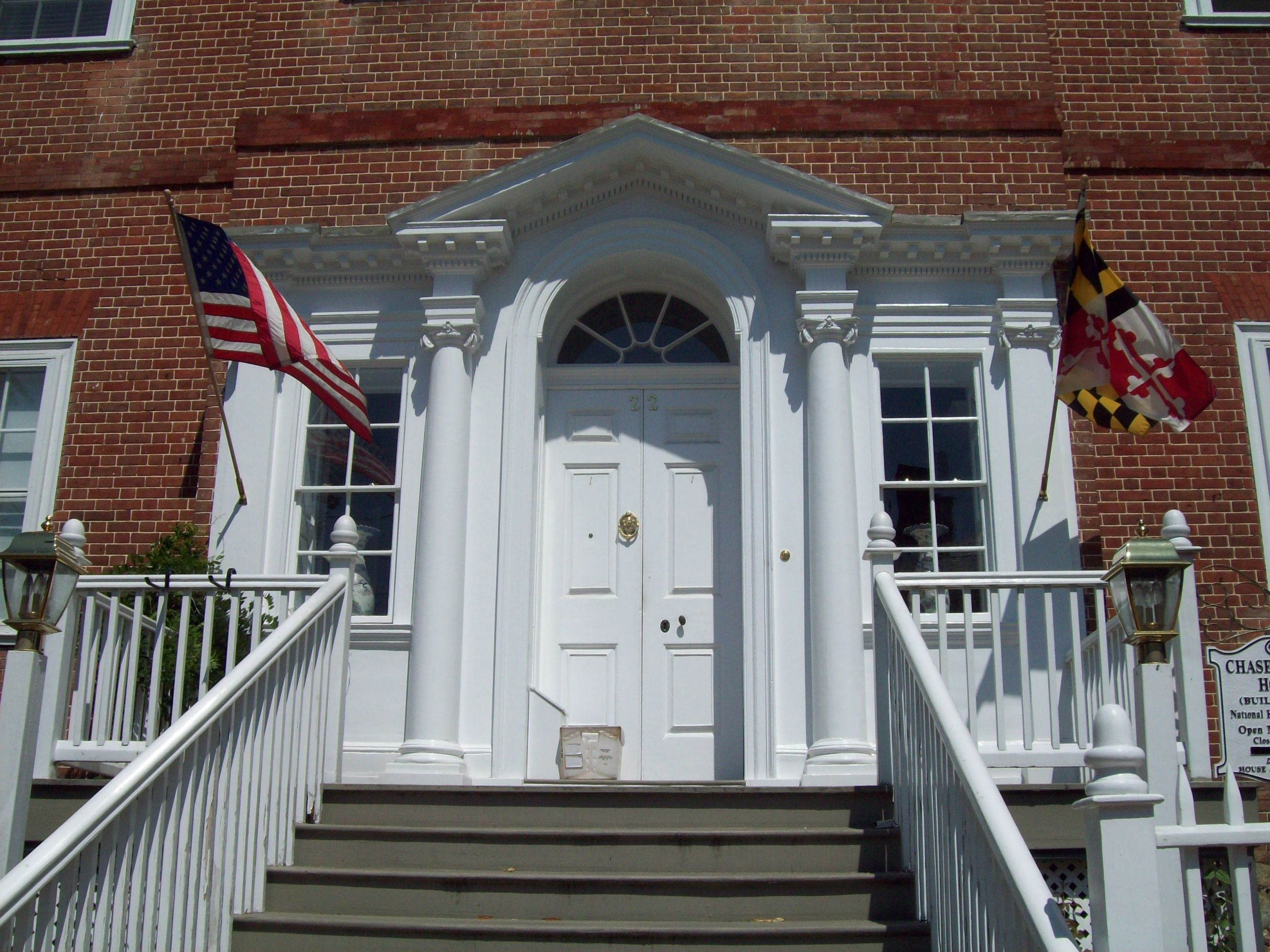
Chase–Lloyd House, Entry Detail, July 2009
