= Matthew Tilghman =

American politician (1718–1790)

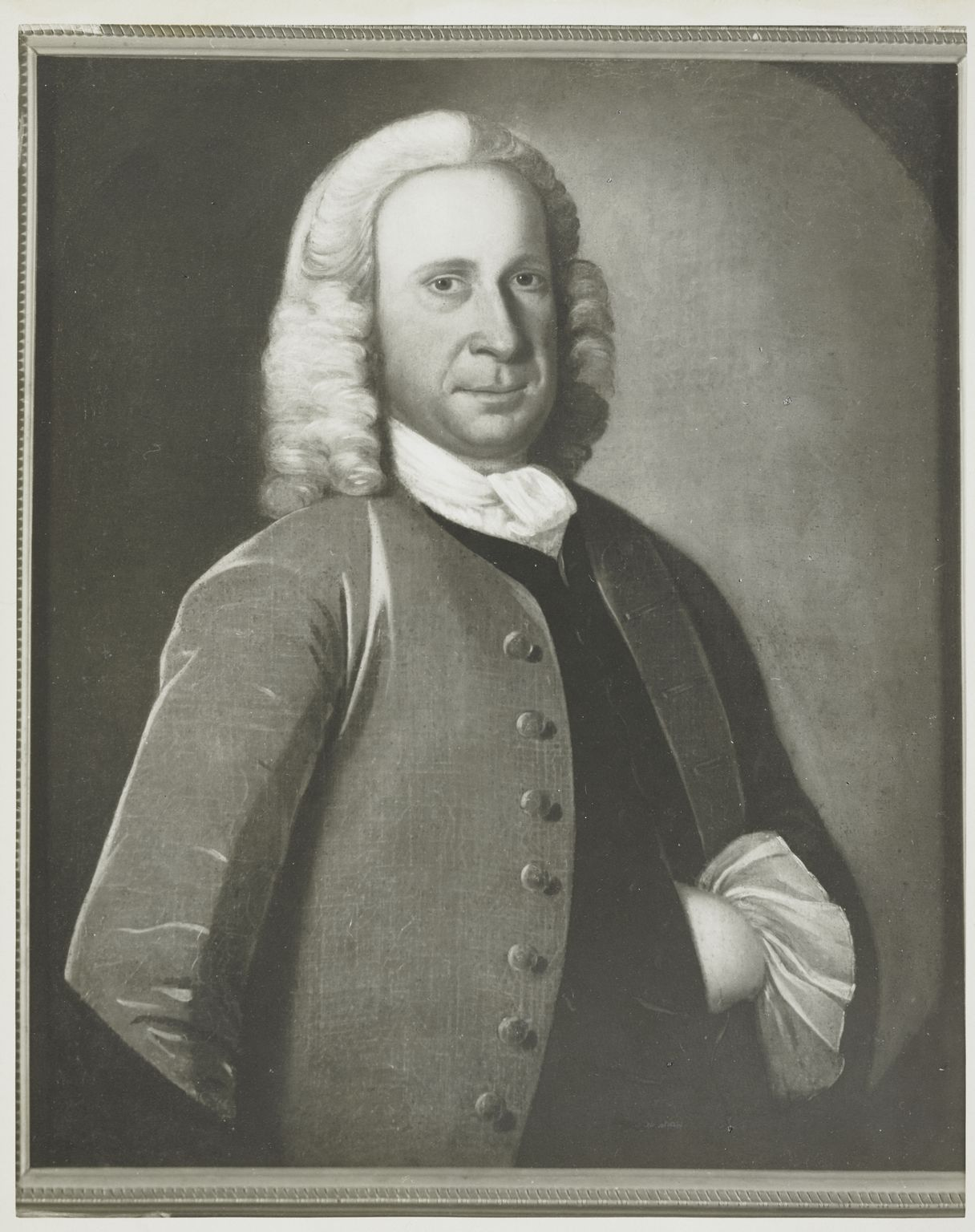
- Born: February 17, 1718; Queen Anne's County
- Died: May 4, 1790 (aged 72)
- Occupation: Politician

Matthew Tilghman (February 17, 1718 – May 4, 1790) was an American planter, and Revolutionary leader from Maryland. He served as a delegate to the Continental Congress from 1774 to 1776, where he signed the 1774 Continental Association.

== Early life ==
Coat of Arms of Matthew Tilghman

Tilghman was born on the family plantation, The Hermitage, near Centreville in Queen Anne's County, Maryland. Tilghman was the grandson of one of the early settlers in Maryland. His grandfather, Richard Tilghman (1626–1675) had been a surgeon in the British navy and established the family plantation at the Hermitage. His father, also named Richard Tilghman (1672–1738), was a planter.

He was educated through private tutoring before moving to Talbot County on the Eastern Shore (of Chesapeake Bay). Tilghman married Anne Lloyd (1723–1794) on April 6, 1741. The couple took up residence on a large plantation in Claiborne, Maryland, known as Rich Neck Manor.

Tilghman's first public service was as a justice of the peace for Talbot County. In 1751 he was elected to the Maryland House of Delegates. He served there through the remainder of its service to the colony, although in 1760 and 1761 he represented Queen Anne's County. (Maryland, like several other colonies, permitted a representative to be elected by any district in which he owned property.) He was elected the speaker of the House from 1773 to its end in 1775.

== Revolutionary period ==
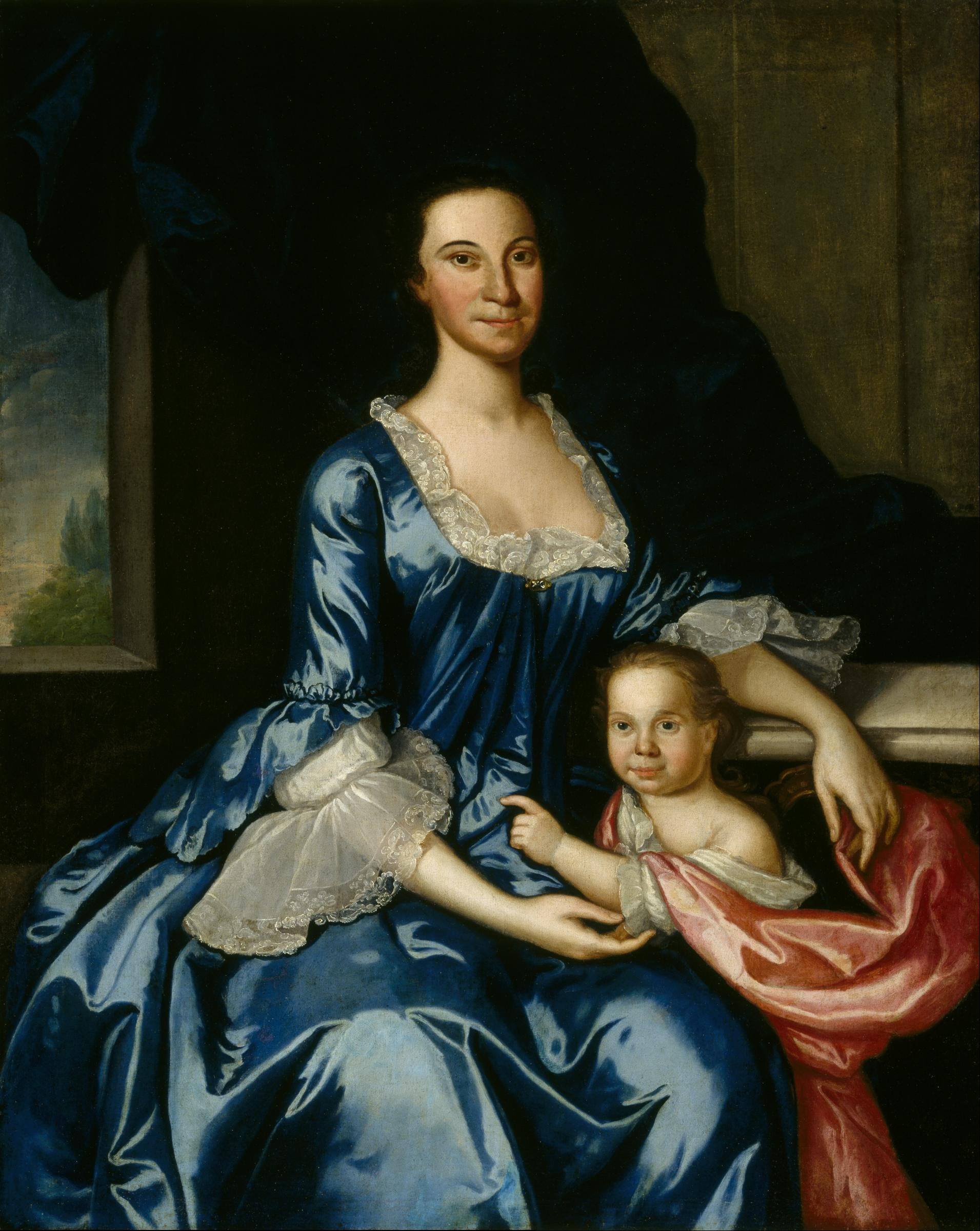
Anna Lloyd Tilghman and Anna Maria Tilghman

In the early days of the American Revolution, Tilghman was in the forefront of the political revolution in Maryland. He was an early member of the colony's committee of correspondence. For three years (1774–1776) he effectively headed the revolution in Maryland. He was the chairman of the Committee of Safety, president of the revolutionary assembly known as the Annapolis Convention, and the head of the Maryland delegation to the Continental Congress.

While in the Congress, Tilghman debated and supported the Declaration of Independence. He voted for its final approval but was replaced in the Congress by Charles Carroll of Carrollton before a copy was signed. Tilghman had to return home to preside over a longer session of the Annapolis Convention that established a new government for Maryland. Besides being president of the Convention, he headed the committee that drafted the Charter of Rights and Plan of Government that became Maryland's constitution. When the state government went into effect later in 1776, Tilghman was elected to the state Senate. He served there until 1783, and from 1780 to 1783 he was president of the Senate.

== Later life and family ==
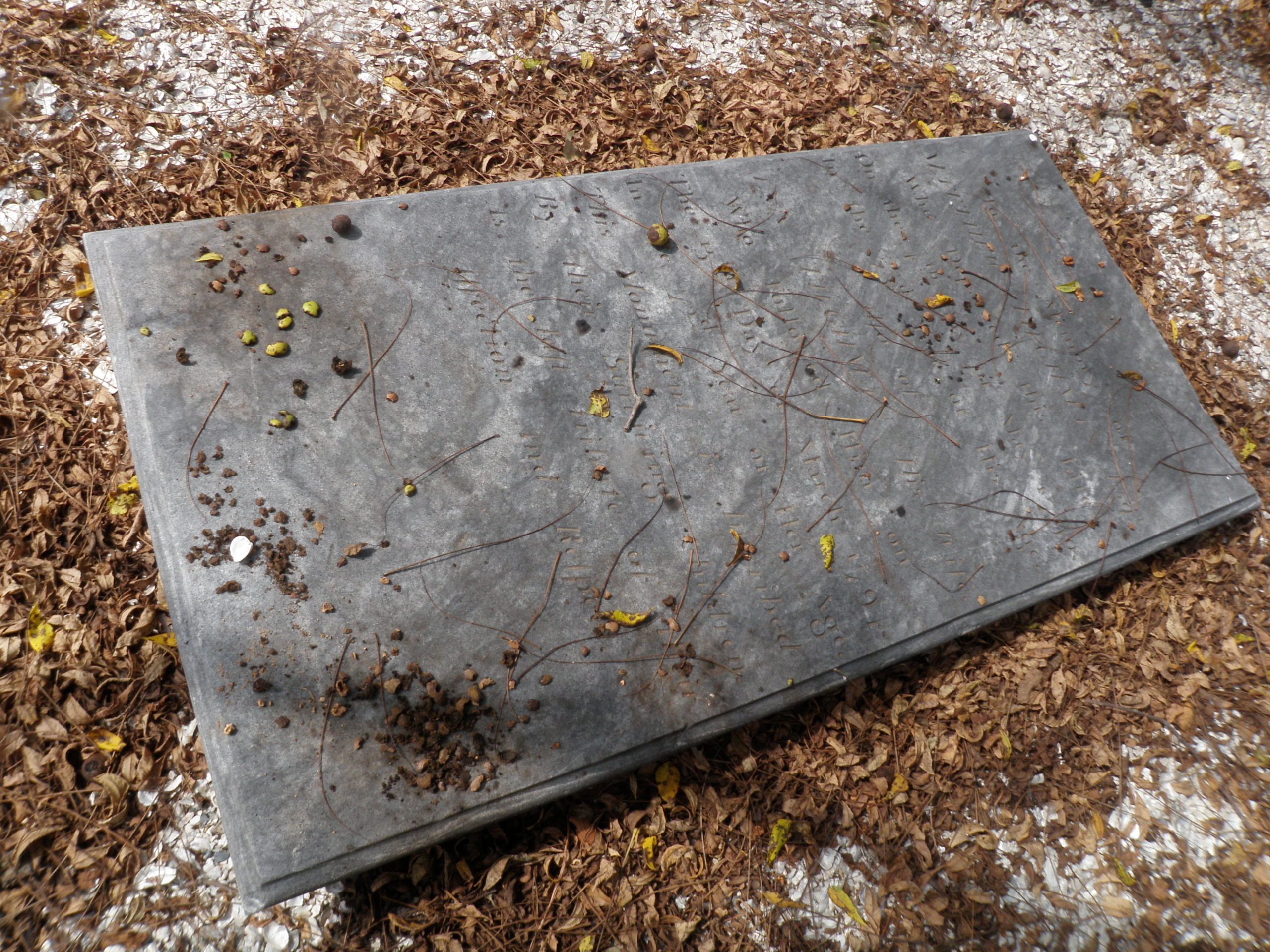
Grave of Matthew Tilghman at Rich Neck Manor

In 1771 Tilghman acquired property near his Rich Neck Manor on Sherwood's Neck. In 1783 he retired from public life and attended to his properties. Tilghman died at his home Rich Neck Manor on May 4, 1790, and was buried in a family cemetery there.

Matthew and his wife Anna Lloyd Tilghman (1723–1794) had five children: Margaret (1742–1817), Matthew Ward (1743–1753), Richard (1747–1806), Lloyd (1749–1811), and Anna Maria (1755–1843). Margaret married Charles Carroll, Barrister. Richard served as a major in militia of Queen Anne's County during the Revolutionary War. Anna Maria married her cousin Tench Tilghman on June 9, 1783.

Tilghman's son Lloyd built his own home on Sherwood's Neck, known as Sherwood Manor. Sherwood Manor was added to the National Register of Historic Places in 1977. Both Rich Neck Manor and Sherwood Manor are private property.

== See also ==
- Memorial to the 56 Signers of the Declaration of Independence
- Talbot Resolves

Political offices
Preceded by Daniel of St. Thomas Jenifer	President of the Maryland State Senate; 1780	Succeeded by Daniel of St. Thomas Jenifer
Preceded by George Plater	President of the Maryland State Senate; 1782–1783	Succeeded by Charles Carroll of Carrollton
