= Wye House =

Historic house in Maryland, United States

Coordinates: 38.853398°N 76.168406°W

- U.S. National Register of Historic Places
- U.S. National Historic Landmark
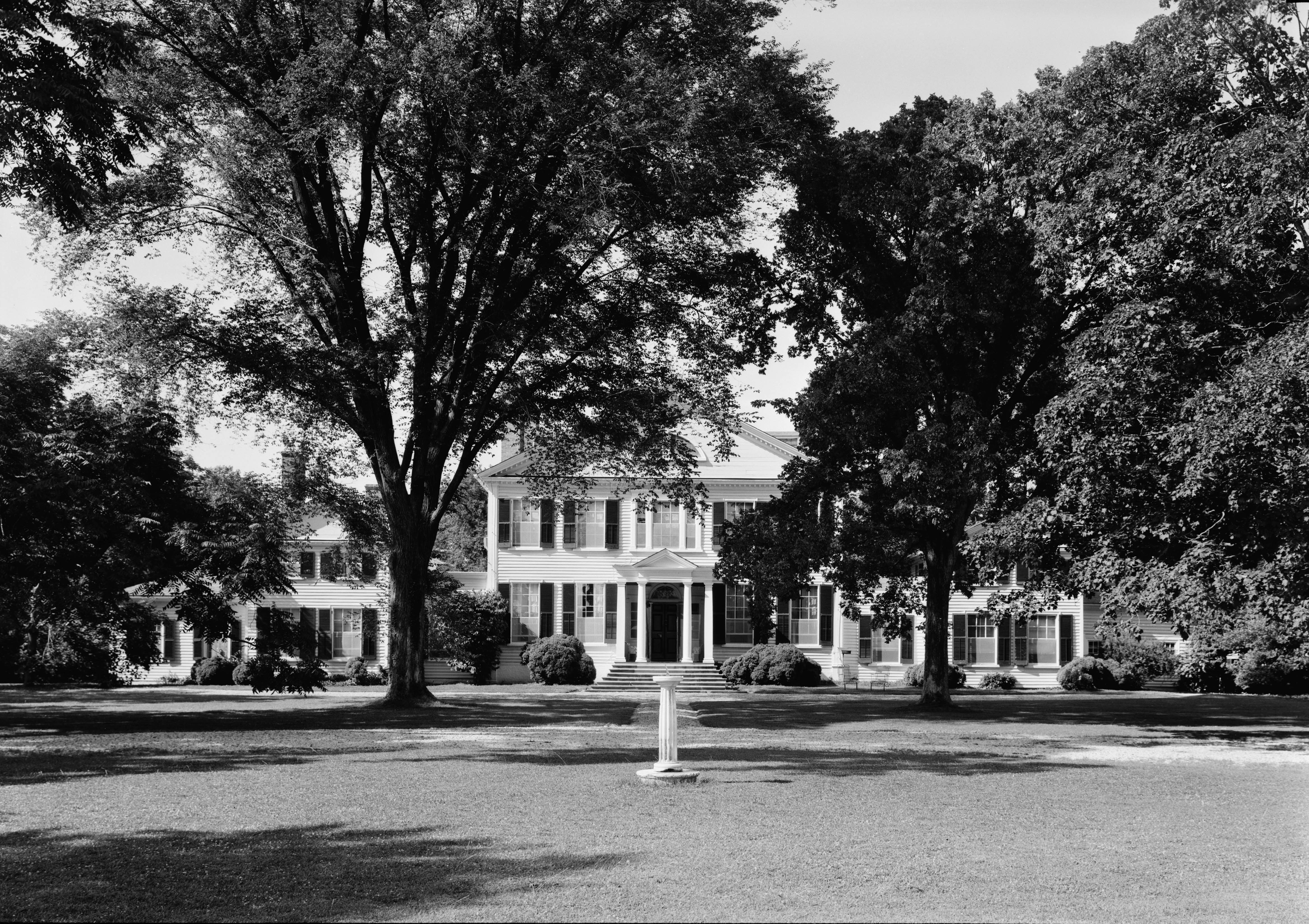
- Wye House mansion, seen from the front lawn

- Location within Maryland Location within the United States
- Nearest city: Easton, Maryland
- Built: 1784
- Architect: Key, Robert
- Architectural style: Georgian, Federal
- NRHP reference No.: 70000264

Significant dates
- Added to NRHP: April 15, 1970
- Designated NHL: April 15, 1970

Wye House is a historic residence and former headquarters of a historic plantation house northwest of Easton in rural Talbot County, Maryland. Built in 1781–1784, it is a high-quality and well-proportioned example of a wooden-frame Southern plantation house. It was designated a National Historic Landmark in 1970.

== History ==
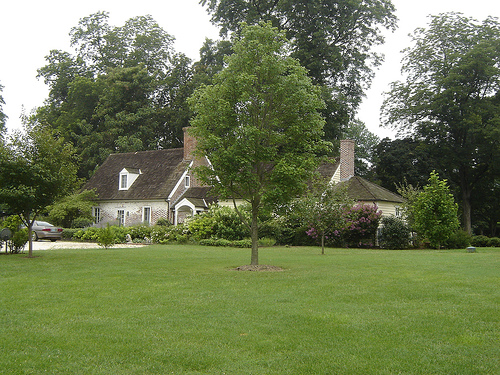
The "Captain's House" on Wye Plantation

The Wye plantation was created in the 1650s by a Welsh Puritan and wealthy planter, Edward Lloyd. Between 1780 and 1790, the main house was built by his great-great-grandson, Edward Lloyd IV, using the profits generated by the forced labor of enslaved people. It is cited as an example between the transition of Georgian and Federal architecture, which is attributed to builder Robert Key. Nearby the house is an orangery, a rare survival of an early garden structure where orange and lemon trees were cultivated, and which still contains its original 18th-century heating system of hot-air ducts.

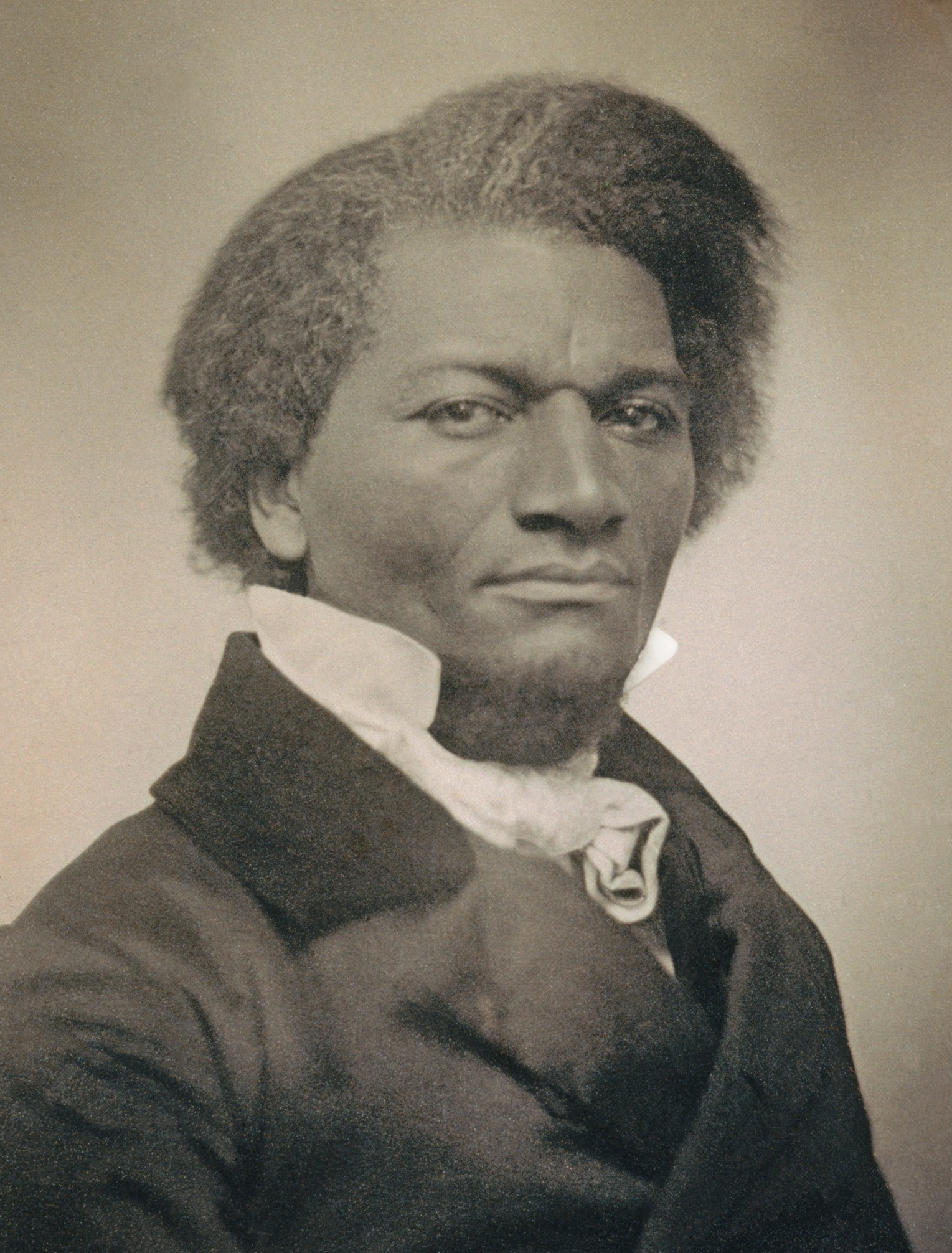
Frederick Douglass, enslaved on the plantation when he was a child.

During its peak, the plantation's owners enslaved more than 1,000 people to work lands that totaled more than 42,000 acres (17,000 ha). Though the land has shrunk to 1,300 acres (530 ha) today, it is still owned by the descendants of Edward Lloyd, now in their 11th generation on the property. Frederick Douglass was enslaved on the plantation, from around the ages of seven and eight, and spoke extensively of the brutal conditions of the plantation in his autobiography, Narrative of the Life of Frederick Douglass, an American Slave.

== Modern situation ==
The nearby hamlets of Unionville and Copperville are now home to many descendants of the people who were enslaved at Wye House. This has created an interesting dynamic, with the descendants of the enslavers and the enslaved living within a very short distance of one another.

The Wye House plantation gained media attention in 2006 for archaeological investigations led by the University of Maryland.

In 2011, excavation of the greenhouse, built by enslaved African people, brought a discovery of African charms laid to ward off bad spirits at the house's furnace and entrance.

== See also ==
- Chase–Lloyd House, a National Historic Landmark in Annapolis, Maryland, owned by the Lloyd family 1771–1847.
- List of National Historic Landmarks in Maryland
- National Register of Historic Places listings in Talbot County, Maryland
- Ratcliffe Manor - built by Henry Hollyday, son of James Hollyday and Sarah Covington Lloyd Hollyday
- Readbourne - built by James Hollyday and Sarah Covington Lloyd Hollyday
- Mount Misery
