= Chestertown Tea Party =

Political protests by American colonists

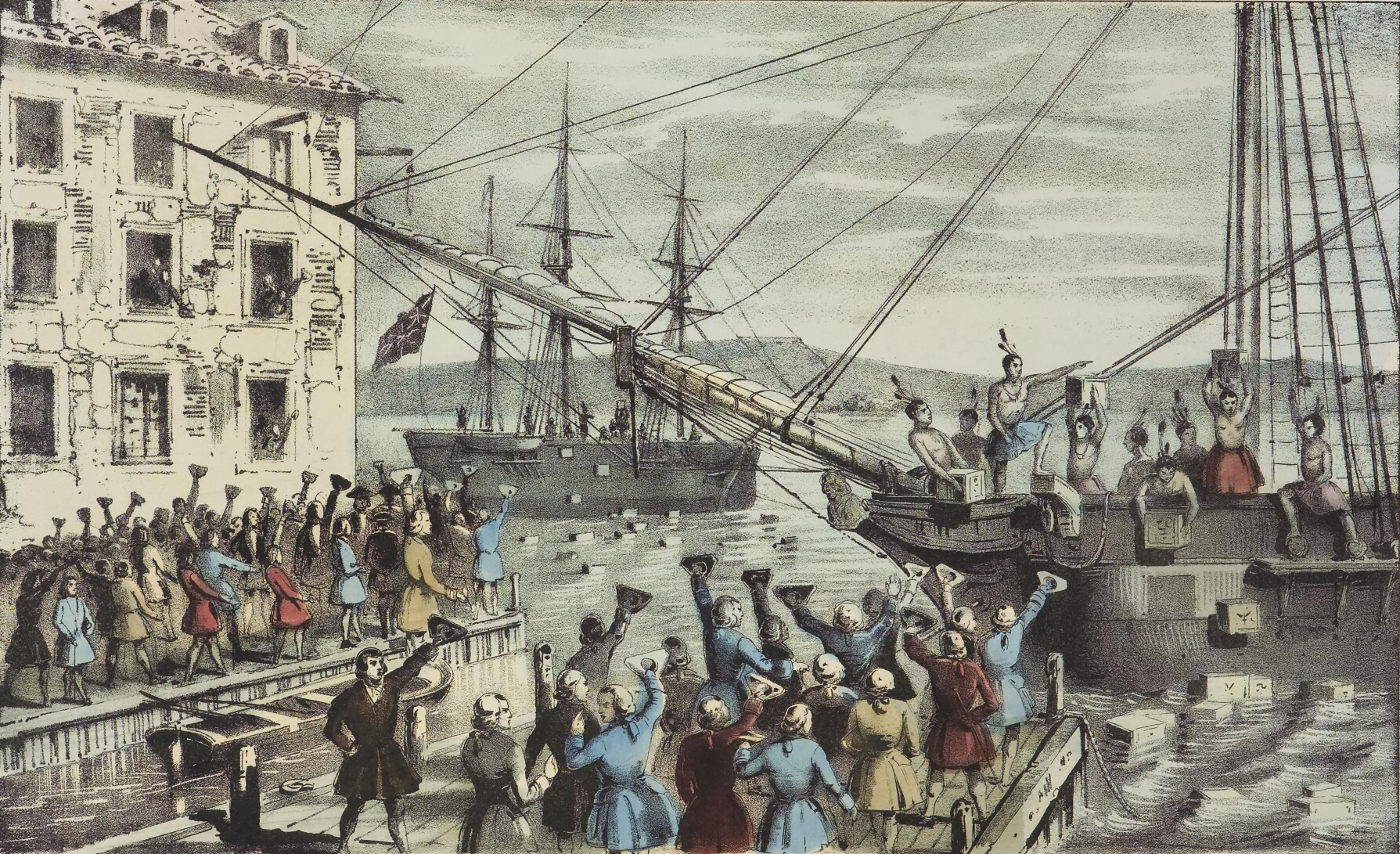
The famous Boston Tea Party, shown here in an 1846 lithograph by Nathaniel Currier.

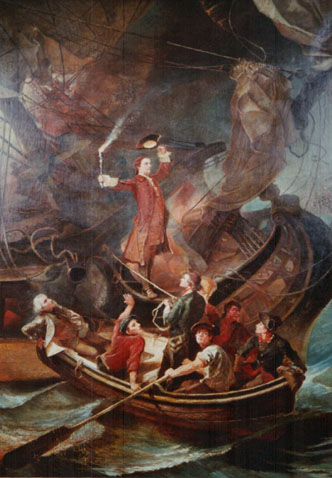
Painting by Francis Blackwell Mayer, 1896, depicting the burning of the Peggy Stewart, known as the Annapolis Tea Party.

The Chestertown Tea Party was a protest against British excise duties which, according to local legend, took place in May 1774 in Chestertown, Maryland, as a response to the British Tea Act. Chestertown tradition holds that, following the example of the more famous Boston Tea Party, colonial patriots boarded the brigantine Geddes in broad daylight and threw its cargo of tea into the Chester River. The event is celebrated each Memorial Day weekend with a festival and historic reenactment called the Chestertown Tea Party Festival.

== Background ==
=== Relations with England ===
In 1767 in an effort to raise money for England by taxing the Thirteen Colonies, Parliament passed the Townshend Acts, as part of a series of other acts, including the Sugar Act, Stamp Act, and Coercive Acts. The Townshend Acts placed taxes on several important items in the Colonial economy including paper, paint, lead, glass and tea. Reaction to the Townshend Acts in the thirteen colonies was so negative that on March 5, 1770, Parliament decided to repeal most of the duties, however, they decided that the tax on tea would remain.

As a result, many colonists refused to buy (boycotted) tea that came to America from England. Instead they smuggled in tea from other countries or made their own tea from local spices. Soon merchants in England began to lose money, especially the East India Company. In order to keep this company from going bankrupt, Parliament passed the Tea Act of 1773. For reasons of economics and social liberty, the colonists were outraged and the seeds of dissent began to grow in the New World.

=== Beginnings in Boston ===
On December 16, 1773, a group of angry rebels calling themselves the "Sons of Liberty" protested the Tea Act and disguised as Mohawk natives boarded three ships in Boston Harbor loaded with tea and proceeded to dump 92,000 pounds of tea into the ocean. King George III reacted to the "tea party" by ordering the closing of the port of Boston.

While Boston's was by far the most famous tea party that occurred in the colonies, it was only the first of many protests against the Tea Act that took place along the Atlantic Coast.

== Events in Chestertown ==
When news of the closing of the port of Boston reached the Chesapeake Bay port of Chester Town, (now Chestertown) on the Eastern Shore of Maryland in the spring of 1774, town leaders called a meeting to discuss what actions should be taken. The local chapter of the Sons of Liberty boldly put forth a list of grievances, which became known as the Chestertown Resolves. These stated that it was unlawful to buy, sell, or drink tea shipped from England.

The "Resolves" are a matter of historic record, reported in the Maryland Gazette, but for the tossing of tea, there is no contemporary evidence; the earliest record dates to the end of 19th century. The Chestertown Tea Party nonetheless remains a major part of local tradition and a source of civic identity.

Shortly after the Resolves were printed, word came to the citizens that a ship in the local harbor, the brigantine Geddes, had come to port with a shipment of tea. According to tradition, on May 23, 1774, a small group of men (unlike their brethren in New England, in broad daylight and without Indian disguise) forcibly boarded the ship and threw its cargo into the Chester River.

== Historic impact ==
The events in Chester Town as well as others in port cities like Boston, Annapolis and Charleston, South Carolina, marked a turning point in relations between England and the Thirteen Colonies.

After these "tea parties", it was clear that the colonists were deeply committed to opposing taxes they viewed as unfair. The destruction of British tea was a defiant act against Parliament and King George and viewed by the Crown as treason. The once distinct and autonomous colonies became united under the resolution that they would not accept "taxation without representation" in any form, and that they were willing to act forcefully to protect that right.

== Historic record and authenticity ==
The authenticity of the Chestertown Tea Party has been questioned by historians, who have been able to find no record prior to the end of the nineteenth century. The first mention of a "tea party" dates from 1899, in a booklet about Chestertown by Fred G. Usilton called History of Chestertown: Gem City on the Chester. Usilton was involved with the local newspaper, which was edited by his father.

Usilton gives no source for his story. Despite efforts to find primary sources (letters, diaries, news accounts) this remains the earliest account. It was picked up in a state of Maryland publication in 1903. Usilton's tale – which could have been nothing more than patriotic embroidery for the Chestertown Resolves – appears to have gained currency in 1906, Chestertown's 200th anniversary. In 1915, Usilton published a county history which included the tale.

In the 1950s, newspaper editor Bill Usilton (Fred's son) revived the story for the town's 250th anniversary. Later, Bill Usilton expanded on the 1915 history book and the Tea Party tale was included.

Through all those years, however, no additional documentation was presented.

Contemporary news accounts of protests and destruction in 1774 are documented in New York; Yorktown, Va., and Annapolis. Chestertown, at the time, was a major commercial center, but Colonial newspapers are silent about the legendary tea-dumping.

A strand remains. The Brigantine Geddes bears the name of a respected local merchant and collector of customs, William Geddes. She was built in 1773, in Chestertown. Surviving port records show the ship was in the Chesapeake around the time of the legendary tea party, having returned from a voyage to Europe that began the previous fall. The owner is listed as James Nicholson and the captain, John Harrison.

Geddes was in the vicinity between about May 7 and May 24, when she cleared customs outbound for Madeira. So part of the legend can be documented. There was a brig Geddes and it was in the area in May 1774. It remains uncertain whether tea was aboard.

== Tea Party Festival ==
In the spring of 1968 the citizens of Chestertown staged the first festival to commemorate the actions of their forefathers. The event that year was very small by current standards, but included a parade and historic staging of the events of the fateful day.

With a few years off, the Tea Party Festival has continued every Memorial Day Weekend in earnest since the Bicentennial year of 1976. The current incarnation is showcased by a large colonial parade down High Street, featuring numerous fife and drum bands as well as marching Colonial and British re-enactors.

Local civic clubs offer indigenous cuisine (favorites include cold beer, hot corn, crab cakes and funnel cakes). Craftsmen from around the country ply their wares while musicians, puppeteers and dancers entertain the crowds of as many as 15,000 until the first day culminates with the throng gathering on the bank of the Chester River to cheer for the historic reenactment of the Storming of the Geddes. Colonial re-enactors use the schooner Sultana (a 1768 replica) and they are thrown overboard with the tea.

Other events at the annual event include a cocktail party, homegrown music, historic home tours, the tossing of a major town figure into the river, 10-mile and 5K runs, and a raft race.

== See also ==
- Continental Association
- Philadelphia Tea Party
- Talbot Resolves
