= Oath of Fidelity and Support =

The Province of Maryland was a colony of Great Britain from 1632 until 1776, where Maryland declared itself a sovereign state as one of the Thirteen Colonies declaring independence from Great Britain. The Thirteen Colonies came together to sign the United States Declaration of Independence (the founding document of the United States), which outlined why the United States of America would no longer be subject to British rule and that the Thirteen Colonies would be regarding themselves as sovereign states. This was because they did not want the British to have the power to control the United States, as the British monarchy imposed many laws and taxes, such as the Sugar Act, the Intolerable Acts, Taxation without representation, and the Stamp Act. Many colonists were angry as they were paying taxes to a government that they had no say in and no representation in. They believed that King George III did not care for their interests, and thus wanted independence from British rule.

== Description ==
The Oath of Fidelity and Support, “An Act for the better security of the government,” was an oath swearing allegiance to the state of Maryland and denying allegiance and obedience to Great Britain during the American Revolutionary War and in the early days of American Independence. As enacted by the Maryland General Assembly in 1777, all persons holding any office of profit or trust, including attorneys at law, and all voters were required to take the oath no later than March 1, 1778. Exceptions were made for Quakers, those already serving in the military, Mennonites, and Dunkers, who were not required to swear allegiance, but instead allowed to declare and affirm. The oath stated: "I do sware I do not hold myself bound to yield any Allegiance or obedience to the King Of Great Britain his heirs, or successors and that I will be true and faithful to the State of Maryland and will to the utmost of my power, support maintain and defend the Freedom and independence thereof and the Government as now established against all open enemies and secret and traterous Conspiraces and will use my utmost to disclose and make known to the Governor or some one of the Judges or Justices thereof all Tresasons or Treaterous Consperaces, Attempts or Combinations against this State or the Government thereof which may come to my Knowledge. So Help me God." The oath was signed by residents of every county, including 3,136 residents of Montgomery and Washington counties, and at least 9,000 residents of the Eastern Shore.

In order to identify those that did not take the oath, a census was taken in 1778 of all free men over the age of 18 in several counties. This census took place in Caroline County, Charles County, Queen Anne's County, and Montgomery County. The 1778 census of Montgomery County divided the county into ten hundreds, with a total of 1,803 men being enumerated.

The Ten Hundreds of Montgomery
| Name of hundred | Number of men |
|---|---|
| George Town | 91 |
| Lower Potomack | 175 |
| North West | 102 |
| Upper Newfoundland | 139 |
| Rock Creek | 159 |
| Seneca | 164 |
| Lower Newfoundland | 162 |
| Upper Potomack | 202 |
| Sugar Loaf | 300 |
| Sugarland | 309 |

== Consequences Of Avoiding The Oath ==
Free men over the age of 18 that did not take the oath faced many repercussions, including having to pay triple the initially assessed amount of taxes every year in their lifetime, being unable to file lawsuits, hold any political office, vote, serve in the military, practice law, medicine, preach, be a tradesman, or teach at a school.

Despite these consequences, many people still avoided taking the oath, so in 1778, it was revised and the deadline was extended. Those suspected of not taking the oath were subject to be presented before a justice of the peace or court. If they declined to take the oath, they were then fined and imprisoned. In addition, there were vigilante groups that targeted individuals who were suspected of not taking the oath.

Though many men serving in the armed forces were exempt from this oath, many still took the oath.

Later, in 1781, Maryland allowed members of several religions (such as Quakers and Dunkers) to preach without having signed the oath. Two years later, in 1783, they gave this same permission to Methodists.

== Similarities To Other Documents ==
=== Declaration of Independence ===
Though the Oath of Fidelity and Support is different from the Declaration of Independence in that the former was a localized loyalty pledge central to the state of Maryland while the other focuses on the unity of the thirteen original states as a foreign country, they are similar in how they attempt to separate the American colonies from Great Britain. Both documents encouraged those living in the American colonies to join in the American Revolution and help the United States become an officially recognized nation.

=== Other Oaths in Different States ===
Each of the thirteen original states required some variation of the Oath of Fidelity and Support, usually in the form of a pledge of allegiance to their particular state, sometimes as an independent state, or to the United States as independent states. The states of Rhode Island and Massachusetts didn't require citizens to swear fealty to the state itself, allowing them to simply affirm their support of the American Revolutionary War.

Eleven of the thirteen original states required signers to renounce their loyalty to the throne of Great Britain and anyone that would succeed King George III.

== Modern Legacy ==
Being a direct female descendant of a signer of the oath is sufficient condition to join the Daughters of the American Revolution. and the Daughters of the American Colonists.

Being a direct male descendant of a signer of the oath is sufficient condition to join the Sons of the American Revolution.
