= Philadelphia Tea Party =

1773 protest

The Philadelphia Tea Party was a political protest that took place in late December 1773, shortly after the more widely known Boston Tea Party. In response to British taxation policies and the arrival of tea shipped under the Tea Act, American colonists in Philadelphia prevented a British tea ship from unloading its cargo and forced it to return to Great Britain. The incident became one of several acts of colonial resistance that intensified tensions between Great Britain and the Thirteen Colonies in the years leading up to the American Revolutionary War.

== Background ==
Both the December 16, 1773, Boston Tea Party and the Philadelphia incident were the result of Americans being upset about Great Britain's decision to tax the American colonies despite a lack of representation in Parliament. The tax on tea particularly angered the colonists, so they boycotted English tea for several years, during which time merchants in several colonial cities resorted to smuggling tea from The Netherlands. It was generally known that Philadelphia merchants were greater smugglers of tea than their Boston counterparts.

As a result, the East India Company appealed for financial relief to the British government, which passed the Tea Act on May 10, 1773. This Act of Parliament allowed the East India Company to sell tea to the colonies directly and without "payment of any customs or duties whatsoever" in England, instead paying the much lower American duty. The resulting tax break allowed East India to sell tea for half the old price and cheaper than the price of tea in Great Britain, enabling the firm to undercut prices offered by colonial merchants and smugglers.

The Tea Act infuriated colonials precisely because it was designed to lower the price of tea without officially repealing the tea tax of the Revenue Act of 1767. And colonial leaders thought the British were trying to use cheap tea to "overcome all the patriotism of an American," in the words of Benjamin Franklin.

== Prelude ==
Word was received in North America by September, 1773, that East India Company tea shipments were on their way. Philadelphians held a town meeting on October 16 at the Pennsylvania State House, now known as Independence Hall. This meeting was organized by Dr. Benjamin Rush, Colonel William Bradford, Thomas Mifflin, Dr. Thomas Cadwalader, and other local leaders and members of the Philadelphia Sons of Liberty. They adopted eight resolutions, one of which stated: "That the duty imposed by Parliament upon tea landed in America is a tax on the Americans, or levying contributions on them without their consent." The most important one read:

That the resolution lately entered into by the East India Company, to send out their tea to America subject to the payment of duties on its being landed here, is an open attempt to enforce the ministerial plan, and a violent attack upon the liberties of America.

Printed in The Pennsylvania Gazette, these declarations comprised the first public protest against the importation of taxed tea from England.

In Boston three weeks later, a town meeting at Faneuil Hall declared, "That the sense of this town cannot be better expressed than in the words of certain judicious resolves, lately entered into by our worthy brethren, the citizens of Philadelphia." Indeed, Bostonians adopted the same resolutions that Philadelphians had promulgated earlier. The Boston Tea Party followed just a few weeks later, on December 16, 1773.

== Event ==
On December 25, 1773, the British tea ship Polly sailed up the Delaware River and reached Chester, Pennsylvania. Commanded by one Captain Ayres, the ship carried 697 chests of tea consigned to the Philadelphia Quaker firm of James & Drinker. Several Philadelphia gentlemen proceeded to intercept the Polly and escorted Ayres to the city. Two days later, there was a mass meeting of 8,000 Philadelphians in the State House yard to address the situation. This was the largest crowd assembled in the American colonies up to that point. A number of resolutions were adopted, the first one being "that the tea... shall not be landed." It was further determined that the tea should be refused and that the vessel should make its way down the Delaware River and out of the Delaware Bay as soon as possible.

Captain Ayres was probably influenced by a broadside issued by the self-constituted "Committee for Tarring and Feathering" that plainly warned him of his fate should he attempt to unload his ship's cargo. Dated November 27, the handbill read, in part:

You are sent out on a diabolical Service; and if you are so foolish and obstinate as to complete your Voyage, by bringing your Ship to Anchor in this Port, you may run such a Gauntlet as will induce you, in your last Moments, most heartily to curse those who have made you the Dupe of their Avarice and Ambition.

What think you, Captain, of a Halter around your Neck—ten Gallons of liquid Tar decanted on your Pate—with the Feathers of a dozen wild Geese laid over that to enliven your Appearance?

Only think seriously of this—and fly to the Place from whence you came—fly without Hesitation—without the Formality of a Protest—and above all, Captain Ayres, let us advise you to fly without the wild Geese Feathers.

The flyer also warned river pilots that they would receive the same treatment if they tried to bring in the Polly. (Another such broadside specifically warning river pilots was later issued on December 7.) Consignees of the tea would also suffer dire consequences if they accepted shipment. Captain Ayres was ushered to the Arch Street Wharf and from there returned to his ship. He then refitted the Polly with food and water and sailed it back to Britain, still laden with its cargo of tea.

Perhaps due to the Quaker influence in Philadelphia, the Philadelphia Tea Party was comparatively nonviolent, resulting in no loss of any innocent merchants, since no tea was destroyed. In fact, local merchants may have even helped Captain Ayres with his expenses in returning to England.

== Influence ==
Restrained as it was compared to Boston's, the Philadelphia Tea Party was one of the incidents that led to the calling of the Continental Congress at Carpenters' Hall in Philadelphia the following September, which passed the Continental Association on October 20. Furthermore, in 1809, Dr. Benjamin Rush wrote to John Adams:

I once heard you say [that] the active business of the American Revolution began in Philadelphia in the act of her citizens in sending back the tea ship, and that Massachusetts would have received her portion of the tea had not our example encouraged her to expect union and support in destroying it... The flame kindled on that day [October 16, 1773] soon extended to Boston and gradually spread throughout the whole continent. It was the first throe of that convulsion which delivered Great Britain of the United States.

Both Pennsylvania and Philadelphia were regarded as having been far more conservative before and during the Revolutionary War than the New England colonies and most of the Southern colonies. But the Philadelphia Tea Party highlights that the radicals of Philadelphia and Pennsylvania played a much more active role in the American Revolution than generally acknowledged.

== Footnotes ==
- William C. Kashatus, Historic Philadelphia: The City, Symbols & Patriots, 1681-1800 (McFarland & Co., 1992), at 14.
- Edward S. Gifford Jr., The American Revolution in the Delaware Valley (Philadelphia: Pennsylvania Soc. of Sons of the Revolution, 1976), at 21–22.
- Robert H. Wilson, Philadelphia: Official Handbook for Visitors (New York: C.S. Hammond & Co., 1964), at 56.
- Francis Burke Brandt, The Majestic Delaware: The Nation's Foremost Historic River (Philadelphia: Brandt & Gummere Co., 1929), at 103.
