= Thomas Swann (disambiguation) =

Thomas Swann (1809–1883) was the governor of Maryland, U.S.A.

Thomas Swann may also refer to:

- Thomas Swann (attorney), lawyer who served as United States Attorney for the District of Columbia from 1821 to 1833
- Thomas Swann (councillor), planter and tavernkeeper who served in both houses of the colonial Virginia General Assembly
- Thomas Burnett Swann (1928–1976), American poet, critic and fantasy author
- Thomas Swann (rower) (born 1987), Australian rower

== See also ==
- Thomas Swan (disambiguation)
