= 1861 Maryland gubernatorial election =

- November 6, 1861
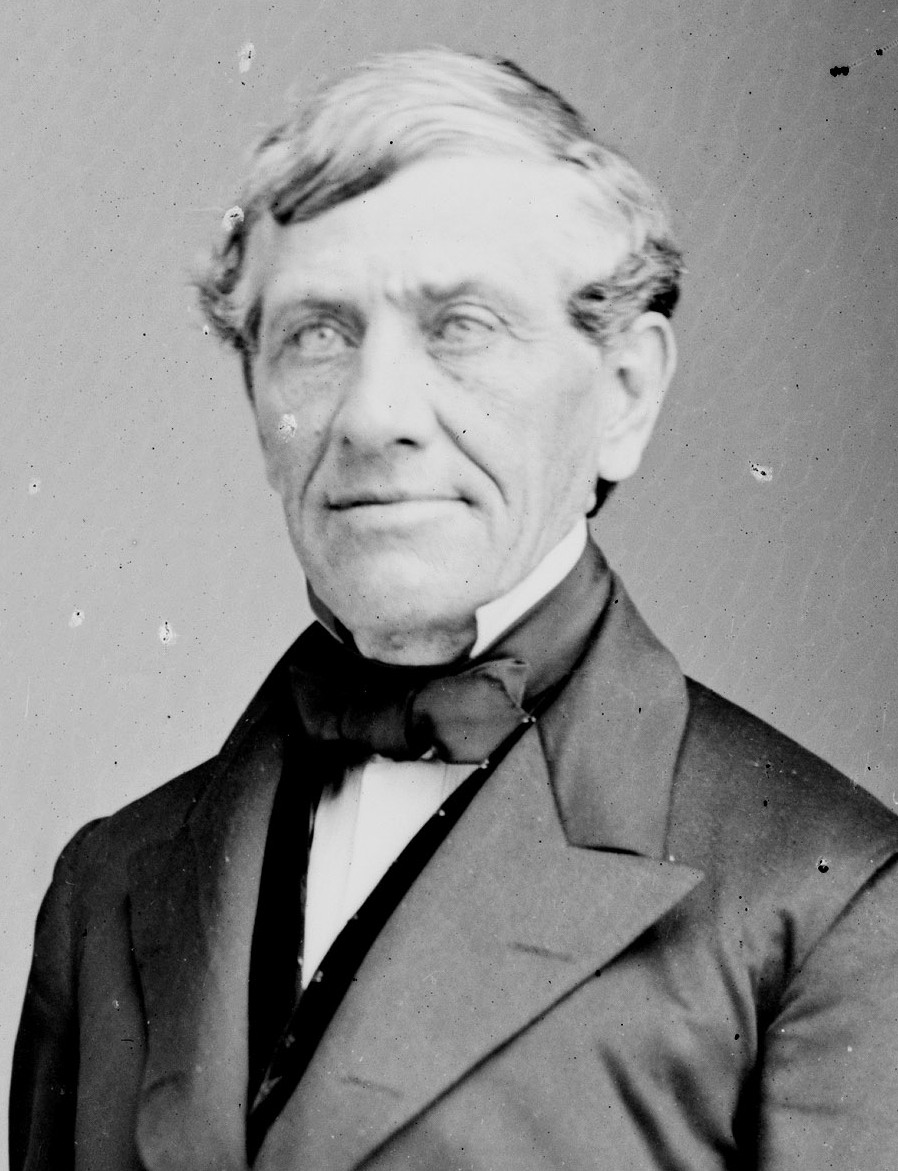

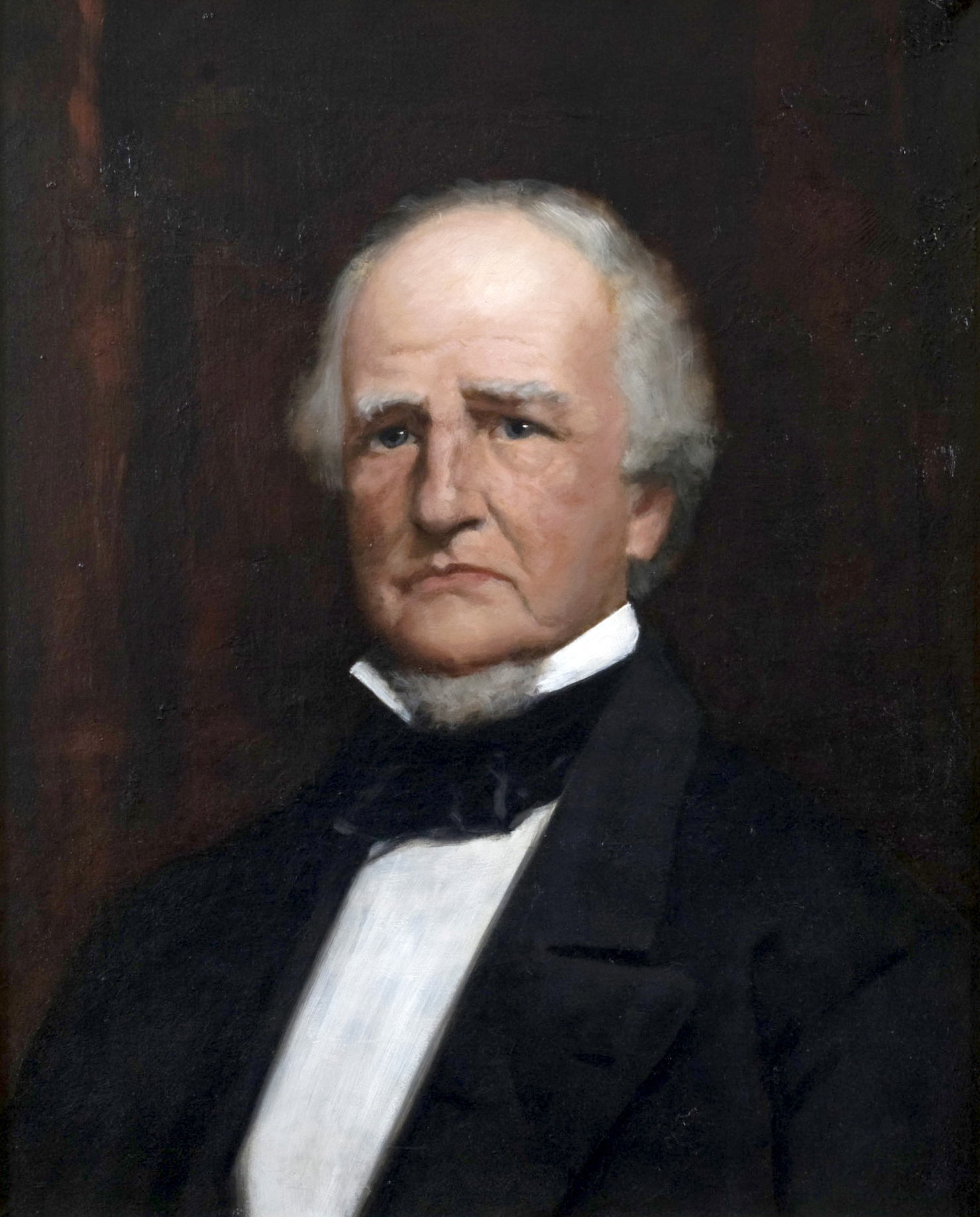
Nominee	Augustus Bradford	Benjamin Chew Howard
Party	Union	Democratic
Popular vote	57,472	26,045
Percentage	68.81%	31.19%
- County results Bradford: 50–60% 60–70% 70–80% 80–90% Howard: 50–60% 60–70% 70–80% 80–90%
Governor before election
Thomas Holliday Hicks
Know Nothing
Elected Governor
Augustus Bradford
Union

The 1861 Maryland gubernatorial election took place on November 6, 1861. It was held amid the early phases of the American Civil War and was contested between the Union Party's Augustus Bradford and the Democratic Party's Benjamin Chew Howard. Bradford supported the maintenance of the Union while Howard advocated for a peace treaty with the Confederacy. Concerned about pro-secession elements in the state, the federal government sent troops to supervise the vote and ordered electors to take an oath of loyalty to the Union. The election was won by Bradford with 68.8% of the votes.

== Format ==
The previous elections had been held in 1857 and had seen Thomas Holliday Hicks of the American Party defeat the Democratic Party's John Charles Groome by 8,400 votes.

Gubernatorial elections in Maryland were held on the first Wednesday in November for a four-year term. The sitting governor could not stand for election. The state was split into three districts: Eastern consisting of Caroline, Cecil, Dorchester, Kent, Queen Anne's, Somerset, Talbot and Worcester counties; Southern consisting of Anne Arundel, Calvert, Charles, Montgomery, Prince George's and St. Mary's counties plus the city of Baltimore and Northwestern consisting of Allegany, Baltimore, Carroll, Frederick, Harford and Washington counties. The candidates had to come from a specified district, in rotation for the 1861 election this was the Southern District. The 1861 election was held on November 6.

== Candidates ==
The election was between two candidates, Augustus Bradford for the Union Party and Benjamin Chew Howard for the Democratic Party. Bradford was a former Whig Party member and a strong Southern Unionist. He had the support of Hicks, who had appointed him as a delegate to the February 1861 Washington Peace Conference, a last-minute attempt to prevent the Southern states seceding and starting the American Civil War (which began in April).

Howard was a former brigadier-general and four-time member of congress for the Jacksonians and (from 1835) the Democrats. He had been Reporter of Decisions of the Supreme Court of the United States since 1843 and had also attended the peace conference. Howard stood on a platform of peace with the Confederacy and was described by the Jeffersonian Democrat as a "Secession Democrat".

== Federal intervention ==
Ahead of the election US President Abraham Lincoln had, based on intelligence from General George McClellan, ordered the arrest of more than 24 members of the Maryland legislature who were suspected of holding secessionist sympathies. Ahead of the election it was reported in the press that pro-Confederate bands were conspiring to deny access to the polls by Unionists to secure a Democrat victory. McClellan ordered Major-General John Adams Dix to intervene with federal troops to police the Eastern Shore during the election. Dix's men were in position from November 4. He ordered Eastern Shore judges not to allow any man who had participated in the Baltimore riot of 1861 or who refused, when challenged, to take an oath of loyalty to the government to vote. In Baltimore city more than 200 arrests were made on election day for "treasonous conduct", though the majority of these men were later released.

== Results ==
All as per Dubin (2010). In 1860 Maryland had a total population of 687,049. This included 87,189 slaves and 303,275 free women who were not entitled to vote and 148,999 free males under the age of 20 (until the 1971 Twenty-sixth Amendment to the United States Constitution the voting age was generally 21).

1861 Maryland gubernatorial election
Party	Candidate	Votes	%	±%
Union	Augustus Bradford	57,472	68.81	
Democratic	Benjamin Chew Howard	26,045	31.19	
Majority		31,427	37.62	
Turnout		83,517		
Union hold		Swing		

County	Bradford		Howard	
County	Votes	%	Votes	%
Allegany	3,025	70.0	1,297	30.0
Anne Arundel	1,037	50.8	1,004	49.2
Baltimore	4,619	67.4	2,235	32.8
Baltimore City	17,817	84.1	2,261	15.9
Calvert	319	39.4	489	60.6
Caroline	1,076	66.3	548	33.7
Carroll	3,405	69.1	1,522	30.9
Cecil	3,062	73.7	1,092	26.3
Charles	239	26.5	664	73.5
Dorchester	1,441	69.3	639	30.7
Frederick	5,326	69.6	2,323	30.4
Harford	2,200	57.4	1,631	42.6
Howard	999	60.8	644	39.2
Kent	1,095	62.3	663	37.7
Montgomery	1,320	64.7	720	35.3
Prince George's	894	54.1	760	45.9
Queen Anne's	1,034	52.4	939	47.6
St. Mary's	207	15.9	1,094	84.1
Somerset	1,830	64.7	997	35.3
Talbot	905	50.0	906	50.0
Washington	4,200	77.5	1,222	22.5
Worcester	1,422	52.3	1,295	47.7

== Later events ==
Having won the election Bradford took office in January 1862. His governorship came at a difficult time. He had to manage the balancing of the rights of his state against increasing federal government demands, manage the pro-secession sentiment in part of the state and deal with Confederate invasions of its territory, including one in summer 1864 that burnt his house. Though Bradford had benefited from the federal government's intervention in the 1861 election he opposed their involvement in the 1863 elections for offices in his state. He argued unsuccessfully with Lincoln that Union General Robert Schenck's Order No. 53, which required Union army provost marshals to assist in administering an oath of loyalty to voters and to report election supervisors who refused to administer the oath, should be revoked. Bradford claimed that the presence of Union soldiers near polling stations in the 1863 vote stifled "the freedom of election in a faithful state". Bradford supported the emancipation of slaves in the United States and helped establish a new constitution in Maryland in 1864 that outlawed slavery.

Various changes to the format of the poll were brought in for the 1864 Maryland gubernatorial election (which was held earlier than required) and subsequent votes. The date was fixed as the first Tuesday after the first Monday in November and the restriction on sitting governors being re-elected was lifted, as was the requirement for the governor to represent a specified district. The 1864 election was won by the Unionist candidate Thomas Swann, though he did not assume office until January 1866, allowing Bradford to sit a full four-year term.
