= Blair Lee III =

American politician (1916–1985)

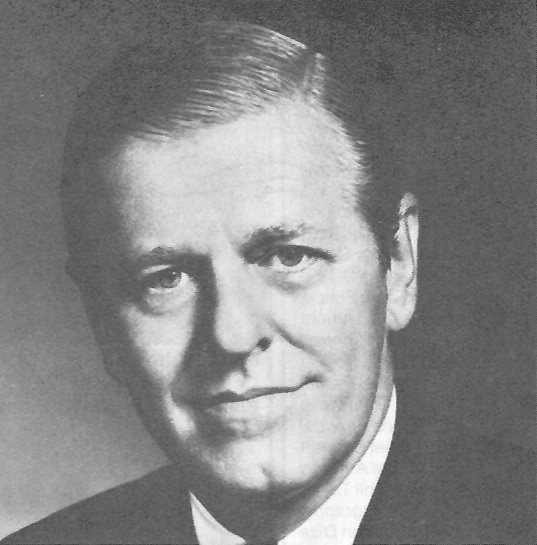
- Lee as acting governor in 1977

Acting Governor of Maryland
- In office June 4, 1977 – January 15, 1979
- Governor: Marvin Mandel

2nd Lieutenant Governor of Maryland
- In office January 20, 1971 – January 17, 1979
- Governor: Marvin Mandel
- Preceded by: Christopher C. Cox (1868)
- Succeeded by: Samuel Bogley

15th Chair of the National Lieutenant Governors Association
- In office 1975
- Preceded by: Julian Carroll
- Succeeded by: Eugene Bookhammer

60th Secretary of State of Maryland
- In office January 7, 1969 – January 20, 1971
- Governor: Marvin Mandel
- Preceded by: C. Stanley Blair
- Succeeded by: Fred Wineland

Personal details
- Born: Francis Preston Blair Lee III; May 19, 1916 Silver Spring, Maryland, U.S.
- Died: October 25, 1985 (aged 69) Silver Spring, Maryland, U.S.
- Resting place: Rock Creek Cemetery; Washington, D.C., U.S.
- Party: Democratic
- Spouse: Mimi Boal
- Relatives: Lee family
- Education: Princeton University (BA); George Washington University

Francis Preston Blair Lee III (May 19, 1916 – October 25, 1985) was an American politician who served as the second lieutenant governor of Maryland from 1971 to 1979 and served as acting governor of Maryland from 1977 to 1979, during Marvin Mandel's self-imposed suspension of gubernatorial powers and duties. He served as secretary of State of Maryland from 1969 to 1971 and was a member of the Democratic Party.

== Early life, family and career ==
Lee was born in Silver Spring, Maryland, the son of Elizabeth S. (Wilson) and Colonel Edward Brooke Lee, the former Comptroller of the state of Maryland (chief financial officer). He was a member of the Lee family, a major historical political family in American history. He was grandson of the first popularly elected Maryland U.S. Senator, Blair Lee I; direct descendant of signer of the Declaration of Independence, Richard Henry Lee and also Francis Preston Blair, an adviser and friend of Andrew Jackson, Martin Van Buren, and Abraham Lincoln.

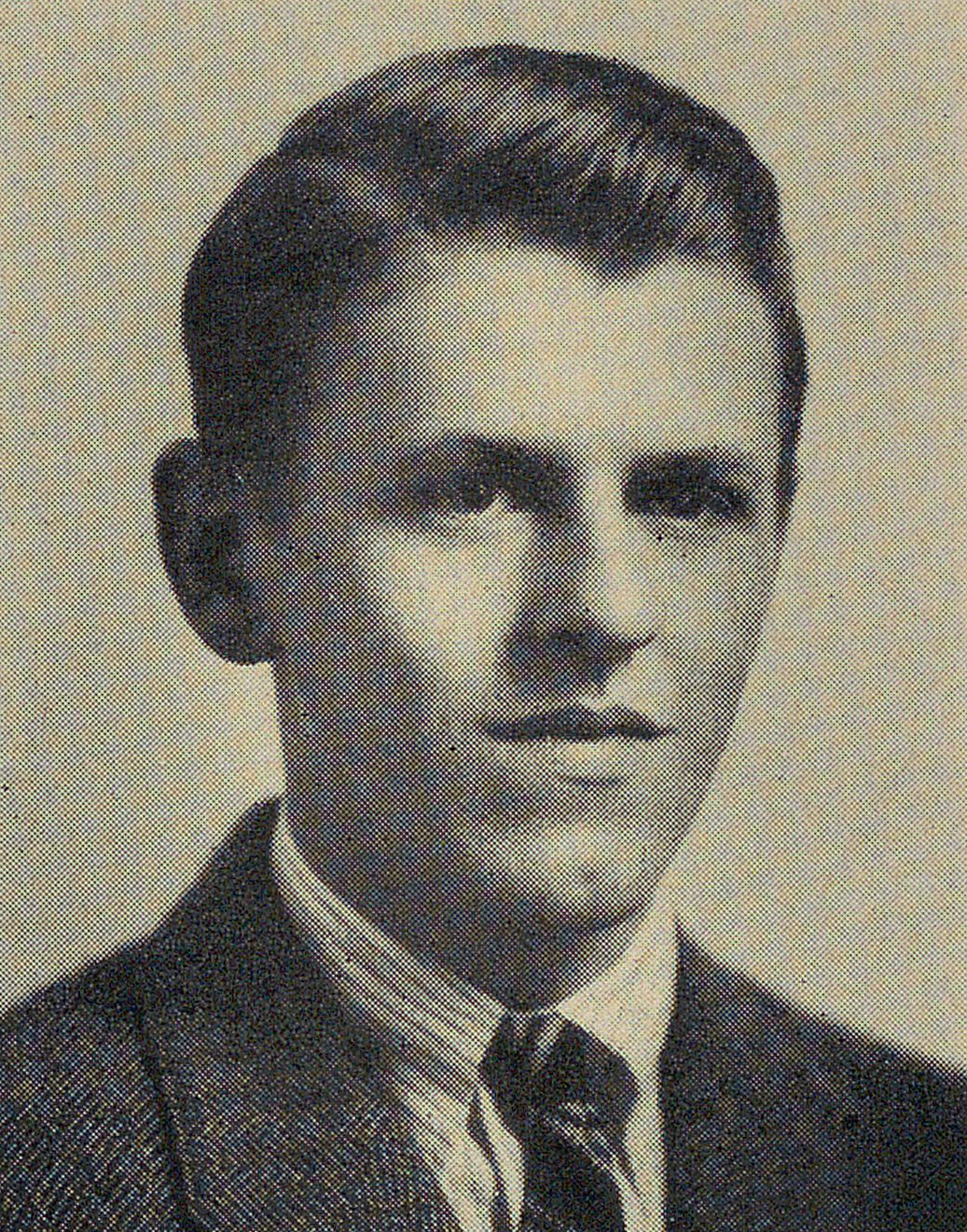
Lee in the Princeton University yearbook, 1938

Lee majored in American history at Princeton University, where he graduated with a bachelor's degree in 1938. His thesis, "The Free Soil Movement in the 1840s", was based on correspondences between his ancestors and Presidents, cabinet members, and others from his family's private collection. After spending time studying law at The George Washington University, the entry of the United States into World War II in 1941 resulted in Lee joining the United States Navy Reserve. He spent the War working on supply ships in the Atlantic Ocean. It was also during the War, on July 6, 1944, that he married Mathilde Boal with whom he would have eight children. After four years of service, Lee was discharged with the rank of lieutenant commander in 1945.

After the War, Lee began work as a newspaper journalist. He worked as an editor for his father's newspaper, the Maryland News, and also served as President of the Maryland Press Association and Silver Spring Board of Trade in 1949. Lee also pursued environmental interests in government, serving as Vice Chairman and Park Commissioner of the Maryland-National Capital Park and Planning Commission (MNCPPC) until 1951, and Executive Officer of the National Capital Planning Commission from 1951 to 1954.

== Maryland political career ==
Lee entered politics shortly after the end of the Second World War, serving as delegate to the Democratic National Convention in 1948, and later in 1960 and 1964. He was elected to the Maryland House of Delegates in 1954, and served until 1962, when he made an unsuccessful bid for the United States Senate. In the House, Lee served as chairman of the Montgomery County delegation, and was chosen in 1958 by the Maryland Legislative Correspondents Association as "Legislator of the Year" for his efforts in resolving a crisis that emerged between the Maryland General Assembly and the Maryland State Teacher's Association.

In presidential politics, Lee served as campaign manager for John F. Kennedy's 1960 presidential bid in Montgomery County, and in 1964 as regional coordinator for the Lyndon B. Johnson campaign.

In 1966, Lee entered the Maryland State Senate, where he served on the Finance Committee as vice chairman and in the Legislative Council. He was chosen Secretary of State of Maryland by Governor Marvin Mandel in 1969.

== Lieutenant Governor and Acting Governor ==
Following the amendment of the Constitution of Maryland in 1970, the office of Lieutenant Governor of Maryland was created, and voters chose Lee to serve in that position. During his tenure as Lt. Governor, Lee served on various committees and commissions established by the Governor. Also as Lt. Governor, Lee helped prepare the budget, determine policy actions, and served as chairman of the Governor's Cabinet, as well as Governor's Chief of Staff.

The most notable moment of Lee's career occurred when Governor Mandel designated Lee as Acting Governor of Maryland, effective with a letter dated June 4, 1977, per Article 2, Section 6b, of the Maryland Constitution of 1867. Mandel's decision was the result of a stroke, as well as federal political corruption charges that were linked to some $200,000 in gifts received. Lee continued to serve as Acting Governor until Mandel rescinded his letter on January 15, 1979, though Mandel briefly reinstated Lee as acting governor the next day so he would be able to preside over the appointment of a judge to the Maryland Court of Appeals.

Even with the added boost of serving as acting governor, Lee was not able to overcome the severe damage the Mandel Administration had taken as a result of the corruption trial. He unexpectedly lost his attempt for election in the Democratic primary to Harry R. Hughes, who would later win the general election and succeed Mandel as governor in 1979. Lee stated a few days after the loss that he was relieved of a burden, and that it was a "luxurious feeling" coming upon problems that he would not have to worry about. However, acquaintances and staff members commented that he seemed melancholic and deflated. Many of his staff shared the same feelings, since the loss was unexpected and most did not have any contingency plans.

== Later years and legacy ==
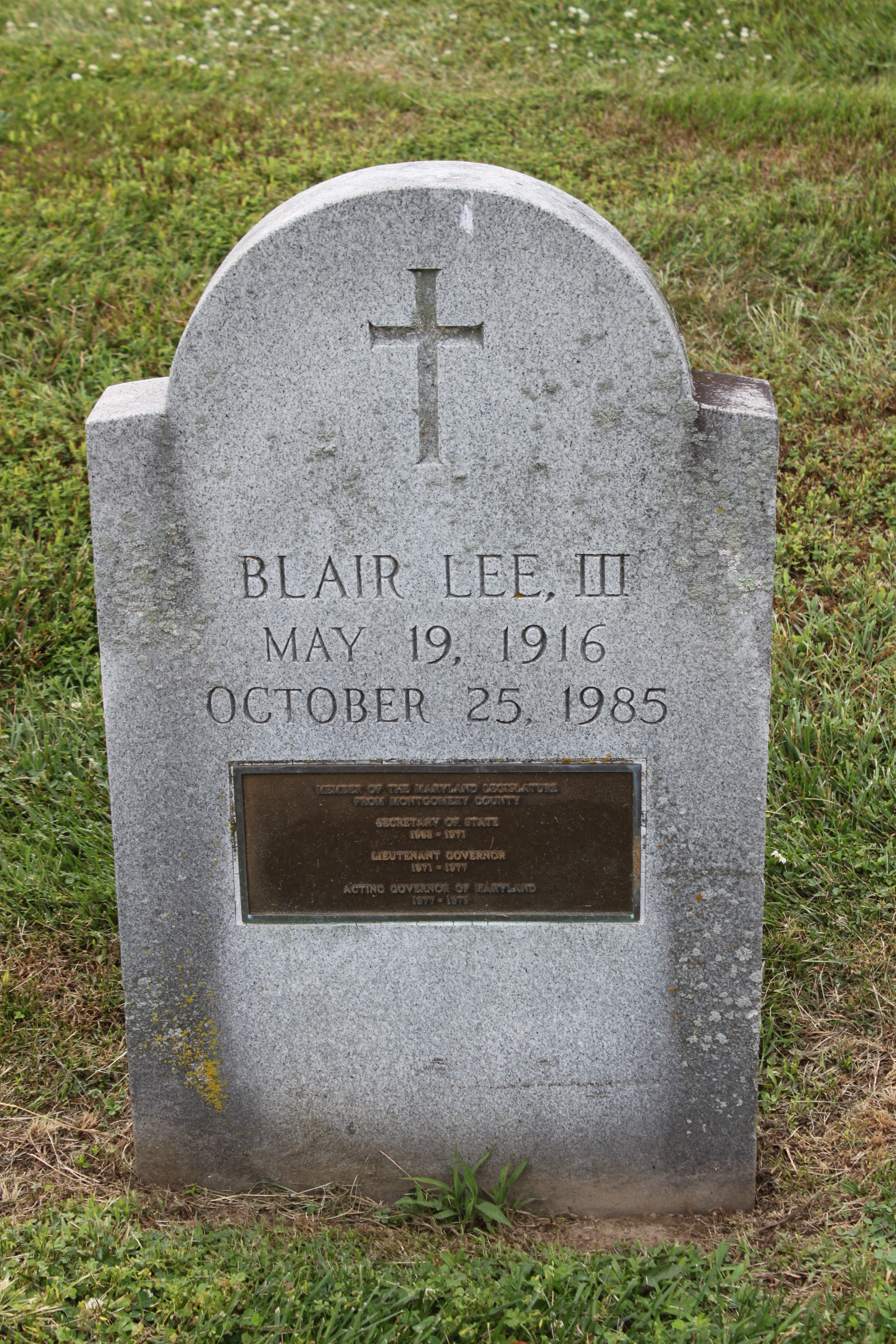
Lee's grave at Rock Creek Cemetery

In 1980, Lee was appointed to the University of Maryland, College Park Board of Regents, where he served until his death from cancer at his home in Silver Spring on October 25, 1985. After his death, commentators remarked that Lee was an able governor, but a modest politician who was not comfortable working in crowds and did not adequately distance himself from the corruption of Mandel and Mandel's predecessor, Spiro Agnew. Lee was also damaged by family troubles, which included the suicide of one of his sons in 1973. Nevertheless, Lee was praised by the media for his eloquence, honesty, and capable administrative skills. He is buried in Rock Creek Cemetery in Washington, D.C.

Political offices
Preceded by C. Stanley Blair	Secretary of State of Maryland; 1969–1971	Succeeded by Fred Wineland
Vacant Title last held by Christopher C. Cox	Lieutenant Governor of Maryland; 1971–1979	Succeeded by Samuel Bogley
Preceded by Marvin Mandel	Governor of Maryland; Acting; 1977–1979	Succeeded by Marvin Mandel
