= Christopher Christian Cox =

American politician (1816–1882)

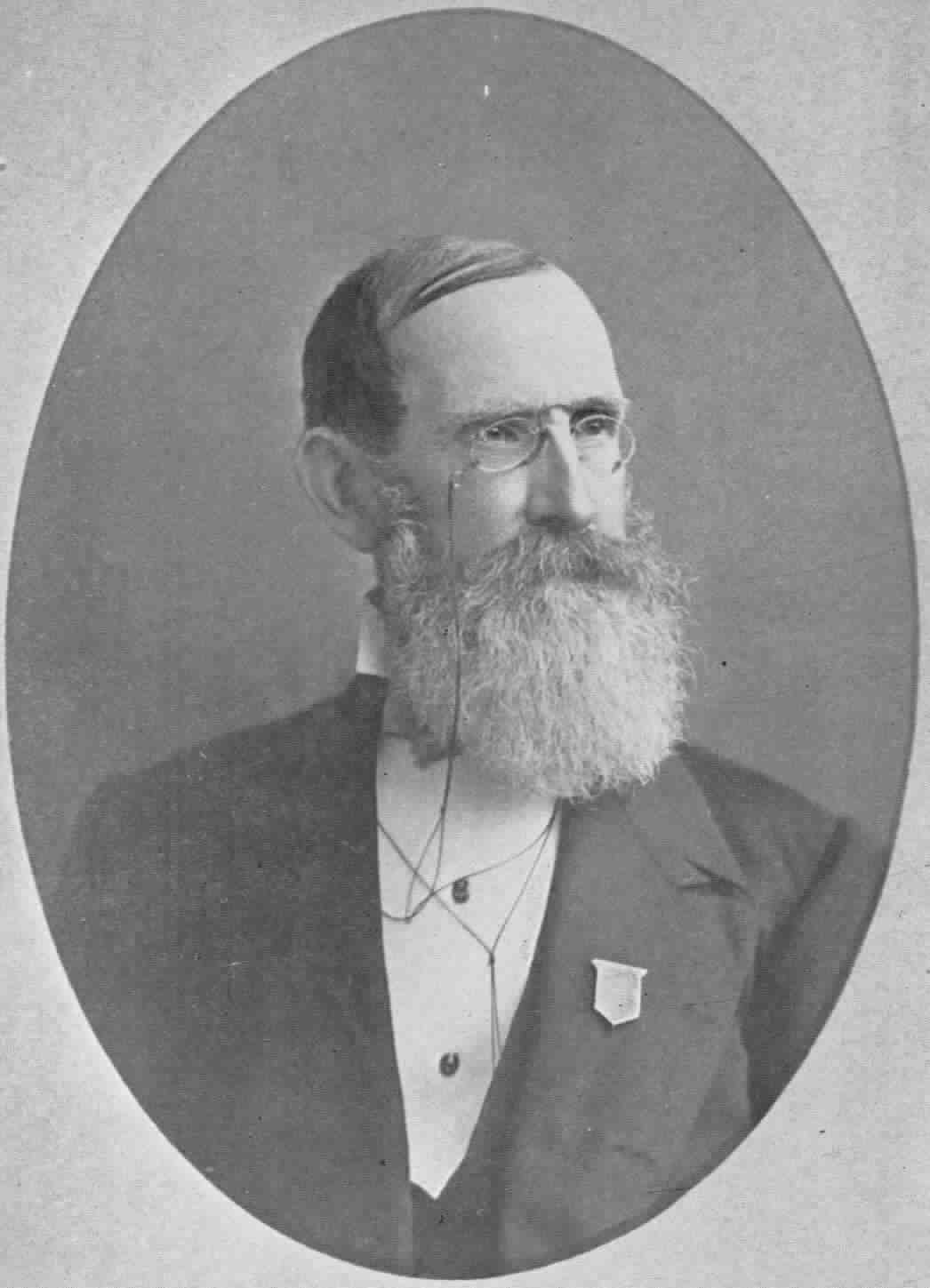

1st Lieutenant Governor of Maryland
- In office 1865–1868
- Governor: Augustus Bradford; Thomas Swann
- Preceded by: Office established
- Succeeded by: Office abolished Blair Lee III (1971)

Personal details
- Born: August 28, 1816 Baltimore, Maryland
- Died: November 25, 1882 (aged 66) Washington, D.C., U.S.
- Resting place: Easton, Maryland, U.S.
- Party: National Union Party
- Profession: surgeon, professor

Christopher Christian Cox (August 28, 1816 – November 25, 1882) was an American politician, surgeon and professor who served as the first lieutenant governor of Maryland.

== Biography ==
Born in Baltimore, Cox was a member of the National Union Party, a coalition of Democrats loyal to the Union and Republicans during the Civil War. He received a Bachelor of Arts from Yale in 1835 and a Master of Arts thereafter. He graduated from Washington Medical College with a Doctor of Medicine degree in 1838 and began practicing in Baltimore. He moved to practice in Easton in 1843.

He was Professor of Medical Jurisprudence at the Philadelphia College of Medicine from 1848 to 1849 and became Professor of Obstetrics and Diseases of Women and Children in 1849. In 1857 and 1857 Cox was president of the Medical and Chirurgical Faculty of Maryland. In 1861 he became a surgeon in the United States Army, leaving in 1862.

Cox served as the first Lieutenant Governor of Maryland from 1865 to 1868. The relatively new office was abolished in 1868 and not reinstated until 1970, when the next lieutenant governor, Blair Lee III, was elected. Re-creation of the office involved an amendment to the Maryland Constitution of 1867, which had superseded the 1864 constitution under which the office was initially established.

Trinity College conferred an LL. D. on Cox in 1867, and in 1869 became Professor of Medical Jurisprudence at Georgetown University. He was editor of the National Medical Journal in Washington, D.C. from 1870 to 1872, and also assistant editor of the Baltimore Patriot.

Cox was one of the founders of the Literary Society of Washington in 1874. An Episcopalian, he died in Washington D.C.

Political offices
Preceded by office created	Lieutenant Governor of Maryland; 1865–1868	Succeeded by Blair Lee III (1971)
