= Thomas Swann =

American politician (1809-1883)

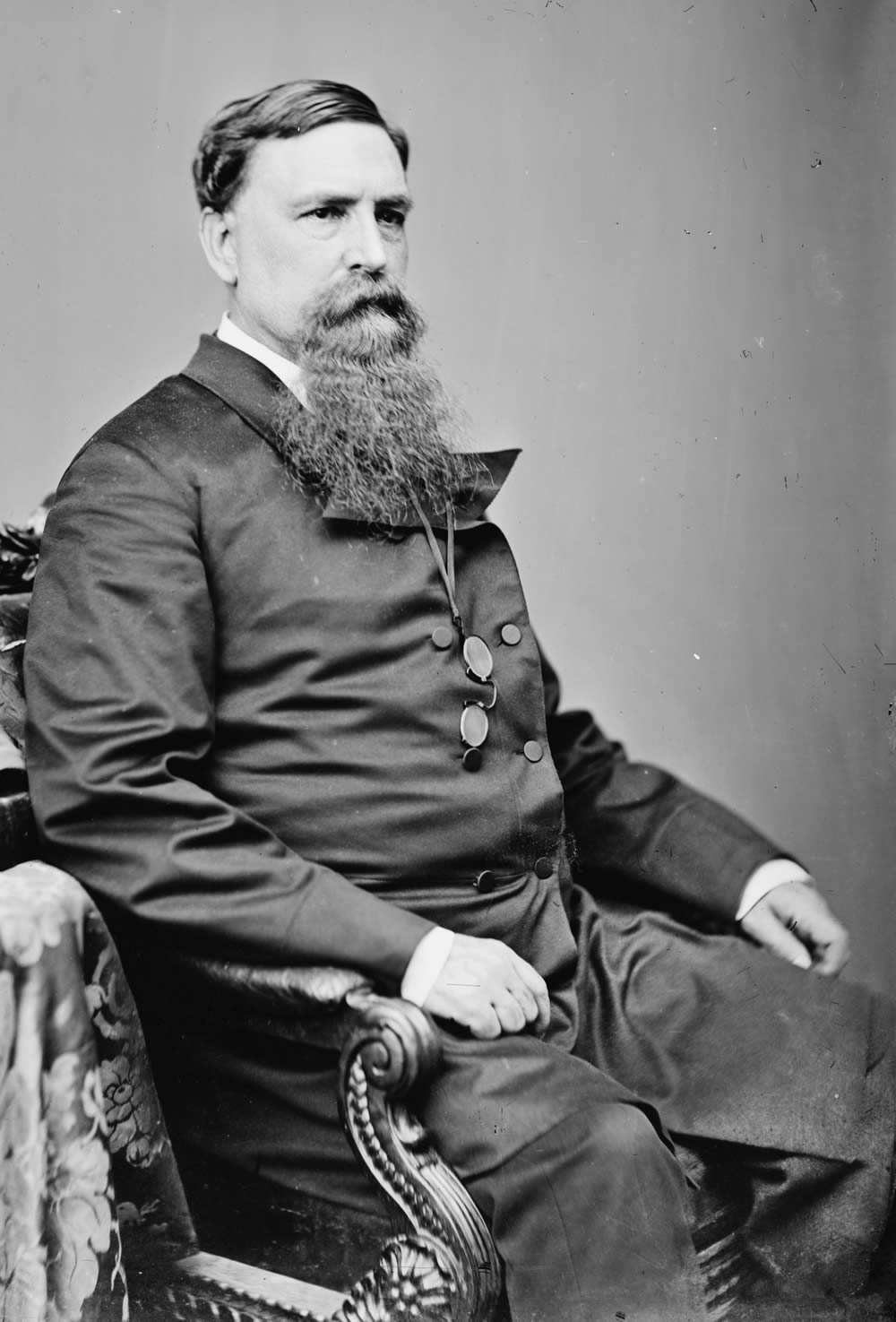

Member of the U.S. House of Representatives from Maryland
- In office March 4, 1869 – March 3, 1879
- Preceded by: Charles E. Phelps (3rd); John Ritchie (4th)
- Succeeded by: William J. O'Brien (3rd); Robert M. McLane (4th)
- Constituency: 3rd district (1869-73); 4th district (1873-79)

33rd Governor of Maryland
- In office January 10, 1866 – January 13, 1869
- Lieutenant: Christopher C. Cox
- Preceded by: Augustus Bradford
- Succeeded by: Oden Bowie

19th Mayor of Baltimore
- In office November 10, 1856 – November 12, 1860
- Preceded by: Samuel Hinks
- Succeeded by: George William Brown

Personal details
- Born: February 3, 1809 Alexandria, Virginia, U.S.
- Died: July 24, 1883 (aged 74) Leesburg, Virginia, U.S.
- Resting place: Green Mount Cemetery
- Party: American (1856–1860); Union (1861–1866); Democratic (1866–1879)
- Education: The George Washington University
- Profession: Politician

Thomas Swann (February 3, 1809 – July 24, 1883) was an American lawyer and politician who also was president of the Baltimore and Ohio Railroad as it completed track to Wheeling and gained access to the Ohio River Valley. Initially a Know-Nothing, and later a Democrat, Swann served as the 19th mayor of Baltimore (1856–1860), later as the 33rd governor of Maryland (1866–1869), and subsequently as the U.S. representative from Maryland's 3rd congressional district and then 4th congressional district (1869–1879), representing the Baltimore area.

== Early life and career ==
Swann was born in Alexandria, Virginia, the fourth son born to Jane Byrd Page, a member of one of the First Families of Virginia. His mother died three years later after a difficult childbirth. His attorney father, Thomas Swann, had served in the Virginia House of Delegates and with political connections to William Wirt and other Virginia lawyers in the national government, would become United States Attorney for the District of Columbia during this man's childhood. Although two of his brothers died between 1825 and 1829, Swann's elder brother Wilson Cary Swann (1806-1876) was educated with him and later rose to prominence as a physician, philanthropist, and social reformer in Philadelphia.

The Swann brothers attended Columbian College (now George Washington University) in Washington, D.C., then the University of Virginia at Charlottesville. Thomas Jr. studied Ancient and modern languages and mathematics, but was also disciplined for disorderly conduct in 1825 and questioned in a gambling scandal the following year, which may have led him to enroll in a class in moral philosophy from prominent Virginia lawyer George Tucker. He also studied law under his father's guidance.

== Career ==
A Democrat, in 1833 and possibly through his father's connections, Swann secured an appointment from President Andrew Jackson as secretary of the United States Commission to Naples (Kingdom of the Two Sicilies - later Italy). Also admitted to the Virginia bar, he began following his father's career path by winning election to the Alexandria City council in 1833.

In 1834, Swann married an heiress and moved to Baltimore, Maryland, where his father's lawyer friend William Wirt had settled, and where Swann later became a railroad lawyer. His bride's British born father, John Sherlock, left a sizeable estate which included interests in French and Neopolitan spoliation claims, as well as 6000 acres of Pennsylvania land, 150 ounces of silver plate, 300 bottles of madeira, plus stock in the Bank of the United States, three Baltimore banks, two turnpikes, a canal in York, Pennsylvania and the Baltimore and Ohio Railroad (which had been incorporated in 1827 and in completed track to Harper's Ferry by 1834). His wife's uncle, Robert Gilmor, secured them entry into Baltimore society, although his father experienced financial difficulties after the Panic of 1836 so young Thomas bought 600 to 700 acres of land and the Morven Park plantation home from his father, noting that his father's nemesis Nicholas Biddle likewise was forced to sell property to his sons after the panic. In 1840 the elder Thomas Swann died and this man inherited Morven Park, sixty slaves and his father's law library, and over the next years gradually purchased the rest of what had been his father's land. Meanwhile, this Thomas Swann and his family lived on Franklin Street in Baltimore, and used his late father's Virginia property Morven Park as their summer retreat.

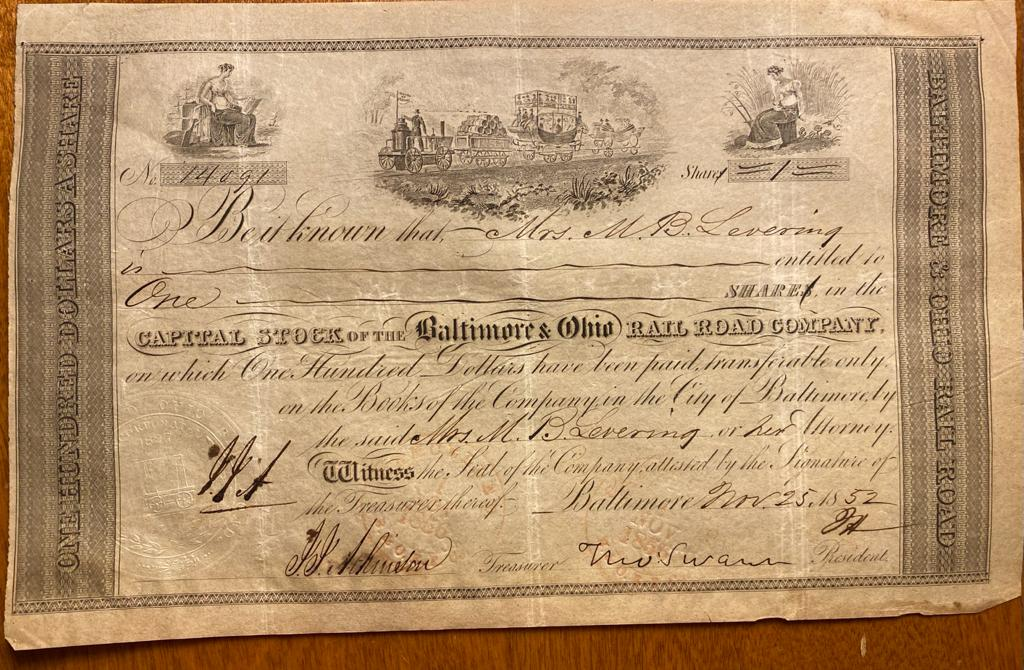
1852 B&O Railroad stock certificate signed in original by Thomas Swann as President.

Swann returned to Alexandria after his father's death in 1840, but also continued as a railroad lawyer. Between 1837 and 1843 he was the assistant to Louis McLane, a veteran politician who served as the railroad's president. In 1844 Swann became Alexandria' tobacco inspector, an important responsibility in that port city which also had railroad ties both to Richmond, and (via a separate station) to Baltimore. In 1846-1847, Swann was the B&O's lobbyist in Richmond, for the franchise the railroad had secured in 1827 was expiring, and its extension through western Virginia was opposed by the powerful political interests of the James River and Kanawha Canal Company. Swann secured the extension on March 6, 1847, the railroad began building to Wheeling, and by October 1848, Swann's large stockholdings in and services to the B&O led to his election as a director, and when McLane retired, he succeeded him as the railroad's president. bY 1850, Swann raised funds in Europe to enable the B&O's extension to the Ohio River, continuing in that position until resigning in 1853. He was chosen as president of the Northwestern Virginia Railroad.

== Mayor of Baltimore ==
=== 1856 election ===
Swann was first elected Mayor of Baltimore in 1856 as a member of the "Know Nothing" movement (also known as the "American Party") in one of the bloodiest and most corrupt elections in state history. He supposedly defeated Democratic challenger Robert Clinton Wright by over a thousand votes.

Many believed that once slavery was abolished in Maryland, African Americans would begin a mass emigration to a new state. As white soldiers returned from Southern battlefields, they came home to find that not only were their slaves gone, but soil exhaustion was causing tobacco crops in southern Maryland to fail. With a growing number of disaffected white men, Swann embarked on a campaign of "Redemption" and "restoring to Maryland a white man's government".

Additionally, Swann enacted a law that encouraged white fishermen to harass black fishermen when he signed into law the state's first ever "Oyster Code": "And be it acted, that all owners and masters of canoes, boats, or vessels licensed under this article, being White Men, are hereby constituted officers of this state for the purpose of arresting and taking before any judge or Justice of the Peace, any persons who may be engaged in violating any provisions of this article. Furthermore, all such owners and masters are hereby vested with the power to summon posse comitatus to aid in such arrest."

Although Maryland was still a "slave state" at the time, the Emancipation Proclamation did not apply to it, because it was a non-Confederate state, having officially remained in the Union; President Lincoln feared that ending slavery there at the height of the Civil War would cause Maryland to leave the Union. Hence, ending slavery there required a state-level referendum. When slavery there was abolished with the adoption of the third Maryland Constitution of 1864, Lincoln's fears were not realized; the war finished without Maryland ever defecting to the Confederacy, although many men from southern Maryland counties and the "Eastern Shore" did fight on the side of the Confederacy.

During the mid-1850s, public order in Baltimore City had often been threatened by the election of candidates of the "Know Nothing" movement which became known as the "American Party". In October 1856 the "Know Nothing" previous incumbent Mayor Samuel Hinks was pressed by Baltimoreans to order the Maryland State Militia in readiness to maintain order during the mayoral and municipal elections, as violence was anticipated. Hinks duly gave State Militia general George H. Steuart the order, but he soon rescinded it. As a result, violence broke out on polling day, with shots exchanged by competing mobs. In the 2nd and 8th Wards several citizens were killed, and many wounded. In the 6th ward artillery was used, and a pitched battle fought on Orleans Street in East Baltimore/Jonestown/Old Town neighborhoods between "Know Nothings" and rival Democrats, raging for several hours. The result of the election, in which voter fraud was widespread, was a victory for Swann by around 9,000 votes.

=== 1857 election ===
In 1857, fearing similar violence at the upcoming elections, Governor Thomas W. Ligon ordered commanding General George H. Steuart of the Maryland State Militia to hold the First Light Division, Maryland Volunteers in readiness. Swann's ally, Know-Nothing Congressman Henry Winter Davis, criticized Ligon's action both for subverting local authority and as an attempt to swing the election to the Democrats. Mayor Swann, this time running for re-election, successfully argued for a compromise measure involving special police forces to prevent disorder, and Steuart's militia were stood down. This time, although there was less violence than in 1856, the results of the vote were again compromised, and the "Know-Nothings" took many state offices in the heavily disputed balloting.

=== 1858 election ===
He was re-elected in 1858, again with widespread violence prevalent, and won by over 19,000 votes due to a large amount of voter intimidation.

There were a great deal of internal improvements and urban modernizations during Swann's tenure as mayor. The long-time colonial-era various in-fighting problems and competitive volunteer independent firefighting companies since 1763 (under a loose confederation of the "Baltimore City United Fire Department" of 1835) were replaced in 1858 with paid professional firefighters with the organization of the modern current Baltimore City Fire Department, and were given steam-powered fire engines and a better emergency telegraph alarm system. His office also oversaw the creation of the horse-drawn streetcar system in Baltimore replacing the older omnibuses, the purchase from the Col. Nicholas Rogers estate and creation of the large tract for Druid Hill Park in 1860, overlooking the west banks of the Jones Falls. Following the municipal purchase of the former private Baltimore Water Company, (since 1804), saw the replacement of its old wooden pipes and aging inadequate infrastructure with the beginnings of two water-sewage construction projects along the upper Jones Falls. Following was the major public works project of the construction of the dam at the new Lake Roland Reservoir along with the organization of a new city water board and extension of new waterworks service into new outlying areas of the growing metropolis. The "Basin" (Baltimore Inner Harbor) was dredged at 20 feet depth during his term as governor, and several new schools were added to the city. The former constables and "City Night Watch" system from 1784 were replaced by a newly organized Baltimore City Police Department under then modern principles was established and given new uniforms, weapons and training (later placed under supervision and appointment powers of the governor in 1860 to the 1990s). To provide better street lighting, the offices of Superindendents of Lamps with the then existing gas system was created.

Violence was greatly prevalent during Swann's term as mayor, especially during election campaigns. Then Maryland Governor Thomas W. Ligon sought Swann's assistance to try to avoid "Know Nothing" riots during the 1856 Presidential elections, but little was resolved during the meeting, and continued riots ensued during the night of the election wounding and killing many. Ligon criticized Swann for not taking the necessary precautions, recalling the event as partisans "engaged; arms of all kinds were employed; and bloodshed, wounds, and death, stained the record of the day, and added another page of dishonor to the annals of the distracted city". This continued to contribute to Baltimore's oft-stated ignoble reputation and nickname of "Mobtown", acquired since the anti-war riots of 1812. Gov. Ligon did not cooperate with Mayor Swann during the state elections of 1857, and immediately imposed martial law upon Baltimore City before election day had begun. Swann was angered, and insisted this was not necessary, but, recalling the events one year earlier, Ligon refused to lift the martial law status.

== Governor of Maryland ==
In 1861, Swann left the American Party, which dissolved, and joined the wartime Union Party. In 1864, he was unanimously nominated as the 33rd Governor of Maryland during its nomination convention. He won election with lieutenant-governor running mate Christopher C. Cox by over 9,000 votes. The only governor elected under the Maryland Constitution of 1864, Swann took the oath of office on January 11, 1865, but did not enter into the duties of the office until one year later (under that constitution, the governor chosen in the November 1864 election could not assume the office until the completion of the term of his predecessor, Augustus W. Bradford, in January 1866); he served until January 1869. In his inaugural address, he encouraged reunion in the State following the American Civil War, and voiced his opposition to slavery, deeming it "a stumbling block in the way of [our] advancement".

Radical Republicans of Maryland criticized Swann for supporting the Reconstruction policies of Democratic and 17th President Andrew Johnson, and refusing to adopt their proposals. He eventually parted with the Republicans and joined the Democratic Party during his term as governor. He had strongly opposed requiring the "ironclad" loyalty oath and registration laws promoted by the Radical Republicans for former Confederates in the state.

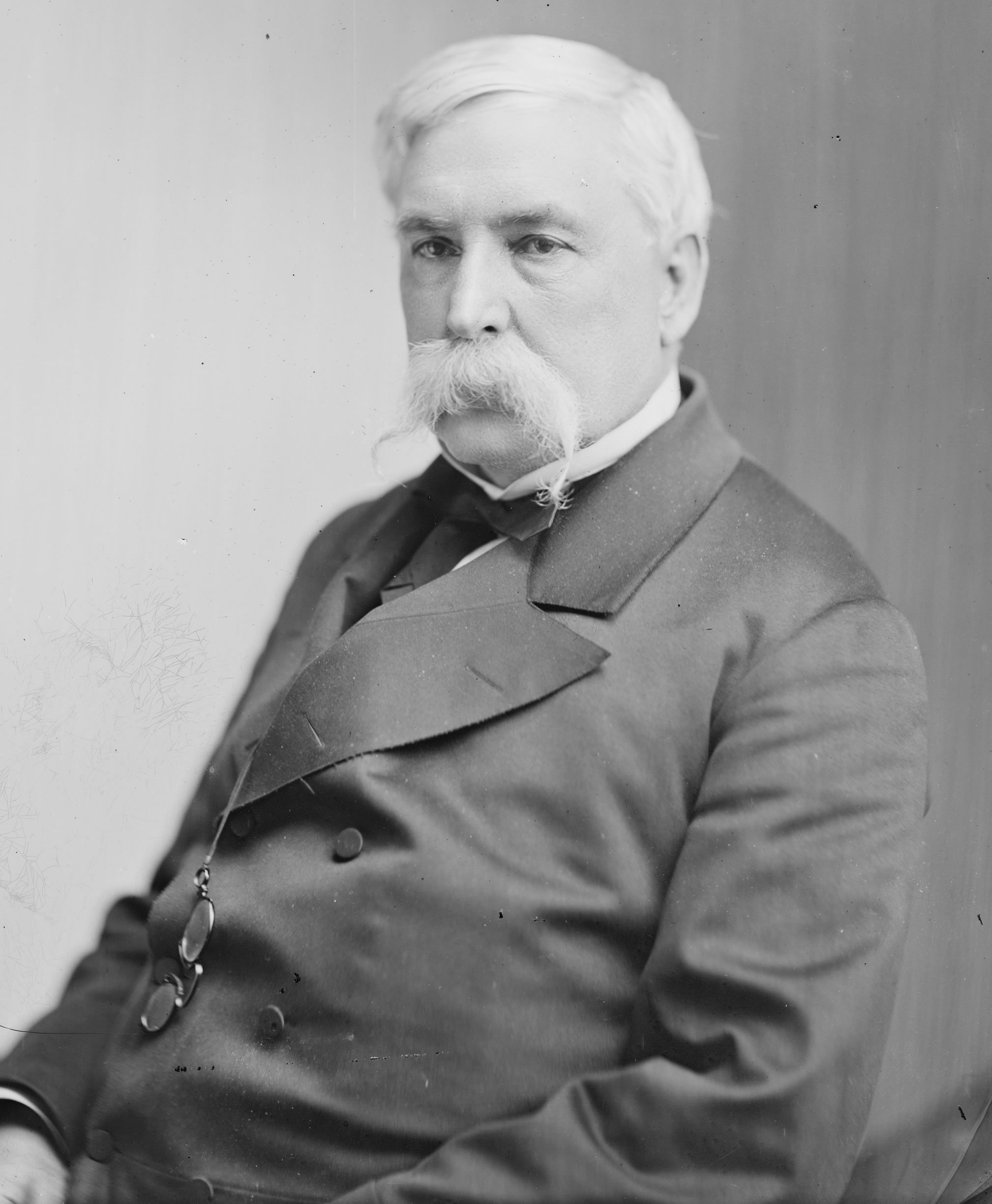
A later portrait of Mayor/Governor Thomas Swann, circa 1865-1880

In 1867, the General Assembly of Maryland nominated Swann to succeed John A. J. Creswell to the United States Senate. But, Radical Republicans had gained control of the Congress in 1867, and refused to allow Swann admission to the Senate because he had switched parties. The Democrats in Maryland began to fear that, if Swann left, the Maryland lieutenant governor, a Radical Republican, might place Maryland under a military, Reconstruction government and temporarily disfranchise whites who had served in the Confederacy. Also, they did not want to lose reforms made by Swann with other voting rights. Rather than fight the Radicals in Congress to gain a seat, Swann was convinced by Democrats to remain as governor and turn down the Senate seat.

Swann supported internal improvements to state infrastructure, especially after the war, and he is credited with greatly improving the facilities at the Baltimore Port and Harbor. He also encouraged immigration, and the immediate emancipation of slaves following the War. By 1860, 49% of blacks in Maryland were already free, giving them a substantial position and economic strength in the years following the war.

== U.S. Congressional career and final years ==
In 1868, Swann was elected to Congress from Maryland's 3rd congressional district, gaining re-election and serving until 1873. With redistricting changes, he was elected in 1873 from Maryland's 4th congressional district, serving three terms until 1879. In the United States Congress, Swann was chairman of the Committee on Foreign Affairs (Forty-fourth and Forty-fifth Congresses).

== Personal life ==
Swann married twice. In 1843, he and his first wife, Elizabeth Gilmer Sherlock (1814-1876), had a daughter, Elizabeth Gilmer Swann, who was their only child to reach adulthood. In 1878, the widower married Josephine Ward Thomson, daughter of Representative ("Congressman") Aaron Ward and widow of U.S. Senator John Renshaw Thomson; they had no children.

== Death and legacy ==
Swann died on his estate, "Morven Park", near Leesburg, Virginia. He is interred in the landmark Green Mount Cemetery (southeast of Maryland Route 45 and East North Avenue) of Baltimore. In eulogy, the influential "The Sun" newspaper of Baltimore criticized his early political errors, but credited him as "a great mayor, conferring inestimable benefits on the city he governed; not only was he a wise and beneficent governor to the oppressed portion of the citizens of the State, but he was one of the most useful and influential Congressmen this State or city ever had." Some of his family's papers are held by the University of Maryland library.

Swann Park, off of South Hanover Street (Maryland Route 2) in the South Baltimore/Spring Gardens area, adjacent to the eastern waterfront of Middle Branch (Smith and Ridgley's Coves) of the Patapsco River is named for him and also serves as an occasional athletic home for the former Southern High School (now Digital Harbor High School). Nearby are large monumental gas storage tanks for the Baltimore Gas and Electric Company.

In Virginia, both his childhood home, now called the "Swann-Daingerfield House" and Morven Park still exist (although expanded by later owners) and have been listed on the National Register for Historic Places since the 1970s. In addition, Alexandria named "Swann Avenue" near the former Potomac Railroad Yards, after him or the family.

It is assumed that Swann Street in Northwest Washington DC was originally named after Thomas Swann. However, in 2022, the Dupont Circle Advisory Neighborhood Commission approved a resolution declaring that Swann Street is named after William Dorsey Swann, one of the first known LGBT activists.

== Bibliography ==
- Andrews, Matthew Page (1929). History of Maryland. New York City: Doubleday Doran & Co.
- White, Frank F. Jr. The Governors of Maryland 1777-1970. Annapolis: The Hall of Records Commission. pp. 165–170.
- Coyle, Wilbur F. (1919). The Mayors of Baltimore. The Baltimore Municipal Journal. pp. 93–98.
- United States Congress. "Thomas Swann (id: S001092)". Biographical Directory of the United States Congress.
- Stover, John F. (1987). History of the Baltimore and Ohio Railroad. Purdue University Press. ISBN 0-911198-81-4 – via Google Books.
- Tuska, Benjamin (July 1925). "Know-Nothingism in Baltimore 1854-1860". The Catholic Historical Review. Vol. 11, no. 2. pp. 217–251. JSTOR 25012185.

Party political offices
Preceded by Augustus Bradford	Union nominee for Governor of Maryland; 1864	Succeeded by None
Political offices
Preceded by Samuel Hinks	Mayor of Baltimore; 1856–1860	Succeeded by George William Brown
Preceded by Augustus Bradford	Governor of Maryland; 1866–1869	Succeeded by Oden Bowie
U.S. House of Representatives
Preceded by Charles E. Phelps	Member of the U.S. House of Representatives from Maryland's 3rd congressional district 1869–1873	Succeeded by William J. O'Brien
Preceded by John Ritchie	Member of the U.S. House of Representatives from Maryland's 4th congressional district 1873–1879	Succeeded by Robert Milligan McLane
Business positions
Preceded by Louis McLane	President of Baltimore and Ohio Railroad; 1848 – 1853	Succeeded by William G. Harrison
