= Governor Bradford =

Governor Bradford may refer to:

- Augustus Bradford (1806–1881), 32nd Governor of Maryland
- Robert F. Bradford (1902–1983), 57th Governor of Massachusetts
- William Bradford (governor) (1590–1657), 2nd, 5th, 7th, 9th & 12th Governor of Plymouth Colony
