= Maryland Constitution of 1864 =

Third constitution of the U.S. state of Maryland

The Maryland Constitution of 1864 was the third of the four constitutions which have governed the U.S. state of Maryland. A controversial product of the Civil War and in effect only until 1867, when the state's present constitution was adopted, the 1864 document was short-lived.

== Drafting ==
The 1864 constitution was largely the product of strong Unionists, who had control of the state at the time. The document outlawed slavery, disenfranchised Southern sympathizers, and reapportioned the General Assembly based upon the number of white inhabitants. This provision further diminished the power of the small counties where the majority of the state's large former slave population lived. One of the framers' goals was to reduce the influence of Southern sympathizers, who had almost caused the state to secede in 1861.

The language in the constitution that outlawed slavery in the state was contained in a "Declaration of Rights", and it said, "That hereafter, in this State, there shall be neither slavery nor involuntary servitude, except in punishment of crime, whereof the party shall have been duly convicted; and all persons held to service or labor as slaves, are hereby declared free."

== Ratification ==
Vote by county (Green in favor, blue against.)

The convention which drafted the document convened on April 27, 1864, and completed their work by September 6. The constitution was then submitted to the people for ratification on October 13, 1864.

This was a very controversial result, since the state, though part of the Union, still had many Confederate ties and sympathies.

A majority of the voters who voted at their usual polling places opposed the Constitution, by a vote of 29,536 to 27,541. (Note: Alleghany County, Baltimore City, Baltimore County, Caroline County, Frederick County, and Washington County voted in favor of the Constitution. The vote was exactly tied in Cecil County. All other Maryland counties voted against the Constitution.) Soldiers from Maryland serving in the Union Army voted in favor of the Constitution, by a vote of 2,633 to 263. The total vote was in favor of the Constitution, by a vote of 30,174 to 29,799 (50.3% to 49.7%).

On October 29, 1864, Governor Augustus Bradford issued a proclamation that the Constitution had been adopted. The Constitution went into effect on November 1, 1864.

== Notable features ==
Marylanders who had left the state to fight for or live in the Confederacy or who had given it "any aid, comfort, countenace, or support" were prohibited from voting or holding public office in the state. It also made it difficult for them to regain the full rights of citizenship, and it required office-holders to take a new oath of allegiance to support the state and union and to repudiate the rebellion.

The influence of the small counties which had large slave populations, and tended to have supported secession and to have opposed Union efforts during the war, was reduced by basing representation solely on white population. The constitution did emancipate the slaves, but this did not mean equality. The franchise was restricted to "white" males. Additionally, the Maryland legislature refused to ratify both the 14th Amendment, which conferred citizenship rights on former slaves, and the 15th Amendment, which gave the vote to African Americans.

Maryland's 1864 constitution created for the first time the position of Lieutenant Governor. The Lieutenant Governor was to preside over the Senate, could cast a vote in the Senate in the case of a tie, and would succeed the Governor in case of death, resignation, leaving the state, or disqualification. The office was held by only one person, Christopher C. Cox, until a 1971 amendment to the 1867 constitution re-created the position.

The constitution also gave the Maryland General Assembly the authority to enlarge the state of Maryland by accepting territory contiguous to Maryland from Virginia, West Virginia, or the federal government, if both Congress and the territory's residents agreed. This came about because many Marylanders believed that the residents of either part or all of West Virginia could be tempted to join with Maryland. There were also some Marylanders who wanted to ask the residents of Loudoun County and the Eastern Shore of Virginia to join Maryland. Despite these portions being added to the Maryland Constitution, none of these areas ended up having a vote on joining the state of Maryland.

== Bibliography ==
- Whitman H. Ridgway. Maryland Humanities Council (2001). "(Maryland) Politics and Law"
- Whitman H. Ridgway. Maryland Humanities Council (2001). "(Maryland in) the Nineteenth Century".
- Richard E. Berg-Andersson (Dec. 5, 2004). "Constitutions of the Several states".
