= Augustus Bradford =

American politician (1806-1881)

Augustus Williamson Bradford
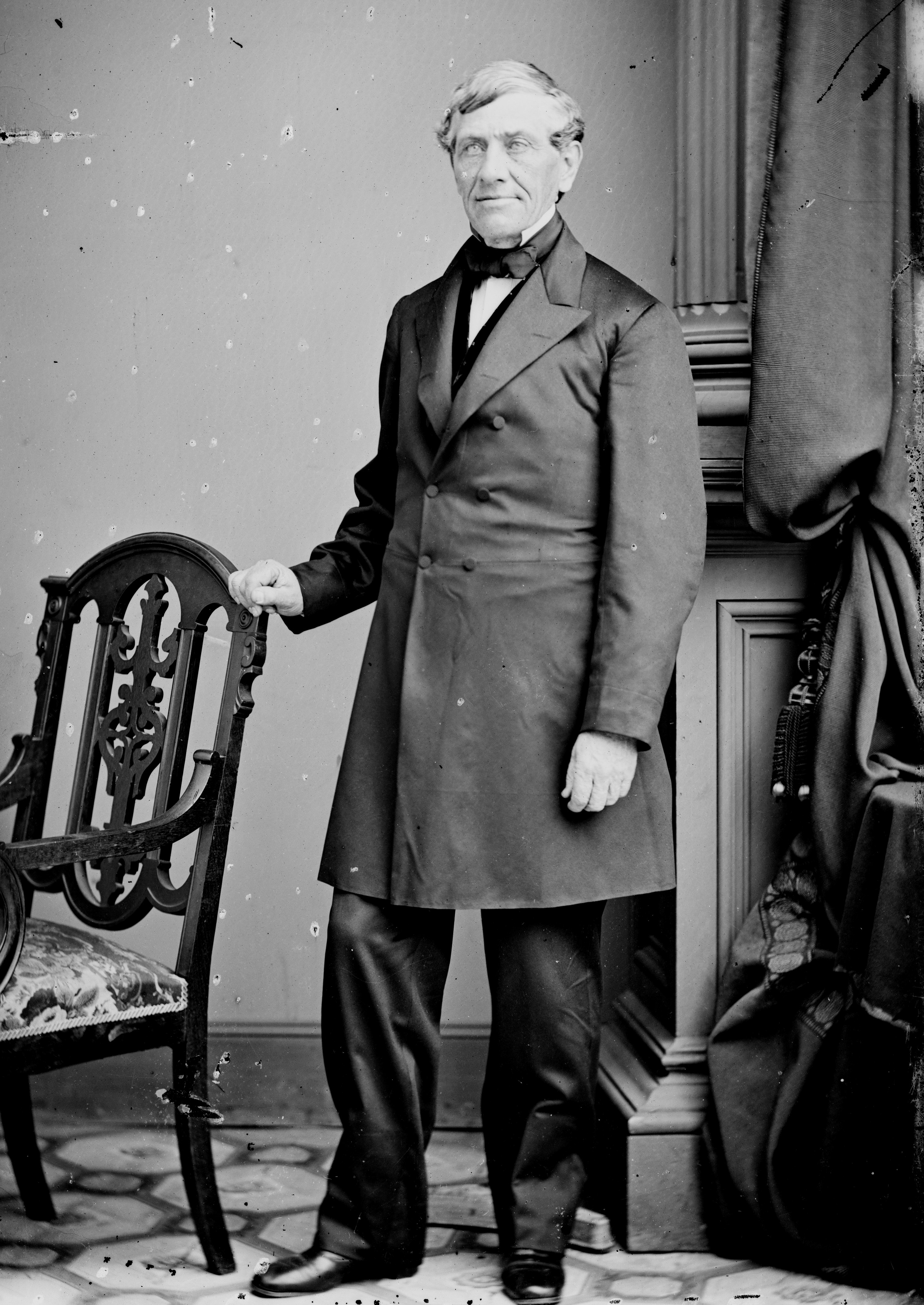
- Bradford, 1855–1865

32nd Governor of Maryland
- In office January 8, 1862 – January 10, 1866
- Lieutenant: Christopher C. Cox
- Preceded by: Thomas H. Hicks
- Succeeded by: Thomas Swann

Surveyor of Customs for the Port of Baltimore
- In office April 16, 1867 – April 12, 1869
- Preceded by: Robert Cathcart
- Succeeded by: Edlington Fulton

Clerk of the Court for Baltimore County, Maryland
- In office 1851–1857
- Preceded by: Thomas Kell
- Succeeded by: Henry M. Fitzhugh

Personal details
- Born: January 9, 1806 Bel Air, Maryland, U.S.
- Died: March 1, 1881 (aged 75) Baltimore, Maryland, U.S.
- Resting place: Green Mount Cemetery
- Party: Whig (1845–1854); American Party (1854–1861); Union (1861–1866); Democratic (1866–1872)
- Spouse: Elizabeth Kell Bradford (m. 1835)
- Children: 12
- Education: St. Mary's College
- Profession: Attorney
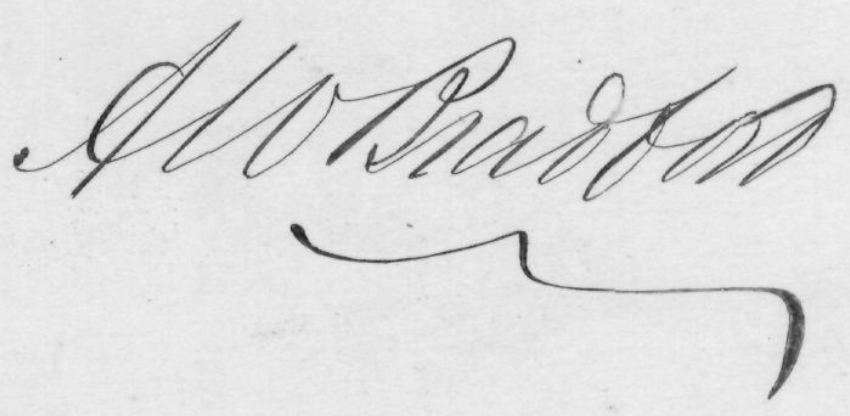
- Signature

Augustus Williamson Bradford (January 9, 1806 – March 1, 1881) was an American politician who served as the 32nd governor of Maryland from 1862 to 1866. He served as governor during the Civil War.

== Biography ==
Augustus Williamson Bradford was born in Bel Air, Maryland on January 9, 1806, the son of Samuel Bradford and Jane Bond. He graduated from St. Mary's College in 1824. After graduation, he studied law under the tutelage of Otho Scott, and was admitted to the bar in 1826. He later moved to Baltimore and lived there for the rest of his life. He married Elizabeth Kell on November 10, 1835, and they had twelve children, of whom seven survived their father.

In 1845, Governor Thomas Pratt appointed Bradford the Clerk of the Baltimore County Court, a post he occupied until 1851. In February 1861, Governor Thomas H. Hicks appointed Bradford one of Maryland's delegates to the Washington Peace Conference, where he made a speech supporting the Union. Following the conference, the Union Party named Bradford as its candidate for governor, opposing the Democratic candidate General Benjamin C. Howard. Bradford defeated Howard by approximately 30,000 votes and took office on January 8, 1862.

During his term, he violently opposed the Federal government's interference in Maryland's elections, upheld the dignity of the State government and defied the harsh and arbitrary military occupation, and went to great lengths to keep the State in the Union. At the same time he upheld the Federal government's authority although he differed with its methods. In September 1862, he was one of the many northern governors to attend the Loyal War Governors' Conference in Altoona, Pennsylvania.

During the Civil War, the Confederates invaded Maryland three times. During the last of these, Bradley T. Johnson’s raiders visited Bradford's home in July 1864, and during his absence, burned it to the ground together with all his furniture, library, and papers. This action was partially in retaliation for Union General David Hunter’s burning of the home of Governor John Letcher of Virginia, and partially because of Bradford's "uncompromising spirit and strong leanings."

During his four years in office, Augustus Bradford released Samuel Green (freedman) from jail on the condition he leave the state. Green was an African-American slave and minister, who was jailed in 1857 for possessing a copy of the novel Uncle Tom's Cabin.

He encouraged immigration into Maryland especially after the abolition of slavery, supported the appointment of a State Superintendent of Schools and School Commissioners, and the establishment of a system of education, and was instrumental in reorganizing the militia and in assisting in the movement to acquire a portion of the Gettysburg battlefield for a cemetery for the Union dead. The Constitution of 1864 which abolished slavery in the State and disenfranchised those who fought for or aided the Confederacy was only ratified by the vote of the soldiers in spite of Bradford's efforts to secure its adoption. In this respect, it was an extremely unsatisfactory document and it remained operative for only three years. Bradford objected to the federal government's policy of enlisting slaves in the Union Army at least until their owners could be compensated. At the only election held under the Constitution of 1864, that of November 8, 1864, Thomas Swann was elected as Bradford's successor. He took his oath of office on January 11, 1865, but by a provision of the Constitution, he did not actually become Governor until January 10, 1866.

After Bradford's retirement from office, President Andrew Johnson appointed him the Surveyor of the Port of Baltimore, which he served as until April 1869. He became a Democrat about 1872, and he was elected one of the Horace Greeley presidential electors in that year. He retired in 1869, and died in Baltimore on March 1, 1881. Funeral services were held at the Mount Vernon M.E. Church. He was buried in Green Mount Cemetery in Baltimore, Maryland.

Party political offices
First	Union nominee for Governor of Maryland; 1861	Succeeded by Thomas Swann
Political offices
Preceded by Thomas H. Hicks	Governor of Maryland; 1862–1866	Succeeded by Thomas Swann
