= Wilson Cary Swann =

American physician and social reformer (1806–1876)

Wilson Cary Swann (1806 – March 21, 1876) was an American medical doctor, philanthropist, and social reformer. Born in present-day Alexandria, Virginia, he moved to Philadelphia in 1847, and spent the rest of his life there. Swann held around 40 slaves, whom he freed shortly after his marriage in 1847.

Swann had leadership roles in several philanthropic organizations in Philadelphia, including the Society for the Prevention of Cruelty to Animals and the Philadelphia Fountain Society, which financed the construction of numerous drinking fountains in the city. He also maintained a substantial art collection.

== Early and family life ==
Swann was born in Alexandria, Virginia (then part of the District of Columbia) in 1806. His father was Thomas Swann, a prominent local attorney and businessman who would later become United States Attorney for the District by James Monroe. Swann's brother, Thomas Swann, much later became Baltimore's mayor, then governor of Maryland and a U.S. Congressman.

Swann attended the University of Virginia. He then studied medicine at the University of Pennsylvania, receiving an MD in 1830.

He married Maria Bell in October 1847.

== Career ==
Like his father, Swann served on the Alexandria city council. He inherited an island in the Potomac River after his father died in 1840. Together with these real estate holdings, he also took control of his father's slaves. He later constructed a mansion on the Virginia side of the river.

For some time after his marriage Swann divided his time between Philadelphia and Virginia. His estate suffered from his frequent absence, however, and his wife's health was too precarious for travel. Consequently, he sold his Virginia property and emancipated the 40 slaves under his control.

In Philadelphia, Swann became known as a reformer and philanthropist. He became the first president of the local Society for the Prevention of Cruelty to Animals (SPCA) and also wrote stories for children designed to foster their appreciation for animals.

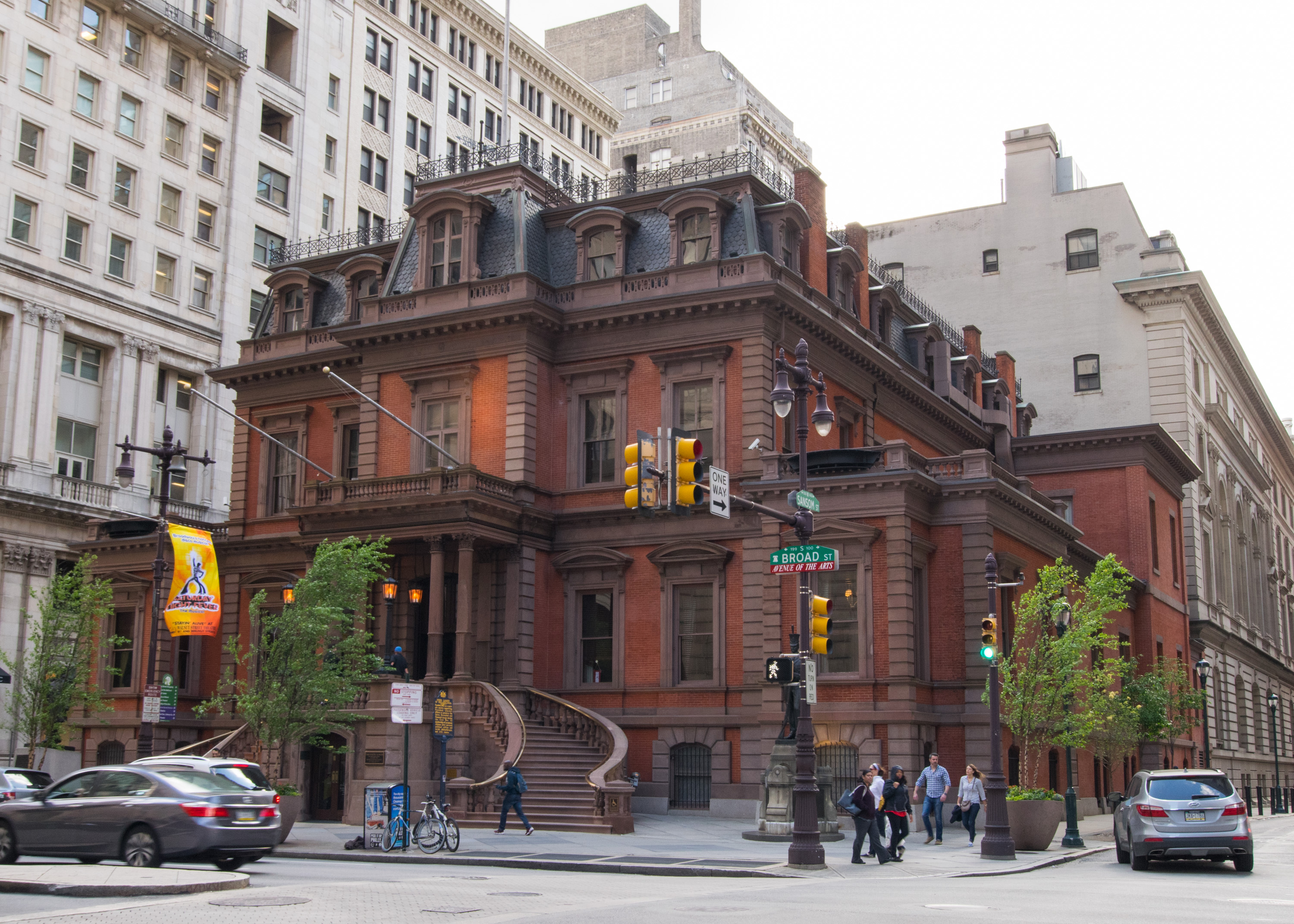
Union League of Philadelphia, 2017. Constructed 1865.

When the Civil War began, Swann joined the Union League, and helped fund the construction of its clubhouse on Broad Street. When the war ended, Swann stated that he was in favor of treating Southerners kindly.

In February 1869, Swann became the first president of the Philadelphia Fountain Society, which sponsored the construction of drinking fountains for humans and working animals in the city. His aim was in part to "promote temperance and relieve animal suffering".

Swann also collected art. His collection reportedly included works by Rubens, Titian, Leonardo da Vinci, Murillo, Angelica Kauffman, and Leutze.

== Death and legacy ==
Swann died on March 21, 1876.

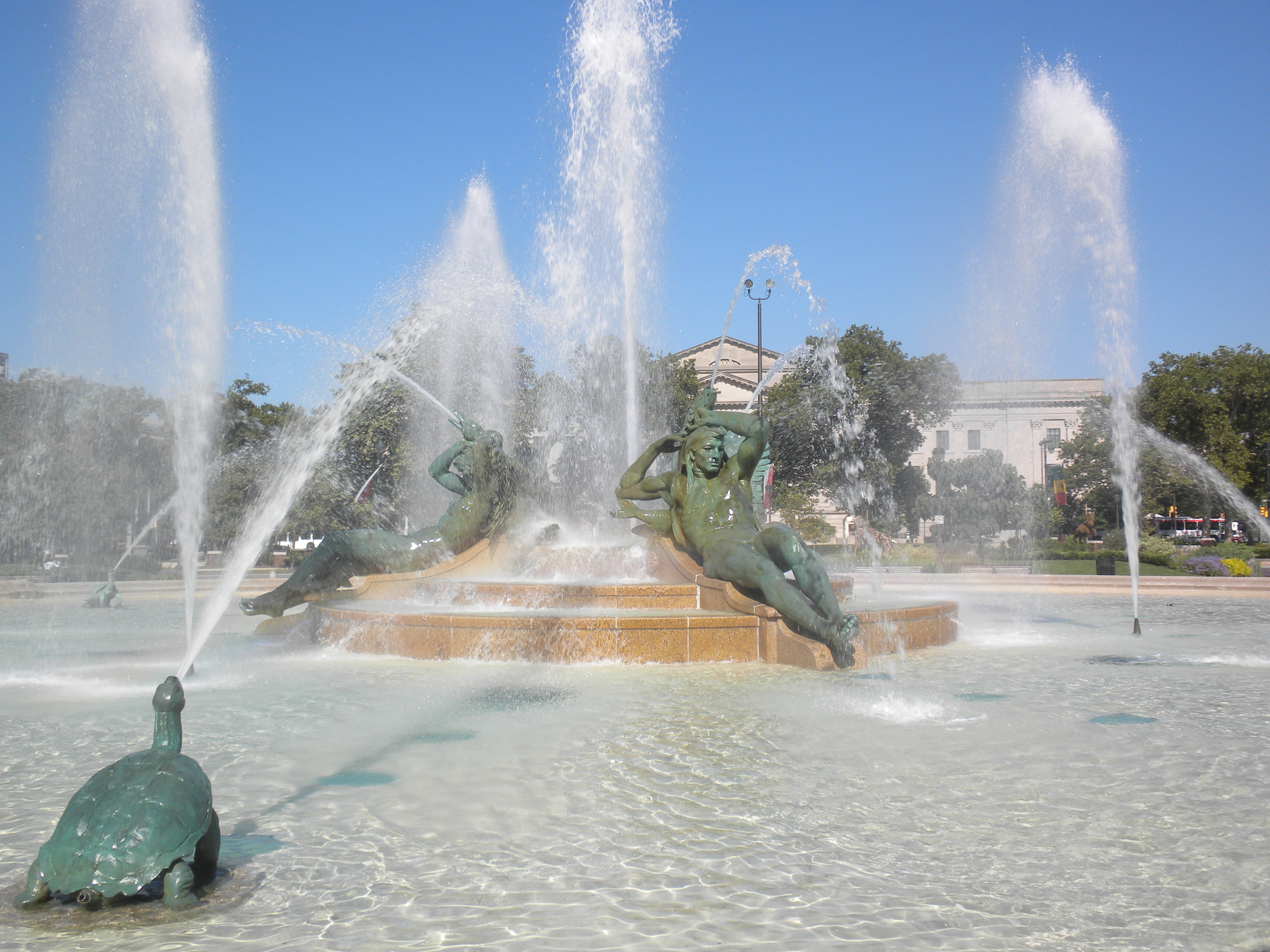
The Swann Memorial Fountain

In 1924, the Philadelphia Fountain Society built the Swann Memorial Fountain in honor of Dr. Swann. The fountain was designed by sculptor Alexander Stirling Calder and architect Wilson Eyre. The fountain is located in Logan Circle, at the midpoint of the Benjamin Franklin Parkway.

== Sources ==
- Fairmount Park Art Association (1974). Sculpture of a City: Philadelphia's Treasures in Bronze and Stone. New York: Walker Publishing Company. ISBN 9780802704597. OCLC 1151158386.
- Robson, Charles, ed. (1874). "Swann, Wilson C.". The Biographical Encyclopædia of Pennsylvania in the Nineteenth Century. Philadelphia: Galaxy Publishing Company. pp. 113–114. OCLC 1041649478.
