= Samuel Bogley =

American lawyer and politician

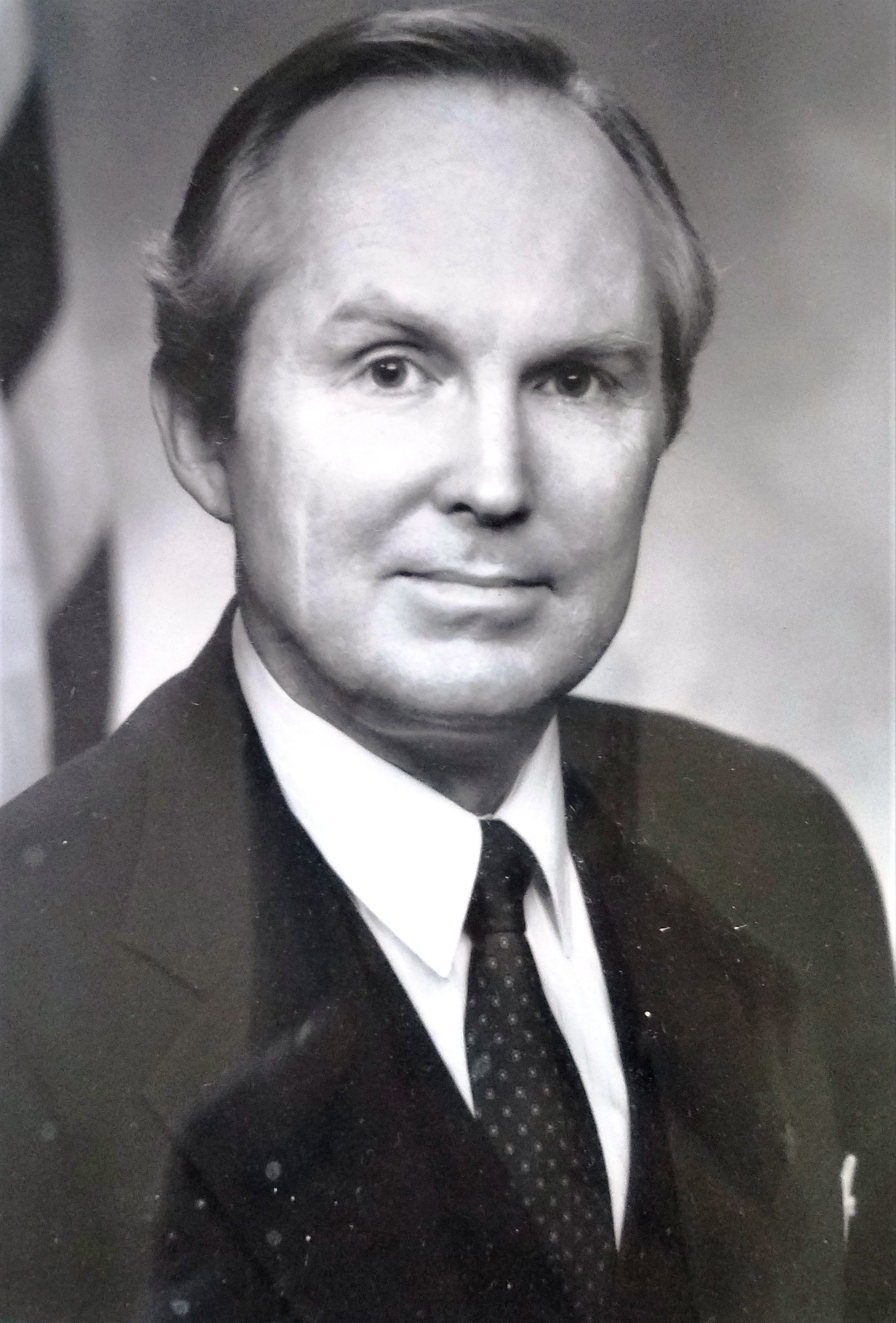

3rd Lieutenant Governor of Maryland
- In office January 17, 1979 – January 19, 1983
- Governor: Harry Hughes
- Preceded by: Blair Lee III
- Succeeded by: J. Joseph Curran Jr.

Personal details
- Born: November 16, 1941 Washington, D.C., U.S.
- Died: March 10, 2022 (aged 80) Bowie, Maryland, U.S.
- Profession: Attorney

Samuel Walter Bogley III (November 16, 1941 – March 10, 2022) was an American politician who served as the third lieutenant governor of Maryland from 1979 to 1983 under Governor Harry Hughes. He had previously served in various local and state level offices in Maryland, including as a commissioner and county councilman of Prince George's County.

Hughes' 1978 gubernatorial candidacy was a long-shot, and he had a hard time recruiting a running mate; Bogley was reportedly the tenth person he asked. Even before taking office, the two clashed over abortion rights, which Hughes supported and Bogley opposed. Bogley was required to promise in writing not to contradict Hughes on any issue during their term. For his second term, Hughes chose Sen. J. Joseph Curran Jr. as his running mate and Bogley ran unsuccessfully for lieutenant governor in the Democratic primary with gubernatorial candidate Sen. Harry McGuirk.

After leaving office as Lieutenant Governor, Bogley practiced law in Beltsville, Maryland. In September 1988, President Ronald Reagan nominated him to serve on the Merit Systems Protection Board. The 100th Congress did not act on the nomination before adjourning for the year in October. Bogley received a one-year recess appointment to the board in November 1988, good until the next congressional adjournment. When the 101st Congress convened in January 1989, the departing President Reagan renominated Bogley. His recess appointment expired in November 1989 and his nomination was withdrawn by the Bush administration in January 1990.

35 years after leaving office as Lt. Governor, Bogley filed as a candidate for Prince George's County Executive in February 2018. He finished last out of nine candidates in the June 26, 2018 Democratic primary, receiving just 0.2% of the votes cast. When asked about the purpose of his candidacy at his advanced stage in life, Bogley stated that he simply added his name to the ballot "to provide a choice to my fellow generation of Democrats".

Bogley received his education from Duke University, the University of Maryland, College Park, and the University of Baltimore School of Law. He received his Juris Doctor degree from the University of Baltimore in 1967, and was admitted to the Maryland Bar in 1968. He married Rita Brady and has eight children.

Bogley died on March 10, 2022, aged 80, in Bowie, Maryland.

Political offices
Preceded by Blair Lee III	Lieutenant Governor of Maryland; 1979–1983	Succeeded by J. Joseph Curran Jr.
