= Samuel Hinks =

American mayor (1815–1887)

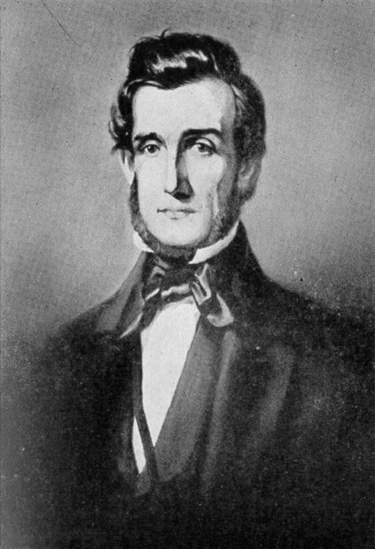
- Samuel Hinks, Mayor of Baltimore 1854-56

18th Mayor of Baltimore
- In office 1854–1856
- Preceded by: John Smith Hollins
- Succeeded by: Thomas Swann

Personal details
- Born: May 1, 1815 Ellicott City, Maryland, U.S.
- Died: November 30, 1887 (aged 72) Frederick, Maryland, U.S.
- Resting place: Mount Olivet Cemetery; Frederick, Maryland, U.S.
- Party: Know Nothing

Samuel Hinks (May 1, 1815 – November 30, 1887) was Mayor of Baltimore, Maryland, from 1854 to 1856. He was a member of the Know Nothing party. He was succeeded in 1856 by fellow Know Nothing Thomas Swann.

== Early life ==
Samuel Hinks was born in Ellicott City, Howard County, Maryland on May 1, 1815. In his early adult life he became a steam engineer. Later he moved to Baltimore where he entered the grain business, and soon established a partnership with his brother, Charles Dent Hinks.

== Politics ==
In 1854 Samuel Hinks was elected Mayor of Baltimore, standing as a candidate for the nationalist anti-Catholic American Party. Members of the party were popularly known as "Know-Nothings" because, when asked about their secret organizations, their members were said to reply "I know nothing".

=== Baltimore mayoral election of 1856 ===
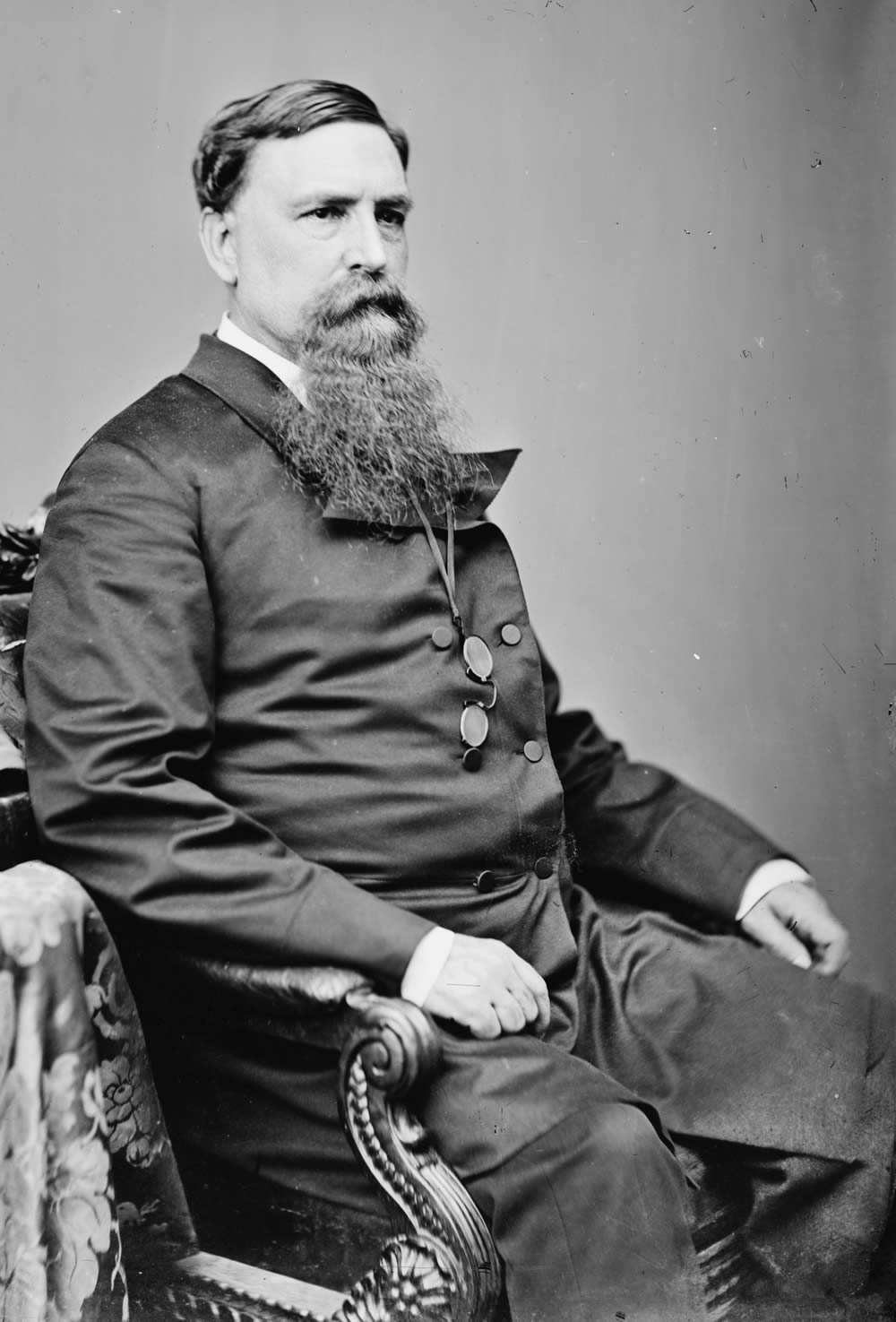
Hinks's successor as Mayor of Baltimore, Thomas Swann.

During the mid-1850s public order in Baltimore had been threatened by the election of candidates of the American Party. As the 1856 Mayoral elections approached, Hinks was pressed by Baltimorians to order the militia of General George H. Steuart in readiness to maintain order, as widespread violence was anticipated. Hinks duly gave Steuart the order to ready the militia, but he soon rescinded it. In the event, violence broke out on polling day, with shots exchanged by competing mobs.

In the 2nd and 8th wards several citizens were killed, and many wounded. In the 6th ward artillery was used, and a pitched battle fought on Orleans St between gangs of Know Nothings and rival Democrats, raging for several hours. The result of the election, in which voter fraud was widespread, was a victory for the Know Nothing candidate, Thomas Swann, by around 9,000 votes. Swann duly succeeded Hinks as Mayor of Baltimore.

== Later life ==
In 1860, Hinks retired from the grain business. Soon afterwards he was elected Water Registrar, a position which he continued to hold until 1863. He died on November 30, 1887, in Frederick, Maryland. He was interred at Mount Olivet Cemetery in Frederick.

== See also ==
- Know-Nothing
