= Thomas Swan =

Thomas Swan may refer to:

- Thomas Walter Swan (1877–1975), U.S. Court of Appeals judge
- Thomas Swan (abolitionist) (1795–1857), British abolitionist Baptist minister

== See also ==
- Thomas Swann (disambiguation)
