= Jeffersonian Democrat =

Weekly newspaper

- Type: Weekly newspaper
- Owner: Community Media Group
- Founder: Thomas Hastings
- Publisher: Pat Patterson
- Editor: Joy Norwood
- Founded: 1839
- Headquarters: 113 Main Street, Brookville, Pennsylvania, United States
- Circulation: 3,000
- OCLC number: 13379014
- Website: www.thecourierexpress.com/jeffersonian_democrat/

The Jeffersonian Democrat is a weekly newspaper published in Brookville, Pennsylvania, with circulation about 3,000. The paper is owned by Community Media Group. Pat Patterson is the publisher and Joy Norwood is the editor.

== History ==
The paper was started in 1839 or earlier by Thomas Hastings and was called the Backwoodsman. His son John Hastings, at age 18, was the editor. The paper remained a Democratic weekly after the American Civil War, and it was later merged with the Jeffersonian and the Democrat and the Graphic and renamed the Jeffersonian Democrat.

Major John McMurray purchased the Jeffersonian Democrat in 1878; his co-owner was William Leader. McMurray owned the paper and was its editor for over 30 years. When he died, in 1920, Major McMurray passed the Jeffersonian Democrat down to his son, Harry McMurray. Harry died just a few months later and the paper was passed down to his sons H.E. McMurray and John J.

The Jeffersonian Democrat was purchased in 1990 by Independent Publications (then McLean Publishing Co.) At the time it had a circulation of 3,000 papers. In 1993 Independent Publications launched the Tri-County Sunday which served as a combined Sunday issue for three of its papers including the Jeffersonian Democrat.

Community Media Group of Frankfort, Illinois bought the Jeffersonian Democrat in 2013 as part of a multi-paper deal. The newspaper closed its office in September 2024.
