= Governor of Maryland =

Head of government of the U.S. State of Maryland

Governor of the State of Maryland
- Great Seal of the State of Maryland

- Flag of the State of Maryland

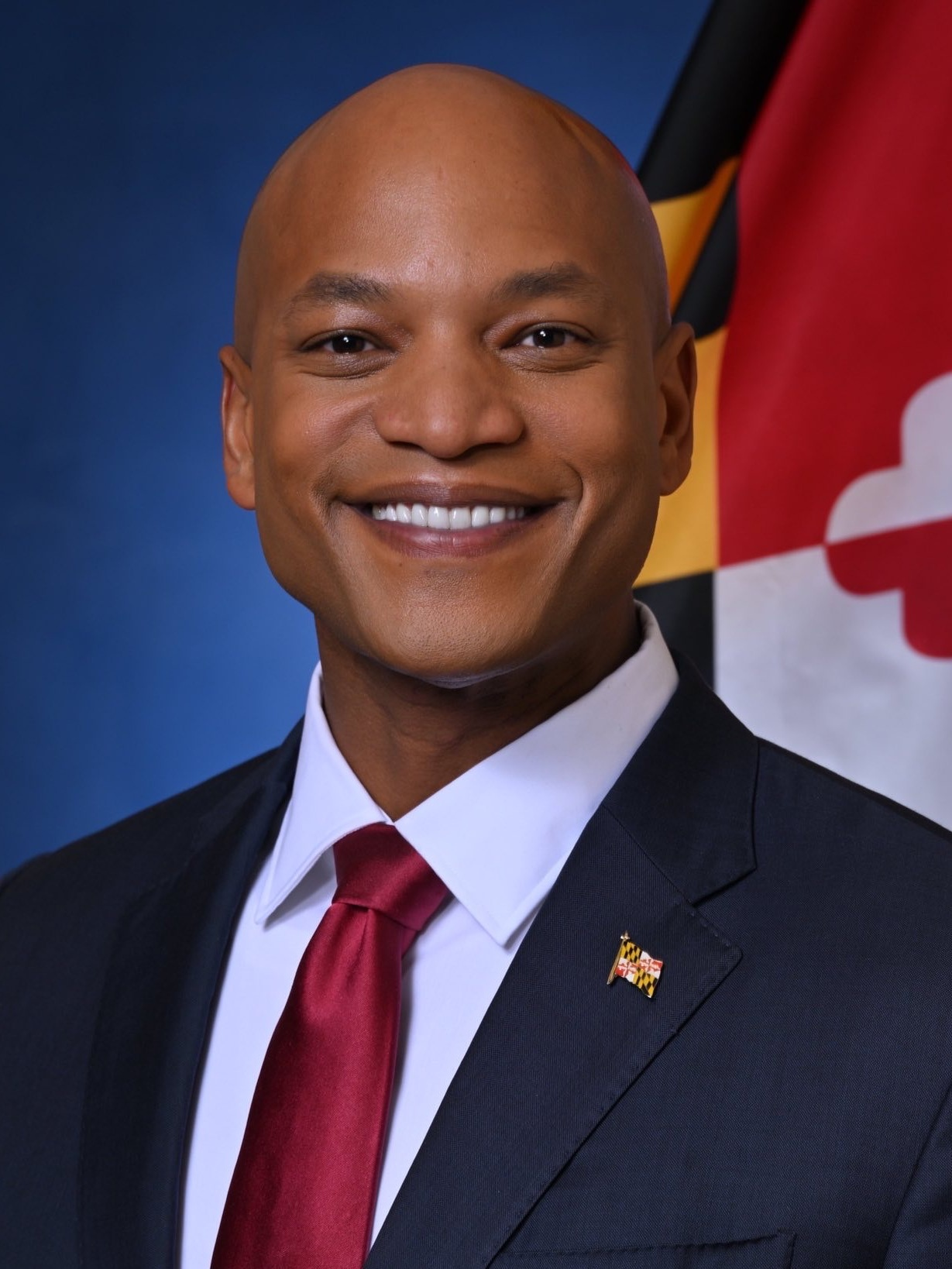
- Incumbent; Wes Moore since January 18, 2023
- Government of Maryland
- Style: Governor (informal); The Honorable (formal)
- Status: Head of state; Head of government
- Residence: Government House
- Seat: Annapolis, Maryland
- Term length: Four years, renewable once consecutively
- Constituting instrument: Maryland Constitution of 1776
- Inaugural holder: Thomas Johnson
- Formation: March 21, 1777 (249 years ago)
- Succession: Line of succession
- Deputy: Lieutenant Governor of Maryland
- Salary: $180,000 (2018)
- Website: governor.maryland.gov

The governor of the State of Maryland is the head of government of Maryland, and is the commander-in-chief of the state's National Guard units. The governor is the highest-ranking official in the state and has a broad range of appointive powers in both the state and local governments, as specified by the Maryland Constitution (1867, and revisions/amendments).

The current governor is Wes Moore, who has been in office since 2023.

== Selection and qualifications ==
Like most state chief executives in the United States, the governor is elected by the citizens of Maryland to serve a four-year term. Under the Constitution of Maryland, the governor can run any number of times, but not more than twice in a row. This makes it possible for a two-term governor to run for the office again after remaining out of office for at least one term. An eligible candidate for governor must be at least 30 years old, and also a resident of and a registered voter in Maryland for the five years preceding the election. Candidates meeting this minimum requirement must file with the Maryland State Board of Elections, pay a filing fee, file a financial disclosure, and create a legal campaign financial body. The governor, like all statewide officials in Maryland, is elected in the even-numbered years in which the election for president of the United States does not occur.

== Functions and responsibilities ==
As the chief executive of the State of Maryland, the governor heads the executive branch of government, which includes all state executive departments and agencies, as well as advisory boards, commissions, committees, and task forces. The main constitutional responsibility of the governor of Maryland, and any other state's chief executive, is to carry out the business of the state and to enforce the laws passed by the legislature. The governor also has some say in these laws, since the governor has the ability to veto any bill sent to his or her desk by the Maryland General Assembly, though the assembly may override that veto. The governor is also given a number of more specific powers as relates to appropriations of state funds, the appointment of state officials, and also a variety of less prominent and less commonly utilized powers.

=== Appropriations ===
Every year, the governor must present a proposed budget to the Maryland General Assembly. After receiving the proposed budget, the assembly is then allowed to decrease any portion of the budget for the executive branch, but it may never increase it or transfer funds between executive departments. The assembly may, however, increase funds for the legislative and judicial branches of government. The governor has the power to veto any law that is passed by the General Assembly, including a "line item veto", which can be used to strike certain portions of appropriations bills. The legislature then has the power to override a governor's veto by vote of three-fifths (60%) of the number of members in each house.

The governor also sits on the board of public works, whose other two members are the comptroller and the treasurer. This board has broad powers in overseeing and approving the spending of state funds. They must approve state expenditures of all general funds and capital improvement funds, excluding expenditures for the construction of state roads, bridges, and highways. It has the power to solicit loans on its own accord either to meet a deficit or in anticipation of other revenues, in addition to approving expenditures of funds from loans authorized by the General Assembly.

=== Appointment powers ===
The governor appoints almost all military and civil officers of the state government, subject to advice and consent of the Maryland State Senate. The governor also appoints certain boards and commissions in each of the 24 counties and in Baltimore City, such as local Boards of Elections, commissions notaries public, and appoints officers to fill vacancies in the elected offices of attorney general and comptroller. Should a vacancy arise in either of the two houses of the General Assembly, the governor also fills that vacancy, though the governor must choose from among the recommendations of the local party organization to which the person leaving the vacancy belonged. Any officer appointed by the governor, except a member of the General Assembly, is removable by him or her, if there is a legitimate cause for removal. Among the most prominent of the governor's appointees are the 24 secretaries and heads of departments that currently make up the Governor's Cabinet, also known as the Executive Council.

=== Executive council ===
The governor of Maryland is the chairman of the Governor's Executive Council (or Cabinet) which coordinates all state government functions. This is composed of the following members, all of whom, except the lieutenant governor, are appointed by the governor with the advice and consent of the Maryland State Senate as heads of executive departments:

- Lieutenant Governor – Aruna Miller
- Secretary of State – Susan C. Lee
- Secretary of Aging – Carmel Roques
- Secretary of Agriculture – Kevin Atticks
- Secretary of Budget and Management – Jake Weissmann
- Secretary of Commerce – Harry Coker
- Secretary of Disabilities – Carol Beatty
- State Superintendent of Schools (appointed by the State Board of Education to direct the Maryland State Department of Education) – Carey Wright
- Secretary of Environment – Serena McIlwain
- Secretary of General Services – Atif Chaudhry
- Secretary of Health and Mental Hygiene – Meena Seshamani
- Secretary of Housing and Community Development – Jacob R. Day
- Secretary of Human Resources – Rafael López
- Secretary of Information Technology – Katie Savage
- Secretary of Juvenile Services – Betsy Fox Tolentino
- Secretary of Labor, Licensing, and Regulation – Portia Wu
- Secretary of Natural Resources – Josh Kurtz
- Secretary of Planning – Rebecca Flora
- Secretary of Public Safety and Correctional Services – Carolyn Scruggs
- Secretary of State Police (commanding officer of the Maryland State Police) – Michael Jackson
- Secretary of Transportation – Kathryn Thomson
- Secretary of Veterans Affairs – Ed Rothstein
- Secretary of Higher Education (head of the Maryland Higher Education Commission) – Sanjay Rai
- Secretary of Service and Civic Innovation - Jonny Dorsey
- Adjutant General (head of the Maryland Military Department) – Janeen L. Birckhead

Other members of the governor's staff may be invited to Cabinet meetings as "attendees".

The governor also oversees several sub-cabinets that coordinate the activities of a certain function of state government that involves several state departments or agencies. Currently, these are the Base Realignment and Closure Subcabinet, BayStat Subcabinet, Chesapeake Bay cabinet, Children's Cabinet, Governor's Subcabinet for International Affairs, Smart Growth Subcabinet, and Workforce Creation Subcabinet.

=== Other powers and responsibilities ===
The governor is the commander-in-chief of the military forces of the state: the Maryland Army National Guard and Air National Guard and the Maryland Defense Force, except when the former of these forces have been called into federal service, which the President of the United States has the authority to do. In times of public emergency, the governor may exercise emergency powers, including the mobilization of these military forces. In the area of criminal justice, the governor may grant pardons to criminals, commute the sentences of prisoners, or remit fines and forfeitures imposed on people who have been convicted, jailed, or fined for violations of state laws.

In both these areas, and a variety of others, the governor sits on state and interstate boards and commissions with varying powers. The governor is also obligated to report on the conditions of the state at any time during the year, though this traditionally happens in a "State of the State" address each January at the beginning of the annual General Assembly session.

=== The governor's staff ===
In addition to the various departments and agencies under gubernatorial control, the governor has an executive administrative staff that assist in coordinating the executive duties. This staff is led by a chief of staff, and includes five offices: Intergovernmental Relations, Legal Counsel, Legislative and Policy, Press, and the Governor's Office in Washington, D.C. The chief of staff has a number of deputies to assist in running these departments. The governor's staff is appointed and therefore largely exempt from state civil service laws.

== History and evolution of the office ==
=== 1600s–1800s ===
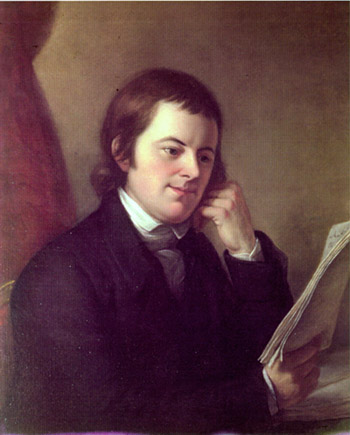
Thomas Johnson, the first governor of Maryland after independence. He served from 1777 to 1779.

During the colonial period, Maryland's proprietors, the Barons and Lords of Baltimore, who generally remained in the Kingdom of England, chose who would serve as the proprietary governor of Maryland on their behalf. Leonard Calvert (1606–1647), youngest brother of the second Lord Baltimore, Cecilius Calvert (1605–1675), and the first lord proprietor, came with the first settlers in March 1634 to serve as the first governor of the colonial Province of Maryland until his death in 1647. Between 1692, when the Baltimores lost control, and 1715, Maryland was a direct royal colony, and the governor was appointed by the British monarch. The Lords of Baltimore regained their royal charter in 1715, under the British monarchs of the House of Hanover, and then under the fifth and sixth Lord Baltimores, they resumed choosing the governors until the beginning of the American Revolution (1775–1783). The first governor of an independent state chosen to break this chain of colonial governors was Thomas Johnson (1732–1819) of Frederick County, who took office on March 21, 1777.

Under the first Maryland Constitution of 1776 for the independent state, the governor was chosen for one-year terms by both houses of the General Assembly. An 1838 constitutional amendment allowed voters to elect the governor to a three-year term from one of three rotating gubernatorial districts: eastern, southern, and western parts of the state. At each election, only voters from a single gubernatorial election district selected the governor. A four-year term was established by the second Maryland Constitution of 1851, and geographic requirements were removed by the third Constitution of 1864 during the American Civil War. The fourth and current constitution was ratified by the people after the war in 1867. An amendment in 1922, added article XVII, title "Quadrennial Elections", to the 1867 state constitution and set the next election year to be 1926 and every four years thereafter, thereby shifting from the historical off-year cycle (...1915, 1919, 1923) to the present mid-term election cycle.

From 1777 to 1870, the governor resided in the Jennings House in Annapolis. Located on the site of the future expanded campus of the adjacent United States Naval Academy (founded 1845), the house was later sold to the academy in 1869 after it returned from its northern hiatus in Rhode Island during the American Civil War (1861–1865). It was razed in 1901 for additional USNA buildings. Since 1870, the governor of Maryland has resided in the Government House, originally a Victorian style architecture red brick mansion (later rebuilt/renovated in the 1930s into a Georgian-styled mansion to match other colonial/Georgian-Federal era styled architecture state buildings and residences in the historic city). It is located on State Circle adjacent to the colonial era Maryland State House built 1772–1797. In addition to being the residence of the governor and his family, Government House has a number of public rooms that are used by the governor on official occasions.

=== 1900s–present ===
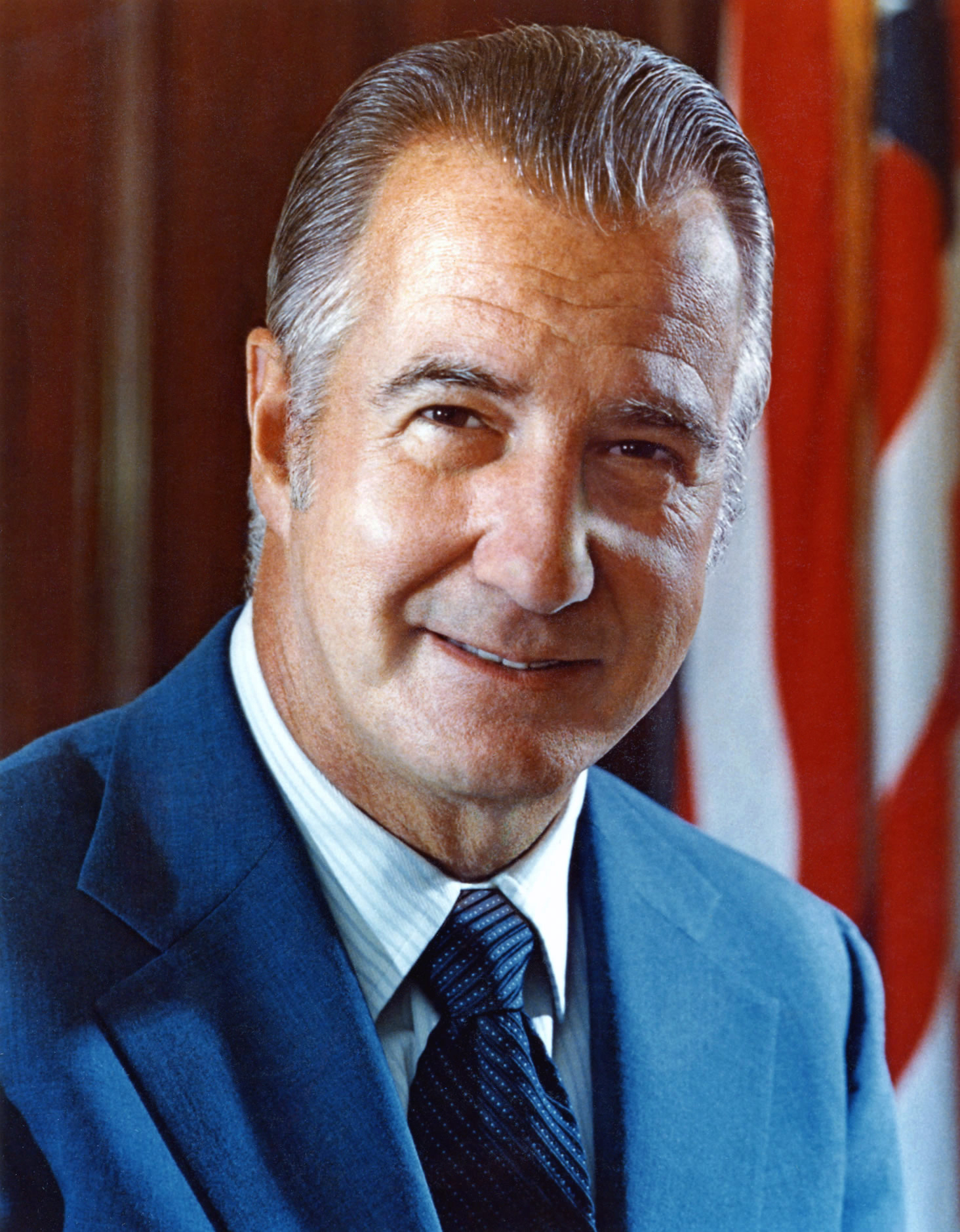
Former Maryland governor and U.S. vice president Spiro Agnew

Spiro Agnew, who was the 55th governor of Maryland from 1967 to 1969, later served as the 39th vice president of the United States under President Richard M. Nixon. Agnew is, thus far, the highest-ranking Marylander (along with 19th-century chief justice Roger B. Taney) in public service in the history of the United States. He resigned after pleading "no contest" to federal legal charges of corruption during his terms as Baltimore County executive, Maryland governor and vice president. In 1979, his gubernatorial portrait was removed from the Maryland State House Governor's Reception Room. In 1995, then-governor Parris Glendening re-included the portrait, stating that it was not up to anyone to alter history, whether for good or bad, citing the famous novel by George Orwell, Nineteen Eighty-Four.

As of 2023, Maryland has not yet had a female governor. However, women were the runners-up in four gubernatorial elections (in 1974, 1994, 1998, and 2002), three Republicans and one Democrat. In addition, two women have been the lieutenant governor; Kathleen Kennedy Townsend, under Democratic governor Parris Glendening from 1995 to 2003; and Aruna Miller, under Democratic governor Wes Moore since 2023. Another woman, Kristen Cox, who was the Secretary of Disabilities, unsuccessfully ran for lieutenant governor as the running mate of then incumbent Republican governor Robert Ehrlich, when the lieutenant governor at that time, Michael Steele, left office to run for the U.S. Senate. Cox was a unique person to run for that office, not only because she is a woman, but also because she is legally blind.

== Lieutenant governor ==
In 1971, the office of Lieutenant Governor of Maryland, which had existed for only a few years in the 1860s, was re-instituted by an amendment to the Maryland Constitution. The lieutenant governor is a weak office compared to other counterparts (in other states including Texas, the lieutenant governor is the president of the state's Senate, while in California the lieutenant governor assumes all of the governor's powers when the sitting governor is out of the state), as it only possesses the powers and duties that the governor assigns to him or her. The lieutenant governor is elected on the same ballot with the governor, and to the same term of office as the governor. The lieutenant governor succeeds to the governorship only if there is a vacancy in that office.

Despite the governor and lieutenant governor being elected on the same party ticket, very often there have been public rifts between the two; for instance Gov. Marvin Mandel and Lt. Gov. Blair Lee III; Gov. Harry R. Hughes and Lt. Gov. Samuel W. Bogley III; Gov. Schaefer and Lt. Gov. Melvin A. Steinberg., and Gov. Parris Glendening and Lt. Gov. Kathleen Kennedy Townsend. No lieutenant governor of Maryland has yet been elected as the governor in future elections, or permanently succeeded to the governor's office due to a vacancy (which would be created by the resignation, death, or removal of the sitting governor), although Blair Lee III served as acting governor from June 4, 1977, until January 15, 1979, while Governor Marvin Mandel was serving a sentence for mail fraud and racketeering (consequently, in a modern example of Damnatio memoriae, Mandel's official gubernatorial portrait was not hung in the Maryland State House Governor's Reception Room until 1993).

== Timeline ==
Timeline of Maryland governors

== See also ==
- Government of Maryland
- Lieutenant Governor of Maryland
- Maryland gubernatorial elections
- List of colonial governors of Maryland
- Impeachment in Maryland
