= Thomas Swann (attorney) =

Attorney and member of the Virginia House of Delegates

Member of the Virginia House of Delegates for Loudoun County
- In office November 11, 1794 – December 27, 1794 Serving with Stevens Thomson Mason
- Preceded by: Joseph Lane
- Succeeded by: William Ellzey Jr.

Member of the Virginia House of Delegates for Fairfax County
- In office December 2, 1799 – December 6, 1801 Serving with Richard Bland Lee, Nicholas Fitzhugh
- Preceded by: John Carlyle Herbert
- Succeeded by: Henry Rose

United States Attorney for the District of Columbia
- In office 1821–1833
- Preceded by: Walter Jones Jr.
- Succeeded by: Francis Scott Key

Personal details
- Born: July 21, 1765 Prince George's County, Maryland Colony, British America
- Died: February 2, 1840 (aged 74) Loudoun County, Virginia, U.S.
- Resting place: Morven Park Estate cemetery, Loudoun County, Virginia, U.S.
- Spouse: Jane Byrd Page
- Children: Wilson Cary Swann, Thomas Swann Jr.
- Occupation: Lawyer, politician

Thomas Swann (July 21, 1765 – February 2, 1840) was an American lawyer, businessman and politician who twice served in the Virginia House of Delegates and for more than a decade served as the United States Attorney for the District of Columbia.

== Early and family life ==
Swann was born in Prince George's County, Maryland to the former Nancy Ann Naylor and her husband, Edward Swann Jr. He had several brothers (some of whom fought in the American Revolutionary War and William T. Swann who would follow him to Alexandria) and sisters. He received a private education suitable for his class. In January 1789 he settled in Loudoun County and on April 2, 1795 married Jane Byrd Page (1774-1812), who was descended from the First Families of Virginia. Her father Mann Page of Gloucester County had died in 1779, when she was a child, but left her 2000 pounds if she reached adulthood, as well as a personal estate including many slaves. The new Swann family settled in Alexandria by the end of the year. Although three children died as infants and are buried (as is their mother) in the graveyard of Christ Church in Alexandria, theirs sons Wilson Cary Swann, Thomas Swann Jr., Edward Swann, John Swann, William Page Swann and Robert Page Swann and daughter Mary Swann survived their mother. W.C. Swann and Thomas Swann Jr. followed their father's path into politics, and the latter eventually became president of the Baltimore and Ohio Railroad, then Baltimore's mayor before the American Civil War and Maryland's governor and a U.S. Congressman after the war.

Their mother's legacy, several children and interconnected family relationships led this man to file a deed in 1818 dividing property among their children, as well as considerable additional probate litigation in the 1830s. Although not listed in tax and census records for northern Virginia counties, the Swann household owned enslaved people, at least 40 when this Thomas Swann died in 1840.

== Career ==
The elder Thomas Swann studied law, was admitted to the Virginia bar, and practiced in northern Virginia and what became the new federal city, Washington, D.C. In 1794, Loudoun County voters elected him as one of their two (part-time) representatives in the Virginia House of Delegates, where he served alongside fellow Alexandria attorney Charles Lee. In 1795 Swann was appointed the prosecutor for the city of Alexandria, Virginia, and he became a city councilor in 1799 and again in 1801-1802, as well as for a final time after Alexandria became part of the District of Columbia in 1804-1805. Either as prosecutor or city councilor (or both), in 1805 he joined Edmund J. Lee and other attorneys in petitioning President Thomas Jefferson to grant an official pardon to a slave sentenced to death for committing a burglary in Alexandria.

Swann again won election as delegate to the Virginia House of Delegates, this time representing Fairfax County in the 1799 session alongside Richard Bland Lee, then winning re-election and serving in the 1800 session alongside Nicholas Fitzhugh.

Swann became involved in the business life of Alexandria and the new federal city across the Potomac River, as well as witnessed many real estate deeds throughout northern Virginia. In 1800, Swann became one of the directors of the Marine Insurance Company in Alexandria. In 1804, Swann published notice that he would file lawsuits against debtors owing the Mutual Assurance Society. Also in that year, Swann joined several fellow Alexandrians including fellow lawyers Charles Lee and Cuthbert Powell as well as prominent merchants Elisha Janney and William Hartshorne, among others, to form the Bank of Potomac. Four years later, in 1808, Swann joined again with Powell but now with Edmind J. Lee and others at Gadsby's Tavern to form the Alexandria Turnpike Company, in order to construct a road and bridge to Georgetown on the other side of the Potomac River. In 1810 Swann became one of the town's directors for the newly formed Farmers Bank in Alexandria, and in 1817 he became a director of the Franklin Bank in Alexandria. In 1817, the Alexandria court appointed Swann, Edmund J. Lee and Colin Auld as trustees of the failed Merchant's Bank, and in 1819 Swann became president of the Mechanics Bank of Alexandria during its reorganization. He also was one of the lawyers representing the plaintiffs in a "friendly" lawsuit filed in the U.S. District Court concerning administration of the estate of the late President George Washington, which was filed in 1823 but only settled in 1847 (long after the deaths of all but one of the original executors), following Alexandria's retrocession from the District of Columbia to Virginia mentioned below.

Meanwhile, in 1808 Swann bought a house and 262 acres in Loudoun County from Dr. Wilson Cary Selden, who had served as a surgeon during the Revolutionary War (and likely had become the namesake of Swann's first son two years earlier). Swann expanded the estate to 1400 acres and he and his son Thomas Swann Jr. operated it for decades. Swann continued to make Alexandria his primary residence for years following his wife's death, as he raised their four sons (two of whom died before 1825). In 1818, Swann was one of the Alexandrians who signed a petition for Alexandria to be retroceded from the District of Columbia and returned to Virginia, which did not happen until after his death.

Swann became the United States Attorney for the District of Columbia in 1821, and remained such until 1833, when he sold the house he had built at the corner of Columbus and Prince Streets in Alexandria. Meanwhile, his most controversial venture into banking was his election as president of the Washington Branch of the Second Bank of the United States, contrary to the wishes of Nicholas Biddle, who had supported Roger C. Weightman for that position. Swann conducted an investigation about embezzlement by a Washington branch cashier named Smith. In 1828 (when former President Monroe's property in Albemarle County was sold to satisfy his debts to the bank) Biddle convinced the other directors to replace Swann with his preferred bank president, Samuel Harrison Smith, formerly Secretary of the Treasury, as well as President of the Bank of Washington between 1809 and 1819. In 1824 Swann bought at lot at the corner of Connecticut Avenue and H Street facing Lafayette Square and the White House in the federal city, and by 1829 built a three-story house that after later extensive renovations became the home of the W.W. Corcoran family, and was ultimately demolished and replaced by the Chamber of Commerce building. However, the cost of that house, controversy between President Jackson and the Bank of the United States, and the Panic of 1837 led to financial difficulties for both Swann and his nemesis, Biddle, both of whom sold property to their sons in order to raise cash.

== Death and legacy ==
Swann died in Loudoun County in 1840, and was buried at Morven Park or at St. James Episcopal Church. Morven Park remained in the family until 1898, and a few years later was acquired by future Virginia governor Westmoreland Davis, whose widow created a foundation to operate it as a historic site and museum. His sons Dr. Wilson C. Swann and Thomas Swann Jr. became prominent Unionists (in Pennsylvania and Maryland, respectively) before and during the American Civil War. Morven Park was added to the National Register of Historic Places in 1974, and is also part of the Catoctin Rural Historic District. Swann's Alexandria House also continues to exist, again as a private residence, at 712 Prince Street and is a contributing property to its historic district. Now known as the Swann-Daingerfield House (the latter being the insurance executive to whom Swann sold the house in 1833 and who added a ballroom and whose family lived in the house until 1899), its wings were added by the "St. Mary Academy" in 1905-1906 (and used as "Carter Hall" to train nurses during World War I and after 1933, then as a dormitory) were converted into condominium apartments in the 1970s.
