= Lieutenant Governor of Maryland =

Second highest-ranking official in Maryland

- Coat of arms of the state of Maryland

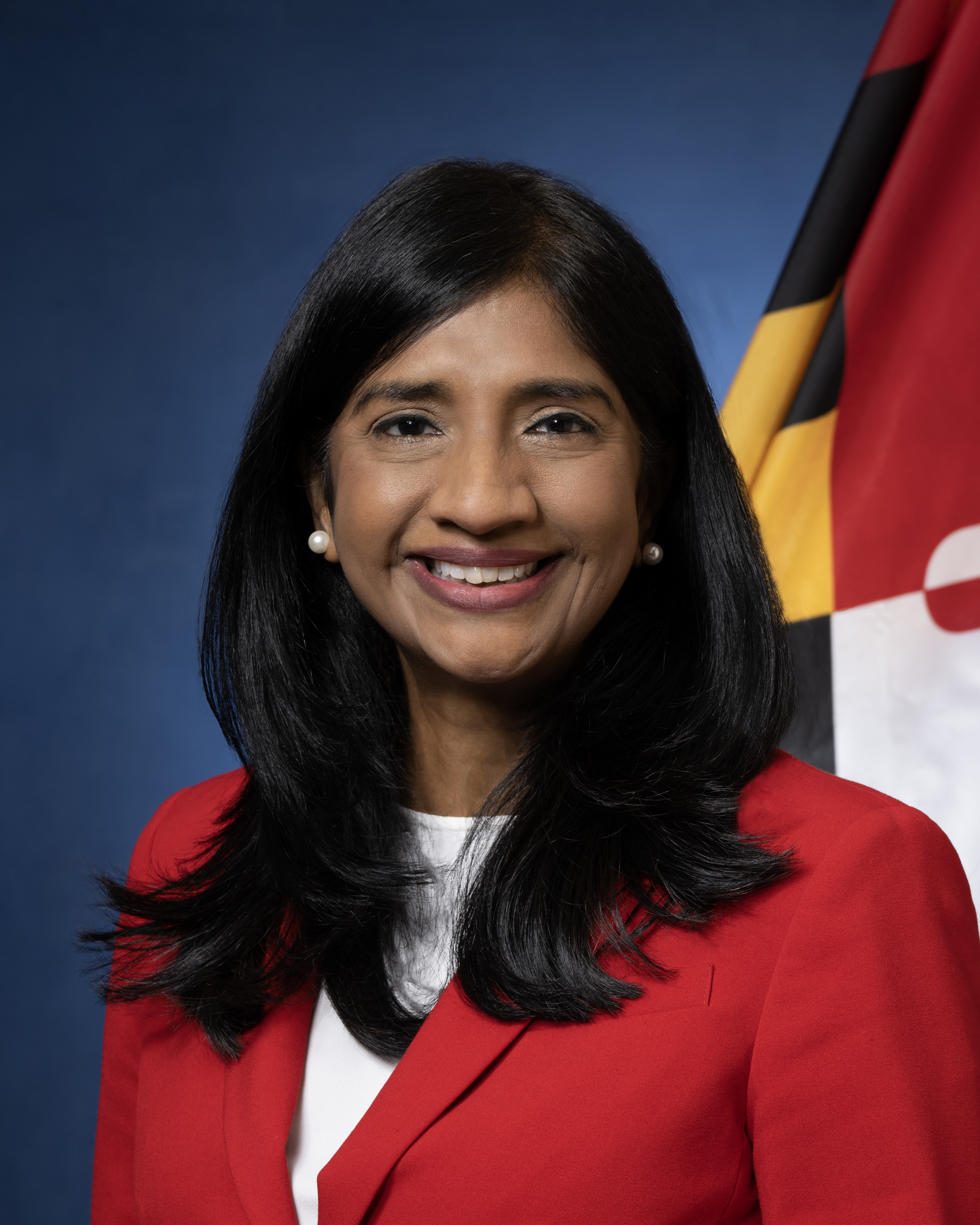
- Incumbent; Aruna Miller since January 18, 2023
- Government of Maryland
- Style: Lieutenant Governor (informal); The Honorable (formal)
- Term length: Four years, no term limit
- Inaugural holder: Christopher C. Cox
- Formation: January 1971
- Succession: First
- Website: Office of the Lieutenant Governor

The lieutenant governor of Maryland is the second highest-ranking official in the executive branch of the state government of Maryland in the United States. The officeholder is elected on the same ticket as the governor of Maryland and must meet the same qualifications.

The current lieutenant governor is Aruna Miller, who took office on January 18, 2023.

== History ==
The position was first created by the Maryland Constitution of 1864. Under that system of government, the lieutenant governor served as president of the Senate and would assume the office of governor if the incumbent should die, resign, be removed, or be disqualified.

The state's present constitution, adopted in 1867, abolished the lieutenant governorship. However, the position was re-established by a constitutional amendment ratified on November 3, 1970.

== Duties and responsibilities ==
Under the 1970 amendment, the lieutenant governor "shall have only the duties delegated to him by the governor." Maryland's lieutenant governorship is thus weaker than the office in several, but not all, other states that have one. For instance, in many states, including Texas, the lieutenant governor is the president of the state's Senate and in California the lieutenant governor assumes all of the governor's powers when the governor is out of the state. In both of those states, as in some others, the lieutenant governor is elected independently of the state's governor.

In practice, Maryland's lieutenant governor attends cabinet meetings, chairs various task forces and commissions, represents the state at ceremonial functions and at events with or without the governor, and advises the governor. If the governor dies, resigns or is removed from office (via impeachment conviction), the lieutenant governor becomes governor. A vacancy in the lieutenant governorship is filled by a person nominated by the governor and confirmed by a majority vote of the General Assembly voting in joint session.

== List of lieutenant governors ==
Parties

Unionist (1) Democratic (7) Republican (2)

=== Under the Maryland Constitution of 1864 ===
Constitution was amended to abolish the office of Lieutenant Governor after Cox's tenure.

No.	Lieutenant Governor	Party	Term
1	Christopher C. Cox	Unionist	1865–1868

=== Under the Maryland Constitution of 1867 ===
Constitution amended November 4, 1970, to re-create the office of Lieutenant Governor.

No.	Lieutenant Governor	Party	Term start	Term end	Governor
2	Blair Lee III	Democratic	January 20, 1971	January 17, 1979	Marvin Mandel
3	Samuel W. Bogley	Democratic	January 17, 1979	January 19, 1983	Harry Hughes
4	J. Joseph Curran Jr.	Democratic	January 19, 1983	January 21, 1987	Harry Hughes
5	Melvin A. Steinberg	Democratic	January 21, 1987	January 18, 1995	William D. Schaefer
6	Kathleen Kennedy Townsend	Democratic	January 18, 1995	January 15, 2003	Parris Glendening
7	Michael Steele	Republican	January 15, 2003	January 17, 2007	Bob Ehrlich
8	Anthony Brown	Democratic	January 17, 2007	January 21, 2015	Martin O'Malley
9	Boyd Rutherford	Republican	January 21, 2015	January 18, 2023	Larry Hogan
10	Aruna Miller	Democratic	January 18, 2023	Incumbent	Wes Moore

== See also ==
- Governor of Maryland
- Government of Maryland
- Lieutenant Governor (United States)
