= Constitution of Maryland =

American state constitution

The current Constitution of the State of Maryland, which was ratified by the people of the state on September 18, 1867, forms the basic law for the U.S. state of Maryland. It replaced the short-lived Maryland Constitution of 1864 and is the fourth constitution under which the state has been governed. It was last amended in 2024.

At approximately 47,000 words (including annotations), the Maryland Constitution is much longer than the average length of a state constitution in the United States, which is about 26,000 words (the United States Constitution is about 8,700 words long).

== Background, drafting, and ratification ==
Maryland had constitutional conventions in 1776 and 1850–51. The state's 1864 constitution was written in a convention during the Civil War, while the Unionists temporarily controlled Maryland. Approved by a bare majority (50.31%) of the state's eligible voters, including Maryland men who were serving in the Union army outside the state, it temporarily disfranchised the approximately 25,000 men in Maryland who had fought for the Confederacy or in other ways supported it, in an effort to bring change to the state. Also, while the state's remaining slaves were emancipated by constitutional amendment, the 1864 constitution changed the basis of representation in the General Assembly to help keep power in the hands of the white elite.

The Constitution of 1867 was drafted by a convention which met at the state capital, Annapolis, between May 8 and August 17, 1867. It was submitted to the adult white male citizens of the state for ratification on September 18 and was approved by a vote of 47,152 to 23,036. It took effect on October 5, 1867.

Maryland held a constitutional convention in 1967-68.

== Specific Provisions ==
=== Declaration of Rights ===
The Maryland Constitution begins with a Declaration of Rights, which is similar to the U.S. Bill of Rights but, like most state bills of rights, is broader than the federal version. Among other things, the Maryland Constitution guarantees trial by jury, due process, freedom of the press, and of religion. It also forbids, among other things, the passage of ex post facto laws and cruel and unusual punishment. Notably, juries in criminal cases are declared to be judges of law as well as fact, thus ensconcing in the constitution the right of (what is commonly called) jury nullification—commonplace in the early 19th century. By 1867 this principle was already in decline as a result of abuse (in such conflicts as the Mormons in Nauvoo, Illinois and the Fugitive Slave Law of 1850), and today very much the minority position. The right of the jury to be judge of the law has since been declared unconstitutional, at least with respect to matters implicating federal constitutional rights, by the Supreme Court of Maryland in Unger vs. Maryland (2012).

While the Declaration of Rights does say that "a well regulated Militia is the proper and natural defence of a free Government," it does not guarantee a right to bear arms. The Maryland Constitution is one of the few state constitutions that lacks the equivalent of the federal Second Amendment. However in incorporates the US constitution under article 2:

“ Art. 2. The Constitution of the United States, and the Laws made, or which shall be made, in pursuance thereof, and all Treaties made, or which shall be made, under the authority of the United States, are, and shall be the Supreme Law of the State; and the Judges of this State, and all the People of this State, are, and shall be bound thereby; anything in the Constitution or Law of this State to the contrary notwithstanding.”

Thus incorporating the 2nd amendment as written in the US constitution.

Reflecting Maryland's history of religious toleration, it limits the guarantee against religious disabilities to those who believe in God and divine rewards and punishments. Article 36 includes the wording:

nor shall any person, otherwise competent, be deemed incompetent as a witness, or juror, on account of his religious belief; provided, he believes in the existence of God, and that under His dispensation such person will be held morally accountable for his acts, and be rewarded or punished therefor either in this world or in the world to come.

A unanimous 1961 decision by US Supreme court in the case of Torcaso v. Watkins found that an attempt to enforce this provision violated the First and Fourteenth Amendments to the United States Constitution. In 1970, this article was amended to include the sentence "Nothing in this article shall constitute an establishment of religion". The original wording of the article was left in place, presumably as symbolic rather than effective.

Maryland's Constitution describes the separation of powers doctrine, which is implied in the federal constitution. The Maryland Constitution states that "the Legislative, Executive and Judicial powers of Government ought to be forever separate and distinct from each other; and no person exercising the functions of one of said Departments shall assume or discharge the duties of any other."

=== Elective Franchise ===
Article I defines the requirements for holding elections, the qualifications to be allowed to vote, and penalties for voter misconduct (such as intentionally voting in a district one does not reside in, or voting more than once in an election).

=== Executive Department ===
Article II creates the offices of Governor and Lieutenant Governor, establishes the qualifications for candidates, the rules for counting ballots, deciding who shall become governor or Lieutenant governor in the event of a tie, impeachment for misconduct, and the process for replacement if the office becomes vacant temporarily or permanently due to death, resignation, disability or impeachment.

=== Legislative Department ===
Article III creates the Legislature, styled the General Assembly, separated into two houses, a Senate and House of Delegates, defines the qualification and number of members of each house, the means of election and provisions for removal from office for misconduct, and process for replacement of members whose office becomes vacant.

=== Judicial Department ===
Article IV creates the Supreme Court of Maryland and various lower courts, sets the requirement for judges, length of tenure, and removal from office. It also provides for a Sheriff to be elected for each county.

=== Attorney General and State's Attorney ===
Article V creates the office of the Attorney General and a State's Attorney in each county, provides for their election, qualifications for candidates, procedure for impeachment and replacement in the event the office becomes vacant.

=== Treasury Department ===
Article VI creates a Treasury Department and establishes the procedure for appointment of a Comptroller and a Treasurer, as well as their duties, procedure for removal for misconduct and replacement if the office becomes vacant.

=== Sundry Officers ===
Article VII provides for the election of County Commissioners.

=== Education ===
Article VIII requires the legislature to establish a set of Free Public Schools, and to support them "by taxation or other means."

=== Militia and Military Affairs ===
Article IX provides for the creation of a Militia and for the appointment of an Adjutant General by the Governor to manage the Militia.

=== City of Baltimore ===
Article XI creates the City of Baltimore and deems it an independent city, and provides it with a mayor and a two-part City Council with a maximum 90 day period of operation, and provides for several additional sub-articles within article XI regarding the operation of the City.

== Amendments ==
=== Amendment process ===
Amendments to the constitution are proposed by the state legislature with a three-fifths vote in both chambers. Amendments must then be ratified by a simple majority of the people voting on the question in a referendum held simultaneously with the next general election. Unlike the federal constitution, when the Maryland Constitution is amended, the official text of the document is edited, removing language that is no longer in force. However, most printed versions of the constitution include annotations which indicate which portions were amended or removed and at what times.

A provision in the document requires that every 20 years the people of the state be asked if a state constitutional convention should be convened. Such a convention is called if a majority of the voters request it. At the latest election where this question could be asked in 2010, the voters did not choose to call a convention.

=== Notable amendments ===
While the average state constitution has been amended approximately 115 times, as of 2004, the Maryland Constitution has been amended almost 200 times, most recently in 2024. In 1910, the Digges Amendment was proposed, to increase property requirements for voter registration. It would have effectively disfranchised most African Americans and many poor whites (including recent European immigrants), as had been accomplished by other states through various means, beginning with Mississippi's new constitution of 1890. Other Maryland laws had already reduced black voter rolls, but this amendment was rejected by voters at the general election.

In 1970, voters approved an amendment that created the office of the Lieutenant Governor of Maryland. In 1972, an amendment that created the current legislative district system of the Maryland General Assembly was approved.

=== 2008 amendments ===
In 2008, two amendments were proposed on the 2008 U.S. presidential election ballot for the state of Maryland. The first amendment proposed to allow early voting in state and allow qualified voters to vote at polling places outside of their home district. The amendment was approved with 72.1% of the vote. The second amendment proposed to authorize the state to issue up to five video lottery licenses for the primary purpose of raising revenue for education of children in public schools. The amendment was approved with 58.7% of the vote.

=== 2012 amendments ===
In 2012, three constitutional amendments were proposed on the 2012 U.S. presidential election ballot for the state of Maryland. The first amendment proposed to require judges of the Orphans' Court for Prince George's County to have a Maryland state law license and to be a current member of the Maryland Bar Association. The amendment was approved with 87.8% of the vote. The second amendment proposed to require judges of the Orphans' Court for Baltimore County to have a Maryland state law license and to be a current member of the Maryland Bar. The amendment was approved with 88.1% of the vote. The third amendment proposed to change the point at which an elected official charged with certain crimes is suspended or removed from office. Under the amended law, an elected official would be suspended when found guilty and removed when the conviction becomes final or when pleading guilty or no contest. The amendment was approved with 88% of the vote.

=== 2024 amendments ===
In 2024, Maryland residents overwhelmingly approved a constitutional provision recognising abortion access within the state.

== See also ==
- Government of Maryland
- History of Maryland
- Maryland Constitution of 1864
