= Raid on the New York Battery =

One of the opening Raids of the American Revolutionary War

- Part of the American Revolutionary War
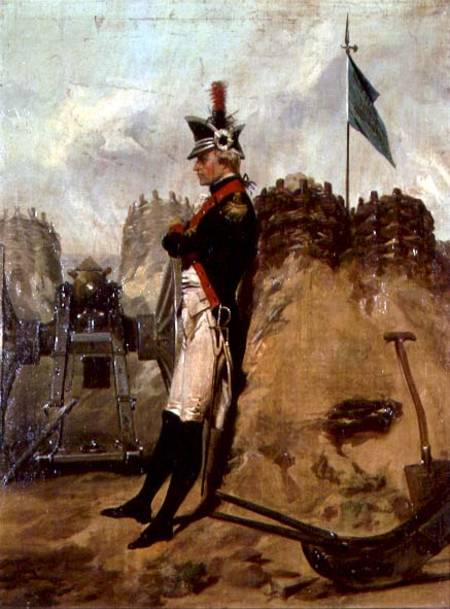
- Alexander Hamilton in uniform at the New York Battery, painting by Alonzo Chappel
Date	August 23, 1775
Location	New York Battery; 40.702389°N 74.016472°W
Result	American patriot victory: Part of the beginning of the American Revolutionary War

Belligerents
New England Colonies (before May 1775): New York Colony; United Colonies (after May 1775)	Great Britain

Commanders and leaders
Alexander Hamilton; John Lamb; Hearts of Oak militia Sons of Liberty	Captain George Vandeput

Strength
unknown	HMS Asia

Casualties and losses
Three citizens wounded	1 sailor killed

Raid on the New York Battery was a raid by the Sons of Liberty and Hearts of Oak militia on August 23, 1775, in the early days of the American Revolutionary War. The raid was on the British cannons in New York City. The 21 royal cannons from the New York Battery were taken under fire from the ship HMS Asia offshore. The cannons became a target for American patriots shortly after the outbreak of the Revolutionary War on April 19, 1775. The seizure of the cannons helped the patriots of the Revolutionary War.

== Raid ==
The cannon raid followed the Battles of Lexington and Concord on April 19, 1775, which was the first major military action between the Kingdom of Great Britain's British Army and Patriot militias of the Thirteen Colonies. The citizens of New York heard of the Battles of Lexington and Concord from a letter from Stephen Hopkins, which arrived in New York from Providence, Rhode Island on April 23, 1775. Stephen Hopkins wrote that the British army had …engaged in butchering and destroying our brethren in the most inhuman manner. The Battles of Lexington and Concord angered many New York City residents. The anger rose, and rioting started in the city. To arm themselves against British forces, the New York City British cannons were taken.

HMS Asia fired grapeshot and cannonballs on the city of New York in the night, as the Sons of Liberty under the leadership of Alexander Hamilton and John Lamb removed the 21 royal cannons from the New York Battery. Asia was used as a British cargo ship and troop transport ship in the American Revolutionary War. Alexander Hamilton removed the 21 cannons, as the New York Provincial Congress had ordered, because they were a threat to the new American patriots. The Sons of Liberty returned cannon fire on Asia, killing one of the ship's crew members. Asia's cannon fire hit homes in the city, near the New York Battery, wounding three citizens. The cannon fire put much of the city into a panic, with some departing the city and heading to the safety of the nearby countryside. All the New York Battery cannons were removed and later were used by the Continental Army's New York Provincial Company of Artillery, today called the Regular Army's 1st Battalion, 5th Field Artillery) Asia was a 1764, 64-gun third-rate ship of the line of the Royal Navy, built by Thomas Bucknall. Asia's captain was George Vandeput. On August 24, 1775, the British governor William Tryon arranged a meeting between the patriot local officials and Captain Vandeput, which calmed the patriots and eased fears of further attacks. Tryon was later removed from his position by the New York Provincial Congress.

== Aftermath ==
The Raid on the New York Battery, in addition to the April 23, 1775 New York Armory Raid, and the June 6, 1775 Broad Street Raid both intensified tensions in the city and gave patriots needed supplies used later in the American Revolutionary War. On July 20, 1775, Patriots seized British supplies in Turtle Bay, New York in the Capture of Turtle Bay Depot.

== Location ==
The New York Battery is located at the mouth of the Hudson River, at the south tip of Manhattan Island. Today, the Battery Park area has memorials to a number of Revolutionary War actions.

== See also ==
- New York and New Jersey campaigns (1776–1777)
- Boston campaign
- Capture of Turtle Bay Depot
- Harbor Defenses of New York
- List of American Revolutionary War battles
