= Broad Street Incident =

One of the opening Raids of the American Revolutionary War

- Part of the American Revolutionary War
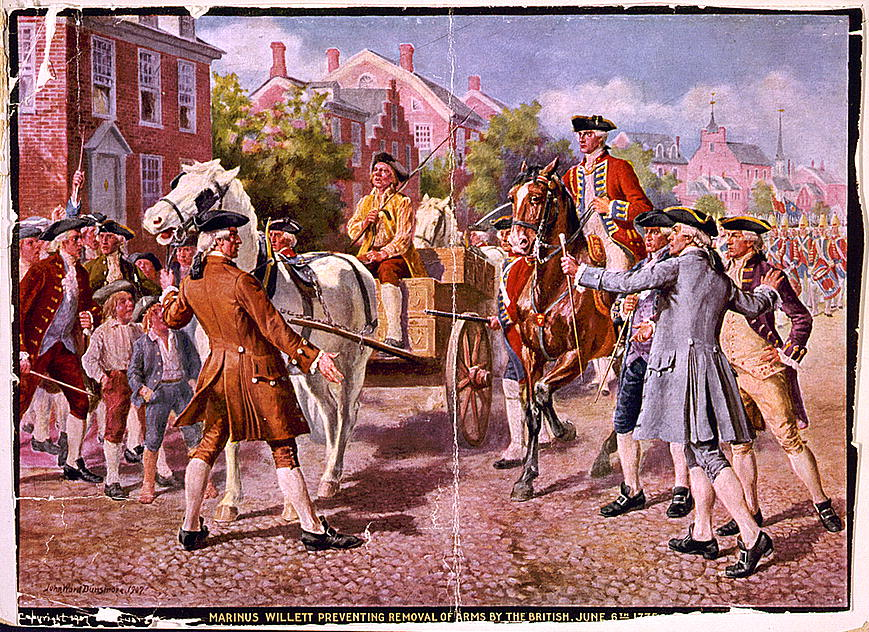
- John Ward Dunsmore’s 1907 Paintings "Marinus Willett Preventing Removal of Arms by the British, June 6th, 1775"
Date	June 6, 1775
Location	Broad Street; New York City; 40.705139°N 74.011500°W
Result	American patriot victory: Part of the beginning of the American Revolutionary War

Belligerents
New England Colonies (before May 1775): New York Colony; United Colonies (after May 1775)	Great Britain

Commanders and leaders
Liberty Boys; Sons of Liberty; Marinus Willett; John Morin Scott; Hearts of Oak militia	Major Isaac Hamilton

Strength
unknown	~200 Five companies of British 18th Royal Irish Regiment

Casualties and losses
0	0

Broad Street Incident was a raid by the Sons of Liberty on June 6, 1775, in the early days of the American Revolutionary War. The raid was on the British soldiers' cannons, munitions and military supplies from New York City. A five-wagon British military supply convoy became a target for American patriots shortly after the outbreak of the Revolutionary War on April 19, 1775. The seizure of the arm helped the patriots of the Revolutionary War.

== Raid ==
The raid followed the Battles of Lexington and Concord on April 19, 1775, which was the first major military action between the Kingdom of Great Britain's British Army and Patriot militias of the Thirteen Colonies. The citizens of New York heard of the Battles of Lexington and Concord from a letter from Stephen Hopkins, which arrived in New York from Providence, Rhode Island on April 23, 1775. Stephen Hopkins wrote that the British army had …engaged in butchering and destroying our brethren in the most inhuman manner. The Battles of Lexington and Concord angered many New York City residents. The anger rose, and rioting started in the city. To arm themselves against British forces, the New York City British armory was stormed on April 23, 1775, in the New York Armory Raid. After the New York Armory Raid, a New York hundred-patriot citizens' committee took over the affairs of New York, and the British New York Provincial Assembly was disbanded.

On May 7, 1775, Lt. General Thomas Gage in Boston wrote Major Isaac Hamilton, the commander of the five companies of the 18th Regiment of Foot, Royal Irish Regiment, stationed in New York City recommending that, because of the recent civil disturbances in New York, that Hamilton place his command on the HMS Asia under Commander George Vandeput due to arrive later that month, and on which Gage's letter was sent. The Asia was a 1764, 64-gun third-rate ship of the line of the Royal Navy, built by Thomas Bucknall and used as a cargo ship and troop transport ship in the American Revolutionary War.

On May 26, 1775, the day the Asia arrived with Gage's letter, Hamilton wrote New York Lieutenant Governor Cadwallader Colden enclosing a copy of General Gage's letter and advising Colden of his own concern with increasing desertions from his small command. Although inclined to follow General Gage's instructions, he also wished to consult with the civil authority. However, ten days later on June 5, 1775, Hamilton again wrote Colden advising him he had asked Commander Vandeput for permission to move his command to the Asia the following day.

On June 6, 1775, the five companies of the 18th Regiment, approximately 200-strong, accompanied by Mayor Whitehead Hicks, the New York Recorder Robert R. Livingston, and several magistrates departed from the Upper Barracks near the commons for the Asia with five wagons carrying the Regiment's baggage and arms. The procession made its way down Broad Street to the New York Harbor.

Seeing the wagons heading to the docks, Marinus Willett, a prominent member of the New York Sons of Liberty, went to the Tontine Coffee House and then the Merchants Exchange a few blocks away sending out a call to action to the Hearts of Oak militia and the Sons of Liberty. Willett then confronted Mayor Hicks, who was talking with Major Hamilton near Broad Street's intersection with Beaver Street. Willett and John Morin Scott stopped the horses of the lead wagon. Scott reminded the troops that the citizens' committee had given no permission to remove any New York arms. With Willett, Scott, and many Sons of Liberty and other patriot citizens. the crowd now outnumbered the troops allowing the patriots to take the wagons with no resistance.

According to Major Hamilton, "the carts on which our baggage was loaded, were forcibly carried off by a body of people, the trucks and packages, in violation of all faith broke open, their contents Examined, and upwards of 100 stands of arms together with several of the absent officer's fusils" were taken. "The interruption of our baggage occasioned us to make a halt in the street, when some of the apparent leaders among the people harranged our Men, and publickly encouraged them to forfeit their allegiance to which they had solemnly sworn, and desert the service they had engaged in."

The seized military supplies and baggage were taken up Beaver Street where they were placed in a warehouse to the cheers of the gathered crowd. On June 8, 1775, Major Hamilton reported to Governor Colden that "[t]he private property of the officers has been restored to them, in the mutilated disorderly condition I have just mentioned, as well as the Regimental Cloathing but the arms and accoutrements are still in their possession . . ."

== Aftermath ==
The April 23, 1775, and the June 6, 1775, raids intensified tensions in the city and inspired other raids. On July 20, 1775, Patriots seized British supplies in Turtle Bay, New York in the Capture of Turtle Bay Depot. These two raids marked a turning point in New York from moderate negotiation to radical direct action. The supplies of the two raids were later used in the American Revolutionary War. The seized arms were used to arm the first Continental troops raised in New York by order of the Continental Congress. These raids, along with the Battles of Lexington and Concord, marked the beginning of British aggression and fueled the armed revolution. George Washington arrived in New York on June 25 from Mount Vernon, he addressed the New York Colony Congress and continued on to Cambridge.

== Location ==
The intersection of Broad Street and Beaver Street is in lower Manhattan, about 6 blocks from the harbor. The area today is known as the New York Manhattan Financial District, as Wall Street is just a few blocks north of Broad Street and Beaver Street. The Tontine Coffee House was at 88 Wall Street, and the Merchants Exchange was near Broad Street and Water Street.

== See also ==
- New York Tea Party
- Raid on the New York Battery
- New York and New Jersey campaigns (1776–1777)
- Boston campaign
- Capture of Turtle Bay Depot
- List of American Revolutionary War battles
