= New York Tea Party =

1774 American protest against British taxation

- Part of the American Revolution
- New York Tea Party, an engraving: John Lamb, a Sons of Liberty leader, read the Tea Act to a crowd in New York City Hall on December 17, 1773, by John Karst (1836-1922)
- Date: April 18, 1774; 252 years ago
- Location: New York City, Province of New York, British America
- Caused by: Tea Act
- Goals: To protest British Parliament's tax on tea. "No taxation without representation."
- Methods: Both rejected tea and throwing the tea into New York Harbor
- Result: Intolerable Acts and more Patriots

Parties
Liberty Boys; Sons of Liberty New England Colonies (before May 1775): New York Colony	(Kingdom of Great Britain) Great Britain: East India Company; Parliament

Lead figures
Isaac Sears; Alexander McDougall; John Lamb and other "Sons of Liberty"...	New York Governor William Tryon; Captain Lockye; Captain Chambers

1774 New York Vigilance Committee tea handbill

The New York Tea Party, was a New York Liberty Boys event that took place on April 18, 1774 in New York City. A second New York Tea Party took place on April 22, 1774. Both New York events occurred after the larger, well-known Boston Tea Party on December 16, 1773, in Boston, Massachusetts. The "Tea Parties" were in response to the passing of the British Tea Act of 1773. Like the Boston Tea Party, the New York Tea Party events were a precursor to the outbreak of the American Revolutionary War on April 19, 1775.

== Background ==
After the passing of the British Tea Act of 1773, there were many protests in the New England Colonies. It was not just the tea tax that caused the protests. The New England Colonies were still having economic problems from the Seven Years' War. The Seven Years' War was fought from 1756 to 1763. It was a global war, but there were many subsidiary campaigns in North America. As the war ended, the Colonies had a surplus of goods with no buyers. Also, with the post-war debt, Britain increased taxation on the American colonies. British taxation was also needed to support the many British troops in the colonies, who were stationed there due to the threat posed by the French to the north and Spain to the south. British taxation increased each year with new acts: Sugar Act of 1764, Stamp Act of 1765, and Townshend Acts of 1767. The Tea Act of 1773, passed on May 10, 1773, was viewed by the many American colonies as one tax too far and not tolerable. The Tea Act of 1773 also granted the British East India Company a monopoly in the American colonies, which would increase the cost of tea, cutting out competing Dutch tea ships. The British East India Company's monopoly also affected the prices of products such as silk, cotton fabrics, spices, and chinaware. The New-York Gazette published the text of the Tea Act of 1773 on September 6, 1773. Also, in the New-York Gazette was the report that British East India Company had over 600 chests of tea on the way to New York City, on the ship Nancy. The British Indemnity Act of 1767 had lowered taxes on the East India Company when they imported tea into Britain and then re-exported this tea to the colonies. The Tea Act of 1773 increased the cost of monopoly tea. Thus, the Sons of Liberty viewed the Tea Act as a violation of the Indemnity Act. The Sons of Liberty leaders, Isaac Sears and Alexander McDougall, put out the word that no British East India Company tea was to make port, and they formed the New York Committee of Vigilance. October 28th, 1773, in the New York Journal, Hampden (pseudonym Alexander McDougall used) wrote if you receive the portion [of tea] designed for this city, you will in future have an India warehouse here; and the trade of all the commodities of that country will be lost to your merchants and be carried on by the Company, which will be an immense loss to the colony. All this news on British East India Company tea and Tea Act of 1773, brought together many New York patriots, with 200 merchants, lawyers, and citizens making a petition against the importation of any British East India Company tea, calling the Tea Act of 1773 economic "slavery". The petition also stated it shall be deemed an enemy to the liberties of America.. The New York Patriots' petition was signed on December 15, 1773.

"execution of that Act, involves our slavery, and would sap the foundation of our freedom, whereby we should become slaves to our brethren...born to no greater stock of freedom than the Americans-the merchants and inhabitants of this city, in conjunction with the merchants and inhabitants of the ancient American colonies, entered into an agreement to decline a part of their commerce with Great Britain, until the above-mentioned Act should be totally repealed.”

— December 15, 1773 petition against British Tea, by The Association of the Sons of Liberty

On December 17, 1773, John Lamb, a Sons of Liberty leader, read the Tea Act to a crowd in New York City Hall. The anger of the New York City patriots rose and about 3,000 joined together at New York City Hall (later called Federal Hall), on Friday evening, December 17, 1773. The crowd elected a New York Committee of Correspondence and as its leaders: Alexander McDougall, Isaac Sears, and John Lamb. The crowd pledged to use force if necessary to protest the East India Company Tea and the Tea Act. Later, on January 20, 1774, a formal resolution establishing the New York Committee of Correspondence was written, in response to the December 17, 1773, election. The crowd did not know that the day before, on Thursday night, December 16, 1773, the Boston Tea Party had dumped 342 crates of East India Company tea into Boston harbor. The news of the Boston Tea Party was brought to New York City on December 20, 1773, by Paul Revere. Revere then continued to spread news of the Boston Tea Party on his way to Philadelphia. As news of the Boston Tea Party reached other cities in the colonies, more East India Company tea was dumped into colonial harbors or burned. There were about 17 "tea parties", including Charleston led by Christopher Gadsden, Lexington, Massachusetts, Provincetown, Massachusetts, Princeton, New Jersey, Annapolis, Maryland, Yorktown, Virginia and Greenwich, New Jersey.

After news of the Boston Tea Party reached New York, New York Governor William Tryon became concerned about the East India Company tea on its way to New York City on the ship Nancy. Tryon wrote William Legge, the 2nd Earl of Dartmouth, who was serving as Secretary of State for the American Colonies in England: the landing, storing & safe keeping of the Tea when stored could be accomplished under the Protection of the Point of the Bayonet and Muzzle of the Cannon…. Tryon, not wanting a riot, decided not to send troops to protect the tea cargo of the Nancy. The Nancy was delayed by Atlantic Ocean storms and did not arrive in New York until April 22, 1774, which was a long wait for the New York City patriots.

== Nancy Party ==
After a delayed voyage, the cargo ship Nancy, landed on Sandy Hook, New Jersey, just south of New York City on April 18, 1774. Nancy was loaded with 200,000 pounds of East India Company tea in 698 chests (two times as much as the tea at the Boston Tea Party). The Sons of Liberty sent a letter to the Captain of the Nancy, Captain Lockye, warning of the danger he faced if he landed his ship in New York to unload his cargo. The letter told him "of the determined Revolution of the Citizens not to suffer the Tea on board of his Ship to be landed." The letter told the captain to return to England. The New York ship pilot refused to take the ship into the New York docks for unloading. The Sons of Liberty chained and locked smaller boats around the Nancy to keep the ship's crew on board for the return trip. Captain Lockye was taken into New York City, and after discussions, he agreed to return his tea to London. New York City Lawyer, Henry White Esq, the 4th President of the New York Chamber of Commerce, was the agent who was to receive the tea, see the situation refused the shipment. Captain Lockye loaded the Nancy with the food and water needed for the return trip and sailed back to London.

== London party ==
On April 22, 1774, the cargo ship London arrived in New York City from London, England. The London's Captain was Captain Chambers, who claimed that he had no tea on his ship. But the New York Sons of Liberty heard from the Philadelphia Sons of Liberty that there was hidden tea on the ship. The Sons of Liberty searched the ship and found the Captain's hidden cache of smuggled tea, 18 chests. The New York Sons of Liberty were now able to have their Boston Tea Party. The tea was dumped into New York Harbor, and wooden tea chests were taken into the city and set ablaze to celebrate the find and victory. For his treachery, Captain Chambers' life was threatened, but he was able to escape and boarded the Nancy that was still in New York. Out of fear, he did not return to his ship, the London, but returned to England on the Nancy with Captain Lockyer.

== Aftermath ==
By the end of 1774, after meetings between the Sons of Liberty and Governor Tryon, there was a consensus that no more East India Company tea would enter New York City. Also, out of kindness, British were allow to restock supplies from the city. There was still a demand for tea, and thus Holland, and West Indies Dutch tea (Bohea tea) was smuggled, to avoid taxation, into New York, Philadelphia, and Boston. Smuggling tea into New York City was easy, as there was so much waterfront nearby. The Tea Party protests created a response from the British Parliament, which passed the Coercive Acts of 1774, which were a series of punitive laws, also called the Intolerable Acts. These Acts only angered the colonists into more protests, which led to the creation of the First Continental Congress. New York City remained a strong Loyalist city but also had many active patriots. Later, General George Washington founded spies in New York City, called the Culper Ring. They operated during the Revolutionary War during the British occupation of New York City. After the New York Tea Party, New York American patriots continued to moderate negotiations with the British Crown. The major division and debate in the city was how much the city's merchants should support the British troops stationed in New York and Boston. This debate started to divide the city into patriots and loyalists. These negotiations continued until the outbreak of the American Revolutionary War on April 19, 1775. The war started with the Battles of Lexington and Concord on April 19, 1775, which was the first major military action between the Kingdom of Great Britain's British Army and Patriot militias of the Thirteen Colonies. The New York Tea Party was an important event, as New York City was a major city and hub of commerce. The New York Tea Party helped the New York Sons of Liberty become more active and stronger. This was demonstrated as soon as the Revolutionary War broke out. New York Sons of Liberty helped acquire many arms for the new nation's army and militia. These arms were acquired by the New York Sons of Liberty were from a series of raids: New York Armory Raid on April 23, 1775; Broad Street Incident on June 6, 1775; Capture of Turtle Bay Depot on July 20, 1775; and Raid on the New York Battery on August 23, 1775. New York also created an early militia the, Hearts of Oak New York militia, created in April of 1775.

== See also ==
- New York and New Jersey campaigns (1776–1777)
- Boston campaign
- Harbor Defenses of New York
- List of American Revolutionary War battles
