= Capture of Turtle Bay Depot =

One of the opening action of the American Revolutionary War

Coordinates: 40.7490°N 73.968°W

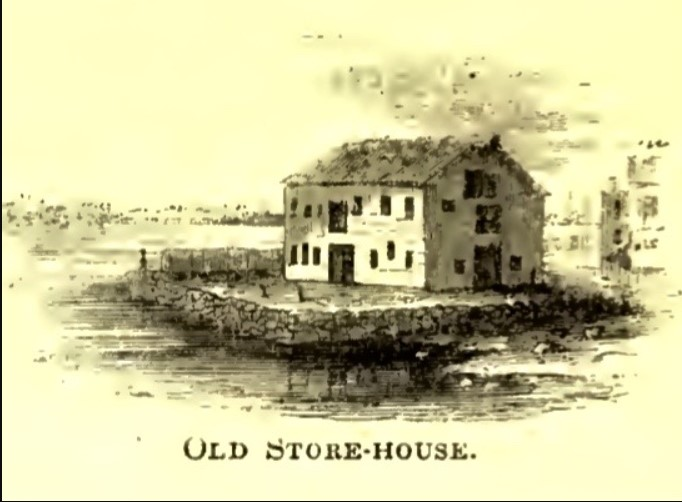
- Turtle Bay Storehouse
Date	July 20, 1775
Location	Turtle Bay, Manhattan
Result	American Patriot Victory

Belligerents
New England Colonies (before May 1775): New York Colony; Sons of Liberty; Hearts of Oak; United Colonies (after May 1775)	Great Britain

Commanders and leaders
Marinus Willett; John Lamb (general); Isaac Sears; Alexander McDougall	None

The Capture of Turtle Bay Depot was a military raid that took place in the early American Revolutionary War on July 20, 1775. The raid was on Turtle Bay Depot, a British magazine and storehouse.

On the night of July 20, 1775, a raid, conducted by the Sons of Liberty and led by Marinus Willett, John Lamb, Isaac Sears, and Alexander McDougall, attacked the Turtle Bay Depot in Manhattan, New York. The raiders also seized the British ship HMS Asia. HMS Asia was a 64-gun third-rate ship of the line of the Royal Navy, built by Thomas Bucknall. Asia was used as a cargo ship and troop transport ship in the American Revolutionary War.

The Sons of Liberty then sent the stores to Boston, patriots on Lake Champlain, and Fort Ticonderoga. After the capture of Turtle Bay Depot, the patriots established Turtle Bay Redoubt, an earthwork that was located on the site that would become the Headquarters of the United Nations.

The capture followed the Battles of Lexington and Concord on April 19, 1775, which was the first major military action between the Kingdom of Great Britain's British Army and Patriot militias of the Thirteen Colonies. The battles of Lexington and Concord ended the moderate negotiation and transitioned to radical direct action against Great Britain.

== See also ==
- New York Tea Party
- New York and New Jersey campaigns (1776–1777)
- Boston campaign
- New York Armory Raid
- List of American Revolutionary War battles
