= Hearts of Oak (militia) =

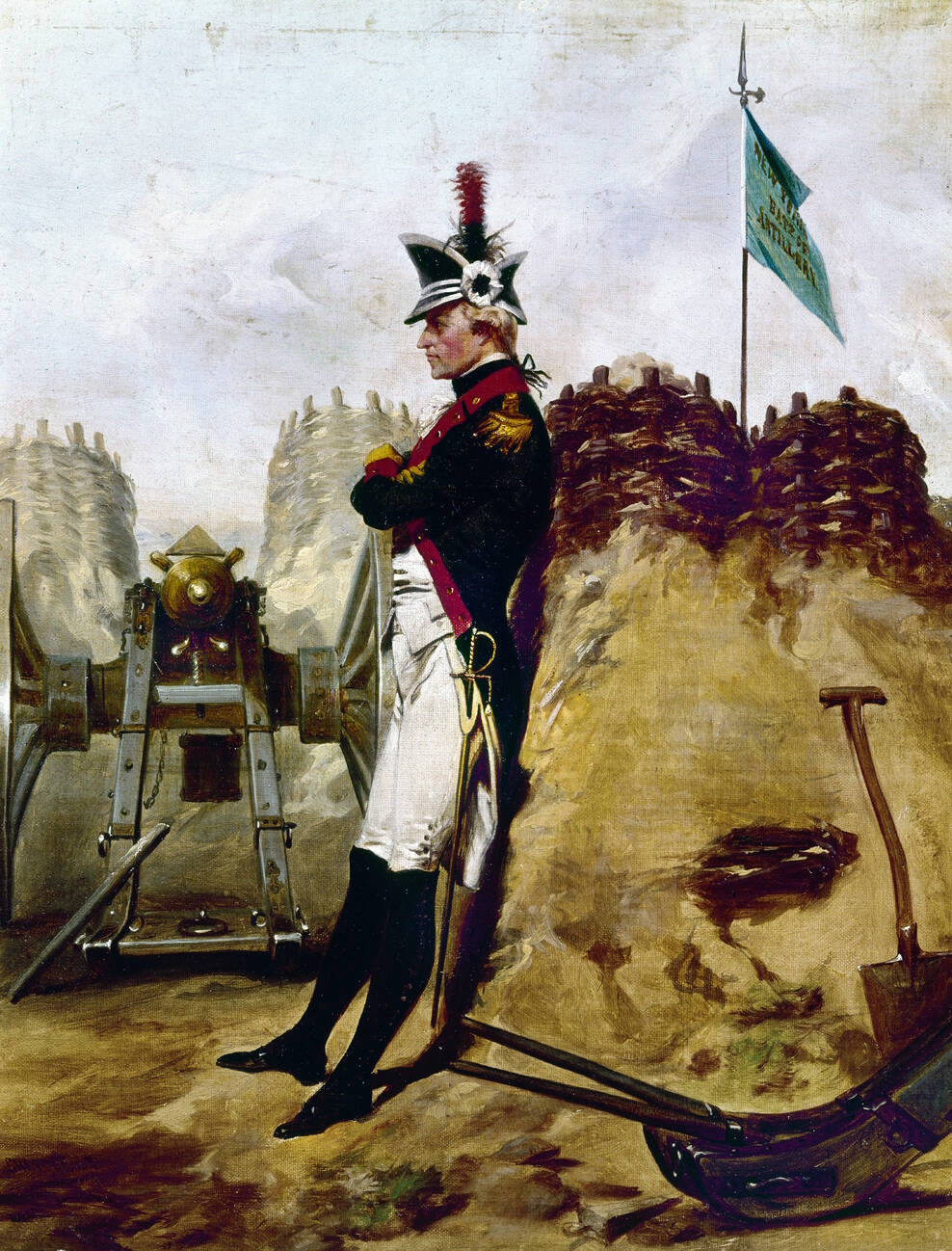
- Alexander Hamilton in the Uniform of the New York Artillery, by Alonzo Chappel
- Active: 1775–1776
- Allegiance: Province of New York (later – State of New York)
- Branch: army
- Type: militia
- Role: coastal artillery, field artillery
- Size: 60
- Part of: New York Militia
- Nickname: The Corsicans
- Mottos: "God and Our Right"
- Colors: Green and red
- Engagements: American Revolution

Commanders
- Notable commanders: Alexander Hamilton Nicholas Fish Robert Troup

The Hearts of Oak were a volunteer militia based in the British colonial Province of New York and formed circa 1775 in New York City. The original name was evidently adopted in emulation of the enlightened Corsican Republic, headed by Pasquale Paoli, which had been suppressed six years before, and which got considerable sympathy in Britain and its colonies.

Militia members were primarily students at King's College, later renamed Columbia University, including Nicholas Fish, Robert Troup and Alexander Hamilton. The company drilled in the graveyard of nearby St. Paul's Chapel before classes in uniforms they designed themselves, consisting of short green tight-fitting jackets, a round leather hat with a cockade and the phrase "Liberty or Death" on the band, and a badge of red tin hearts on their jackets with the words "God and Our Right", which was the motto Dieu et mon droit translated into English and adapted to make its possessive pronoun plural.

In August 1775, the Hearts of Oak participated in a successful raid, while under fire from HMS Asia, to seize cannon from the Battery, thereby becoming an artillery unit thereafter.

In 1776, Hamilton was given a commission as a Captain by the revolutionary New York Provincial Congress with instructions to raise the New York Provincial Company of Artillery, which later became the U.S. Army's 5th Field Artillery Regiment, and the mission to protect Manhattan Island. The Hearts of Oak formed its core.

In 2015, a supporters group for a Major League Soccer team, New York City FC, took up the name Hearts of Oak in tribute to Alexander Hamilton and his defenders of New York City.

== See also ==
- New York and New Jersey campaigns (1776–1777)
- Landing at Kip's Bay
- Capture of Turtle Bay Depot
- Broad Street Incident
- New York Armory Raid
- List of American Revolutionary War battles
