= New York Armory Raid =

Opening Raid of the American Revolutionary War

- Part of the American Revolutionary War
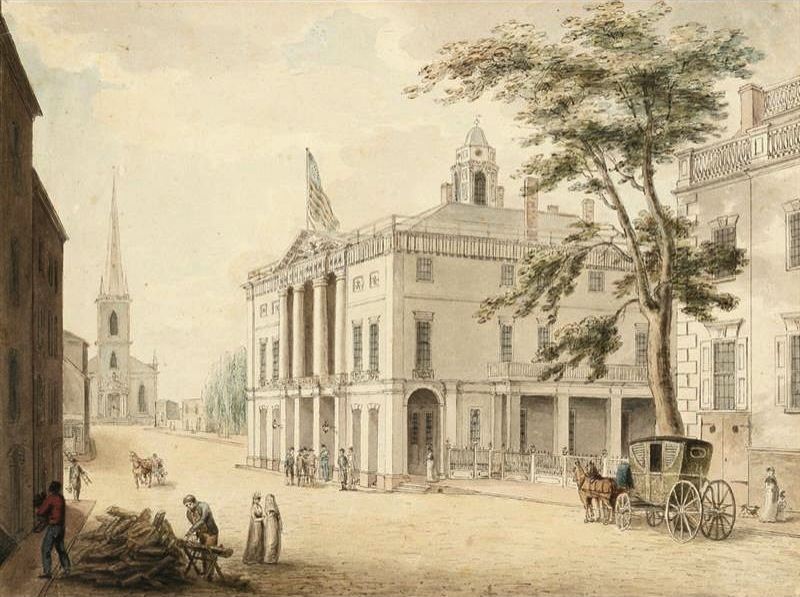
- Old New York City Hall, then the old Federal Hall on Wall Street, by Archibald Robertson, site of the New York Armory Raid on April 23, 1775
Date	April 23, 1775
Location	Old New York City Hall (now Federal Hall); New York City; 40.70719°N 74.010639°W
Result	American patriot victory: Part of the beginning of the American Revolutionary War

Belligerents
New England Colonies (before May 1775): New York Colony; United Colonies (after May 1775)	Great Britain

Commanders and leaders
Sons of Liberty; Marinus Willett; Isaac Sears	Major Isaac Hamilton

Strength
unknown	100

Casualties and losses
0	0

New York Armory Raid was an action by Sons of Liberty on April 23, 1775, in the early days of the American Revolutionary War. The raid was on the British soldiers' munitions, military supplies and stores held in New York City. The armory became a target for American patriots shortly after the outbreak of the Revolutionary War on April 19, 1775.

== Raid ==
The raid followed the Battles of Lexington and Concord on April 19, 1775, which was the first major military action between the Kingdom of Great Britain's British Army and Patriot militias of the Thirteen Colonies. The citizens of New York heard of the Battles of Lexington and Concord from a letter from Stephen Hopkins, which arrived in New York from Providence, Rhode Island on, Sunday, April 23, 1775. Stephen Hopkins wrote that the British army had …engaged in butchering and destroying our brethren in the most inhuman manner. The Battles of Lexington and Concord angered many New York City residents. The anger rose, and rioting started in the city. To arm themselves against British forces, the New York City armory was stormed. The Patriots captured 600 muskets, bayonets, and cartridge boxes from the armory located at New York City Hall. Two of the leaders of the Sons of Liberty raid were Marinus Willett and Isaac Sears, leaders in Province of New York. This raid, along with the Battles of Lexington and Concord, marked the beginning of British aggression and fueled the armed revolution. While Patriot colonists seized military supplies to fuel the rebellion, many New Yorkers feared an open rebellion, as a British garrison of about 100 soldiers was stationed in New York City. The British garrison was under the leadership of Major Isaac Hamilton. New York, especially Long Island and upstate in Tryon County, remained mainly a Loyalist town supporting the King. Yet there was support in New York for the Sons of Liberty; many supported the boycotts of British goods and set up liberty poles. In New York, in response to the British, New Yorkers started a Committee of Correspondence to coordinate resistance against British rule and to coordinate rebels in the other colonies. New York citizen rebels discussed attacking Isaac Hamilton's British garrison, but did not. In the Patriot New Yorker's anger did lead to an attack on the leader of a loyalist newspaper, James Rivington, who published a very pro-British rule paper, the Rivington's Gazette. The Rivington's Gazette shop was burned and looted by the Sons of Liberty. Rivington fled to England, but returned in 1777 and started a new paper. The group also attacked Myles Cooper, the President of King's College, who escaped after receiving an advanced warning.

== Aftermath ==
The April 23, 1775, raid intensified tensions in the city and inspired other raids. On July 20, 1775, Patriots seized British supplies in Turtle Bay, New York in the Capture of Turtle Bay Depot. These two raids marked a turning point in New York from moderate negotiation to radical direct action. The raid also led to the end of the British New York Provincial Assembly, with its last meeting on April 3. This was replaced by the Committee of Sixty, which called for the election of the Provincial Congress. The New York militia, Hearts of Oak was formed with John Broome as its leader. The Provincial Congress held its first meeting on May 22, 1775. The supplies of the New York Armory Raid were later used in the American Revolutionary War. When British forces stationed in the New York attempted to load a convoy of British military supplies onto the Asia on June 6, 1775 Marinus Willett and the Sons of Sons of Liberty confiscated the British military supplies, called the Broad Street Incident.

== Location ==
The site of the New York City Hall (Old City Hall) that was raided is currently at the intersection of Wall Street and Nassau Street in Lower Manhattan. The Old City Hall, New York's second city hall, was built in 1703 and torn down in 1812, it was also used as the British Custom House. The Old City Hall, which was raided, also housed the 1765 Stamp Act Congress. Later, after the American Revolutionary War, the Old City Hall served as the meeting hall of the Congress of the Confederation from 1785 to 1789. To house the new government, the hall was expanded and updated. The expanded hall housed the 1st Congress and the inauguration of George Washington in 1789. The site now houses the Federal Hall building, designed by architects Ithiel Town and Alexander Jackson Davis. Federal Hall was constructed between 1834 and 1842. The Greek Revival style Federal Hall was used as the U.S. Custom House and is now the Federal Hall National Memorial.

== See also ==
- New York Tea Party
- Raid on the New York Battery
- New York and New Jersey campaigns (1776–1777)
- Boston campaign
- Broad Street Incident
- National Historic Landmarks in New York City
- National Register of Historic Places listings in Manhattan below 14th Street
- List of American Revolutionary War battles
