= Robert Troup =

American judge

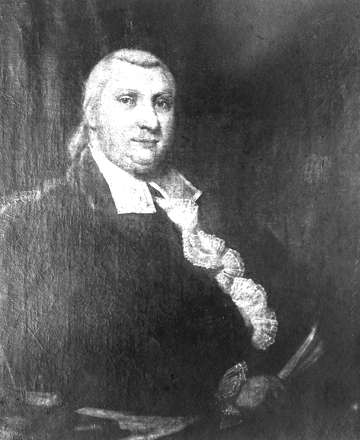
- A late 18th century portrait of Troup

Judge of the United States District Court for the District of New York
- In office December 10, 1796 – April 4, 1798
- Appointed by: George Washington
- Preceded by: John Laurance
- Succeeded by: John Sloss Hobart

Personal details
- Born: Robert Troup; 1757 Elizabethtown, Province of New Jersey, British America
- Died: January 14, 1832 (aged 74–75) New York City, New York, U.S.
- Resting place: Green-Wood Cemetery, Brooklyn, New York, U.S.
- Spouse: Jannetje Goelet
- Education: Columbia University read law

Military service
- Allegiance: United States
- Branch/service: Continental Army
- Years of service: 1775–1780
- Rank: Lieutenant Colonel
- Unit: Hearts of Oak
- Battles/wars: Battles of Saratoga

Robert Troup (1757 – January 14, 1832) was a soldier in the Continental Army during the American Revolutionary War and a United States district judge for the United States District Court for the District of New York. He participated in the Battles of Saratoga and was present at the surrender of British General John Burgoyne.

== Early life and education ==
Troup was born in 1757, in Elizabethtown, in the Province of New Jersey in colonial-era British America. He graduated from King's College, later renamed Columbia University, in 1774, and read law, with John Jay. As a King's College student, he was the roommate of Alexander Hamilton.

== Career ==
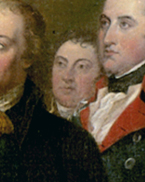
Troup (center) in Surrender of General Burgoyne, a portrait by John Trumbull, which now is on display in the United States Capitol rotunda in Washington, D.C.

At the start of the American Revolutionary War, Troup joined the Hearts of Oak, a volunteer infantry unit of the New York militia. He entered as a second lieutenant in 1775, serving alongside two fellow King's College students, Alexander Hamilton and Nicholas Fish. In May 1776, Troup was a first lieutenant in Colonel John Lasher's regiment. The Hearts of Oak became part of the Continental Army that year, forming the core of the New York Provincial Company of Artillery.

On August 27, 1776, while serving under General Nathaniel Woodhull during the Battle of Long Island, Troup was captured by the British near Brooklyn. He was confined to the prison ship HMS Jersey, and later was transferred to the Provost Prison in New York until his exchange on December 9, 1776.

Troup rejoined the Continental Army in New Jersey, becoming captain of the New York Artillery's 2nd Regiment, and was promoted to major in February 1777.

In August 1777, he became aide-de-camp to General Horatio Gates, and received a commission as lieutenant colonel on October 4, 1777. As aide to Gates, he served in the Battles of Saratoga and the final surrender of General John Burgoyne at Schuylerville, New York, on October 17. He was depicted in Surrender of General Burgoyne, an 1821 painting by John Trumbull.

Troup was secretary of the Board of War starting in February 1778, and secretary of the Board of Treasury from May 29, 1779 to February 8, 1780.

=== Post-war career ===
Troup completed his study of law under Judge William Paterson, later a Governor of New Jersey. He was in private practice in Albany, New York from 1782 to 1783. From 1784 to 1796, he was in private practice in New York City. He was a member of the New York State Assembly in 1786. He was Clerk of Court for the United States District Court for the District of New York from 1789 to 1796.

Troup was nominated by President George Washington on December 9, 1796, to a seat on the U.S. District Court for the District of New York vacated by Judge John Laurance. He was confirmed by the United States Senate on December 10, 1796, and received his commission the same day. His service terminated on April 4, 1798, due to his resignation.

Following his resignation from the federal bench, Troup resumed private practice in New York City from 1798 to 1804. He was an Agent for Sir William Pulteney's estates in western New York from 1801 to 1832.

Troup served as a trustee of Columbia College from 1811 to 1817, and was a member of the Society of the Cincinnati. Troup was a lifelong personal friend of Alexander Hamilton, with whom he had roomed at King's College and served in the Hearts of Oak militia unit, and he continued to support Hamilton in politics.

== Personal life ==
Troup resided for many years in Geneva, New York, with his wife Jannetje Goelet (1758–1840), a daughter of Peter Goelet and Elizabeth Ratsey. Together, they were the parents of four children:

- Charles Troup, who died unmarried.
- Robert R. Troup (1789–1836), who died unmarried.
- Louisa Troup (1791–1885), who died unmarried.
- Charlotte Troup (1792–1872), who married James Lefferts Brinckerhoff and had two daughters, Charlotte and Maria Louisa.

Troup died on January 14, 1832, in New York City. Troup was originally interred at St. Andrew's Episcopal Church in Manhattan. After the death of his daughter Charlotte in 1872, his body was moved to Green-Wood Cemetery in Brooklyn.

=== Legacy and honors ===
Troup was a co-founder in 1785 of the New York Manumission Society, which promoted the gradual abolition of slavery in New York, and protection of the rights of free black people. Despite being a slaveholder himself, Troup presided at the first meeting of the Society. Together with Hamilton, who joined the Society at its second meeting, Troup led an unsuccessful effort to adopt a rule requiring members of the Society to free any slaves that they themselves owned. In the absence of such a resolution, Troup himself waited to manumit his slaves, freeing four between 1802 and 1814.

The town of Troupsburg, New York was named after Troup. The town of Charlotte, north of the city of Rochester, New York was named by Troup in honor of his daughter.

== Sources ==
- Bielinski, Stefan (2010). Robert Troup. Exhibition of the New York State Museum.

Legal offices
Preceded by John Laurance	Judge of the United States District Court for the District of New York; 1796–1798	Succeeded by John Sloss Hobart
