= Marinus Willett =

American military officer, politician and merchant (1740–1830)

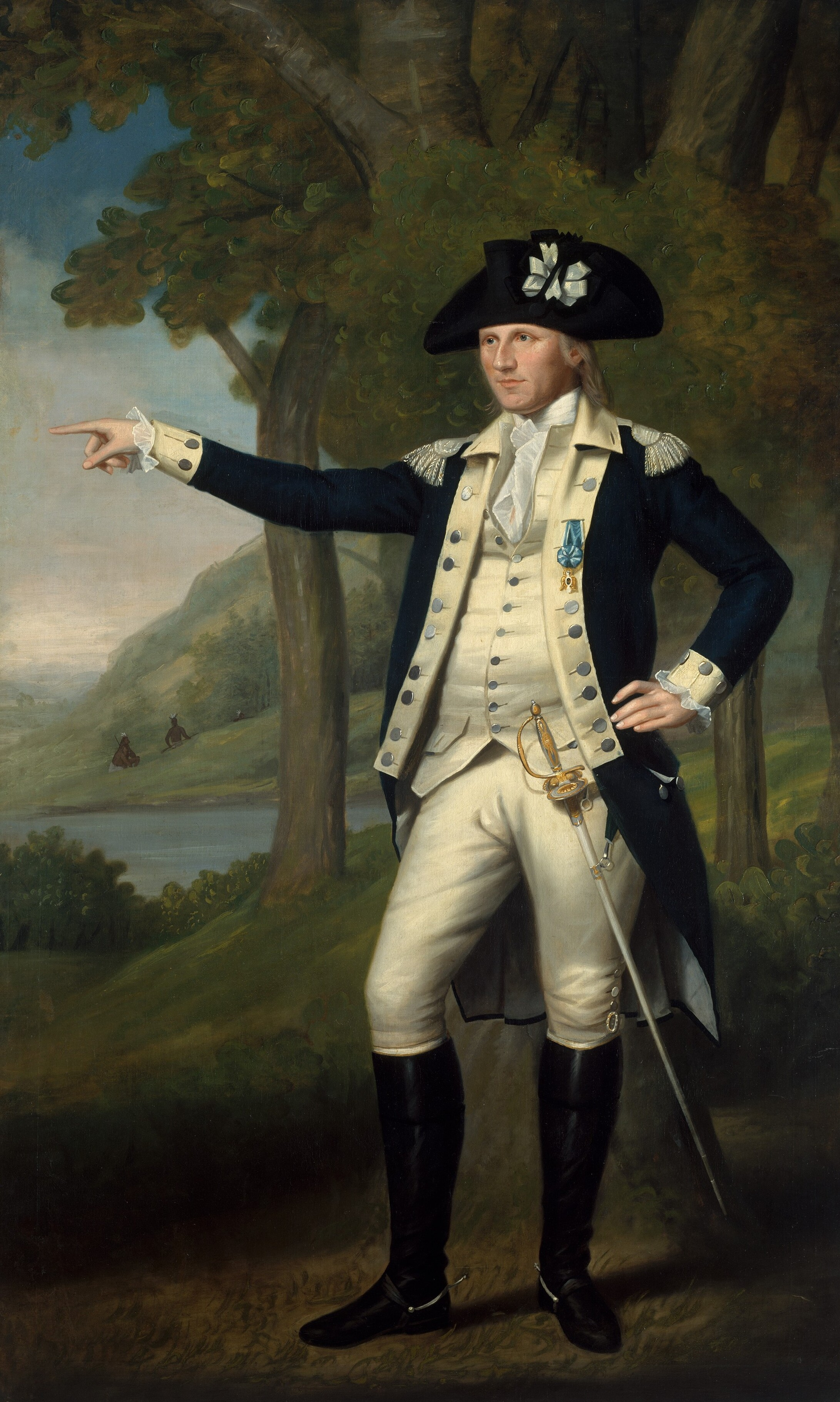
- Portrait by Ralph Earl, c. 1791

49th Mayor of New York City
- In office 1807–1808
- Preceded by: DeWitt Clinton
- Succeeded by: DeWitt Clinton

Personal details
- Born: July 31, 1740 Jamaica, Queens, Province of New York, British America
- Died: August 22, 1830 (aged 90) New York City, New York, U.S.
- Party: Anti-Federalist; Democratic Republican
- Spouse(s): Mary Pearsee (m. 1760); Susannah Vardill (m. 1793); Margaret Bancker (m. 1800)
- Children: 6
- Education: King's College
- Profession: Military officer, politician

Military service
- Allegiance: British America (1754–1763); United States (1776–1783)
- Branch/service: New York Militia (1754–1763); Continental Army (1776–1783)
- Rank: Colonel
- Unit: 1st New York Regiment; 3rd New York Regiment; 5th New York Regiment; Tryon County militia
- Battles/wars: French and Indian War; Ticonderoga campaign; Battle of Fort Frontenac; American Revolutionary War; Invasion of Quebec; Battle of Quebec; Battle of Long Island; Saratoga campaign; Battle of Monmouth; Sullivan Expedition; Battle of Johnstown

Colonel Marinus Willett (July 31, 1740 – August 22, 1830) was an American military officer, politician and merchant who served as the mayor of New York City from 1807 to 1808. Willett is best known for his actions during the American Revolution, where he served as an important Patriot leader in colonial New York before enlisting in the Continental Army and serving in numerous campaigns in the Revolutionary War throughout the Northwest.

Born in Jamaica, Queens, Willett underwent an apprenticeship as a cabinetmaker before enlisting in the New York Militia after the French and Indian War broke out in 1754. He participated in the Ticonderoga campaign and the British capture of Fort Frontenac in 1758, before falling sick and being transferred to Fort Stanwix in order to recuperate. After the end of the conflict in 1763, he entered King's College in New York in 1772 and graduated in 1776.

A prominent member of the Sons of Liberty and leader of the Liberty Boys. Willett enlisted in the 1st New York Regiment in 1775, taking part in the failed invasion of Quebec before transferring to the 3rd New York Regiment in 1776. Fighting at Monmouth, Willett then participated in the 1778 Sullivan Expedition. He was made colonel of the 5th New York Regiment in 1780 and the Tryon County militia in 1781, where he fought at Johnstown before the war's end in 1783.

After the conflict, Willett returned to New York, working as a merchant and aligning himself with the Anti-Federalist Party; he was elected to the New York State Assembly in December 1783. In addition to serving intermittently as New York County Sheriff, Willett also served as New York City's mayor for a year. On August 22, 1830, Willett died and was buried in the graveyard of Trinity Church. The town of Willet, New York, is named in his honor.

== Early life ==
Marinus Willett was born on July 31, 1740, in Jamaica, Queens, New York. Willett's father was Edward Willett, a Quaker tavern keeper in New York, and his mother was Aleta Willett (née Clowes). Growing up, he underwent an apprenticeship as a cabinetmaker. After the French and Indian War broke out in 1754, Willett was commissioned as a lieutenant into the New York Militia, serving in a regiment commanded by Oliver De Lancey.

Serving under De Lancey, Willett participated in the Ticonderoga campaign led by James Abercrombie in July 1758 and John Bradstreet's capture of Fort Frontenac in August 1758. In the same year, he fell sick and was transferred to British-controlled Fort Stanwix in order to recuperate. After the conflict concluded in 1763, Willett returned to New York City, where he eventually entered into King's College in 1772 and graduated in 1776.

As tensions increased between Great Britain and its North American colonies, Willett aligned himself with the Patriot cause and quickly became an informal leader of the New York City branch of the Sons of Liberty. As noted by American historian Larry Lowenthal, his primary activities during this period consisted of inciting colonial public opinion to support the Patriot cause via rabble-rousing tactics and engaging in numerous street fights.

== American Revolutionary War ==
After news of the Battles of Lexington and Concord reached New York City on April 23, 1775, Willett and a group of fellow Patriots broke into the city arsenal and plundered its contents. When British forces stationed in the city attempted to load a convoy of military supplies onto the Asia on June 6, he led a crowd which confiscated the convoy, called the Broad Street Incident. On June 20, Willett was involved in a Patriot raid on a British storehouse in Turtle Bay, Manhattan.

On June 28, 1775, Willett enlisted in the 1st New York Regiment of the Continental Army's New York Line at the rank of captain; the regiment was led by Alexander McDougall. Six weeks later, the regiment took part in Richard Montgomery's failed invasion of British-held Quebec, including the Battle of Quebec on December 31, 1775. After returning to New York City, Willett fought against the British in the Battle of Long Island on August 26, 1776.

Willett enlisted in the 3rd New York Regiment at the rank of lieutenant-colonel in mid-1776 and was stationed in the New York Highlands. Serving at Fort Independence, on March 24, 1777, Willett led a successful counterattack against British forces in what was became known as the Van Cortlandtville Skirmish. Serving as Peter Gansevoort's aide-de-camp, Willett arrived at the now-abandoned Fort Stanwix in late 1777, renovating it and hastily establishing a garrison. On August 6, 1777, Willett led a successful raid on the camps of Barry St. Leger and Sir John Johnson, capturing large quantities of supplies and military intelligence.

In June 1778, as his regiment was stationed at Fort Stanwix, Willett received permission from Gansevoort to join an army commanded by George Washington, participating in the Battle of Monmouth on June 28. Willett then participated in an expedition led by Goose Van Schaick against the Onondaga in April 1778 before returning to his regiment and seeing action in the Sullivan Expedition against British-allied Iroquois in May 1779.

Willett was made colonel of the 5th New York Regiment in early 1780, serving in the regiment until January 1, 1781, when it was disbanded. In April 1781, he was appointed as colonel of the Tryon County militia, with whom Willett secured a victory over a British-Indian force at Johnstown on October 25. After leading an aborted attempted to capture Fort Ontario, Willett's men disbanded themselves in 1783, bringing his military career to an end.

== Political career and death ==
After the conflict's end, Willett returned to New York City and started working as a merchant. He subsequently aligned himself politically with the Anti-Federalist Party, including governor of New York George Clinton, to whom Willett served as a political advisor. Together, the pair frequently discussed plans to counter the political influence of the Democratic-Republican Party, which was dominated by politicians from the American South. In addition to being elected to the New York State Assembly in December 1783, Willett also twice served as the Sheriff of New York County.

In 1790, George Washington, by now serving as the U.S. President, dispatched Willett as a diplomatic envoy to the Muscogee in order to persuade Alexander McGillivray, a prominent Muscogee leader, to come to New York City and negotiate with the federal government. Willett's mission was successful, and a delegation of twenty-seven Muscogee leaders led by McGillivray came to the city and negotiated the 1790 Treaty of New York with Washington and United States Secretary of War Henry Knox. The treaty delineated clear borders between American and Muscogee lands.

Willett continued to advise the federal government on indigenous affairs after the treaty was signed. As noted by historian Colin G. Calloway, when tensions rose between encroaching settlers from Georgia and Muscogee tribals on the American frontier, Willett wrote a letter to Washington warning him against authorising a military offensive against the Muscogee without conducting a thorough investigation on the cause for the tensions. In the letter, Willett claimed that territorial ambitions from the "leading men of Georgia" were to blame for ongoing U.S. tensions with the Muscogee.

In April 1792, Willett was appointed by Washington to command American forces in the ongoing Northwest Indian War at the rank of brigadier-general, though he did not accept the appointment. In a letter to Washington explaining his decision, Willett argued against the United States government's decision to fight the war, claiming that it "would be the last choice of my mind" and that a policy of pursuing peace on the Ohio Country frontier was far more preferable. Willett was subsequently appointed to serve as an emissary to the Northwestern Confederacy, which he also declined.

From 1807 to 1808, Willett served as New York City mayor, having previously joined the Democratic-Republican Party. In 1811, the death of John Broome left a vacancy in the office of New York Lieutenant Governor. Willett participated in a special election as the Tammany Hall candidate, where he was defeated by DeWitt Clinton; this led to Willett retiring from politics. On August 22, 1830, Willett died and was buried in Trinity Church, after a lavish funeral service which included 10,000 mourners. His corpse was later reburied in the New York City Marble Cemetery.

== Personal life, family, and legacy ==
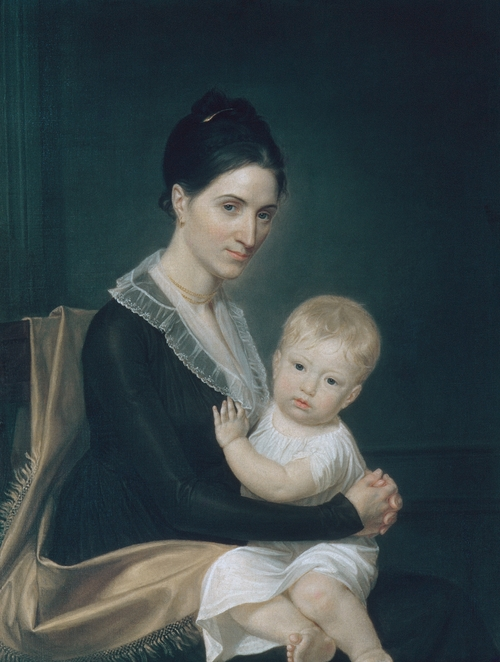
A portrait of Willett's wife and son by John Vanderlyn c. 1802

Throughout his life, Willett was "[very] interested in social services and the needs of [American] citizens", establishing several relief centers, medical centers, and hospitals in New York City "to assist the needy". Having amassed a personal fortune through land speculation and the purchase of confiscated Loyalist estates after the Revolutionary War, Willett invested in these medical institutions and took an active interest in their management until his death in 1830.

Willett was one of the original members of the Society of the Cincinnati, a fraternal hereditary society founded in 1783; the society's membership was restricted to those who had served as military officers in the Continental Army during the American Revolutionary War. In 1791, Willett commissioned American painter Ralph Earl to paint a full-length portrait of him. In c. 1802, he paid for the neoclassicist artist John Vanderlyn to paint his wife Margaret and son Marinus Jr.

Over the course of his life, Willett married thrice. In 1760, he married Mary Pearsee, and had one child together, a son named Marinus, Jr. who died in 1778. After Mary died in 1793, Willett remarried to a widow named Susannah Vardill; the marriage ended in 1799, when she filed for divorce from him. Willett remarried again for a third and final time to Margaret Bancker c. 1800, with whom he had five children: Marinus Jr., William, Edward, Elbert, and Margaret.

Numerous locations were named after Willett both during and after his life. A street in Albany, New York, bordering Washington Park, was named in honor of Willett, as was Willet, a town in Cortland County, New York. A memorial plaque commemorating Willett was fixed to a boulder in the Albany park in 1907. The boulder was struck numerous times in traffic collisions, so it was moved to a different location in 2006 in anticipation of the park's 200th anniversary.

Legal offices
Preceded by DeWitt Clinton	Mayor of New York City; 1807 – 1808	Succeeded by DeWitt Clinton
