= HMS Pembroke (1757) =

British ship of the line

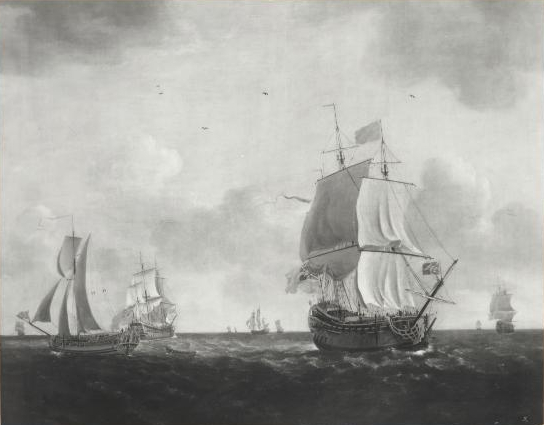
- HMS Pembroke hove-to for the dispatch of a yacht (Note: Photo of a painting by Richard Paton. Courtesy Paul Mellon Centre Photographic Archive)

History

Great Britain
- Name: Pembroke
- Ordered: 8 November 1752
- Builder: Plymouth Dockyard
- Launched: 2 June 1757
- Fate: Broken up, 1793

General characteristics
- Class & type: 1752 amendments 60-gun fourth rate ship of the line
- Tons burthen: 1222
- Length: 156 ft (47.5 m) (gundeck)
- Beam: 42 ft (12.8 m)
- Depth of hold: 18 ft (5.5 m)
- Propulsion: Sails
- Sail plan: Full-rigged ship
- Armament: 60 guns: Gundeck: 24 × 24 pdrs; Upper gundeck: 26 × 12 pdrs; Quarterdeck: 8 × 6 pdrs; Forecastle: 2 × 6 pdrs

HMS Pembroke was a 60-gun fourth rate ship of the line of the Royal Navy, designed by Sir Joseph Allin and built by Thomas Bucknall at Plymouth Dockyard to the draught specified in the 1745 Establishment as amended in 1752, and launched on 2 June 1757.

It was converted to serve as a hulk in 1776, and was eventually broken up in 1793.

== Crew ==
For her first two years Pembroke was captained by John Simcoe, the father of John Graves Simcoe who became the first Lieutenant Governor of Upper Canada. When the elder Simcoe died in 1759 he was replaced by John Wheelock who served as captain for the remaining seventeen years of Pembroke's active service. Thomas Bisset served as ships master during her commissioning, then responsibility passed to James Cook, who would later become the first European to reach the eastern Australian coastline. Cook served as master until 1759 with duties then devolving to John Cleader.

== Service ==
Pembroke saw service in the North American theatre of the Seven Years' War, including the Siege of Louisbourg under Captain Simcoe, and the Capture of Québec under Captain Wheelock, both with James Cook as master. In advance of the latter battle, the ship played an important role charting the approaches to Québec up the St. Lawrence River, so that the main fleet could follow.

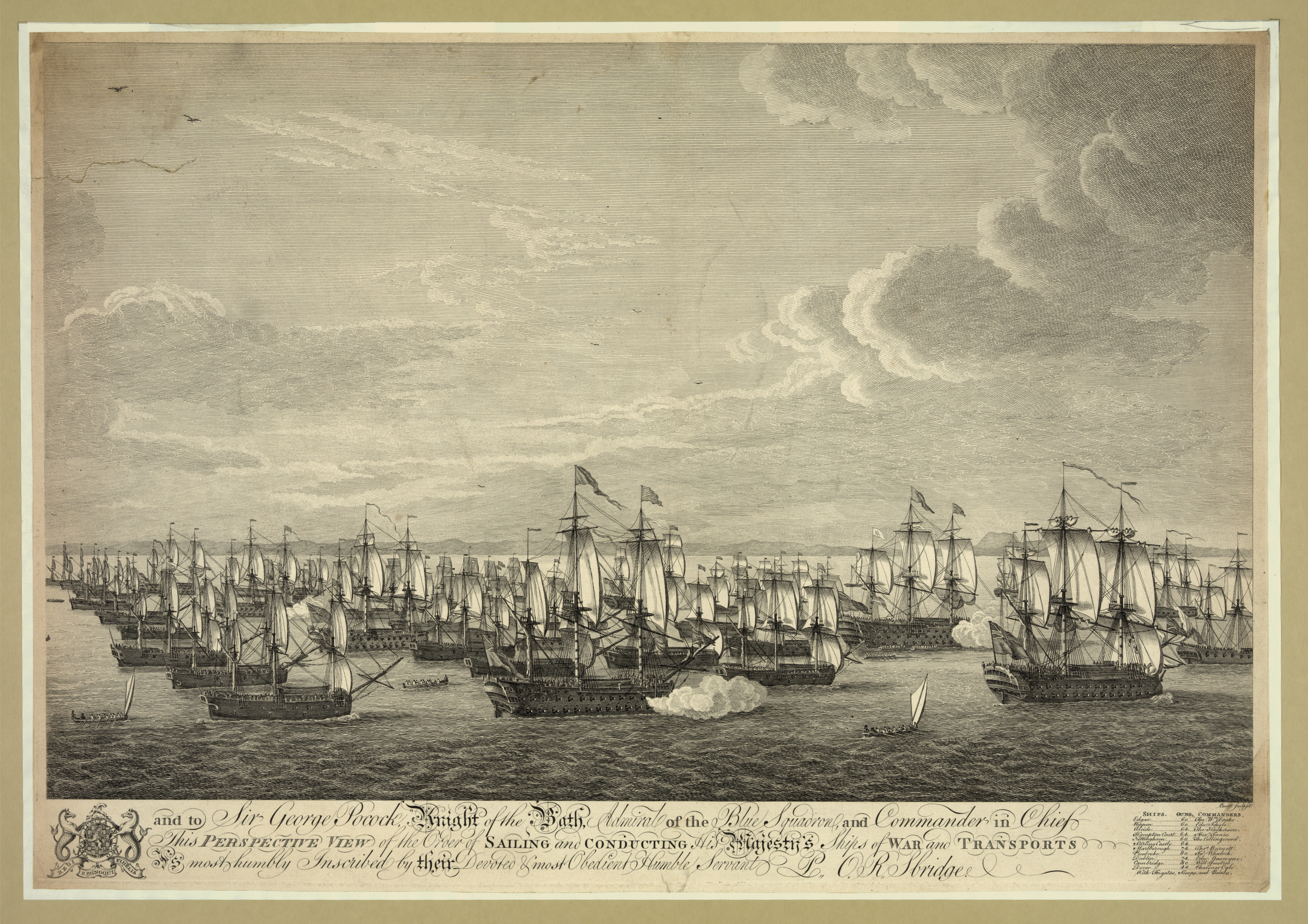
Shown here as a member Sir George Pocock's Blue Squadron, circa 1762
