= 1811 New York lieutenant gubernatorial special election =

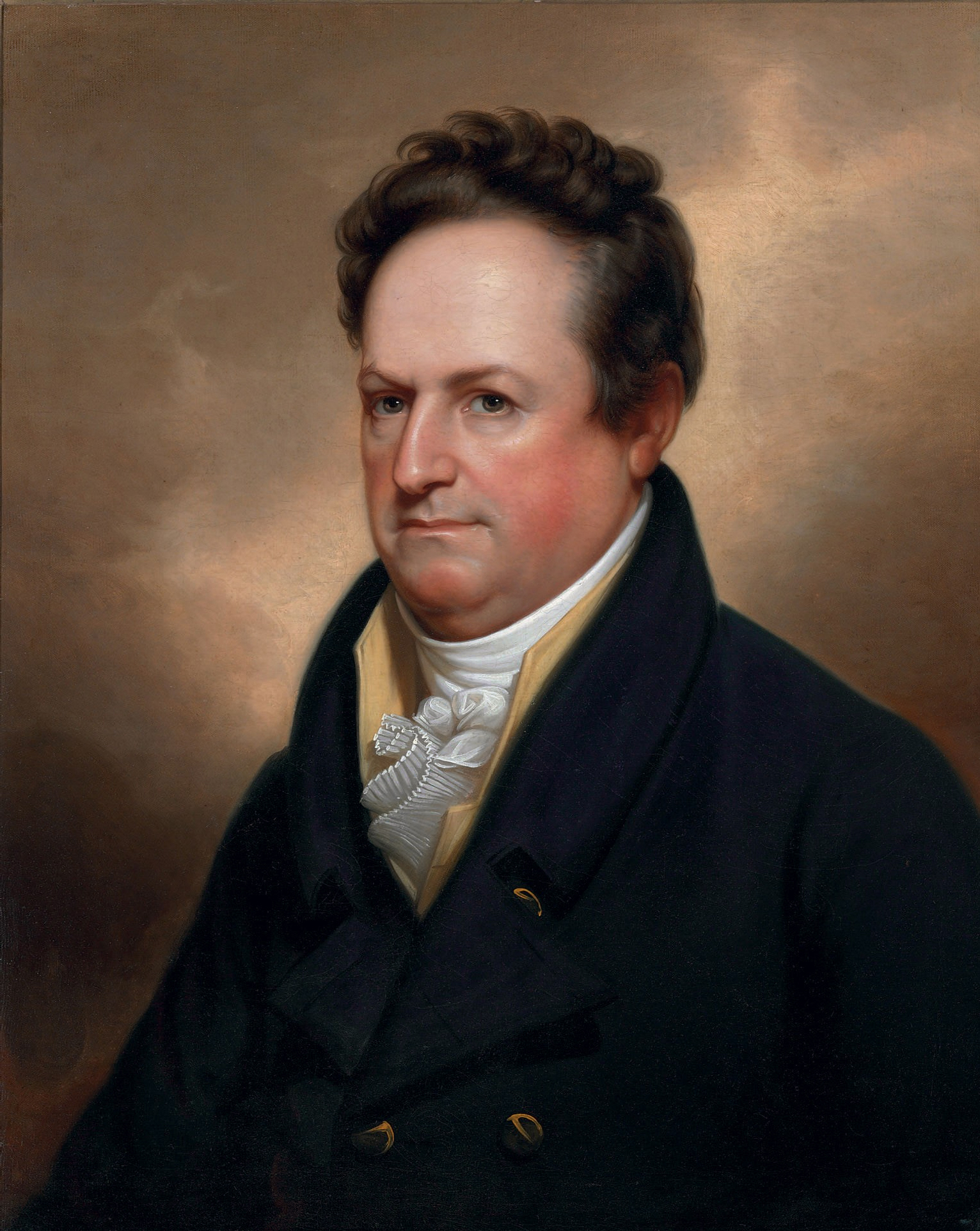

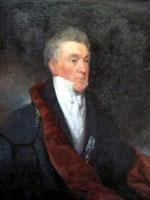
Nominee	DeWitt Clinton	Nicholas Fish
Party	Democratic-Republican	Federalist
Popular vote	32,754	29,027
Percentage	50.39%	44.65%
Lieutenant Governor before election
John Tayler
Democratic-Republican
Elected Lieutenant Governor
DeWitt Clinton
Democratic-Republican

The 1811 New York lieutenant gubernatorial special election was held to fill the unexpired term of the Lieutenant Governor of New York.

== Background ==
Lieutenant Governor John Broome died in August 1810, and the 1777 Constitution provided for new elections if a vacancy occurred either in the Governor's or the Lieutenant Governor's office.

== Candidates ==
The Democratic-Republican Party nominated Mayor of New York City DeWitt Clinton.

The Federalist Party nominated former Adjutant General of New York Nicholas Fish.

Tammany Hall nominated former Mayor of New York City Marinus Willett.

== Results ==
1811 New York lieutenant gubernatorial election
Party	Candidate	Votes	%
Democratic-Republican	DeWitt Clinton	32,754	50.39%
Federalist	Nicholas Fish	29,027	44.65%
Tammany	Marinus Willett	3,226	4.96%
Total votes		65,007	100%

== See also ==
- New York gubernatorial elections

== Sources ==
Result
