= Combined Arms Research Library =

Coordinates: 39°20′48″N 94°54′58″W

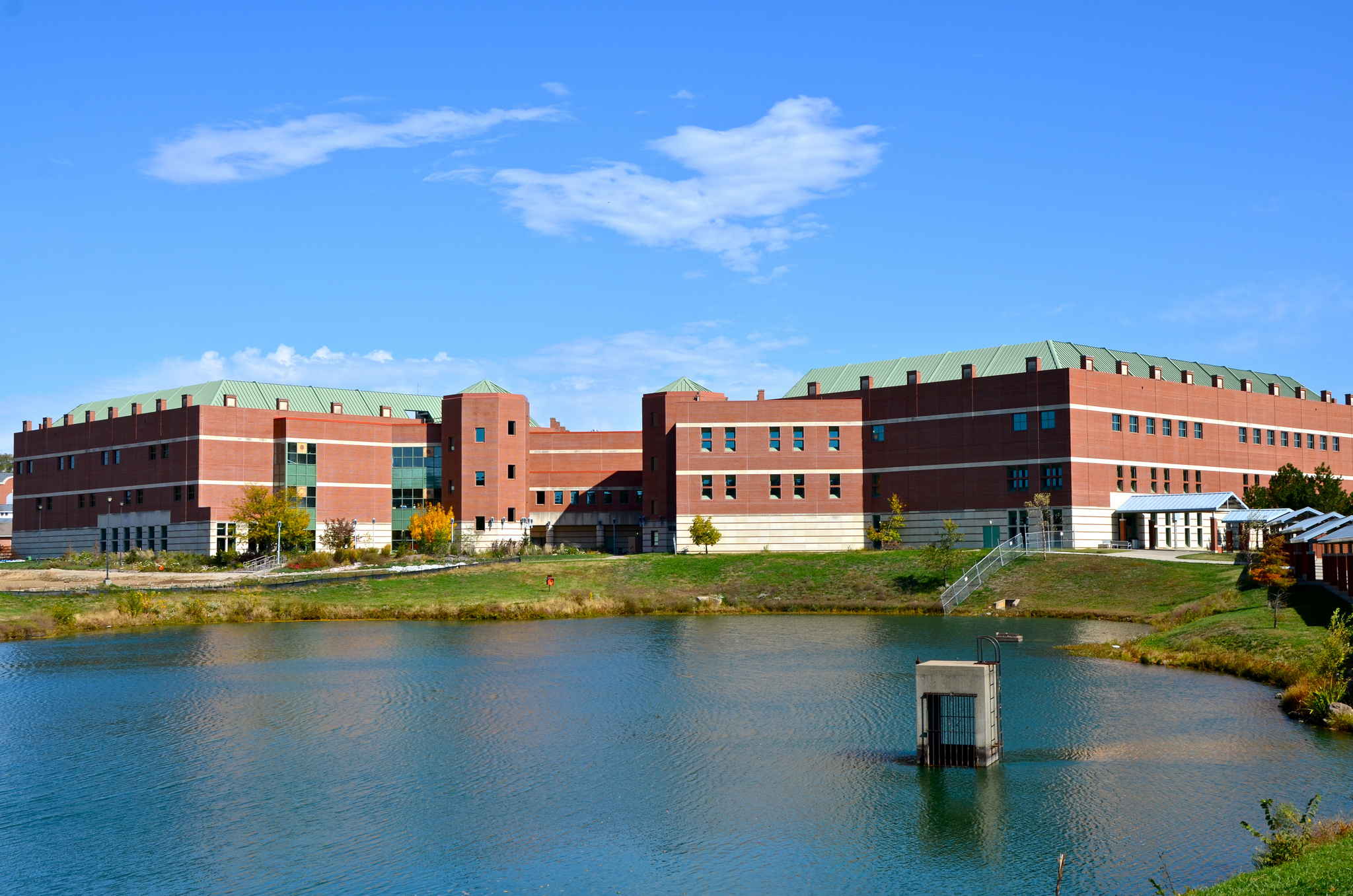
- Eisenhower Hall
- Active: 1881-Present
- Country: USA
- Allegiance: Federal
- Garrison/HQ: Fort Leavenworth, Kansas

The Combined Arms Research Library (CARL) at Fort Leavenworth, Kansas is a United States Army library that supports the United States Army Command and General Staff College. Its collection of over 300,000 books covers all aspects of military science: joint and combined operations; tactics and doctrinal development; leadership, intelligence, weapons, equipment, and training. The Archives and Special Collections house a unique collection of over 200,000 items and the documents collection consists of another 250,000. Each year, the CARL reference staff answers some 30,000 queries for soldiers, faculty and staff at Fort Leavenworth, Kansas and throughout the world via the Defense Digital Library Reference Service. Scholars, writers and the DoD community use the Combined Arms Research Library's archival materials, extensive research materials, and historical documents. The Combined Arms Research Library is one of the largest and most well respected libraries in the Army and was named the 2007 Federal Library of the Year by the Federal Library and Information Center Committee (FLICC).

== Mission statement ==
- CARL advances the educational mission of the CGSC by providing scholarly resources and expertise in academic research support.
- Provide assistance to Fort Leavenworth and other DOD offices and installations in their search for useful information resources.
- CARL provides educational and recreational resources and offers programs that enhance the lives of the Fort Leavenworth community.

== Photo gallery ==
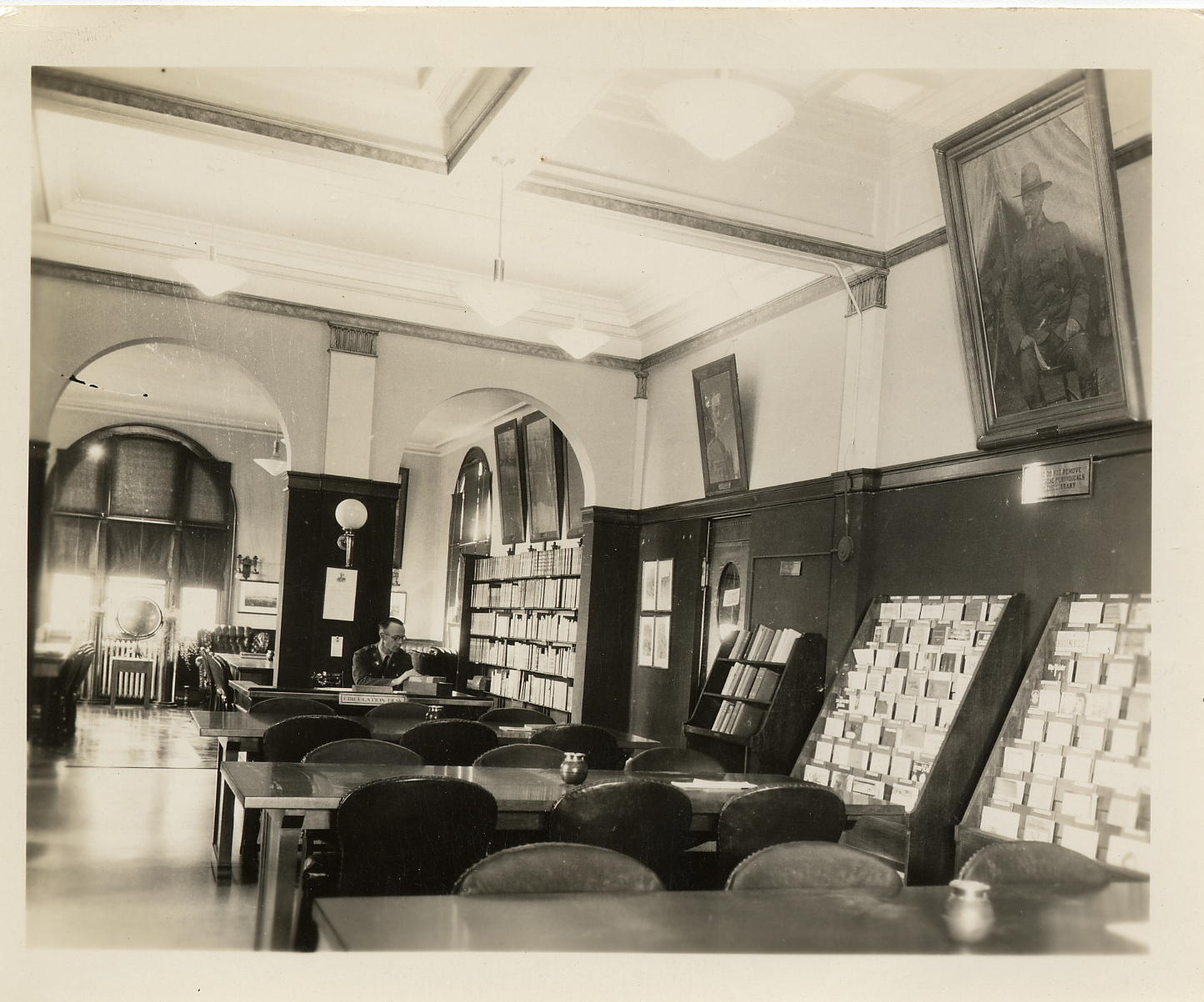
Photo inside library at Fort Leavenworth in the early 20th century.

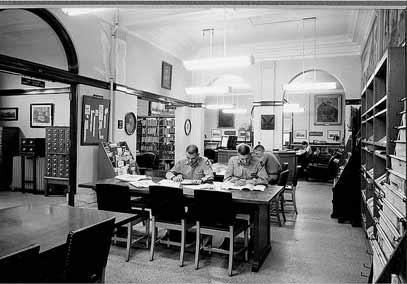
Students reading in the Command and General Staff College Library, Located in Wagner Hall, Fort Leavenworth, KS during the 1940s

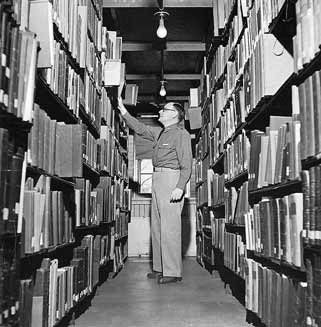
Student browsing the stacks in the Command and General Staff College Library located in Wagner Hall at Fort Leavenworth, KS - 1941

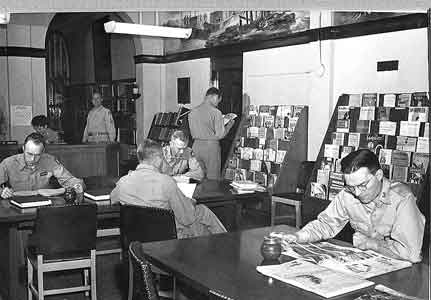
Students reading in the Command and General Staff Library located in Wagner Hall, Fort Leavenworth, KS during the 1950s
