= New York Provincial Company of Artillery =

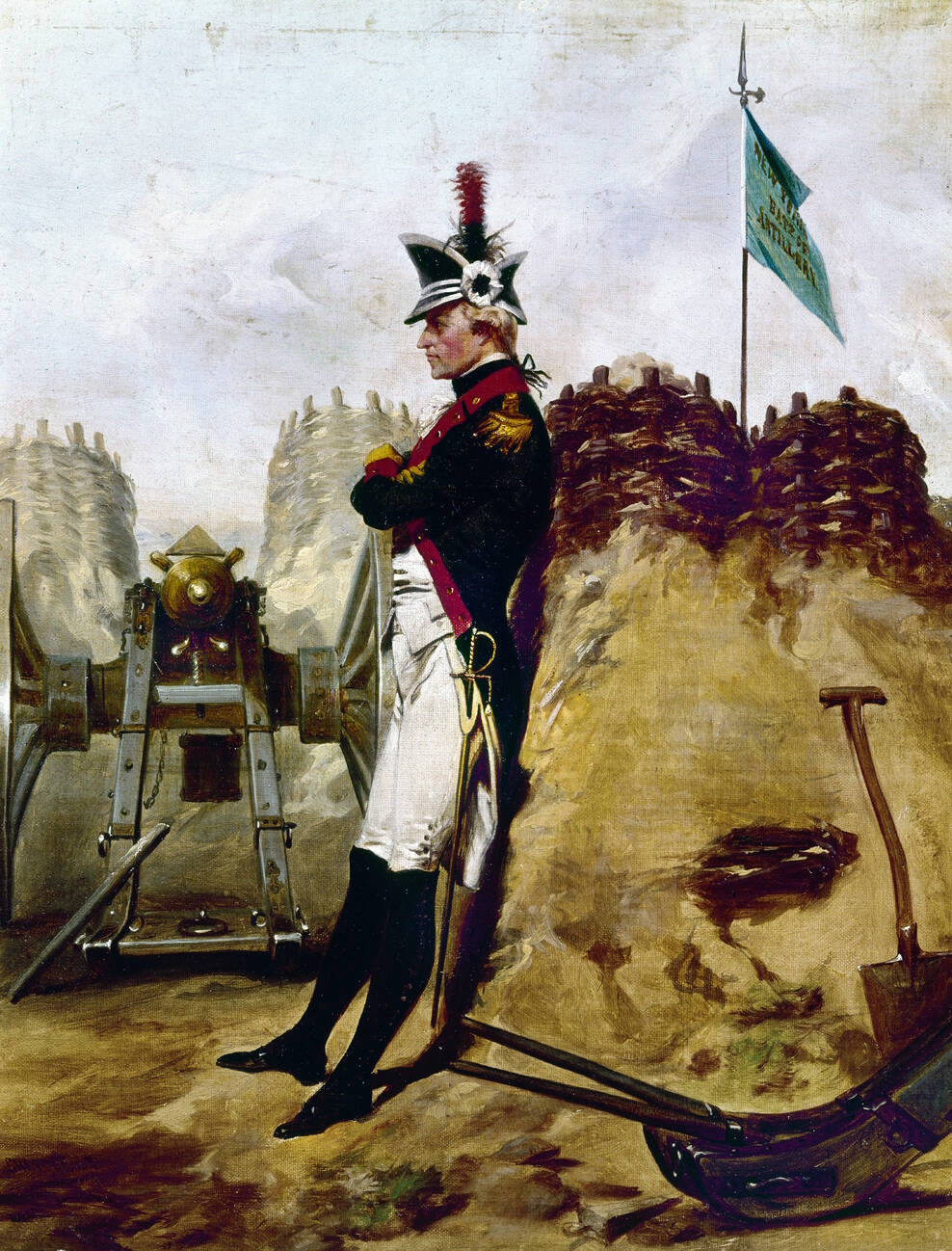
- Alexander Hamilton in the Uniform of the New York Artillery, by Alonzo Chappel
- Active: 1776
- Allegiance: New York; United States
- Type: Milita
- Role: Coastal artillery, Field artillery
- Part of: New York Militia
- Engagements: Landing at Kip's Bay; Battle of Harlem Heights; Battle of White Plains; Battle of Trenton; Battle of the Assunpink Creek; Battle of Princeton

Commanders
- Notable commanders: Alexander Hamilton

During the American Revolutionary War, the New York Provincial Company of Artillery was created by the New York Provincial Congress in 1776 to defend New York City from British attack.

== History ==
=== Revolution ===
The revolutionary government of the province commissioned Alexander Hamilton, then a student at King's College (now, Columbia University) and an officer in a militia unit of artillery called the Hearts of Oak, to create the new Provincial Company of Artillery. The new Company saw action in the Battle of White Plains and the Battle of Trenton, among others. It was while commanding this unit with distinction that Hamilton came to the attention of many high-ranking officers in the Continental Army, a number of them offering him positions on their staffs. Hamilton refused them all to become de facto Chief of Staff to the commander-in-chief, General George Washington, for much of the remainder of the war.

The New York Provincial Company of Artillery is considered the ancestor of the 1st Battalion, 5th Field Artillery Regiment, making it the oldest active unit in the U.S. Regular Army and the only one with credit for the Revolutionary War. It is also one of the few with credit for the War of 1812.

=== Post Revolution ===
In November 1783, the Continental Army was reduced to one regiment. In June 1784, Congress decided to have only one artillery company on active duty. The company commanded by Captain John Doughty, which was the direct descendant of New York Provincial Company, was the one selected. The company was assigned to guard stores of arms and equipment at West Point, New York and Fort Pitt in Pennsylvania.

In August 1784, the Army expanded to one regiment, under the command of Colonel Josiah Harmar and one artillery battalion, to which Captain Doughty's company was assigned. Along with the regiment, the company participated in the campaigns against the Miami tribe in the Northwest Territories (modern day Ohio), in 1790 and 1791.

The company served in the War of 1812 in Louisiana, where in January 1815, under the command of Captain Charles Wollstonecraft, defended Fort St. Philip against the British Navy after the British Army had been defeated at the Battle of New Orleans earlier that month.

In the Army's reorganization of 1821, the company was designated as Company F of the 4th United States Artillery. It retained this designation until 1901.

During the 19th Century, the company served in the Mexican War, American Civil War, and in campaigns against Native Americans, including Little Big Horn and Pine Ridge.

=== 20th century ===
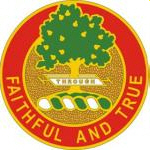
Distinctive unit insignia of the United States Army 1st Battalion, 5th Field Artillery Regiment (i.e. Alexander Hamilton Battery). The crest at center is that of Clan Hamilton, with the addition of 13 gold acorns representing the original 13 states.

In 1907, the company was re-designated as Battery D of the 5th Field Artillery Regiment.

Following the entry of the United States into the First World War, in 1917, the 5th Field Artillery was assigned to the 1st Division (later re-designated as the 1st Infantry Division). The 5th Field Artillery has been a subordinate unit of the 1st Infantry Division for most of its history, from 1917 to the present.

The company deployed with the division to France in 1917 and served in France for the remainder of the war. It participated in the Lorraine, St. Mihiel and Meuse-Argonne offensives in 1918.

In World War II the 5th Field Artillery Regiment was reorganized as the 5th Field Artillery Battalion and assigned to the 1st Infantry Division in 1940. The company has been a subordinate unit of the 1st Infantry Division ever since.

During the war, the company, along with the division, participated in the invasion of North Africa in 1942, the invasion of Sicily in 1943, the invasion of Normandy in 1944 and was in Germany with than country surrendered on 8 May 1945. The company participated in a total of 8 campaigns during the war.

The company later served in Korea, Vietnam, Operation Desert Storm and Operation Iraqi Freedom as an element of the 1st Infantry Division.

1st Battalion, 5th Artillery was commanded by Lieutenant Colonel Charles Calvin Rogers when he earned the Medal of Honor in 1968. Rogers retired from the Army in 1984 as a major general. He is the highest ranking African-American to receive the Medal of Honor.

== Lineage and honors ==
(The following information is sourced from the website of the United States Army Center of Military History and is in the public domain.)

=== Pre-War of 1812 ===
Constituted 6 January 1776 by the colony of New York as the New York Provincial Company of Artillery, commanded by Captain Alexander Hamilton.

Organized 3 February-30 March 1776 at New York, New York.

Transferred 17 March 1777 to the Continental Army as Captain John Doughty's Company, Colonel John Lamb's (New York) Continental Artillery Regiment.

Redesignated 10 August 1779 as the 2nd Company, 2nd Continental Artillery Regiment.

Reorganized and redesigned 1, January 1784 as Captain John Doughty's Company of Artillery.

Reorganized and redesignated in July 1785 as the 1st Company (commanded by Major John Doughty), Artillery, First American Regiment.

Reorganized 20 October, 1786 as the 1st Company (commanded by Captain James Bradford), Artillery, First American Regiment

Reorganized and redesignated 3 October 1787 as the 1st Company (commanded by Captain James Bradford), Battalion of Artillery.

Consolidated in 1792 with the 2nd Company, Battalion of Artillery (see ANNEX 1), and consolidated unit reorganized and redesignated as Captain Mahlon Ford's Company of Artillery of the 1st Sublegion, Legion of the United States. Redesignated 9 May 1794 as Captain Mahlon Ford's Company, 1st Battalion, Corps of Artillerists and Engineers.

Redesignated 27 April 1798 as Captain Mahlon Ford's Company, 4th Battalion, 1st Regiment of Artillerists and Engineers

Consolidated in 1800 with Captain James Sterrett's Company, 1st Regiment of Artillerists and Engineers (see ANNEX 2), and consolidated unit designated as Captain James Sterrett's Company, 1st Regiment of Artillerists and Engineers.

Redesignated in March 1801 as Captain John W. Livingston's Company, 2nd Regiment of Artillerists and Engineers

Redesignated 1 April 1802 as Captain John W. Livingston's Company, Regiment of Artillerists.

Redesignated in May 1802 as Captain James Sterrett's Company, Regiment of Artillerists.

Redesignated in 1806 as Captain Charles Wollstonecraft's Company, Regiment of Artillerists.

=== War of 1812 ===
Redesignated 11 January 1812 as Captain Charles Wollstonecraft's Company, 1st Regiment of Artillery.

Redesignated 12 May 1814 as Captain Charles Wollstonecraft's Company, Corps of Artillery.

Consolidated 17 May 1815 with Captain Francis Newman's Company, Corps of Artillery (see ANNEX 3), and consolidated unit designated as Captain Charles Wollstonecraft's Company, Corps of Artillery, Southern Division.

Redesignated in late 1815 as Captain George P. Peters' Company, Corps of Artillery, Southern Division.

Redesignated 21 August 1816 as Company A, 3nd Battalion, Corps of Artillery, Southern Division.

Redesignated 1 June 1821 as Company F, 4th Regiment of Artillery.

=== Early 20th Century ===
Reorganized and redesignated 13 February 1901 as the 8th Battery, Field Artillery, Artillery Corps.

Reorganized and redesignated 31 May 1907 as Battery D, 5th Field Artillery Regiment (5th Field Artillery assigned 8 June 1917 to the 1st Expeditionary Division (later redesignated as the 1st Division).

Relieved in March 1921 from assignment to the 1st Division.

Assigned 1 January 1930 to the 1st Division (later redesignated as the 1st Infantry Division).

Inactivated 1 October 1933 at Fort Bragg, North Carolina.

Re-activated 1 May 1939 at Madison Barracks, New York.

=== World War II ===
Reorganized and redesignated 1 October 1940 as Battery D, 5th Field Artillery Battalion. Assigned to the 1st Infantry Division.

=== Post World War II ===
Reorganized and redesignated 15 February 1957 as Headquarters and Headquarters Battery, 1st Field Artillery Battalion, 5th Artillery, an element of the 1st Infantry Division (organic elements constituted 8 February 1957 and activated 15 February 1957).

Reorganized and redesignated 20 April 1960 as the 1st Rocket Howitzer Battalion, 5th Artillery.

(Headquarters and Headquarters Battery, 1st Rocket Howitzer Battalion, 5th Artillery, consolidated 26 August 1960 with Battery D, 5th Coast Artillery [organized in 1861], and consolidated unit designated as Headquarters and Headquarters Battery, 1st Rocket Howitzer Battalion, 5th Artillery).

Redesignated 20 January 1964 as the 1st Battalion, 5th Artillery.

Reorganized and redesignated (less former Battery D, 5th Coast Artillery) 1 September 1971 as the 1st Battalion, 5th Field Artillery (former Battery D, 5th Coast Artillery, concurrently redesignated as the 1st Battalion, 5th Air Defense Artillery--hereafter separate lineage).

Redesignated 1 October 2005 as the 1st Battalion, 5th Field Artillery Regiment.

=== ANNEX 1 ===
Constituted 3 June 1784 in the Regular Army as the 2nd Company, Artillery, First American Regiment.

Organized August-September 1784 in Pennsylvania as the 2nd Company (commanded by Captain Thomas Douglass), Artillery, First American Regiment.

Redesignated 20 October 1785 as the 2nd Company (commanded by Captain William Ferguson), Artillery, First American Regiment.

Redesignated 3 October 1787 as the 2nd Company (commanded by Captain William Ferguson), Battalion of Artillery.

Redesignated 4 March 1791 as the 2nd Company (commanded by Captain Mahlon Ford), Battalion of Artillery.

=== ANNEX 2 ===
Constituted 20, October 1786 in the Regular Army as a company of artillery.

Organized in 1786 in Massachusetts as Captain Joseph Savage's Company of Artillery.

Redesignated 3, October 1787 as the 4th Company (commanded by Captain Joseph Savage), Battalion of Artillery.

Reorganized and redesignated in 1792 as Captain John Pierce's Company of Artillery of the 2nd Sublegion, Legion of the United States.

Redesignated 9, May 1794 as Captain John Pierce's Company, 1st Battalion, Corps of Artillerists and Engineers.

Redesignated in 1796 as Captain George Demler's Company, 1st Battalion, Corps of Artillerists and Engineers.

Redesignated 27, April 1798 as Captain George Demler's Company, 1st Regiment of Artillerists and Engineers.

Redesignated 19, March 1799 as Captain James Sterrett's Company, 1st Regiment of Artillerists and Engineers.

=== ANNEX 3 ===
Constituted 27, April 1798 in the Regular Army as a company in the 2nd Regiment of Artillerists and Engineers.

Organized in late 1798 at Fort Wolcott, Rhode Island, as Captain Amos Stoddard's Company, 2nd Regiment of Artillerists and Engineers.

Redesignated 1, April 1802 as Captain Amos Stoddard's Company, Regiment of Artillerists.

Redesignated in 1810 as Captain Francis Newman's Company, Regiment of Artillerists.

Redesignated 11, January 1812 as Captain Francis Newman's Company, 1st Regiment of Artillery.

Redesignated 12, May 1814 as Captain Francis Newman's Company, Corps of Artillery.

=== 1st Battalion, 5th Field Artillery Regiment Honors ===
==== Campaign participation credit ====
Revolutionary War: *Long Island; *Trenton; *Princeton; *Brandywine; *Germantown; *Monmouth; *Yorktown; *New Jersey 1776; *New Jersey 1777; *New Jersey 1780; *New York 1776

War of 1812: *Louisiana 1814; *Louisiana 1815

Indian Wars: *Miami; *Creeks; *Seminoles; *Little Big Horn; *Pine Ridge

Mexican War: *Vera Cruz; *Cerro Gordo; *Contreras; *Chapultepec

Civil War: *Valley; *Manassas; *Antietam; *Chancellorsville; *Gettysburg; *Virginia 1861

War with Spain: *Santiago

Philippine Insurrection: *Cavite; *Luzon 1899; *Samar 1900; *Samar 1901

World War I: *Montdidier-Noyon; *Aisne-Marne; *St. Mihiel; *Meuse-Argonne; *Lorraine 1917; *Lorraine 1918; *Picardy 1918

World War II: *Algeria-French Morocco; *Tunisia; *Sicily (with arrowhead); *Normandy (with arrowhead); *Northern France; *Rhineland; *Ardennes-Alsace; *Central Europe

Vietnam: *Defense; *Counteroffensive; *Counteroffensive, Phase II; *Counteroffensive, Phase III; *Tet Counteroffensive; *Counteroffensive, Phase IV; *Counteroffensive, Phase V; *Counteroffensive, Phase VI; *Tet 69/Counteroffensive; *Summer-Fall 1969; *Winter-Spring 1970

Southwest Asia: *Defense of Saudi Arabia; *Liberation and Defense of Kuwait; *Cease-Fire

War on Terrorism: Campaigns to be determined

==== Decorations ====
- Valorous Unit Award, Streamer embroidered AL ANBAR PROVINCE
- Meritorious Unit Commendation (Army), Streamer embroidered VIETNAM 1966-1967
- Meritorious Unit Commendation (Army), Streamer embroidered VIETNAM 1967-1968
- French Croix de Guerre with Palm, World War I, Streamer embroidered LORRAINE-PICARDY
- French Croix de Guerre with Palm, World War I, Streamer embroidered AISNE-MARNE and MEUSE-ARGONNE
- French Croix de Guerre with Palm, World War II, Streamer embroidered KASSERINE
- French Croix de Guerre with Palm, World War II, Streamer embroidered NORMANDY
- French Médaille militaire, Fourragere
- Belgian Fourragere 1940
- Cited in the Order of the Day of the Belgian Army for action at Mons
- Cited in the Order of the Day of the Belgian Army for action at Eupen-Malmedy
- Republic of Vietnam Cross of Gallantry with Palm, Streamer embroidered VIETNAM 1965-1968
- Republic of Vietnam Cross of Gallantry with Palm, Streamer embroidered VIETNAM 1969-1970
- Republic of Vietnam Civil Action Honor Medal, First Class, Streamer embroidered VIETNAM 1965-1970

Battery D additionally entitled to:

Meritorious Unit Commendation (Army), Streamer embroidered IRAQ OCT 2006 - AUG 2007
