= 5th Field Artillery Regiment =

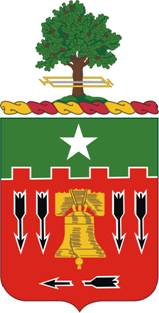
- Coat of arms
- Active: 1776 - Present (Regular Army)
- Country: United States
- Branch: United States Army
- Type: Field artillery
- Mottos: "Faithful and True"

Insignia
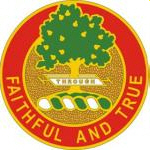
- Distinctive unit insignia

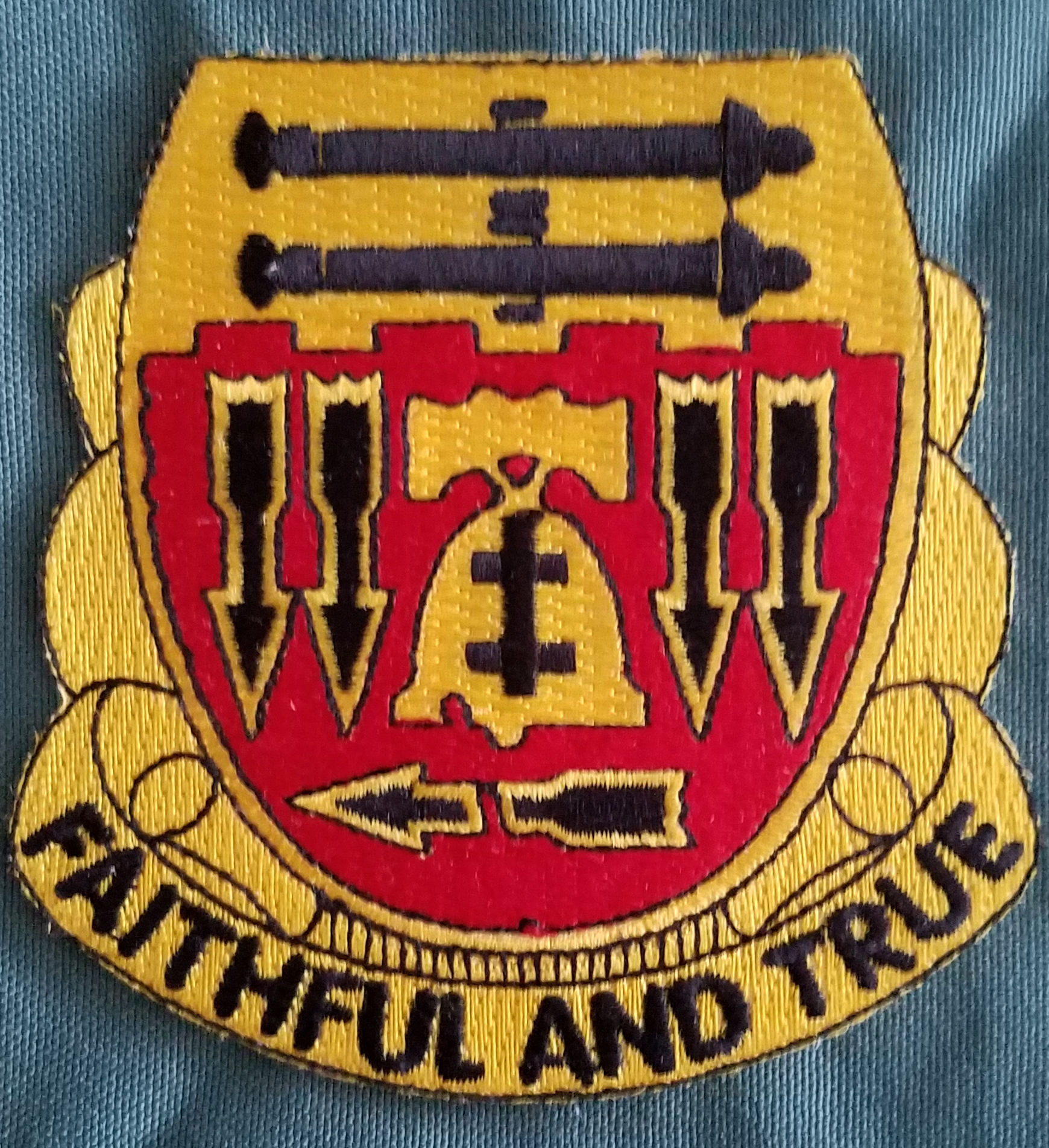
- Former Distinctive unit insignia

The 5th Field Artillery Regiment was constituted as part of the Regular Army in January 1907. Individual battalions have lineages which date back further. Currently, it is a parent regiment under the U.S. Army Regimental System, with a single active battalion, the 1st Battalion, 5th Field Artillery, which is assigned to the 1st Division Artillery, 1st Infantry Division at Fort Riley, Kansas.

== Distinctive unit insignia ==
The distinctive unit insignia consists of a device of gold-colored metal and enamel, 1 inch (2.5 cm) in diameter, depicting an adaptation of the crest and motto of the coat of arms. The crest is that of the Hamilton family, since Alexander Hamilton was a founding commander of one of the elements of the regiment.

The distinctive unit insignia was originally approved for the 5th Field Artillery Regiment on 21 January 1924. It was redesignated for the 5th Field Artillery Battalion on 13 September 1944. The insignia was cancelled on 19 April 1960. It was reinstated and authorized for the 5th Field Artillery Regiment effective 1 September 1971.

== Coat of arms ==
Blazon

Shield
Gules the liberty bell Or between five arrows four point down in fess paleways and one in base fessways, the latter broken Sable fimbriated Argent. On a chief embattled Vert fimbriated Argent a five-pointed mullet of the last (for the 12th Corps, Civil War).
Crest
On a wreath of the colors Or and Gules, on a mount an oak tree fructed of 13 acorns and penetrated transversely in the main stem by a frame saw Proper, the frame Or (For Alexander Hamilton).
Motto
FAITHFUL AND TRUE.

Symbolism

Shield
The shield is scarlet for Artillery. The Liberty Bell alludes to the Revolutionary War. The five arrows commemorate the Indian War campaign credit of old Company "F", 4th Artillery. The broken arrow is indicative of the engagement at the Battle of the Wabash, Ohio Territory, 4 November 1791, in which all officers and two-thirds of the men of Bradford’s Company, Battalion of Artillery, were killed. The embattled partition line refers to the ramparts of Chapultapec and denotes service during the Mexican War. The star, the insignia of the 12th Corps in which batteries of the regiment served, is representative of the Civil War.
Crest
The crest is the same used in the unit's distinctive unit insignia.

== 1st Battalion ==
1st Battalion, 5th Field Artillery traces its lineage to 6 January 1776, and is the oldest Regular Army unit on uninterrupted active duty. It is the only active Regular Army unit with credit for Revolutionary War service, and one of the few with credit for War of 1812 service.

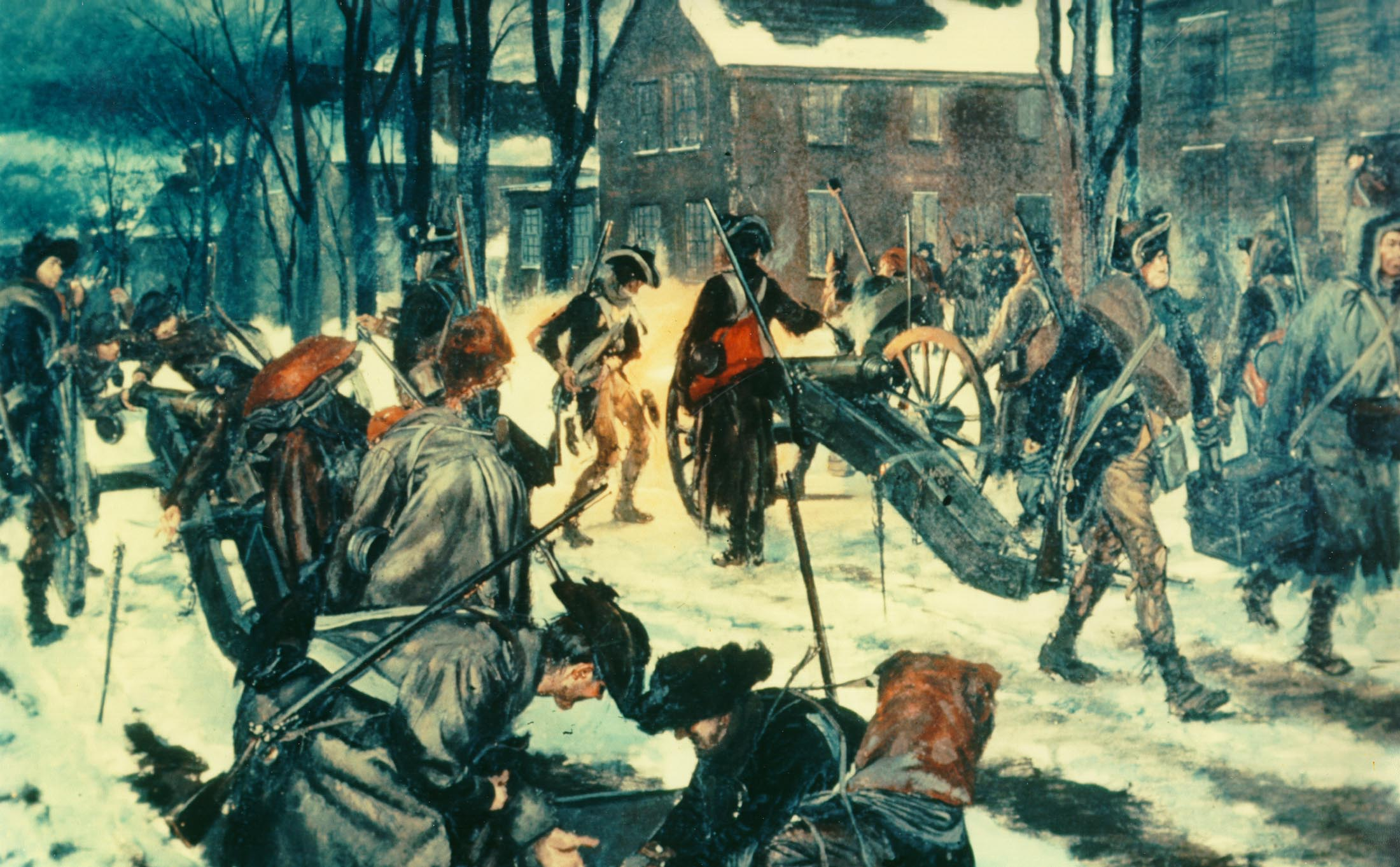
Trenton, New Jersey, 26 December 1776. General Washington here matched surprise and endurance against the superior numbers and training of the British, and the Continental Army won its first victory in long months of painful striving. Trenton eliminated 1,000 Hessians and drove the British from their salient in New Jersey. It saved the flagging American cause and put new heart into Washington's men. Alexander Hamilton's Company of New York Artillery (now 1st Battalion, 5th Field Artillery) opened the fight at dawn, blasting the bewildered Hessians as they tried to form ranks in the streets.

The New York Provincial Company of Artillery was led first in the American Revolutionary War by Captain Alexander Hamilton, who would later become one of the Founding Fathers of the United States. During the Revolution, the company fought at Long Island, Trenton, Princeton, Brandywine, Germantown, Monmouth, Yorktown, and New York.

After participating in the final victory at Yorktown, the unit was selected, in 1784, as the only Continental Army unit to remain on active duty status. Later the unit fought in the War of 1812, as well as in the Miami, Creek, Seminole, Little Big Horn and Pine Ridge Indian campaigns. In 1821 the company was designated as Company F, 4th Regiment of Artillery. The unit went on to participate in multiple campaigns in the Mexican War of 1846–1848.

Remaining loyal to the Union in the American Civil War, "Hamilton's Own" fought valiantly in the Valley, Manassas, Antietam, Chancellorsville, Gettysburg, and Virginia 1861 Campaigns.

After earning a campaign streamer at Santiago in the Spanish–American War, the ancestor of the 1st Battalion, 5th Field Artillery went to the Philippines and participated in the campaigns at Cavite, Luzon 1899, Samar 1900, and Samar 1901.

In 1901, the unit was redesignated as the 8th Battery, Field Artillery, Artillery Corps; in 1907 the 5th Field Artillery was organized, with "Hamilton's Own" becoming Battery D.

An officer of the battalion, First Lieutenant (later Brigadier General) Gruber composed the Caisson Song. The song that was the 1st Battalion, 5th Field Artillery's regimental march later became the Artillery and then the Army Song.

The battalion was assigned to the 1st Infantry Division and was among the first U.S. units sent to France in 1917 during World War I. The unit deployed as the 5th Field Artillery Regiment to fight at Montdidier-Noyon, Aisne-Marne, St. Mihiel, Meuse-Argonne, Lorraine 1917, Lorraine 1918, and Picardy. Captain Charles S. Chapman Sr. commanded the force through all 5 major battles of WW I, returning to Fullerton, California to resume civilian life.

Remaining with the 1st Infantry Division after reorganizing as Battery D, 5th Field Artillery Battalion, the battalion participated in every major European campaign during World War II. Campaign credits earned were Algeria-French Morocco, Tunisia, Sicily, Normandy, Northern France, Rhineland, Ardennes-Alsace, and Central Europe.

On 15 February 1957, the battalion became the 1st Field Artillery Battalion, 5th Artillery (a parent regiment under the Combat Arms Regimental System), on 20 April 1960 became the 1st Rocket Howitzer Battalion, 5th Artillery, and on 20 January 1964 became the 1st Battalion, 5th Artillery. On 1 September 1971 the battalion became the 1st Battalion, 5th Field Artillery.

In late 1965, the battalion was again deployed, to Vietnam. During Operation Fishhook in October 1968, Lieutenant Colonel Charles C. Rogers, the Battalion Commander, received the Medal of Honor for gallantry and leadership at Firebase Rita. The battalion won eleven campaign streamers for their actions in the Republic of Vietnam.

Two soldiers from the 1st Battalion, 5th Field Artillery Regiment speaking with post-Saddam Iraqi police (August 2011).

The 1st Battalion, 5th Field Artillery deployed in January 1991 for Operation Desert Shield and Desert Storm and became the first artillery unit in the division to be credited with destroying an Iraqi tank with a Copperhead projectile. "Hamilton's Own" also participated in the largest artillery raid ever conducted. 1-5 FA fired a total of 5,313 rounds during combat operations. This made 1-5 FA the most active 155mm battalion out of the 28 155mm battalions that participated in the Gulf War The unit earned the Defense of Saudi Arabia and the Liberation and Defense of Kuwait streamers.

From 23 July to 16 August 2002, 1st BN was assigned to assist with fires in Oregon from 23 July through 16 August. They were first assigned to the Monument Fire near Unity, OR and then moved to the Tiller Complex near Tiller.

In September 2003, the 1st Battalion, 5th Field Artillery deployed for Operation Iraqi Freedom and returned to Fort Riley in September 2004. The battalion has participated in almost every major conflict and earning 60 campaign streamers and numerous unit citations for gallantry in battle. Today, "Hamilton's Own" serves at Fort Riley, Kansas and provides Paladin fire support to the 1st Brigade Combat Team of the 1st Infantry Division.

In December 2005, the battalion's AN/TPQ-36 Firefinder Radar Section was deployed in support of Operation Iraqi Freedom 4 & 5. The team was deployed to FOB McKynzy (Samarrah East Airfields) where they supported 1-8 Infantry, 4th ID out of Fort Carson, Colorado. Some time later during the deployment, the team of seven were relocated to FOB Palawada, located near Balad east of LSA Anaconda. After a year's deployment the team returned home in late 2006 to support the battalion's mission of training MIT teams to deploy to various theaters of operations.

From June through December 2011, 1st Battalion, 5th Field Artillery deployed to Kirkuk, Iraq in support of Operation New Dawn at FOB WARRIOR. Leaving for Kuwait that December, they were among the last U.S. troops in Iraq. Redeployed to Fort Riley mid December 2011.

== 2nd Battalion ==
The mission of the 2nd Battalion, 5th Field Artillery, was to prepare for combat and, on order, deploy to a designated contingency area by air, land, and sea to provide fires in support of full spectrum operations.

The battalion was constituted on 2 March 1899 in the Regular Army as Battery O, 7th Regiment of Artillery, then organized on 19 March 1899 at Washington Barracks, District of Columbia. It was reconstituted in the Regular Army as Battery B, 5th Field Artillery in January 1907, and organized in May 1907 from existing units at Fort Leavenworth, Kansas, and the Philippines. The battalion accrued four Civil War battle streamers from existing units at the time of its formation.

The unit was reorganized and redesignated as Battery B, 5th Field Artillery. It was assigned to the 1st Expeditionary Division (later 1st Division) in June 1917 and departed for France in July 1917. During World War I the unit received credit for seven campaigns and was twice decorated with the French Croix de Guerre with two palms. After returning to the United States, the unit was inactivated at Camp Bragg, North Carolina. It was then reactivated at Madison Barracks, New York in December 1939. In October 1940, the unit was reorganized and redesignated as Battery B, 5th Field Artillery Battalion. It departed for England in August 1942 in support of the 1st Infantry Division. During World War II, the 5th Field Artillery Battalion as a whole saw action in eight campaigns.

The unit was redesignated as Headquarters and Headquarters Battery, 2nd Howitzer Battalion, 5th Artillery in June 1958 and activated on 25 June in Germany as part of Operation Gyroscope, an Army experiment in rotating units from CONUS to OCONUS "in total". It was re-designated as 2nd Battalion, 5th Field Artillery on 25 June 1964. The battalion was assigned to 1st Infantry Division on 15 April 1983 at Fort Riley, Kansas (reflagging the existing 1st Battalion, 7th Field Artillery Regiment, direct support to 2nd Brigade), and then moved to Neu-Ulm, Germany as the DS FA BN for 3rd Brigade, 1st Infantry Division (aka 1st ID Forward). This movement occurred in June 1986 (trading places with 4th Battalion, 5th Field Artillery) as part of the U.S. Army's COHORT program experiment. In that study, 8 battalions (4 CONUS, 4 OCONUS) participated in a 3-year study to determine if the company level COHORT program could be extended to the battalion level. Unfortunately, the same company level issues of lack of upward mobility and increased unit friction served to end the COHORT program for good.

The battalion was inactivated and relieved from assignment to the 1st Infantry Division on 15 August 1991. Elements of this unit deployed to Saudi Arabia (without equipment) to support VII Corps' arrival in the Kuwait Theater of Operations (KTO). This mission was performed by the 1st Inf Div (Mech)(Fwd) Port Support Activity (PSA), a brigade-level unit that consisted of two identical 725-man battalion task forces that included tankers, infantrymen, artillerymen, engineers, medics, mechanics and communication specialists from all units of the 1st Inf Div (Mech)(Fwd). Headquarters, 3rd Brigade, 1st Inf Div (Mech) was the headquarters that supervised this effort. This mission, known as "Operation Desert Duty", was completed on 17–18 February 91, and the brigade began departing the KTO on 19 February 91.

On 16 April 1996, the battalion was reactivated at Fort Sill, Oklahoma, where it gained the distinction of being the first battalion to equip with the M109A6 Paladin self-propelled howitzer.

In 2000, 2-5th Field Artillery executed a battery (+) deployment to Kuwait, in direct support of Task Force Garry Owen, led by the 3rd Squadron, 7th Cavalry Regiment, an element of the 3rd Infantry Division. In Kuwait, the 2-5th Field Artillery fired more than 1,700 projectiles. Another deployment to Fort Knox, Kentucky resulted in a second battery (+) deployment, firing more than 1,650 projectiles for the United States Military Academy (USMA) mounted maneuver training. Three detachments deployed to Fort Hood, Texas, to support Ulchi Focus Lens and the 1st Cavalry Warfighter exercise. At Fort Sill, Oklahoma, 2-5th Field Artillery executed six battery ARTEPs, a battalion ARTEP and two Janus/fire simulation TOC exercises.

In April 2003, 2-5 FA was deployed to southwest Asia in support of Operation Iraqi Freedom. The battalion was attached to the 3rd Armored Cavalry Regiment (3rd ACR). The Unit conducted operations in the Al Anbar province. It was tasked with restoring order to Ar Ramadi for six months. In October 2003, 2-5 was re assigned to Al Asad Airbase, also in the Anbar region. Elements of the unit trained the Iraqi Civil Defense Corps (ICDC00 at FOB Eden near Hit, Iraq. On 2 November 2003, the unit lost 6 soldiers when a CH-47 Chinook was shot down near Fallujah. Near the end of November 2003 2-5 and the 3rd ACR participated in Operation Rifles Blitz. 2nd Battalion 5th Field Artillery re deployed to Fort Sill in April 2004.

In 2006, the 212th Field Artillery Brigade was reorganized and redesignated as the 214th Fires Brigade, a modular field artillery brigade. As part of the reorganization, 3rd Battalion, 13th Field Artillery was reassigned to the 75th Fires Brigade. In October 2006, the 2nd Battalion, 5th Field Artillery, previously serving with the 212th Field Artillery Brigade, was assigned to the 214th Fires Brigade.

Bravo Battery deployed in support of Operation Iraqi Freedom in February 2010, and returned to Fort Sill in 2011.

2-5 FA was inactivated in 2014, with a small group remaining to complete unit-level turn-in of equipment.

== 3rd Battalion ==
3rd Battalion shares all of the lineage of the regiment, and served in Germany in the 1980s.

== 4th Battalion ==
The battalion was originally constituted on 13 February 1901 as the 29th Battery, Field Artillery, Artillery Corps, and was subsequently organized in September 1901 at Camp Columbia, Havana, Cuba. On 31 May 1907 it was reorganized and redesignated as Battery C, 5th Field Artillery (Light), and on 8 June 1917 was assigned to the 1st Expeditionary Division (subsequently the 1st Infantry Division). The unit was inactivated on 1 October 1933 and activated on 5 December 1939.

On 1 October 1940 the unit was reorganized and redesignated as Battery C, 5th Field Artillery Battalion. It was absorbed on 15 December 1941 by Battery A, 5th Field Artillery Battalion which inactivated on 15 February 1957 at Fort Riley, Kansas.

The former Battery C, 5th Field Battalion reconstituted 26 August 1960 in the Regular Army; concurrently consolidated with Headquarters and Headquarters Battery, 4th Missile Battalion, 5th Artillery and the consolidated unit was designated as Headquarters and Headquarters Battery, 4th Missile Battalion, 5th Artillery. On 1 September 1971 the unit was redesignated (less Headquarters and Headquarters Battery, 4th Missile Battalion, 5th Artillery) as the 4th Missile Battalion, 5th Field Artillery.

On 28 February 1983 the unit was redesignated as the 4th Battalion, 5th Field Artillery, assigned to the 1st Infantry Division, and activated in Neu Ulm, Germany. This reorganization was conducted with the soldiers and equipment of the former 2nd Battalion, 33rd Field Artillery. It served in a DS (direct support) role with the 3rd Brigade (equipped with M109A2/3 howitzers) until relieved in position by 2nd Battalion, 5th FA, and then took over 2nd Battalion's mission of DS to 2nd Brigade at Fort Riley, Kansas.

4th Battalion earned the unofficial nickname 'Bore Busters' as a play on the name 'boar' after the ammunition platoon non-commissioned officer in charge killed an animal of the same name, with the platoon leader's .45 service pistol at the ammunition supply point for the battalion, in Grafenwoehr, Germany training area in 1985. A boar's head with crossed cannons on a plaque was mounted in the Battalion HQs for many years.

The battalion deployed in January 1991 for Operation Desert Shield and Desert Storm DS to 2nd Brigade, noted for being the first unit on site to secure the surrender location in Safwan. The unit earned the Defense of Saudi Arabia, Liberation and Defense of Kuwait, and Cease-Fire campaign streamers.

The battalion was inactivated on 16 February 1996 as part of the army's reorganization. Most soldiers and equipment were assigned to the newly activated 4th Battalion, 1st Field Artillery.

== 5th Battalion ==
5th Battalion shares all of the lineage of the regiment, and served as the Direct Support Battalion of the 187th Infantry Brigade (Separate) of the U.S. Army Reserve. Both units were inactivated after Desert Storm.

== Honors (1st Battalion only) ==
=== Campaign participation credit ===
- Revolutionary Wars:
1. Long Island;
2. Trenton;
3. Princeton;
4. Brandy Wine;
5. Germantown;
6. Monmouth;
7. Yorktown;
8. Rhode Island;
9. New Jersey 1776;
10. New Jersey 1777;
11. New Jersey 1780;
12. New York 1776
- War of 1812:
1. Louisiana 1814;
2. Louisiana 1815
- Mexican War:
1. Vera Cruz;
2. Cerro Gordo;
3. Contreas;
4. Chapultepec
- Civil War:
1. Valley;
2. Manassas;
3. Antietam;
4. Chancellorsville;
5. Gettysburg;
6. Virginia 1861
- Indian Wars:
1. Miami;
2. Creeks;
3. Seminoles;
4. Little Big Horn;
5. Pine Ridge
- War with Spain:
1. Santiago
- Philippine Insurrection
1. Cavite;
2. Luzon 1899;
3. Samar 1900;
4. Samar 1901
- World War I:
1. Montdidier-Noyon;
2. Aisne-Marne;
3. St. Mihiel;
4. Meuse-Argonne;
5. Lorraine 1917;
6. Lorraine 1918;
7. Picardy 1918
- World War II:
1. Algeria-French Morocco;
2. Tunisia;
3. Sicily (with arrowhead);
4. Normandy (with arrowhead);
5. Northern France
6. Rhineland
7. Ardennes-Alsace
8. Central Europe
- Vietnam:
1. Defense;
2. Counteroffensive;
3. Counteroffensive, Phase II;
4. Counteroffensive, Phase III;
5. Tet Counteroffensive;
6. Counteroffensive, Phase IV;
7. Counteroffensive, Phase V;
8. Counteroffensive, Phase VI;
9. Tet 69/Counteroffensive;
10. Summer-Fall 1969;
11. Winter-Spring 1970
- Southwest Asia:
1. Defense of Saudi Arabia;
2. Liberation and Defense of Kuwait;
3. Cease-Fire
- War on Terrorism
Campaign needs to be determined

=== Decorations ===
- Valorous Unit Award for AL ANBAR PROVINCE
- Meritorious Unit Commendation (Army) for VIETNAM 1966–1967
- Meritorious Unit Commendation (Army) for VIETNAM 1967–1968
- Meritorious Unit Commendation (Army) for 2011
- Meritorious Unit Commendation (Army) for 2014–2015
- Superior Unit Award for 1992–1993
- French Croix de Guerre with Palm, World War I for LORRAINE-PICARDY
- French Croix de Guerre with Palm, World War I for AISNE-MARNE and MEUSE-ARGONNE
- French Croix de Guerre with Palm, World War II for KASSERINE
- French Croix de Guerre with Palm, World War II for NORMANDY
- French Médaille militaire, Fourragère
- Belgian Fourragère 1940: Cited in the Order of the Day of the Belgian Army for action at MONS and for action at EUPEN-MALMEDY
- Republic of Vietnam Cross of Gallantry with Palm, Streamer embroidered VIETNAM 1965–1968
- Republic of Vietnam Cross of Gallantry with Palm, Streamer embroidered VIETNAM 1969–1970
- Republic of Vietnam Civil Action Honor Medal, First Class, Streamer embroidered VIETNAM 1965–1970

== Notable members ==
- Alexander Hamilton, Founding Commander of oldest surviving active unit
- Edmund L. Gruber, composed the regimental song which later became the Artillery and later the Army Song
- Robert R. McCormick, commanded two batteries during World War I
- Charles C. Rogers, Vietnam Medal of Honor Recipient for actions during Operation Fishhook (1968)

== See also ==
- 5th Air Defense Artillery Regiment – had shared lineage 26 August 1960 – 1 September 1971
- Field Artillery Branch (United States)
- U.S. Army Coast Artillery Corps

== Bibliography ==
- "Distribution of the U. S. Field Artillery, 1866-1909" (PDF). Combined Arms Research Library. 866XAC (2). Archived from the original (PDF) on 14 February 2017.
- Desert Redleg: Artillery Warfare in the First Gulf War by L. Scott Lingamfelter
