= Alonzo Chappel =

American painter (1828-1887)

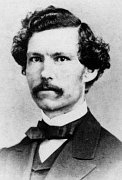
- Alonzo Chappel
- Born: March 1, 1828; New York City, U.S.
- Died: December 4, 1887 (aged 59); Middle Island, New York, U.S.
- Occupation: painter
- Spouse: Almira Stewart

Alonzo Chappel (March 1, 1828 – December 4, 1887) was an American historical painter whose ancestors were French Huguenot. He is best known for paintings depicting personalities and events from the American Revolution and early 19th-century American history.

== Biography ==
Chappel was born in New York City and died in Middle Island, New York.

His 1857 painting Enlisting Foreign Officers is in the collection of the Museum of the American Revolution in Philadelphia.

Many of his paintings appear in the History of the United States of America, by J. A. Spencer. For example, the painting Drafting The Declaration of Independence is an engraving done in 1857.

Chappel's oil painting: Fate of Jane Wells, depicting the Cherry Valley Massacre of November 1778 is in the collection of the Gilcrease Museum in Tulsa, Oklahoma.

== Gallery ==
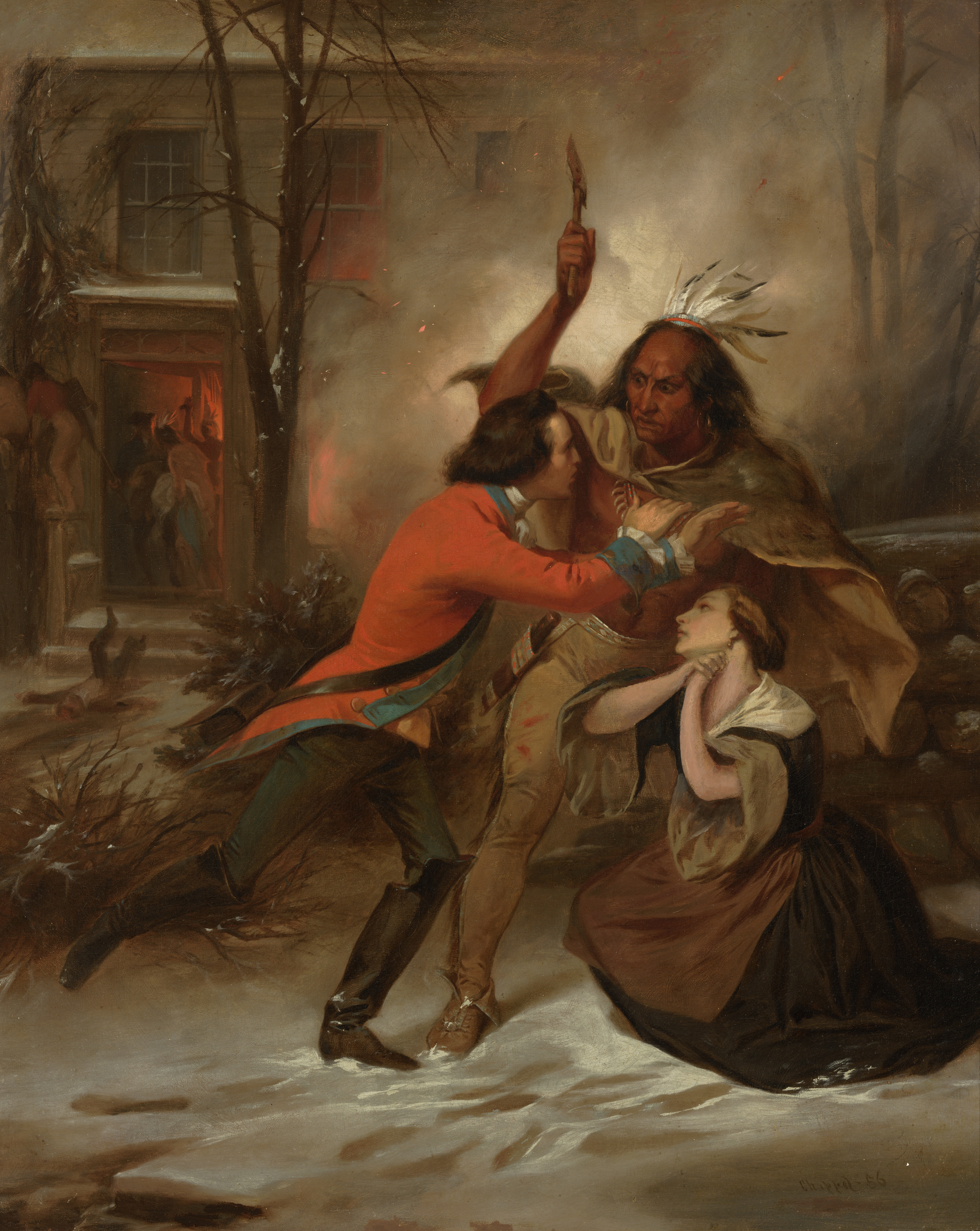
Fate of Jane Wells (1856)

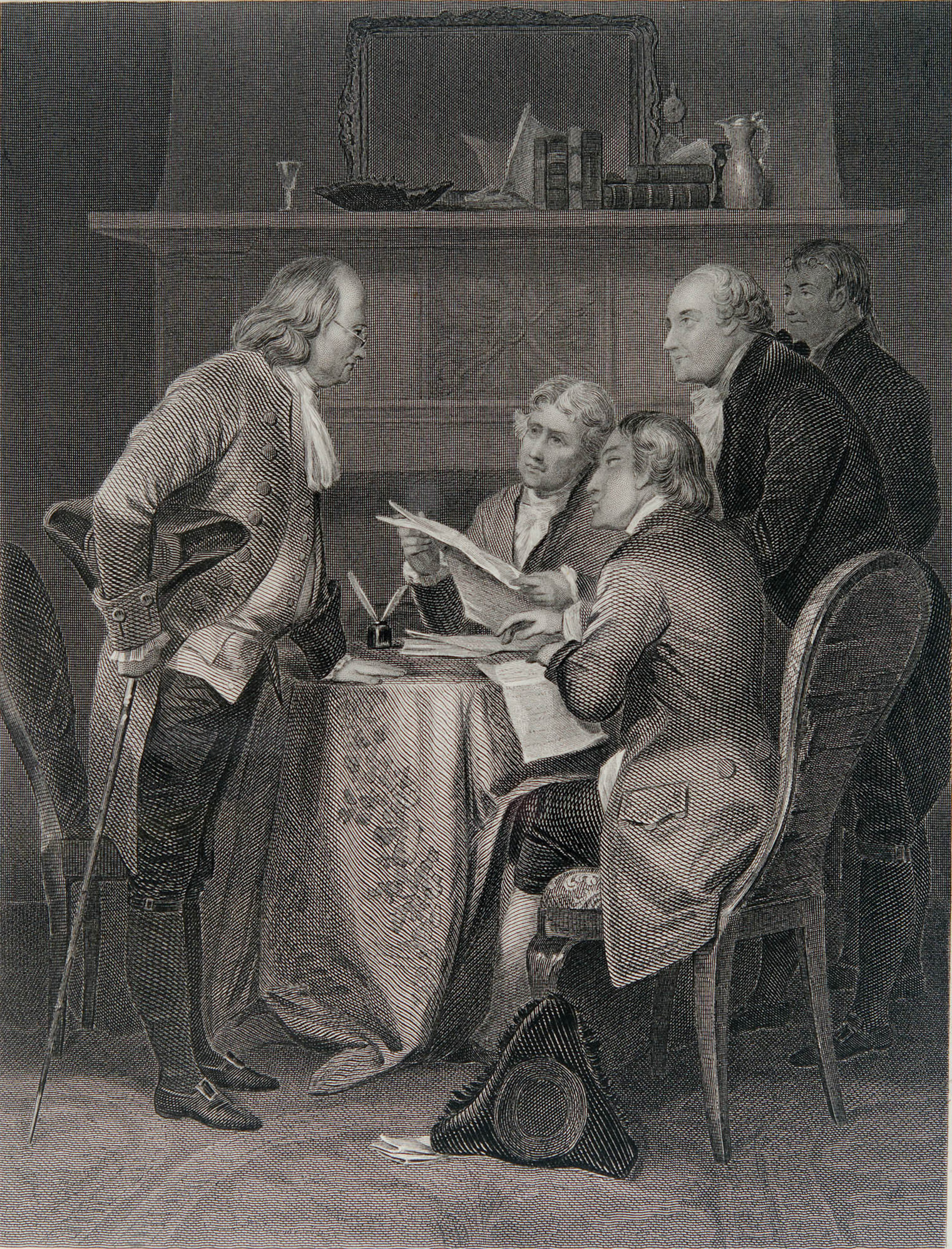
Declaration of Independence (1857)

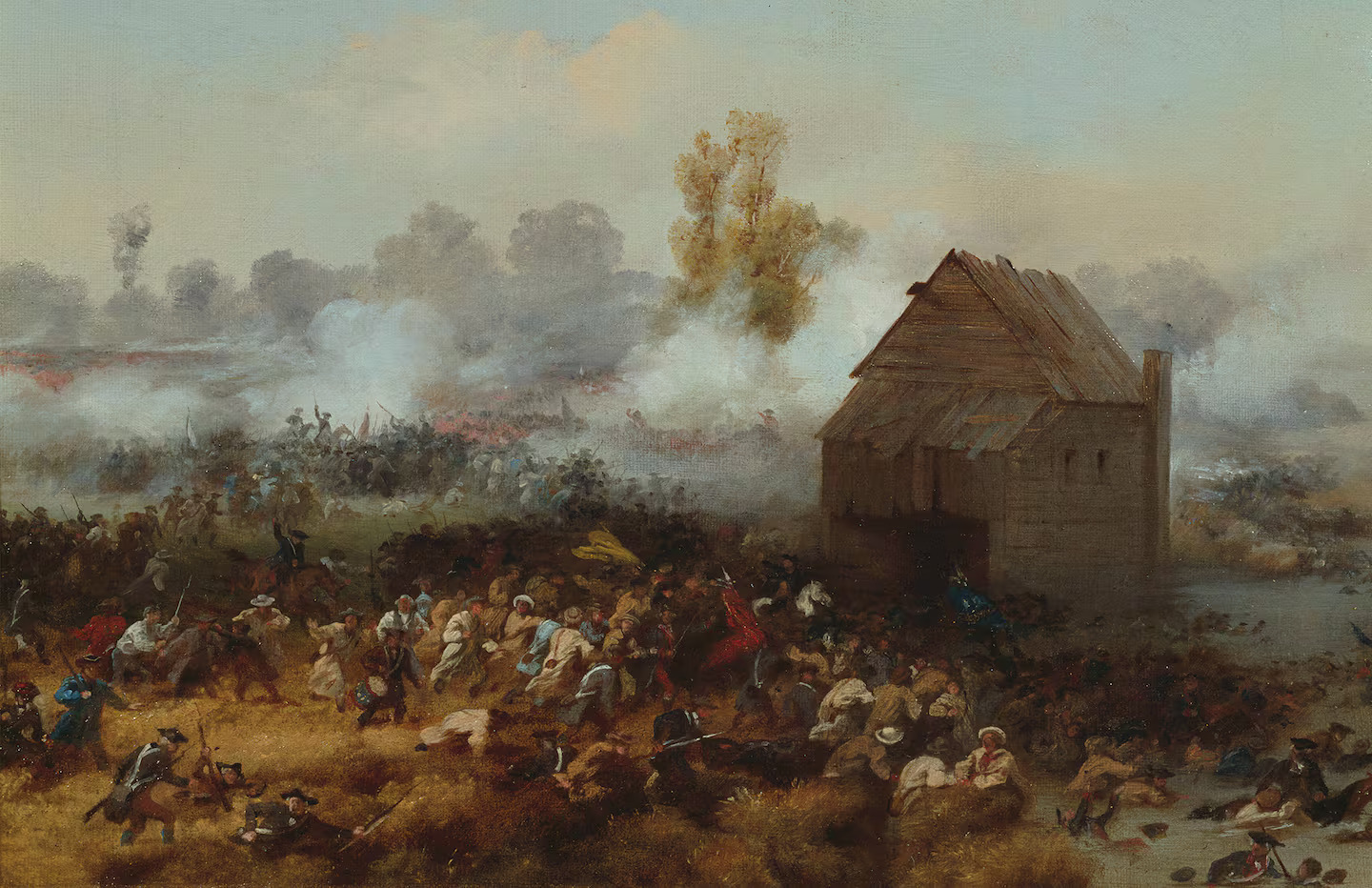
Battle of Long Island (1858)

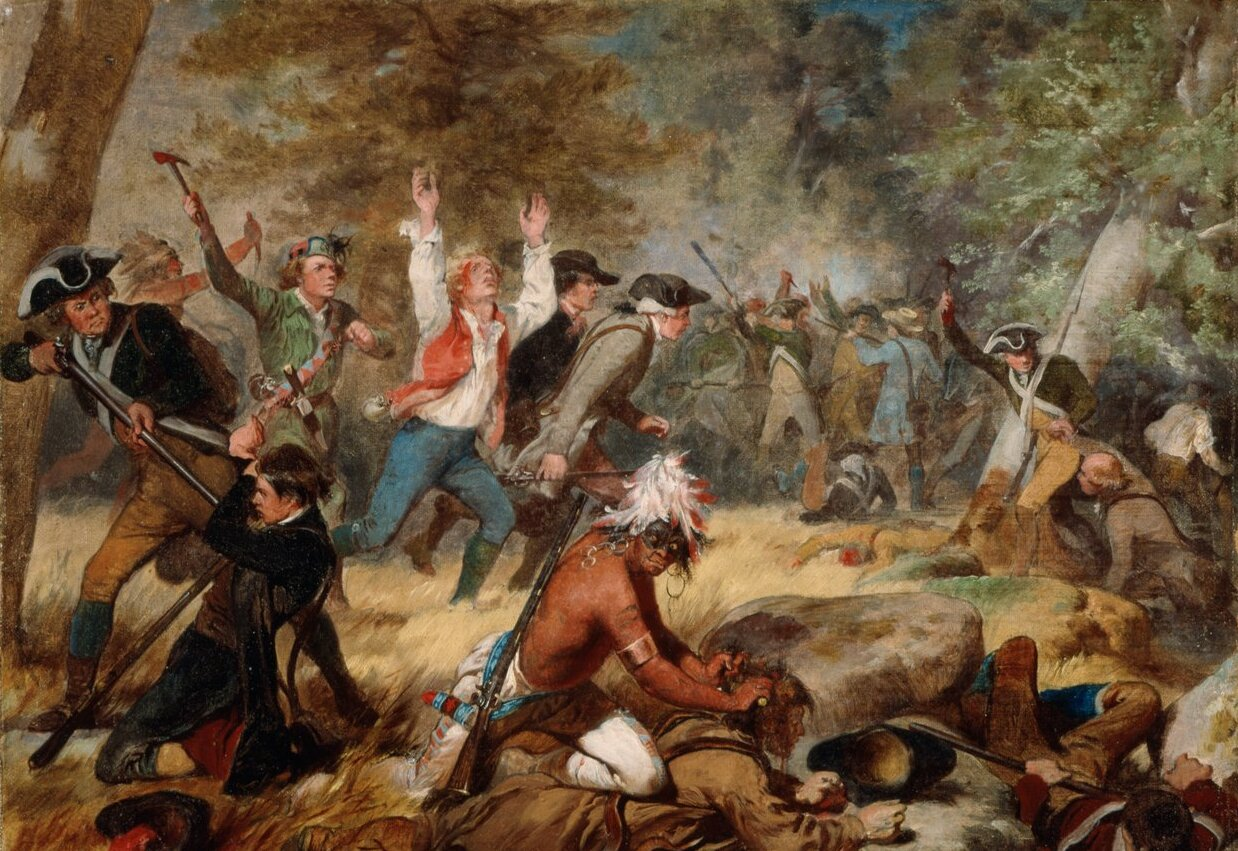
Massacre of Wyoming (Pennsylvania), July 3-4, 1778 (1858)

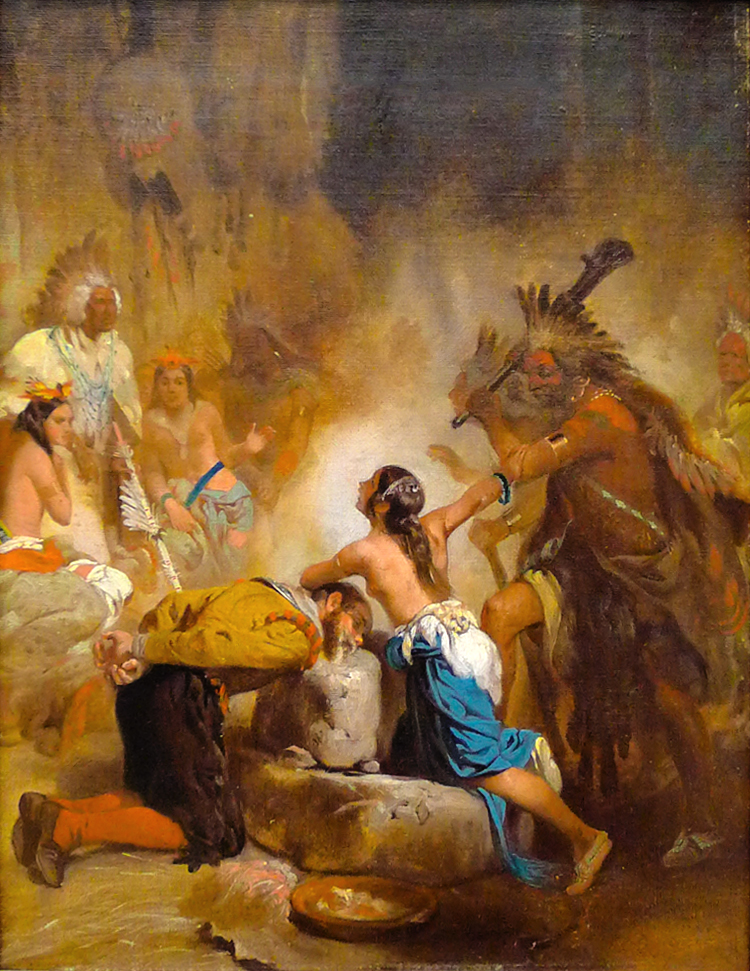
John Smith Saved by Pocahontas (c. 1865)

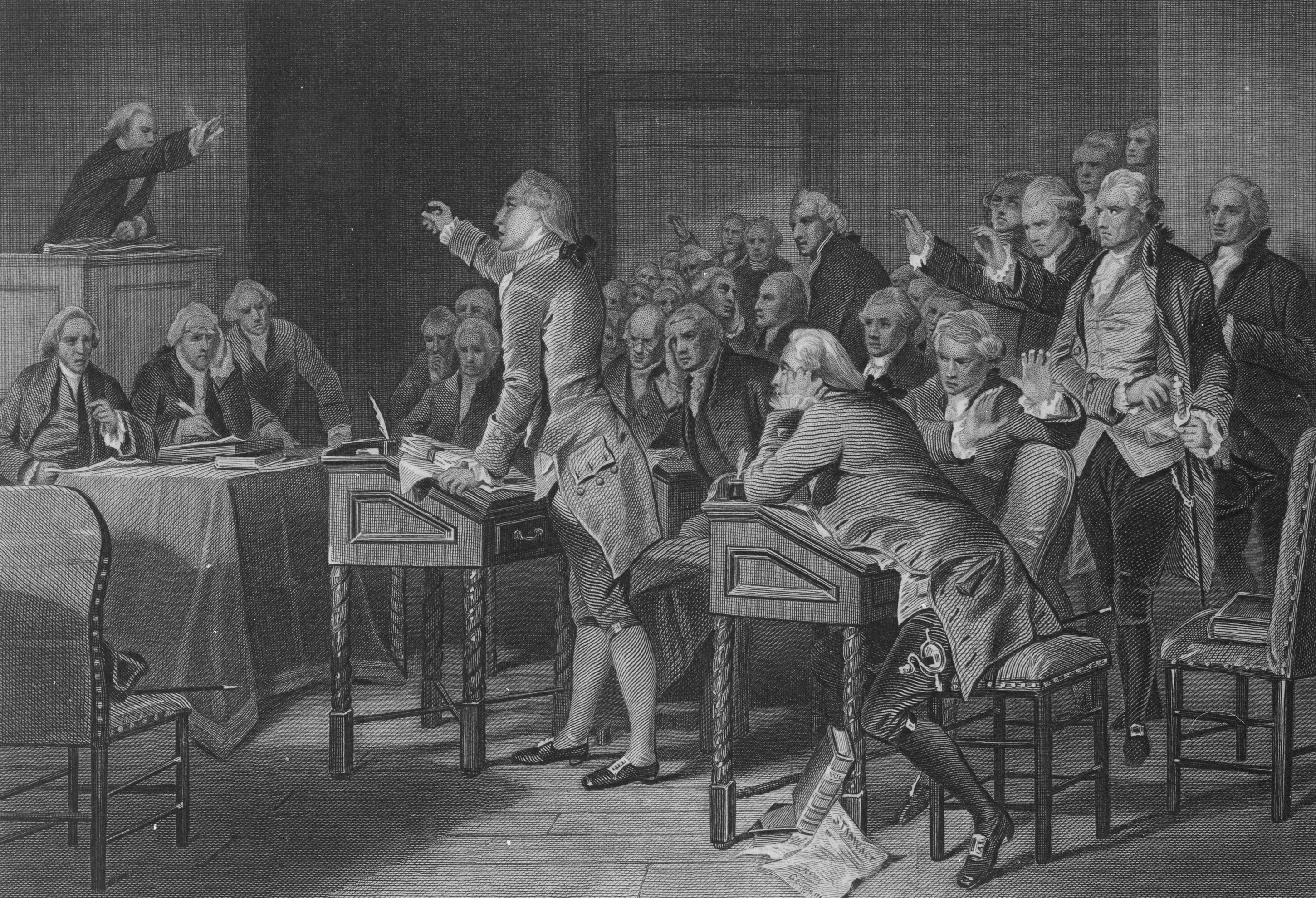
Patrick Henry Addressing the Virginia Assembly (1867)
