= Thomas Bucknall =

British shipbuilder (c. 1705 - c. 1775)

Thomas Bucknall (c.1705–c.1775) was an 18th-century Royal Navy shipbuilder based alternately at Plymouth and Portsmouth.

He is known also to have carved the figureheads on the ships.

== Life and career ==
Little is known of his early life. He was apprenticed as a shipwright, probably in Portsmouth Dockyard, and was placed on the pay roll of the Royal Navy as a Master Mastmaker on 1 November 1728. He was made a Master Caulker on 23 April 1733, and on 19 August 1742 was made Assistant Shipwright at Portsmouth. On 27 May 1752 he was listed Master Shipwright at Portsmouth. On 6 August 1755 he was appointed Master Shipwright of Plymouth in place of John Lock, and from that date had overall control of all shipbuilding and the Royal Navy listed his works.

He retired on 9 October 1772.

== Ships built ==
As ships took a minimum of 2/3 years to build there is a lead-in period before the Navy lists his works, and only those fully built under Bucknall are listed (none from his first three years at Portsmouth were under his full control so the list begins in Plymouth):

- HMS Pembroke (1757) 60-gun ship of the line
- HMS Brilliant (1757) 36-gun frigate later sold to the East India Company
- HMS Adventure (1758) 32-gun frigate (rebuild of HMS Adventure (1741))
- HMS Hero (1759) 74-gun ship of the line with a crew of 550

Buchnall then returned to Portsmouth in May 1762 and built:

- HMS Britannia (1762) – a huge 100-gun ship of the line with a crew of 850 men, had an illustrious career including the Battle of Trafalgar, one of the largest ships ever built at that date nicknamed "Old Ironsides".
- HMS Asia (1764) 64-gun ship of the line
- HMS Warwick (1767) 50-gun ship of the line
- HMS Ajax (1767) 74-gun ship of the line
- HMS Worcester (1769) 64-gun ship of the line
- HMS Falcon (1771) 14-gun sloop
- HMS Medina (1772) 6-gun yacht
