= HMS Asia (1764) =

Third-rate ship of the line of the Royal Navy

- Ship plan of Asia

History

Great Britain
- Name: HMS Asia
- Ordered: 20 March 1758
- Builder: Edward Allin & Thomas Bucknall, Portsmouth Dockyard
- Laid down: 18 April 1758
- Launched: 3 March 1764
- Commissioned: March 1771
- Decommissioned: March 1802
- In service: 1771-1781; 1782-1783; 1790-1800; 1801-1802
- Fate: Broken up, 1804

General characteristics
- Class & type: 64-gun third-rate ship of the line
- Tons burthen: 136446/94 (bm)
- Length: 158 ft 0 in (48.2 m) (gundeck)
- Beam: 44 ft 6 in (13.6 m)
- Draught: 10 ft 2 in (3.1 m) forward; 16 ft 6 in (5.03 m) aft
- Depth of hold: 18 ft 10 in (5.7 m)
- Propulsion: Sails
- Sail plan: Full-rigged ship
- Armament: Gundeck: 26 × 24-pounder guns; Upper gundeck: 26 × 18-pounder guns; QD: 10 × 4-pounder guns; Fc: 2 × 9-pounder guns

HMS Asia was a 64-gun third-rate ship of the line of the Royal Navy, built by Thomas Bucknall and launched on 3 March 1764 at Portsmouth Dockyard. She participated in the American Revolutionary War and the capture of Martinique in 1794. She was broken up in 1804.

== Design ==
Sir Thomas Slade designed her as an experimental design, one that proved to be particularly groundbreaking as she was the first true 64. As a result, the Royal Navy ordered no further 60-gun ships but instead commissioned more 64 gun ships. Because these incorporated alterations learned from trials with Asia, for instance subsequent ships were bigger, she was the only ship of her draught (class).

== Service ==
=== American Revolutionary War ===
Asia saw early service in the American Revolutionary War, as a transport vessel for 500 Royal Marines sent to New York City in 1774 to quell rising tensions among the local population. She arrived in New York Harbor on 4 December and remained there until later in the month when she joined a flotilla commanded by Admiral Richard Howe. But on 1 January 1775 she was part of Vice-Admiral Graves' North American Squadron, listed under command of Cpt. Geo Vanderput.

Returning to New York Harbor, Asia supplied protection for the merchant ship Duchess of Gordon, which Royal governor William Tryon had established as an ad hoc office in October 1775. He feared arrest by the rebels if he remained in the city.

Asia was the ship on which Tryon and Loyalist Mayor David Mathews devised a plot to assassinate George Washington. Thomas Hickey, one of Washington's Life Guard, was executed for this plot.

She was present at the Battle of Brooklyn in August 1776, and later survived a fire ship attack led by American revolutionary Silas Talbot. The fire ship did foul Asia and set fire to her, but the crew, aided by men from other nearby vessels, were able to extinguish the flames.

In 1778-89 she escorted some East Indiamen to India.

=== French Revolutionary Wars ===
Capture of Fort Saint Louis, Martinique, 1794, with Asia in the background, and Zebra in the foreground

Asia was recommissioned in May 1793 under Captain John Brown and on 26 December he sailed her to the West Indies to join Admiral Sir John Jervis. In March 1794, Asia participated in the capture of Martinique by an expeditionary force under the command of Jervis and Lieutenant General Sir Charles Grey. The British were able by 16 March to capture all the forts, except Fort Bourbon and Fort Royal.

On 20 March she and Zebra were supposed to enter the Carenage at Fort Royal to fire on Fort Saint Louis. However, Asia did not get into position. Her pilot, M. de Tourelles, who had been a lieutenant of the port, reneged on his agreement to take her in, ostensibly because of a fear of shoals. Instead, Zebra went in alone, with her captain, Richard Faulknor, and crew landing under the guns of the fort and capturing it. Asia returned to England in July 1794. The next month Captain John M'Dougall assumed command as she joined the Downs squadron.

On 29 April 1796, Asia again faced a possible fire, this time in Port Royal, Jamaica. The fire was self-inflicted in that part of a recently stored delivery of 300 powder barrels on the lower gun deck exploded. Some 300 of the vessel's crew jumped overboard in order to escape the consequences should the nearby main magazine explode. Asia's captain, officers, and a few of the remaining crew were able to put out the fire. In all, the vessel lost 11 men killed and wounded.

From 1796 she was under the command of Captain Robert Murray, and in 1800 she sailed for Halifax, and arrived on 31 May. Here she picked up a group of 600 Jamaican Maroons who had been deported from Jamaica the previous year and were now to be transferred to Sierra Leone. She departed on 8 August and arrived in Sierra Leone on 30 September, disembarking there the group who came to be called the Jamaican Maroons in Sierra Leone.

== Fate ==
Asia was paid off in March 1802. She was broken up in August 1804 at Chatham Dockyard.
