= Liberty Boys =

Dissident organization during the American Revolution

Liberty Boys True-Born Sons of Liberty
- The Rebellious Stripes Flag
- Leader: See below
- Dates active: 1765–1776
- Active regions: Thirteen Colonies
- Ideology: Radical Patriots; Initial phase: "No taxation without representation" Rights of Englishmen; Later phase: Classical liberalism Republicanism; Separatism
- Status: Merged into Sons of Liberty and Continental Army
- Part of: Radical branch of Sons of Liberty

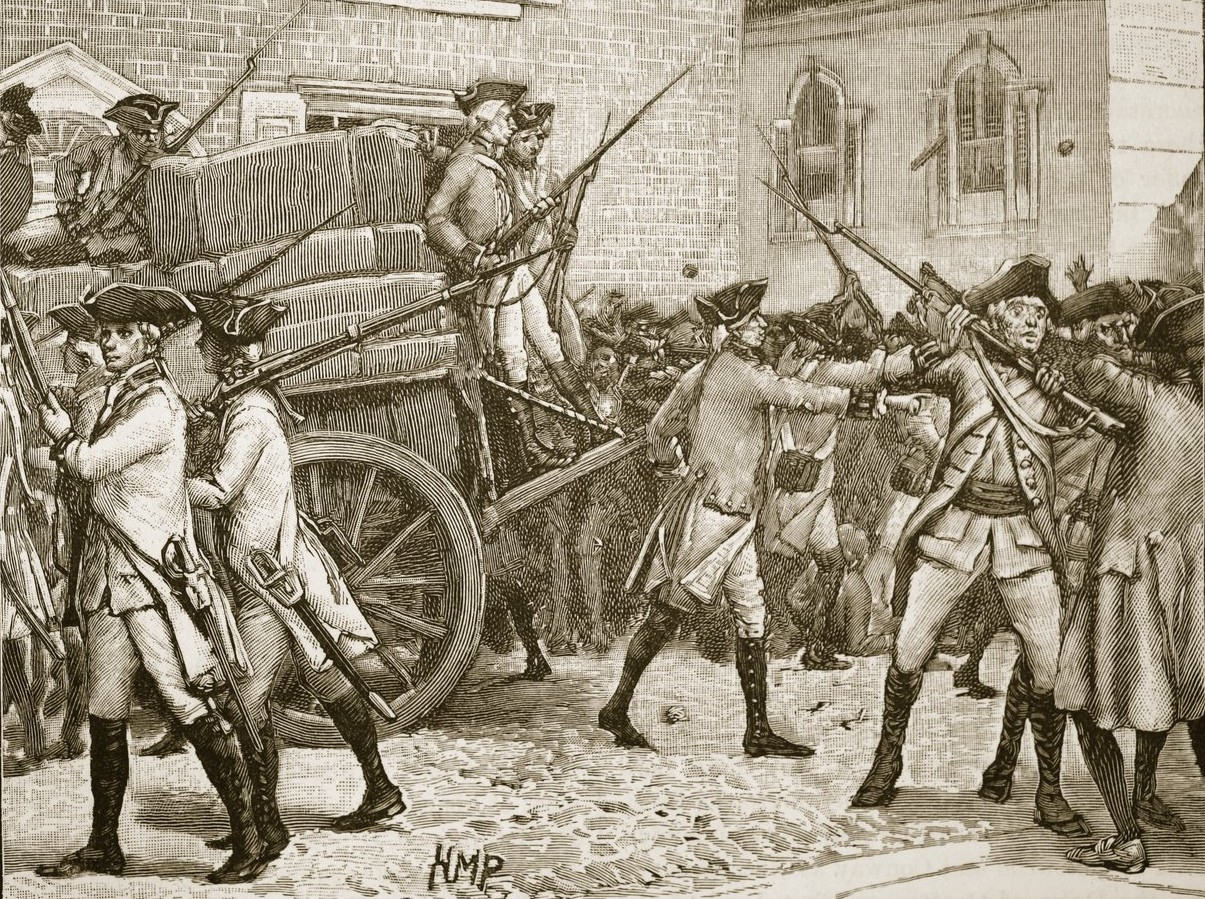
Troops escorting the stamped paper to the City Hall New York in 1766, protecting it from the Liberty Boys

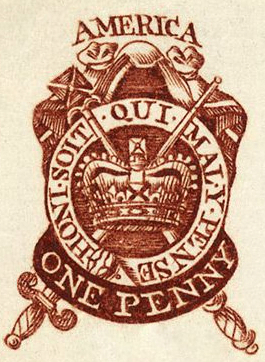
1765 one penny stamp, with St. Edward Crown

One of the five Liberty Boys' Liberty pole in New York City in 1770

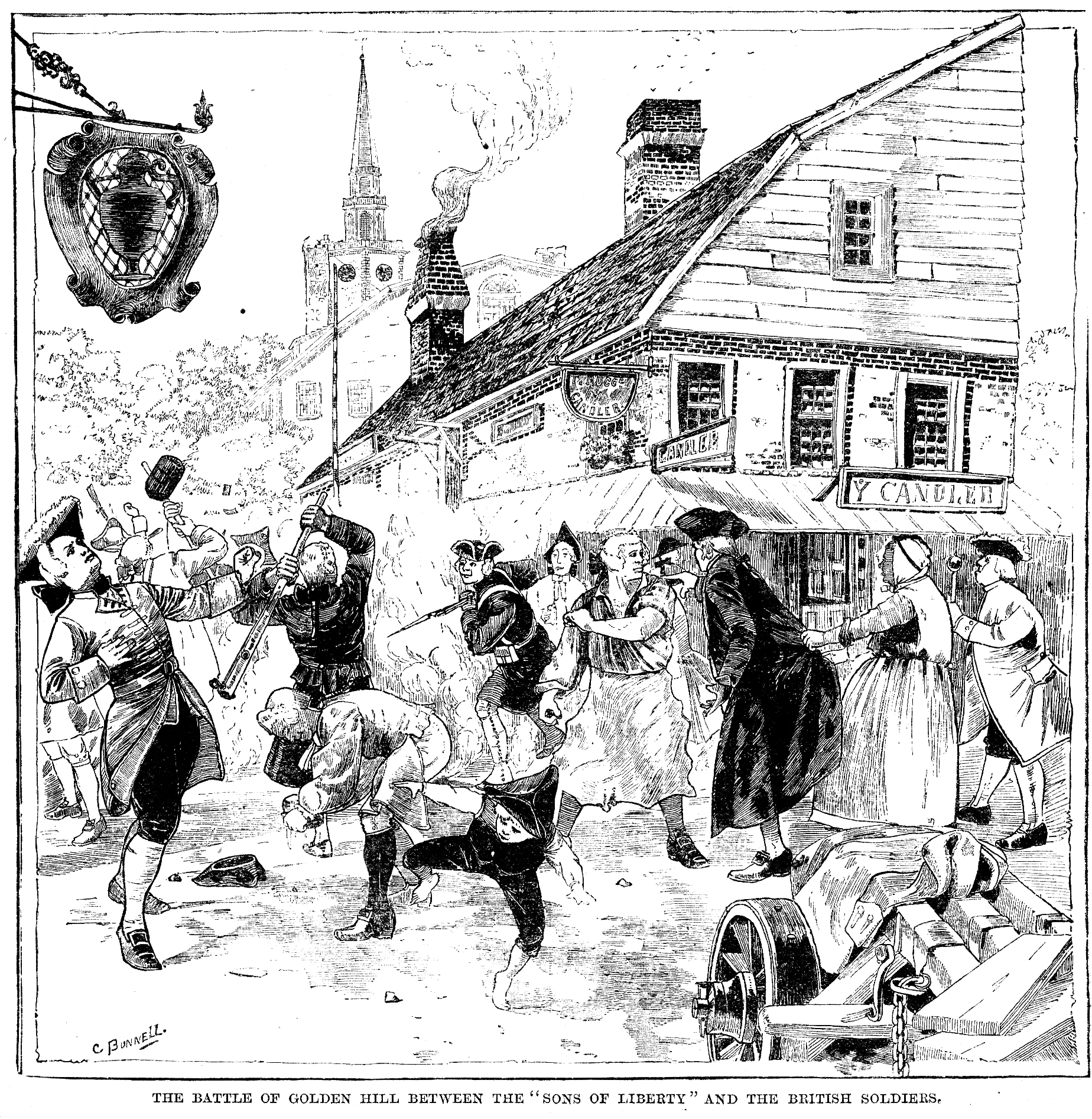
Battle of Golden Hill, between British troops and Liberty Boys, in New York CIty on January 19, 1770

The Liberty Boys were a branch of the Sons of Liberty in New York City during the 1760s and 1770s. True-Born Sons of Liberty was also a title used by the Liberty Boys. The Liberty Boys are known for being more radical and often more violent than the Sons of Liberty. While many American Colonial cities had Liberty Boys, the most active was the New York Liberty Boys. Both the Liberty Boys and the Sons of Liberty opposed the repressive policies of British rule. The Liberty Boys were active in protests, riots, intimidation, and the installation of Liberty Poles. The Liberty Boys took part in the Battle of Golden Hill on January 19, 1770, years before the 1776 American Revolution. They were very active in opposition to the Stamp act of 1765 and the Tea Act of 1773. Isaac Sears was a key leader of the New York Liberty Boys, as he was quick to use violence. Marinus Willett was a key leader in the Liberty Boys' arms raids. The Stamp Act of 1765 became a major cause for unity against British rule. Liberty Boys often called for the boycott of British goods and promoted goods from the Daughters of Liberty. By the time of the American Revolutionary War, the Liberty Boys provided both men and arms for the conflict.

== New York and Stamp Act of 1765 ==
Liberty Boys started as a secret group to avoid capture or arrest while carrying out acts against the British Empire's rule over the Thirteen Colonies. Their activities were sometimes carried out secretly to hide illicit and illegal actions against British rule. Some of the early actions were in opposition to the British Stamp Act of 1765, passed on March 22, 1765, imposed on the Colonies. The Stamp Act of 1765 imposed taxation and a monopoly on the American colonies. The monopoly of the act was that it mandated that every colonists had to purchase a British stamp, or stamped paper, for every official document they used, including newspapers, playing cards and almanacs. The required stamp had a picture of a Tudor rose and the words America, also in French Honi soit qui mal y pense, which translates into Shame to him who thinks evil of it. One other stamp was also used, which had a scepter-and-sword background, and with St. Edward’s Crown encircled by the Order of the Garter logo. The taxation also denied colonial representation in the British Parliament or local colonial rule. In response, the Liberty Boys destroyed property and intimidated royal tax officials. The Liberty Boys prevented the implementation of the Stamp Act. The Liberty Boys were made up of many New York City merchants, artisans, and laborers. The first ship with British stamps docked at New York City's harbor on October 23, 1765. Liberty Boys, with about 2,000 patriotic residents, came to the harbor and protested. The Liberty Boys and the patriotic mob shut down the New York port. The Liberty Boys' intimidation acts included: hanging effigies of royal officials, threats and tarring and feathering. These intimidations worked, as all British stamp agents resigned their posts, and the Stamp Act was never enforced. The Stamp Act was repealed by Parliament on March 18, 1766, after an in-person appeal by Benjamin Franklin to British Parliament. But in response, the British Parliament passed the Declaratory Act, stating that the British crown and government had total legislative control and power over the 13 colonies, setting the stage for further rebellion. An orderly and non-intimidating response to the Stamp Act was made at the October 1765 Stamp Act Congress.

== New York Committee of Correspondence and Committee of Mechanics ==
On October 31, 1765, New York founded a Committee of Correspondence. A large meeting of New Yorkers was held where five leaders were voted in. The leaders were: John Lamb, Isaac Sears, Gershom Mott, Thomas Robinson, and William Wiley. Both John Lamb and Isaac Sears were also active leaders in the Liberty Boys. A number of cities in the Colonies founded Committees of Correspondence to coordinate opposition to British Acts. The Committees help unite the Colonies by coordinating letter-writing and establishing an underground communication network among Patriot leaders. By 1774, Isaac Sears and Alexander McDougall, with many New York working-class members, founded the more radical "Committee of Mechanics", which challenged the official Committee of Correspondence delegates. In July 1774, the Committee of Mechanics held meetings to challenge the appointment of moderate delegates to the Continental Congress, advocating for a stricter stance against British actions following the Coercive Acts. On May 29, 1776, the "New York General Committee of Mechanics in union" sent a petition to the New York Provincial Congress to support independence from Britain. The petition was read to the New York Provincial Congress by Committee of Mechanics member and New York craftsman, Lewis Thibou. This New York Mechanics Declaration of Independence, with a list of grievances against the British Crown, predates the July 4, 1776 Declaration of Independence by Thomas Jefferson.

== Fort George riot ==
Liberty Boys, including Isaac Sears, John Lamb, and Alexander McDougall, led a colonial mob of over 2,000 to Fort George, in lower Manhattan, on the night of November 1, 1765. November 1, 1765, was the day the Stamp Act was to be established. On the way to the Fort, the mob stopped at former Stamp Agent, James McEvers’ home and give him a cheer for his resignation on August 30 to Sears and Allicocke, after many threats from the Liberty Boys. The Liberty Boys and the colonial mob went to Fort George, as this was the residence of New York Governor Cadwallader Colden, who had taken refuge there. At the Fort, the Liberty Boys demanded the Governor's resignation and his surrender of the British stamps there. The mob of 2,000 was about one-tenth of the city's population at the time. The Liberty Boys hung a Cadwallader Colden effigy as they marched through the streets. The Liberty Boys and the mob destroyed the British officer's carriage house. Liberty Boys and the mob also took the governor's horse carriage & sleighs, then used them for a "funeral of liberty" bonfire at the nearby Bowling Green park. The governor, seeing the large mob, said he and his officers would not enforce the Stamp Act. The event could have been a Boston Massacre, as the Liberty Boys and the mob tried to provoke the fort's soldiers to shoot at them. Moderate Sons of Liberty leaders were able to calm the mob. The same night, November 1, 1765, the mansion called Ranelagh at the intersection of Anthony Street and West Broadway, belonging to British Royal Artillery Major Thomas James, was ransacked and burned by the Liberty Boys and the city mob. James was a supporter of the Stamp Act and defended Fort George. In January 1766, another British ship docked with more British stamps. But the Liberty Boys seized the stamps and burned them. The Liberty Boys and their mob remained active till May of 1766, when the repeal of the Stamp Act in New York City was official. The Liberty Boys made a flag with Liberty, Property, No Stamps on it in celebration. After the Fort George riot, John Lamb went to Philadelphia, working with the local "Heart and Hand Fire Company"; they were able to force John Hughes to resign. John Hughes was the last Colony Stamp Agent, ending any enforcement of the Stamp Act.

== New York Liberty Poles ==
Another activity of the Liberty Boys was installing Liberty Poles. To celebrate the repeal of the Stamp Act on March 18, 1766, the Liberty Boys installed New York City's first Liberty Pole on May 21, 1766. The Liberty Poles were installed in New York City Hall Park (the Commons), near Montagne’s Tavern. Montagne’s Tavern (also called Montagne House) was a key meeting house for the Liberty Boys and Sons of Liberty. The Liberty Pole was also in view of the British soldier’s barracks. To avoid looking rebellious, the first poles featured an emblem of the British Crown with a note about unfair taxation. A common quote on the poles was George 3rd, Pitt and Liberty. This conveyed colonial honor to King George III and William Pitt for his support of repealing the Stamp Act. The hope was for peaceful liberty and rights for the Colonies. But, British troops cut down the liberty poles. The Liberty Boys held a protest meeting over the removal of the New York Liberty Pole; over 2,000 people attended. British soldiers fired into the meeting and hit a few people, wounding them. After this event, the Liberty Boys started blocking British soldiers from patrolling the streets in Lower Manhattan. Later at night, the Liberty Boys would just put up a new pole. If the two met, violence ensued. The 4th pole was reinforced with iron bands to make removal harder. The fifth Liberty pole was placed on private property to end the cutting down and install a new problem. The liberty poles also served as a rallying location for colonial patriots.

== Battle of Golden Hill ==
The Battle of Golden Hill occurred on January 19, 1770, between Liberty Boys and British soldiers. Due to the 4th Liberty pole's reinforcement with iron bands, on January 16, 1770, British soldiers used gunpowder to remove the 4th Liberty pole. The soldiers used too much gunpowder, and wood shards covered the block, also hit Montagne’s Tavern's door. This pole no longer had a non-rebellious sign on it. On January 19, 1770, there was a brawl over broadside poster. Liberty Boys had been posting rebel posters, while British soldiers were posting posters supporting British rule. Isaac Sears, Walter Quackenbos, and other Liberty Boys tried to stop soldiers from posting handbills. A group of soldiers was surrounded by a mob, and a brawl broke out on what is called Golden Hill in the City of New York. The anger over the "Battle" (brawl) soon subsided, and local politicians and businessmen joined in resolving the problem and even making some reparations. A new fifth Liberty pole was placed on private property.

== Quartering Acts ==
Liberty Boys resisted the British policy of the 1765 and 1774 Quartering Acts. The Liberty Boys' radical protest placed housing and financial hardship on the British soldiers. The Liberty Boys were able to get other New Yorkers to form resistance against the unpopular taxation and housing without representation. The first act of the Quartering Act of 1765 required colonial assemblies to provide housing, supplies, and food for British soldiers stationed in the colonies. The French and Indian War led to the passage of the Quartering Act of 1765. The Quartering Act of 1774 was part of the Coercive Acts, part of the Intolerable Acts. This was a punishment for the repeal of the Stamp Act. The Liberty Boys resisted the Quartering Acts primarily in New York by organized mass protests, intimidation of officials, public propaganda, and physical confrontations. They viewed the acts as unconstitutional taxation, aiming to protect private property and prevent the normalization of a standing British army in New York.

== New York Restraining Act ==
The Liberty Boys and the New York Patriots so effectively resisted the Quartering Act of 1765 that British Parliament passed the New York Restraining Act of 1767 on July 2, 1767. The New York Assembly refused to fully fund the expenses of British soldiers stationed in New York. New Yorkers refused to supply or house General Thomas Gage's 1,500 soldiers there. The New York Assembly agreed with the Liberty Boys and many New Yorkers that the tax was too high, and that it was taxation without representation. Parliament's response was that the governor of New York and the New York Assembly should not pass any new laws or bills until they fully funded the Quartering Act. Fully funding the Quartering Act meant: housing soldiers, feeding soldiers, and providing other supplies for the British soldiers in New York. The New York Assembly rejected the demands of the Quartering Act of 1765 because it imposed no maximum limit on the number of British soldiers they would be required to support, and Parliament had not even discussed or asked New York about the act. But, due to the threats, the New York Assembly agreed to supply some of the British soldiers needs, and New York Restraining Act was never put in place. The New York Assembly ended on April 3, 1775, due to the outbreak of the American Revolutionary War on April 19, 1775, due to the Battle at Lexington and Concord.

== New York Liberty Boys leaders ==
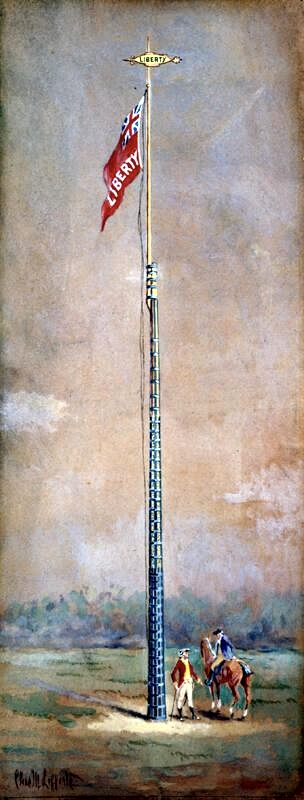
Fifth Liberty Pole, New York Commons, raised by the Liberty Boys

Some of the key New York Liberty Boys Leaders and members were:

- Isaac Sears, Merchant, sailor, agitator, and Liberty Boys key leader, became privateer. Known as a "King Sears. The Sugar Act ended his trading in the West Indies, so he became a rebel against the British Empire. Departed New York before the British invasion and returned to privateering.
- Joseph Allicocke, Early key leader and merchant. Later became a Loyalist.
- John Lamb: Merchant, a leader of the New York chapter. Moved to be a moderate patriot. Became leader of 2nd Continental Artillery Regiment
- Marinus Willett: Cabinetmaker, soldier, and a leader, took street-level actions. Became leader is Continental Army
- Jacobus Van Zandt: Merchant, a leader. Became a Continental Agent for the Continental Army and member of the Provincial Convention of New York.
- Alexander McDougall, Merchant, printed the seditious pamphlet, arrested and released (called the Wilkes of America). Moved to be a moderate patriot. Leader in the Continental Army.
- Walter Quackenbos: Strong defense of the New York Liberty Pole, part of the Battle of Golden Hill.
- William Livingston, James Alexander, and John Morin Scott were New York Lawyers who provided legal and leadership to the Liberty Boys and Sons of Liberty, while all moderate Patriots. Some regard these lawyers as the founders of the New York Sons of Liberty. Livingston became the governor of New Jersey, Alexander and Scott became leaders in the Army.
- Fraunces Tavern and Montagne’s Tavern, near Bowling Green, were the two common meeting spots for the New York Liberty Boys.
- Peter Pra Van Zandt, Nephew of Jacobus Van Zandt, New York merchant, later political delegations and helped manage New York City's defense against British force.

Royal New York Governor Cadwallader Colden wrote a letter to the Earl of Halifax on February 22, 1765. In the letter, he writes about William Livingston, John Morin Scott, and William Smith; they proposed nothing less to themselves than to obtain the direction of all measures of government by making themselves absolutely necessary to every governor, in assisting him when he complied with their measures and distressing him when he did not. For this purpose, every method was employed to aggrandize the power of the Assembly, where the profession of Law must always have influence over its members, and to lessen the authority and influence of the Governor.

== Sons of Neptune ==
Sons of Neptune was a name used by early New York Liberty Boys: John Lamb, John Morin Scott, and Isaac Sears. The Sons of Neptune's goal was to oppose the trade restrictions of the British. The Sons of Neptune worked with sailors and dock workers in the American colonies. The Sons of Neptune predate the Stamp Act riots. Sons of Neptune fought against British government laws that hurt fair trade and unfairly taxed goods, like the Sugar Act of 1764. The American colonies often were required to buy goods only from Britain, often at higher prices. The Sons of Neptune did protests, boycotts, and sometimes intimidation. John Morin Scott was a lawyer and politician. He was a strong supporter of colonial rights. Scott later joined the Sons of Liberty, as the Liberty Boys were too radical for him. John Lamb and Isaac Sears moved over to the Liberty Boys with the start of the Stamp Act riots. John Lamb, John Morin Scott, and Isaac Sears also used the title Free Sons of New York and Vox Populi, Latin phrase meaning "voice of the people".

== Townshend boycott ==
The colonial Townshend boycotts started in 1767 and continued until 1770. The boycotts were promoted by the Liberty Boys and other radical Patriots in response to the Townshend Duties placed on the colonies by British Parliament in 1766 and 1767. The Patriots organized boycotts of goods such as British glass, lead, paint, paper, and tea. Colonists used non-importation agreements to hurt British trade. These non-importation agreements were a stand against the King and British Parliament. On April 12, 1770, British Parliament repealed the Townshend duties, due to the effective boycotts. Prime Minister Lord North oversaw the repeal of duties, but retained the tax on tea and the right to tax the colonies. New York colonial craftsmen, who profited from non-importation agreements, wanted the complete boycott to continue till tax on tea was removed. In New York, there was tension because many other merchants relied on British goods to operate their firms and were hurting. As such, Liberty Boys and other Patriots struggled to maintain the boycott in full. The Liberty Boys used newspapers and posters to try to maintain support for the boycott. Liberty Boys gathered Patriots for a mass meeting on May 30, 1770 and June 5, with the goal to keep up the pressure on merchants to continue the boycott. Liberty Boys threatened social ostracism and vengeance against merchants who ended the boycott. The New York merchants, losing money and going into debt, stopped supporting the boycotts by July 1770. Due to continuing tax on tea and the strong support for the tea boycott, most New York merchants continued to boycott tea. This led to the 1774 New York raids on British tea.

== New York raids ==
New York Tea Party, an engraving: John Lamb, a Liberty Boys leader, reading the Tea Act to a crowd in New York City Hall on December 17, 1773, by John Karst (1836-1922)

The New York Liberty Boys, being more radical and often more violent than the Sons of Liberty, took action in New York City. Two raids on British Tea and four raids that seized British munitions, which were used later in the war. The Raids:

- New York Tea Party on April 18, 1774, and April 22, 1774, rejected and seized British Tea, Leaders: Isaac Sears, Alexander McDougall, John Lamb
- New York Armory Raid on April 23, 1775, seized 600 muskets, bayonets and gunpowder. Leaders: Marinus Willett, Isaac Sears
- Broad Street Raid June 6, 1775, seized cannons, muskets, gunpowder, and other supplies. Leaders: Marinus Willett, John Morin Scott
- Capture of Turtle Bay Depot on July 20, 1775, seized 600 muskets, gunpowder, and other supplies. Leaders: Marinus Willett, John Lamb, Isaac Sears, Alexander McDougall
- Raid on the New York Battery on August 23, 1775, seized 21 British cannons. Leaders: John Lamb, Alexander Hamilton

== New York Declaration ==
Just as the Liberty Boys were very active in opposing the Stamp Act, they were also active in supporting the Rights and Liberties of America. They helped support the New York Declaration, which was signed on May 26, 1775. The document was signed by 100 delegates from New York, with the goal of supporting the salvation of the Rights and Liberties of America It called for a republican form of government and moving away from Great Britain. It showed that many in New York State, despite having many Loyalists, wanted to move toward independence due to the arbitrary and oppressive acts of the British Parliament. Many of the Liberty Boys signed the New York Declaration, such as: Alexander McDougall, John Morin Scott, Isaac Sears, Issac Low, and Jacobus Van Zandt. The New York Declaration was signed a little over a year before the United States Declaration of Independence on July 4, 1776.

== Sons of Liberty ==
The Liberty Boys were very active in New York City before the war. Over time, most moved over to the broader group, the Sons of Liberty. The Liberty Boys were mostly active in stopping Stamp Act officers, sometimes by violence. But these actions made a fiction between the radical Liberty Boys and the more moderate Sons of Liberty and other conservative patriots. The New York Liberty Boys were mostly from the lower socioeconomic class, while the Sons of Liberty were from the upper, more educated class. While both strongly disliked the growth of British rule. Sons of Liberty used inter-colonial communication, committees, and newspaper propaganda to promote the patriot cause. The initial divide between the Sons of Liberty (the elites that denounced Liberty Boys violence) and the Liberty Boys (the lower class) occurred in November of 1765. Yet it was the Liberty Boys' violent action that ended the Stamp Act, not the Stamp Act Congress. With the Declaration of Independence, adopted by the Second Continental Congress on July 4, 1776, formally severed the thirteen American colonies from Great Britain and serving as a declaration of war, the divide between the Liberty Boys and Sons of Liberty disappeared, as they were now unity in one cause, Liberty. Alexander Hamilton was a Sons of Liberty moderate patriot. Isaac Low was a Sons of Liberty moderate patriot, and merchant, he later changed his mind and became a Loyalist after the Declaration of Independence. John Jay was a Sons of Liberty moderate patriot, an organized opposition the Intolerable Acts. William Livingston, while a Sons of Liberty moderate patriot, did support the Liberty Boys, but did not participate in the radical acts of the Liberty Boys. Alexander Hamilton was a moderate patriot and a member of the Sons of Liberty in New York.

== New York publishers ==
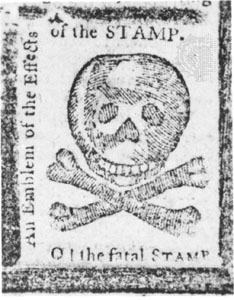
Colonial protest Stamp, to the Stamp Act of 1765

Newspapers and handbill printing were important to the Liberty Boys' ability to rally large crowds of patriots to support their cause. The Battle of Golden Hill started as a war over handbills. Most of the printing shops were located at Manhattan Hanover Square. Both Patriots (Liberty Boys and Sons of Liberty) and Loyalists/Torys used Newspapers, posters, and handbills to get their messaging out. There were only three Newspapers in New York City in the days of the Liberty Boys:

- 1) The New York Mercury and the New York Royal Gazette, remained neutral, published by Hugh Gaine, also printed the A Patriotic Advertisement in opposing the Stamp Act of 1765.
- 2) Rivington's Gazette, a Loyalists papper by James Rivington (printed from 1773 to 1783, with some breaks)
- 3) New-York Journal also published the General Advertiser (1766–1782), a Patriot paper by John Holt, called the “Liberty Printer”, which supported the American Patriots and was a source of information for those opposed to British policies. Started in New York City but, due to safety concerns, was forced to relocate around New York state. The New-York Journal and New York Gazette were disputed throughout the Thirteen colonies, as the New York Liberty Boys and Sons of Liberty were one of the most active Patriot groups.
  - New York Gazette and Weekly Post-Boy (1762–1766), a Patriot paper by John Holt and James Parker, during the period of the Stamp Act.
- April 23, 1775, after hearing about the Battles of Lexington and Concord, Sears and the Liberty Boys and other New York Patriots led an attack on the leader of a loyalist newspaper, James Rivington, who published a very pro-British rule paper, the Rivington's Gazette. The Rivington's Gazette shop was burned and looted. Rivington fled to England, but returned in 1776 and started a new paper. The paper became the Royal Gazette in 1776.
- On October 31, 1765, the day before the Stamp Act started, many printers published final newspapers with headings: "Mourning" or "Death" of Newspapers. These final newspapers were printed with black borders, some with skull-and-crossbones emblems, claiming the tax had killed the freedom of the press. Due to the extreme action of the Liberty Boys, the Stamp Act was never put into service.
- New York handbills and broadsides printers were an important part of opposing the Stamp Act, as well as other oppressive British policies. Patriot printers worked with both the Liberty Boys and Sons of Liberty on colonial news. Patriot printers published single-sheet broadsides (posters) and handbills, these were posted and read aloud to spread news of protest demonstrations, boycotts, resistance, and Patriot actions. Some of these printers in New York were: James Parker, John Holt, William Weyman.

== Alliances ==
The New York Liberty Boys not only promoted radical, at times violent, opposition to the Stamp Act of 1765 in New York but also sent delegations to other cities to promote their ideas and methods. Radical and violent protests in many cities were a key factor in the repeal of the Stamp Act. The New York Liberty Boys sent a delegation to Connecticut in December 1765. The delegation encouraged Connecticut patriots to join the Stamp Act resistance, and if needed, to use violence. On December 25, 1765, the New York Liberty Boys made an alliance with Connecticut patriots to resist the Stamp Act. In March 1766, Providence, Rhode Island had made an alliance, reciprocal, mutual agreement concession and association with New York Liberty Boys against the Stamp Act, by forces if needed. The New York and Connecticut Liberty Boys made military association in December 1765, and by which they pledged themselves to use armed force to prevent the execution of the Stamp Act. In October 1765, the New York Liberty Boys made an alliance with Baltimore, for colonial unity against the Stamp Act. The New York Liberty Boys made an alliance with New Haven Sons of Liberty, with Joseph Allicocke leading the alliance.

=== Liberty Boys in other cities ===
Other Liberty Boys groups formed at the same time in other cities in response to the Stamp Act of 1765, including:

- Annapolis, Maryland Liberty Boys with a Liberty Tree at St. John's College as its meeting spot. Key leaders: Samuel Chase and William Paca. British stamp distributor, Zachariah Hood, had an effigy of him hanged in Annapolis. Due to the Liberty Boys' threats and the destruction of his business, Hood then escaped to New York. The New York Liberty Boys found him, and he resigned as stamp distributor on November 28, 1765. The Liberty Boys and mob would not let the ships, and Captain John Brown, docked unload the Stamp Act stamps.
- Savannah, Georgia Liberty Boys had leaders like: Noble Wimberly Jones and Archibald Bulloch. The key meeting house was Tondee's Tavern. Savannah Liberty Boys tarryed and feathered loyalist Colonel Thomas Brown on August 2, 1775. Savannah Liberty Boys seizing gunpowder and erecting liberty poles.
- Charleston, South Carolina Liberty Boys key leader was Christopher Gadsden. Charleston Liberty Boys, boycott British goods, attacked tax collectors, and also tarred and feathered a few loyalists. The key meeting spot was at the Charleston Liberty Tree.
- North Carolina Liberty Boys forced Stamp tax collector, William Houston Sr., to resign on November 16, 1765. Liberty Boys had hung an effigy of him and threatened him. William Dry was forced to give an oath that he would not enforce the Stamp Act.
- Newport, Rhode Island Liberty Boys attacked Stamp Distributor, Martin Howard. On August 27th an effigy of Howard was burned, later he was attacked and fled to a British warship. Howard's house was attacked. Howard resigned as Stamp Distributor on August 29. Newport stamp distributor Augustus Johnson was also threatened and resigned.
- Albany, New York Liberty Boys held a meeting on January 4, 1766. At the meeting, they sought to identify residents seeking positions as Stamp tax collectors. Albany Liberty Boys and a mob of 400 went to Van Schaack, a potential stamp collector, and destroyed his house.
- New Haven, Connecticut Liberty Boys, burned an effigy of Stamp tax collector Jared Ingersoll. Ingersoll was threatened by the Liberty Boys and a mob, and he resigned. Ingersoll became a patriot in the 1780s he served in the Continental Congress, and in 1787 as a delegate to the Constitutional Convention. Stamp collector, Duncan Stewart, was forced to step down by the Liberty Boys.
- Williamsburg, Virginia, George Mercer resigned as tax collector in October 1765, after Liberty Boys and an angry mob protested his appointment as royal Stamp Collector. Mercer returned to the safety of England.
- Boston Liberty Boys leaders were known as the "Loyal Nine". They had decided that physical violence should be used to stop the use of the stamps. The Loyal Nine/Liberty Boys of Boston are best known and most quoted because of the Boston Stamp Act riots, Boston Massacre, Powder Alarm, Boston Tea Party, Paul Revere's Ride, and the Siege of Boston. The Loyal Nine protested the Stamp Act. A key meeting spot was the Boston Liberty Tree. The Loyal Nine/Liberty Boys of Boston later emerged into the Sons of Liberty. The Pillar of Liberty marker celabates the repeal of the Stamp Act. Stamp administer, Andrew Oliver, had a effigy of him hanged Boston's Liberty Tree On August 14, 1765. Then the Loyal Nine and a crowd had his house and offices ransacked. He resigned his stamp commission on August 17.
- By 1766, Liberty Boys in each of their cities were successfully forced almost all stamp collectors in the colonies to resign, leading to the repeal of the Stamp Act on March 18, 1766.

== New York King George III statue ==
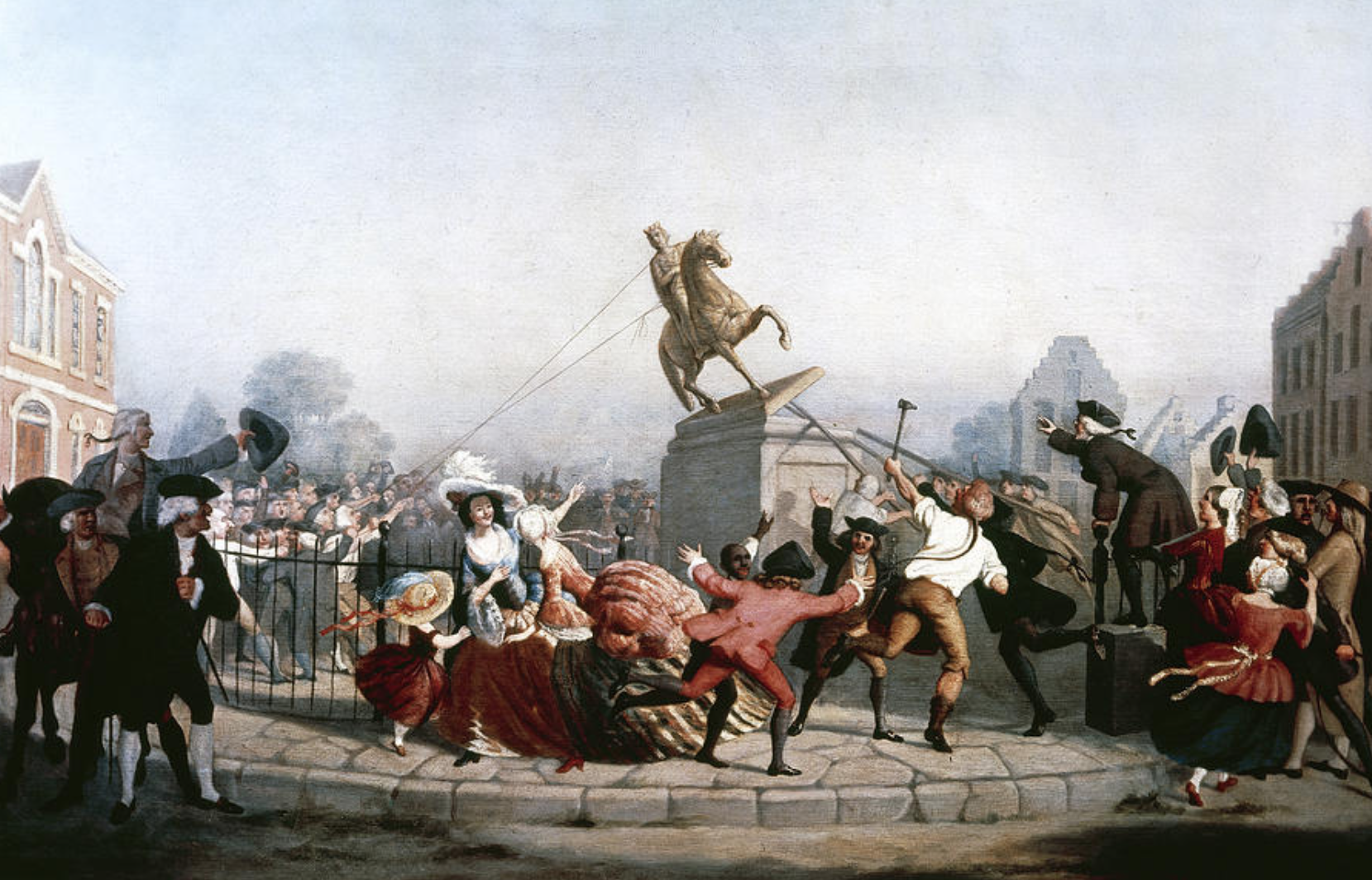
William Walcutt statue George III taken down on July 9, 1776 at Bowling Green

After the British Parliament repealed the Stamp Act on March 18, 1766, New York City installed a gold-leaf equestrian statue of King George III at Bowling Green at the request of the New York Assembly. The statue was built by London sculptor Joseph Wilton. The statue was erected in gratitude of the repeal of the Stamp Act. The site of the statue was very close to the location where the Liberty Boys burned the Fort George carriages and sleighs on November 1, 1765. On July 9, 1776, the Declaration of Independence was read aloud in New York City. That day, the Liberty Boys organized a mob that marched to Bowling Green Park and pulled down the statue, and broke it up. Later, the lead statue pieces were melted down and turned into 42,088 lead bullets for the Continental Army. Today, in Bowling Green Park, an iron fence remains, installed to protect the statue. The Horse’s tail and other small part from the equestrian statue of King George has survived and are at the New-York Historical Society.

The British military invaded Manhattan on September 15, 1776, and thus began the occupation of New York City. As the British military moved in about one-third of New York City's population, about 8,000 to 10,000 people, fled the city. The Liberty Boys and most Patriots departed and joined the war effort. The city became more of a military base than a multicultural city. New York served as a primary base for British operations during the war. New York City remained under British military control for seven years until they evacuated on November 25, 1783. On September 20, 1776, Great Fire of New York broke out and burnt up to 1,000 structures. Through the American Revolution War there was enough Patriots in New York City that George Washington was able to operate the Culpers Spy Ring in New York City. The New York City Hall that was raided on April 23, 1775 by the Liberty Boys, became Federal Hall, the United States' First capitol building and the meeting place of the First United States Congress.

== Cultural references ==
- New York: A Documentary Film, 17½ hour, American documentary film, 2003
- Liberty! six-hour documentary miniseries, 1997
- The Patriot, 2000 film
- Sons of Liberty, 2015 miniseries
- Sons of Liberty, 1939 film
- List of television series and miniseries about the American Revolution

== See also ==
- John Peter Zenger
- New York and New Jersey campaigns (1776–1777)
- Boston campaign
- Edenton Tea Party
- List of American Revolutionary War battles
