= Sons of Neptune =

Dissident organization during the American Revolution

- The Rebellious Stripes Flag
- Other name: Free Sons of New York and Vox Populi
- Leaders: John Lamb, John Morin Scott and Isaac Sears
- Dates active: 1765–1776
- Active regions: Province of New York
- Ideology: Radical Patriots; Initial phase: "No taxation without representation" Rights of Englishmen
- Status: Merged into Sons of Liberty and Liberty Boys
- Part of: Radical branch of Sons of Liberty

The Sons of Neptune was a group of colonial sailors directly associated with and on whom the Liberty Boys may have been based. They were active before and during the American Revolution. Among those affiliated with the Sons of Neptune are John Lamb, John Morin Scott and Isaac Sears. John Lamb, John Morin Scott, and Isaac Sears also used the title Free Sons of New York and Vox Populi, Latin phrase meaning "voice of the people". The Sons of Neptune began to defend themselves against trade restrictions imposed by the British. They were involved in the Stamp Act Crisis, the Townsend Acts, and the New York Tea Party.
