= Joseph Allicocke =

18th century American colonist

Joseph Allicocke (alternatively Joseph Allicock or Allicoke) was an American colonist possibly of mixed African and European descent, and an early leader of the Liberty Boys and Sons of Liberty during the protests against the Stamp Act of 1765.

== Biography ==
Allicocke's origins are uncertain. Some records say that he was the son of an Antiguan, likely Captain Syer Allicocke, though in later life he himself claimed to hail from Ireland. Most interesting is the record of Capt. John Montresor, who, in his journals from the 1760s, noted Allicocke to be 'son of a mulatto woman'. It remains unclear whether this was an unfounded rumor being repeated by Montresor, his own spurious assumption – perhaps based on Allicocke's Antiguan origins – or in fact true and simple common knowledge no one else felt worth writing down. Likely being born in Antigua, he was sent from there to Philadelphia for schooling, and certainly, he was living and working in New York City as a clerk and merchant by the early 1760s, where he became involved with the New York Liberty Boys in 1765, and quickly rose to a leadership position alongside John Lamb and Isaac Sears. There, he participated in negotiations with the New Haven Sons of Liberty. With the success of the protests and the overturning of the Stamp Act in 1766, Allicocke was honored with a 21 gun salute and the honorific titling of "general of the Sons of Liberty."

In 1774, he accepted the position of Secretary for the New York Committee of Correspondence, but voluntarily resigned from the position soon after. He continued to do business with British military agents through 1775 which caused charges to be brought against him. Although acquitted, the Congress finding that "[h]e had supplied such Provisions inadvertently, and without any design to injure the Country", he nevertheless was briefly forced to flee the city to Antigua in early 1776. A year later, however, he had returned to now British-occupied New York City, where he served as with the Chamber of Commerce and as Secretary of the United Whaling Co., and identified as a Loyalist.

The reasons for Allicocke's Loyalist allegiance remain shrouded. Donald A. Grinde, Jr., in his work on Allicocke, believed Montresor's description of partial African ancestry to be genuine and thus sees the possibility that Allicocke's choice was in part driven by racial views and the belief that the British offered a better future for him as a black man. J.S. Tiedmann, however, more cautious about accepting Montresor's claim as fact, points to Allicocke's increasing social standing through the 1760s, and connections with the powerful De Lancey family which may have helped distance him from the politics of his Liberty Boy days. Regardless of the true cause, by the time of the British evacuation of New York City on November 25, 1783, Allicocke had left the city.

=== Later years ===
Following his flight from the newly created United States, Allicocke headed for England, setting himself up as a wine merchant in London by 1785.

On July 8, 1811, his wife Martha died and was buried in Southampton, England. On March 7, 1815, he died and was buried beside her.

== Family ==
Allicocke married Martha Jardine on January 31, 1760. She was the daughter of Charles Jardine, a New Yorker of Huguenot ancestry. Her sister Catherine had previously married John Lamb, later one of Allicocke's co-leaders in the Sons of Liberty, in 1755. They had a large family of ten children, which Allicocke would describe as "expensive". His son Charles John served as a lieutenant of cavalry with the South Carolina Royalists during the war.
