= Battle of Golden Hill =

1770 skirmish between British soldiers and American colonists

Coordinates: 40.708667°N 74.005944°W

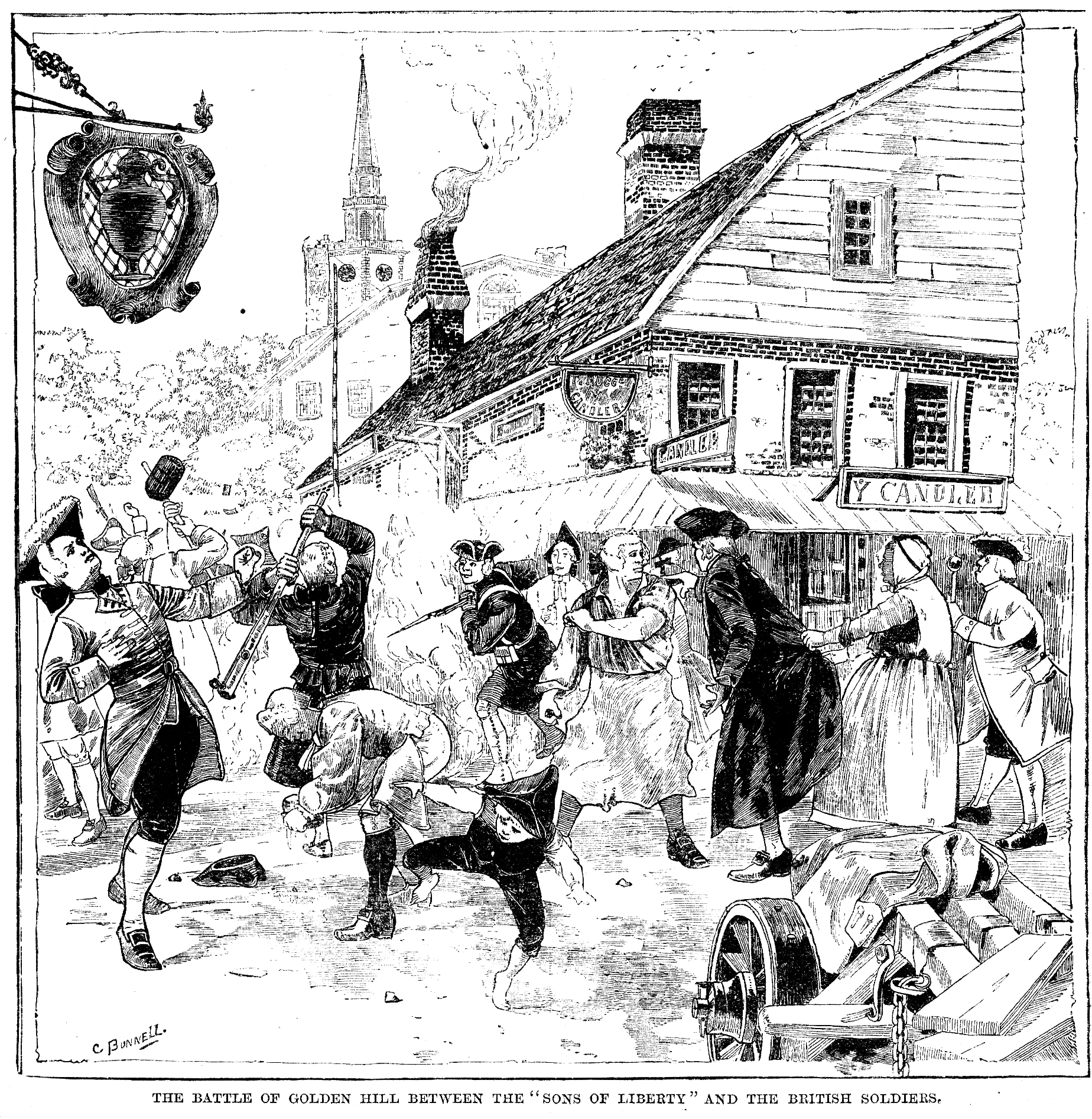
Print from 1884 commemorating the Battle of Golden Hill

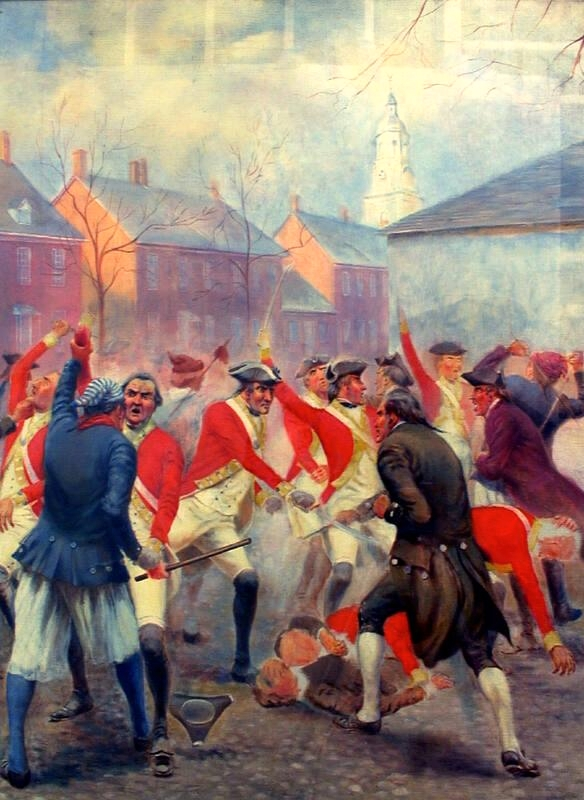
Battle of Golden Hill, by Charles M. Lefferts, circa 1919–1920

The Battle of Golden Hill was a clash between British soldiers and the Liberty Boys in the American colonies that occurred on January 19, 1770, in New York City. Along with the Boston Massacre and the Gaspee affair, the event was one of the early violent incidents in what would become the American Revolution.

== Background ==
During the imperial crisis with Britain in the 1760s, the Sons of Liberty (or "Liberty Boys") in New York City sometimes erected "Liberty poles" to symbolize their displeasure with British authorities. The first such pole was put up in City Hall Park on May 21, 1766, in celebration of the repeal of the 1765 Stamp Act. The British chopped it down in August in protest of the fact that the New York government had refused to enforce the Stamp Act. Another pole was put up which was quickly cut down. A third pole was put up which stayed up until 1767, when British soldiers cut it down after seeing colonists celebrating the anniversary of the repeal of the Stamp Act. A fourth was put up, this time secured with iron bands. In 1767, the Quartering Act was passed which the New York government mostly left unenforced. Parliament reacted to this by dissolving the assembly and replacing it with one that did agree. The Sons of Liberty posted a broadside called “To the Betrayed Inhabitants of the City and Colony of New York” in response. The British blew up this liberty pole on January 16 because of the broadside and as a result of the fact soldiers were given 1800 pounds for supporting the act. They left the remains of the pole on the door of a tavern owner named Mr. Montanye. The "red coats" also posted their own handbills which attacked the Sons of Liberty as "the real enemies of society" who "thought their freedom depended on a piece of wood".

== Event ==
On January 19, 1770, six weeks before the Boston Massacre, Isaac Sears and others tried to stop some soldiers from posting handbills at the Fly Market at the foot of Maiden Lane. Sears captured some of the soldiers and marched his captives towards the mayor's office, while the rest of the British soldiers ran to the barracks to sound the alarm. A crowd of townsfolk arrived along with a score of soldiers. The soldiers were surrounded and badly outnumbered. Fellow soldiers tried to rescue them but were ordered to their barracks. As they were being escorted to their barracks, they reached John Street between William Street and Pearl Street. This area was known as "Golden Hill", after a nearby wheat field.

An officer then said, “Soldiers, draw your bayonets and cut your way through them." More soldiers arrived and a group of officers arrived to disperse the soldiers before the situation got completely out of hand. Several of the soldiers were badly bruised and one had a serious wound. Some of the townsfolk were wounded and according to some sources, there was one death, though this is disputed.

== Effects ==
Although several people were wounded in the event, sources differ on whether any fatalities occurred. Historian Robert Middlekauff states that someone was killed while some primary sources indicate only wounded casualties. It also made Alexander McDougall famous in the area and later a general in the Continental Army. After the battle, the last Liberty Pole was raised on February 6, 1770. Though the event was not as famous as the Boston Massacre, it was remembered in 1898 with a plaque on the site of the battle, in current day Eden's Alley. However, the building was demolished and the plaque disappeared.
