= Tondee's Tavern =

Coordinates: 32°04′46″N 81°05′35″W

Tondee's Tavern was a tavern located in Savannah, Georgia, during the 1700s. It was the site of Patriot activity during the American Revolution, as well as the first meeting place of the new state government.

== Tavern ==
Tondee's Tavern (also known as Tondee's Long House or Tondee's Long Room) was located at the northwest corner of Broughton and Whitaker Streets. It was built between 1766 and 1770 by Peter Tondee, who operated the business with his wife, Lucy Tondee. No contemporary illustrations are known to exist, but a physical description in the annals of Georgia describe a long room and a porch.

The tavern was popular with local social clubs as well as sea captains. It was the largest public building in Savannah, Georgia, at the time and hosted a large number of social clubs and events, such as the Mason and Union Society. It is possible that the second floor of the tavern served as a theater for local amateur performances.

The tavern was destroyed in 1796 by a fire that destroyed two-thirds of Savannah.

== Revolutionary War activity ==
Tondee's Tavern was the site of organized political activity in Georgia during the American Revolution. The Georgia Sons of Liberty, or "Liberty Boys," began meeting at Tondee's Tavern on July 27, 1774, to discuss the Intolerable Acts and revolutionary activity in the northern colonies. On December 14, 1774, elections were held to select delegates to a state Provincial Congress. Among the notable delegates were Peter Tondee, Joseph Habersham, Archibald Bulloch, John Houstoun, and Joseph Clay.

On January 12, 1775, a meeting was held to write a petition to George III, and on May 10, 1775, a meeting was held to declare independence. A liberty pole was built in front of Tondee's Tavern on June 5, 1775. On June 21, 1775, city residents met to elect a council of safety to communicate with the First Continental Congress. The First Provincial Congress of Georgia met at Tondee's Tavern beginning July 4, 1775. This government endorsed the actions of the First Continental Congress and selected delegates to the Second Continental Congress.

Beginning in December 1775, the council of safety scheduled meetings each Monday morning. By this time, Peter Tondee had died and his wife, Lucy, was operating the tavern.

On August 10, 1776, Archibald Bulloch, president of the Georgia Provincial Congress, read the Declaration of Independence from the front porch of the tavern.

During the British occupation of Savannah (1778–1782), the tavern was under the control of the British. On August 5, 1782, the Patriot government reestablished government operations from the tavern, where they remained until 1784.

== Peter and Lucy Tondee ==
Peter Tondee was born about 1723 in London, England. He traveled with his father, Peter Sr., and brother, Charles, to Savannah at the age of 10. Peter was a member of the Saint Andrew's Society, organized in Savannah in 1750. This membership indicates that he was of Scottish heritage. When their father died shortly after arrival in Georgia, Peter and Charles were taken in as orphans at Bethesda Academy, where Peter was trained as a carpenter. He helped build various important structures in Savannah, including Christ Church and the building that would serve as the city courthouse, as well as his tavern.

Peter was a member of the Sons of Liberty and took part in Patriot political activity hosted at his tavern, and was the "door keeper" during the Sons of Liberty meeting on 10 August 1774. He is recognized by the DAR as a Revolutionary War Patriot for his actions during the war.

Lucy Mouse Tondee was born about 1733 and died on September 22, 1785, in Savannah, Georgia. Lucy took over ownership and operations of the tavern when Peter died in October 1775. She was paid £15 by the state government for the use of the tavern. For her continued support of the revolutionary state government, she is recognized by the DAR as a Revolutionary War Patriot. Lucy and her children received weekly provisions from the state in 1782, including beef, bread, and salt.

Peter and Lucy Tondee were enslavers. In 1759 records show two enslaved people in his household. He was taxed for a slave in 1768, and the Tondee estate reflects the sale of an enslaved man, Will, and woman, Cumba, and her child.

== Historical recognition ==
A historical marker is located at 102 Broughton Street in Savannah, Georgia, which marks the historic location of Tondee's Tavern. The plaque was placed in 1899 by the Georgia Society of the Colonial Dames of America.

The Georgia State Society of the Daughters of the American Revolution maintains a historical period room at the NSDAR's Memorial Continental Hall that interprets the interior of Tondee's Tavern.
