= Isaac Sears =

American politician

Isaac Sears (July 1, 1730 – October 28, 1786) was an American merchant, sailor, Freemason, and political figure who played an important role in the American Revolution, as a leader of the Liberty Boys.

He was born July 1, 1730, at West Brewster, Massachusetts, the son of Joshua and Mary Sears. He was a descendant of Richard Sears, who emigrated to the colonies from Colchester, England, in 1630. While he was a child, the family moved to Norwalk, Connecticut.

At the age of sixteen, he was apprenticed to the skipper of a coastal vessel. By 1752, he was in command of a sloop trading between New York and Canada. Sears established his reputation as a privateer during the French and Indian War, commanding a vessel from 1758 until 1761, when he lost his ship. He moved to New York City and had become successful enough to become a merchant investing in ships engaging in trade with the West Indies.

== Early life ==
Born in July 1730 in West Brewster, Barnstable Massachusetts Bay Colony, the son of Joshua and Mary (Thacher) Sears. Isaac Sears was the sixth of nine children. He was a fifth generation of New Englander whose family left Cape Cod and settled in Norwalk, Connecticut. He had well established religious ties, as he also had ancestors who were a Deacon and a Minister in the Congregational Church. He was baptized in the church in 1730, and became a member of the Congregation in Harwich, Massachusetts.

He became an Anglican and married Sarah Drake at Trinity Church in New York City. He raised his family in Manhattan. His father-in-law was Jasper Drake, who owned the Water Street Tavern.

As a young boy, he sold shellfish, and by age 16 begn apprenticing with the Captain of a New England coastal vessel.

== Career ==
After learning the trade, he was commissioned as an officer. By his 20s, he commanded small sloops that sailed the North American coast between Halifax and New York. He sailed as far as the West Indies. By 1752, he was commanding a sloop, which transported goods trading between New York and Canada. During the Seven Years' War, he was a Captain of privateers and commanded The Decoy a six gun sloop, The Catherine, and The Belle Isle which had fourteen guns. Sears established a reputation during the French and Indian War and became Captain of several privateers. He was commissioned to prey on enemy ships from 1758 until 1761, when he ultimately lost his ship. He moved to New York City and became a merchant investor in ships, engaging in trade with the West Indies.

By 1763, he underwent a career change in which he moved on from captaining ships, to settle as a merchant. He started first in vessels but the Sugar Act 1764 affected his trade along the North American coast, and West Indies and ultimately forced him to stop trade with Madeira.

=== Sons of Liberty ===
Sears and his fellow Liberty Boys all gathered at a coffee house on October 31, 1765, the day before the Stamp Act was to take effect. They ultimately resolved to enforce the opposition to the distribution of the stamps and formed an association to stop the importation of British goods until the act was rescinded. Sears organized and was a known leader of the Sons of Liberty in 1765. They used violence and threats of violence to prevent the use of stamps, moreover, Sears issued a death threat to anyone breaking the non-importation agreement before the colonies agreed to do so. He was nicknamed "King Sears" by aristocrats who feared his power to mobilize people in the streets and for his influential role in organizing and leading the New York mob. He was a militant and influential agitator and earned a reputation for bravery and sought to limit the scope of Britain's authority in 1760. Another nickname that was bestowed upon him by British military engineer and cartographer John Montresor, was the “Spawn of Liberty and Inquisition” which Montresor both passionately and derisively called him and his posse of vigilantes. British Vice Admiral Samuel Graves lists Sears as the “most active leaders and agitators of the rebellion.

He was at the head of nearly every demonstration of mob violence in New York City. He partnered with James DeLancey in opposition to the stamps and supported him in his 1768 election to the New York assembly. Sears and many of his followers were engaged in trade and demanded that trade continue without stamps.

In 1766, Sears, John Lamb and three others formed a committee of correspondence to communicate with other Sons of Liberty groups in other provinces. After the Stamp Act was repealed the Sons of Liberty erected a Liberty pole to celebrate. The liberty pole was a galling sight to the redcoats and a symbol of pride and defiance to the townsfolk. When the British cut down the pole for the first time, Sears and Walter Quackenbos collared two redcoats posting broadsides, a fellow soldier drew his bayonet and threatened them, Sears had a rams horn in his hand and threw it at him and hit him in the head. In 1768, he and numerous New York merchants sent a petition to Parliament outlining their grievances on the state of trade. In 1769, when the New York assembly passed an appropriation for funding of the Quartering Act, he posted an inflammatory broadside entitled "To the betrayed inhabitants of the city and colony of New York".

On January 19, 1770, the Battle of Golden Hill began when Sears took it upon himself to prevent a half dozen redcoats from posting broadsides at an outdoor market near the East River wharves, Sears seized the soldier fixing the paper by the collar and asked him what business he had to put up Libels against the inhabitants and carried him to the mayor. The fifth liberty pole was raised on February 6, 1770 on a plot of land owned by Sears. When the Tea Act was passed in 1773, he organized the city's captains into refusing to freight the East Indian tea. It was the first organized opposition to the tax. Broadsides, signed "The Mohawks", were posted warning against anyone trying to land tea. New York's opposition was partly responsible for Boston's decision to stop the landing of tea. Adams wrote, "we must venture, and unless we do, we shall be discarded by the sons of liberty in the other colonies". They were successful in preventing the landing of tea. In April 1774, they boarded the Nancy and destroyed its tea.

During the Townsend Acts, Britain passed a Tea Act in 1773 to ship tea directly to North America to help the East India Company, saving it from being taxed so it can come out of bankruptcy. Sears and his companions believed that the ruin of their commerce was inevitable if they did not succeed in preventing the sale of India Company tea in America. They were convinced that this could only be effected by total prohibition of English tea, since the Company would find ways of importing its tea to America by way of private merchants regardless. He was also worried Britain would soon try to make a monopoly of other goods in the colonies, threatening the welfare of the Sons of Neptune. Before the tea was to be sent to the colonies, Captain Sears and McDougall decided an opposition was needed and sought to unite all the Sons of Neptune and Liberty with the merchants and tea-smugglers. The Sons of Liberty and the Dutch smugglers had come together and sparked the "New Flame" described by William Smith. As the tea approached the harbors of New York, Philadelphia, and Boston in early November the campaign began. The tea stood in the boats that were in the harbor and no one dared to remove them for fear of the tea being destroyed. Towards the end of November, McDougall from Sons of Liberty made a publication to be sent out to all harbors. "If any of the tea by any persons associated with the India Tea Company had accepted a commission to sell, land, or store the tea would be paid "an unwelcomed visit, in which they shall be treated as they deserve: by 'The Mohawks.'" Thus Sears and McDougall initiated the use of this distinctively American name to cover the identity of those who were ready to employ violence to block the operation of the Tea Act." Not long after, the Boston Tea Party took place and the tea ships in Philadelphia and New York turned back to England for fear of their cargo.

When in May 1774 news of the Boston Port Act arrived, Sears and McDougall wrote a letter of support to Boston, without consulting anyone else, in addition to a British boycott, they proposed a ban on exports to the West Indies and called for a Continental Congress. Reaction in New York to the Boston Port Act was cautious and equivocal, there was a split with the DeLanceys on whether to proceed with nonimportantion.

=== Committee of Sixty ===
On May 16, 1774, a meeting at the Fraunces Tavern was called of the various factions. The Committee of Fifty was elected with Isaac Low as its chairman. James DeLancey's faction was in the majority, with Sears and his Sons of Liberty in the minority.

In 1774, he was a leading member of New York City's Committee of Sixty. In a letter to the Boston Committee of Correspondence he proposed a meeting of delegates from the principal towns. This proposal was initially disavowed by the Committee of Sixty, but later was ratified in a proposal for the meeting of the First Continental Congress.

=== American Revolutionary War ===
On April 15, 1775, he was arrested for his anti-British activities, but was rescued at the prison door by his supporters and paraded through the streets as a hero. When news of the Battle of Lexington arrived, he and his followers seized the arsenal at the Custom House on April 23, 1775. He was the de facto commander of New York City until Washington's Army arrived in June, 1776.

On November 20, 1775, Sears led a group of 80 citizens in apprehending Parson Seabury, Judge Fowler, and Lord Underhill. At some point the mob forced Fowler to write (or else they forged his name) an apology and a promise not to interfere with the Second Continental Congress. While some of the mob escorted the three prisoners to Connecticut, ·November 23, 1775, Sears and his men rode into New York at high noon with bayonets fixed and shut down James Rivington's Gazetteer by taking all of the type from his office at the foot of Wall Street where a large crowd gathered outside the Merchants coffee shop to cheer the raiders as they marched out of town to the tune of Yankee Doodle. However, this action was condemned by the Committee of Sixty, the New York Provincial Congress and the New York delegation to the Continental Congress, but public opinion was with him and no action and after the capture of New York, Sears returned to Massachusetts, where he grew rich by privateering and spending time at sea as a privateer from Boston from 1777 to 1783. He formed partnerships with other privateers, such as John Kendrick, with whom he owned in partnership the vessel Count d'Estaing, commanded by Kendrick.

=== Post-war years ===
After the British left New York City in 1783, he returned to the city installing himself in a mansion on the Bowling Green and reviving the Sons of Liberty. By March, he was calling for the expulsion of any remaining Loyalists in the state by May 1. He and other members of the Sons of Liberty won enough seats in the New York State Assembly in December, 1784 to enact a set of harsh anti-Loyalist laws. He was exposed for buying up soldier's payzari certificates at depressed prices and using them to speculate in forfeited Loyalist property. The public regarded this as the height of venality and cynicism. He was again elected to the assembly in 1786, but by then he was deeply in debt and he left the state to avoid arrest.

== Death ==
Sears died on October 28, 1786, from fever and dysentery contracted in Batavia in the Dutch East Indies while on a great adventure to open American trade with China.

He was buried on an island in Canton Harbor.
