= William Weyman =

American printer

William Weyman (died July 27, 1768) was a colonial American printer.

Weyman was born in Philadelphia, a son of Reverend Robert Weyman. His father died in 1737, survived by his wife, and six children including William. Weyman apprenticed to printer William Bradford.

In 1753, Weyman joined James Parker's printer business in New York, and in publishing The New-York Gazette, or the Weekly Post Boy, and remained in partnership with Parker until 1759. Parker and Weyman served as the government printer for New York. After their partnership severed in 1759, Weyman published his own paper as the New-York Gazette until 1767.

As government printer in 1766, Weyman printed an address with so many mistakes that he was forced to appear before the House to admit to his misdeed, apologize, and promise to perform better.

Weyman died in New York on July 27, 1768. The New York Mercury wrote upon his death: "Died at his house in this city, of a lingering illness, which had for some time rendered him incapable of business, Mr. William Weyman, for many years past a printer of note."
