= Liberty Tree (Charleston) =

Charleston's Liberty Tree was the meeting place for the city's sect of the Sons of Liberty, an organization that advocated for the American Revolution. The oak tree was utilized from the late 1760s until 1780, when it was burned down by British troops following the Siege of Charleston. It was the site where news of the United States Declaration of Independence was announced to Charleston citizens in 1776.

The oak tree, at the time located in a cow pasture, was chosen by William Johnson Sr., father of future Supreme Court Justice, William Johnson, Jr., as a meeting place. It was where Christopher Gadsden, who is considered "Charleston's Sam Adams", advocated for American independence.

Johnson made cane heads out of the tree's roots following the Revolution and gave one to Thomas Jefferson. In 1905, a historical marker was placed near the tree's former location on Alexander Street.
