= Liberty pole =

Tall wooden pole surmounted by a Phrygian cap

A Liberty cap topping a Liberty pole

A liberty pole is a wooden pole, or sometimes spear or lance, surmounted by a "cap of liberty", mostly of the Phrygian cap. The symbol originated in the immediate aftermath of the assassination of the Roman dictator Julius Caesar by a group of Rome's Senators in 44 BCE. Immediately after Caesar was killed the assassins, or Liberatores as they called themselves, went through the streets with their bloody weapons held up, one carrying a pileus (a kind of skullcap that identified a freed slave, not in fact a Phrygian cap) carried on the tip of a spear. This symbolized that the Roman people had been freed from the rule of Caesar, which the assassins claimed had become a tyranny because it overstepped the authority of the Senate and thus betrayed the Republic.

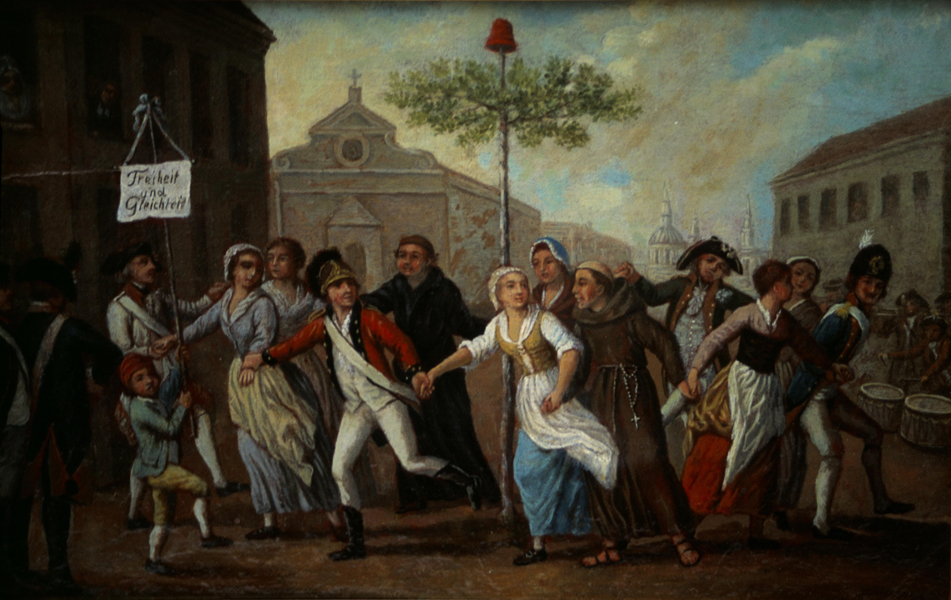
Germans dancing round a Tree of Liberty/Liberty Pole, 1792–1795.

The liberty pole was not thereafter part of the normal Roman depiction of Libertas, the Roman goddess of liberty, who is very often shown holding out a pileus, and carrying a pole or rod. Both refer to the ceremony granting freeman status to a slave, where the subject was touched with the rod, and given the hat. But the hat raised on the end of the pole was shown as an attribute held by Libertas on some coins of the emperor Antoninus Pius, which was enough, with the literary references, to bring it to the attention of Renaissance antiquarians. The pileus itself was shown between two daggers, with the inscription "Ides of March", on some very famous coins made by the assassins of Julius Caesar in the civil war following the assassination.

After the Renaissance, the liberty pole became a common element in the depiction of liberty, initially in a small version carried by personifications, and also later as a larger actual physical object planted in the ground, used as a type of flagstaff.

== Revival from the Renaissance onwards ==
When the motif was revived during the 16th century it was mostly carried by national or political personifications. Its first appearance as an attribute of Liberty in an Italian emblem book was in 1556, later followed by many others. In his "Apotheosis of Venice" (1585) in the Doge's Palace, Paolo Veronese has the ascendant Republic of Venice (personified as a woman) flanked by several symbolic persons, one of whom represents Liberty, dressed as a peasant hoisting a red Phrygian cap on a spear.

The Dutch Maiden, national personification of the Dutch United Provinces fighting to escape from Spanish rule, often carries a hat on a pole. In these cases, the hat is the normal contemporary respectable man's hat, usually with a broad and stiff brim. With considerable cheek, Louis XIV of France had a medal cast in 1678, after the Treaty of Nijmegen ended the war started by his invasion of the Netherlands; this showed the Maiden "standing beside Peace, and receiving the instructions of Prudence".

The imagery was introduced to Britain, partly by the Dutch William III of England, who in one medal presents a cap of liberty to the kneeling England, Scotland and Ireland. When Britannia was pictured as "British Liberty", she usually exchanged the trident she normally carried for a liberty pole. An example of this is a large monument, originally called the "Column of British Liberty", now usually just the "Column to Liberty", begun in the 1750s on his Gibside estate outside Newcastle-on-Tyne by the hugely wealthy Sir George Bowes, reflecting his Whig politics. Set at the top of a steep hillock, the monument itself is taller than Nelson's Column in London, and topped by a bronze female figure, originally gilded, carrying a cap of liberty on a pole.

During the 18th century, the Roman pileus was confused with the Phrygian cap, and this mis-identification then led to the Phrygian cap, familiar from other uses in Roman sculpture, becoming the standard shape when a cap of liberty was used as a political symbol.

Liberty poles carried by personifications

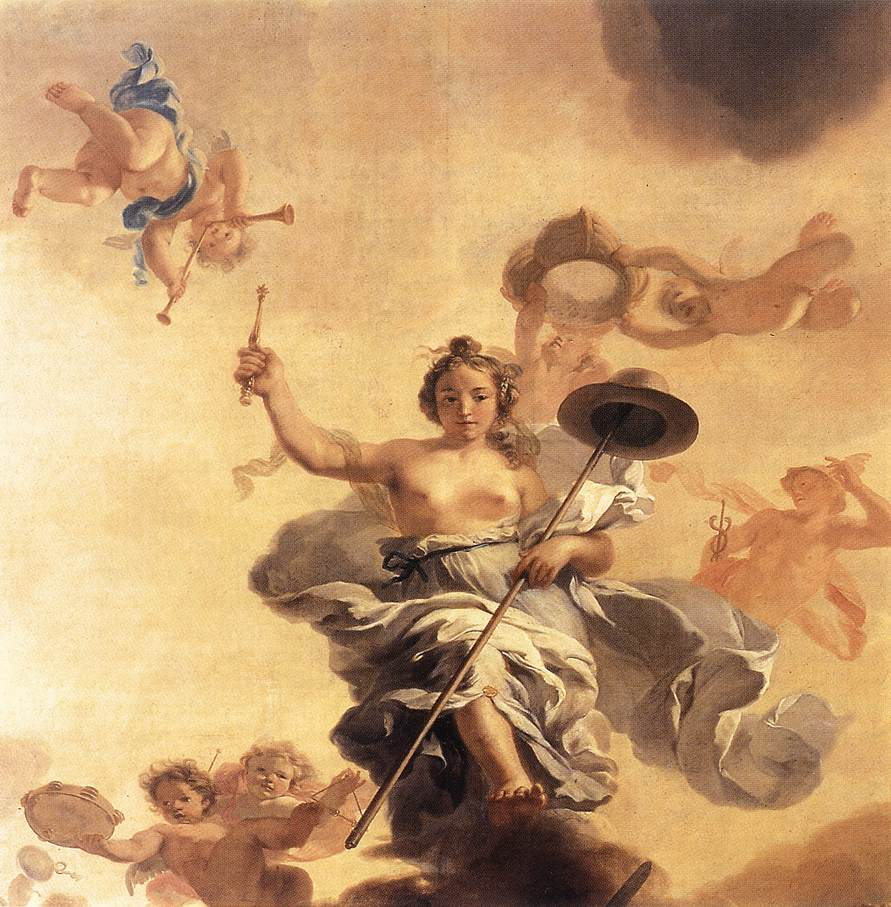
Gérard de Lairesse, the Dutch Maiden in his Allegory of the Freedom of Trade (glorify the De Graeff family’ as the protector of the Republican state), 1672

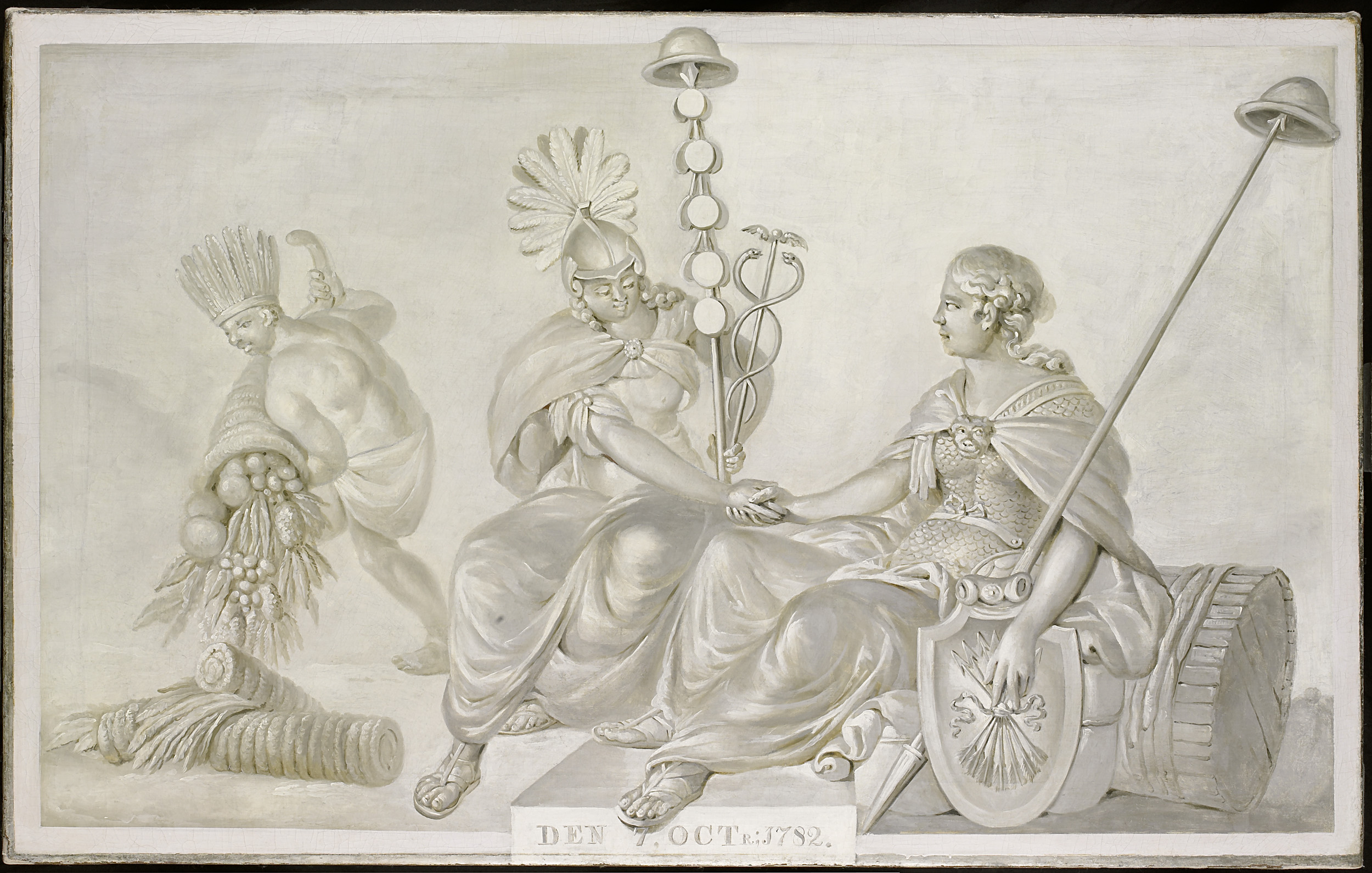
Dutch allegory for the Netherlands/US trade treaty, 1782. Personification of the Americas, left, "Indian princess" and classical hybrid for the US centre, Dutch Maiden right.

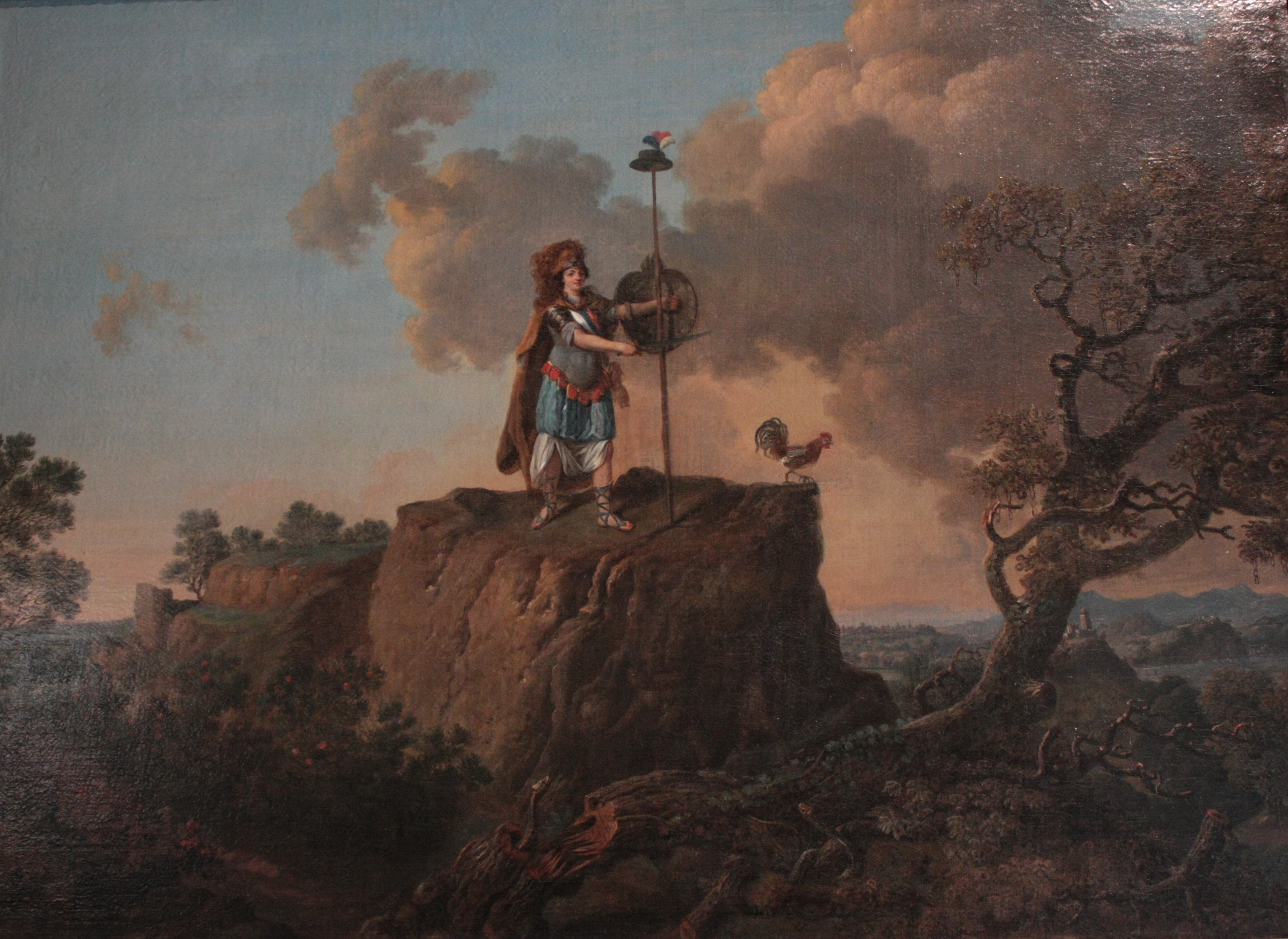
French painting of the Triumph of Liberty, c. 1790. The cap is a contemporary man's hat. The Gallic cock accompanies Liberty.

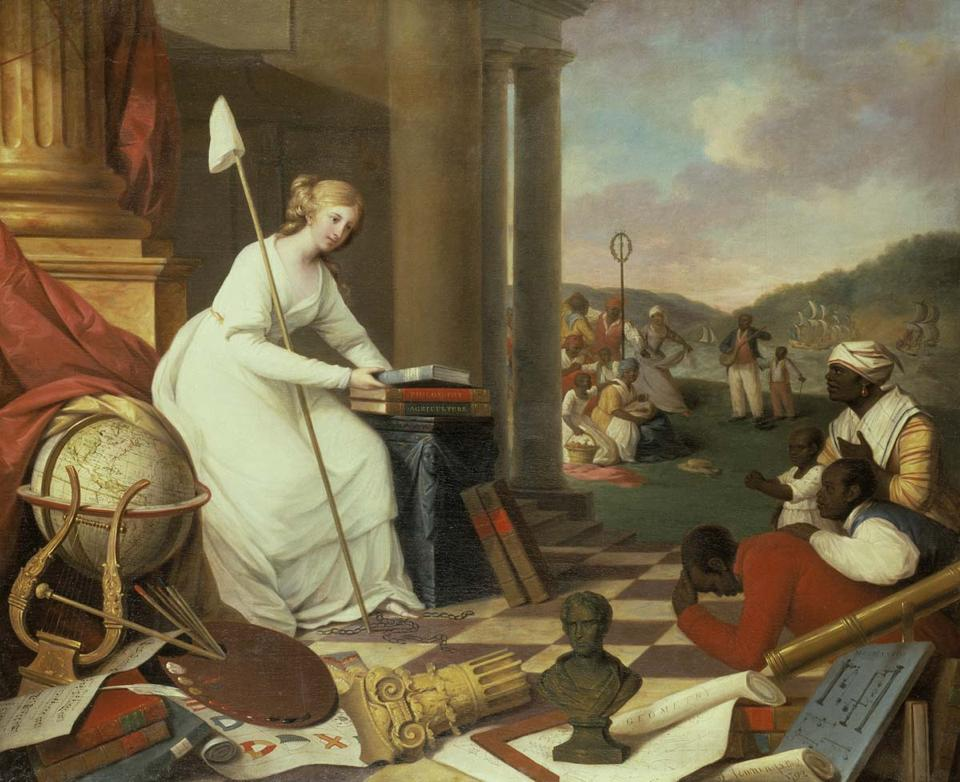
Liberty Displaying the Arts and Sciences, or The Genius of America Encouraging the Emancipation of the Blacks, 1792, Samuel Jennings. A liberty tree is outside.

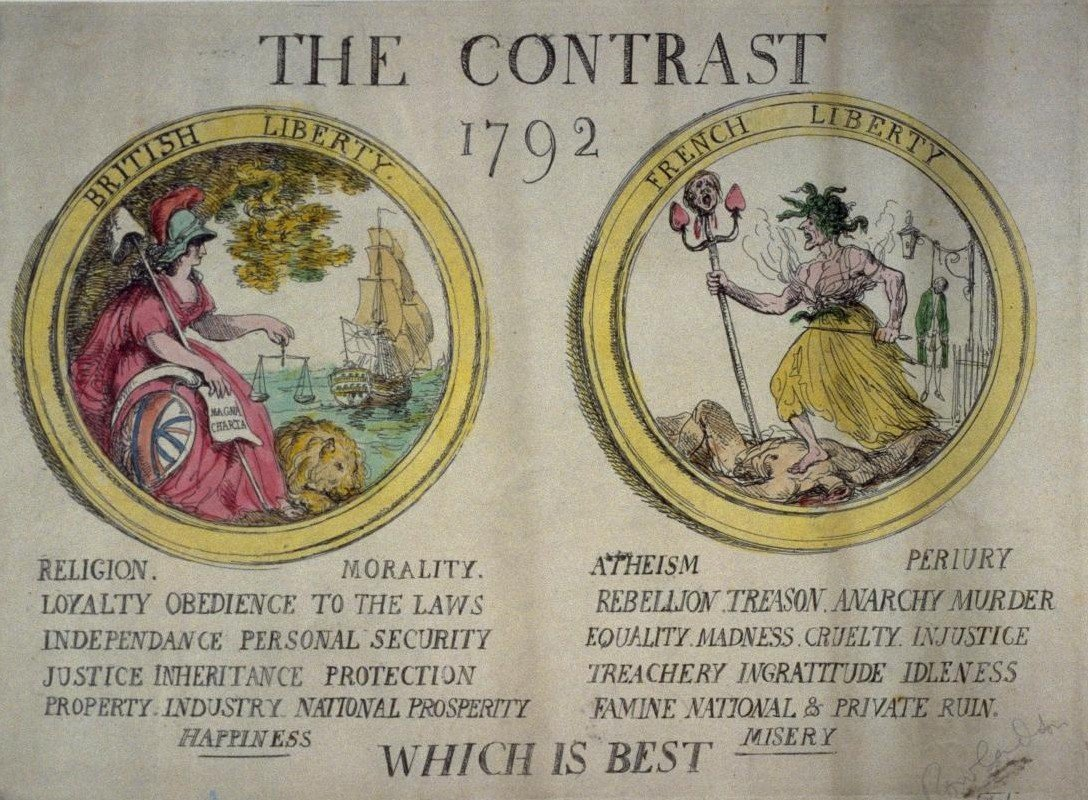
"British Liberty" in The Contrast: 1792: Which Is Best, by Thomas Rowlandson. Anti-French cartoon.

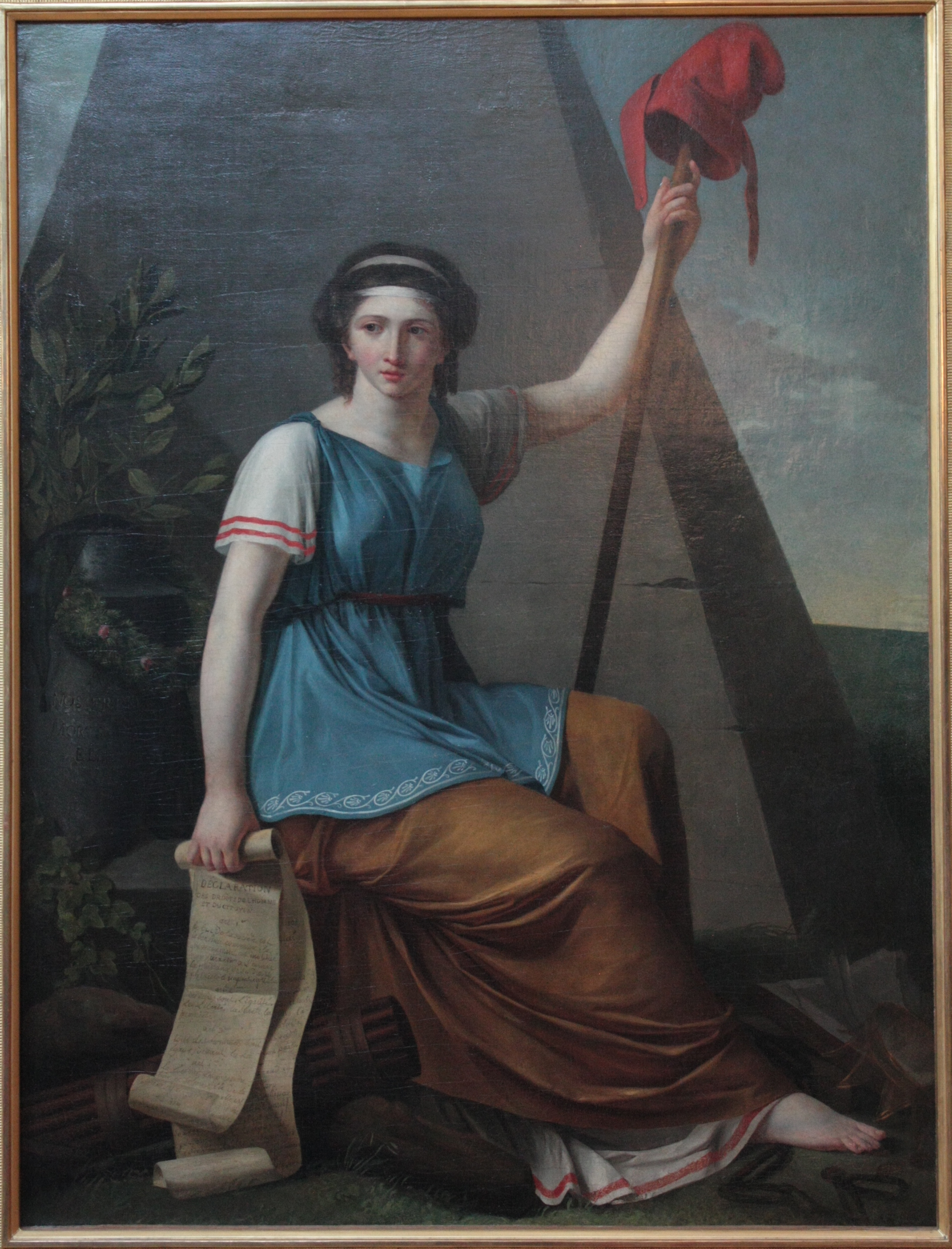
Nanine Vallain, Liberté, 1794

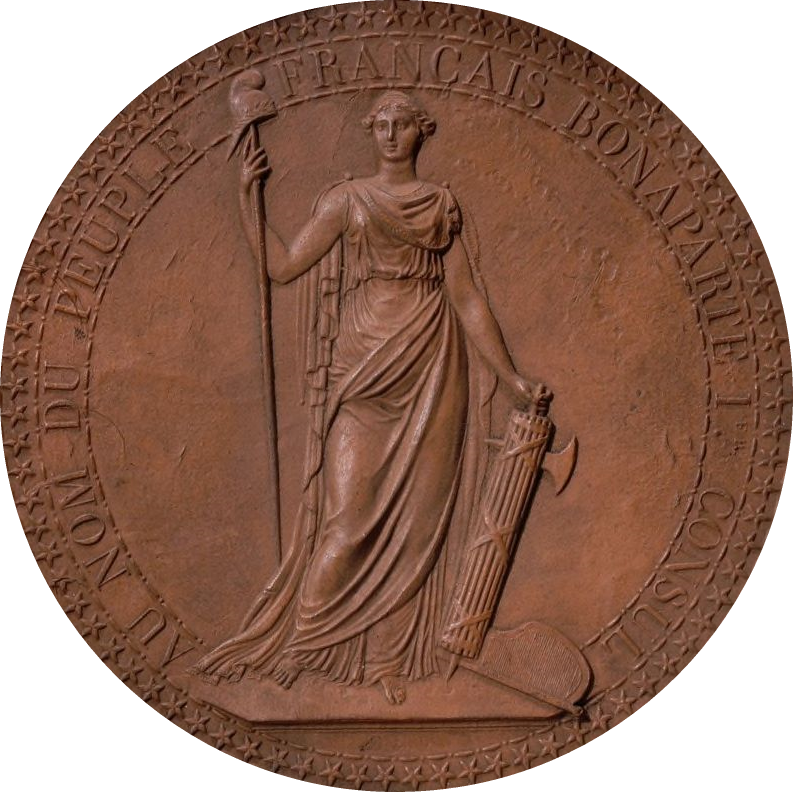
French Consulate Seal of Napoleon Bonaparte, 1799

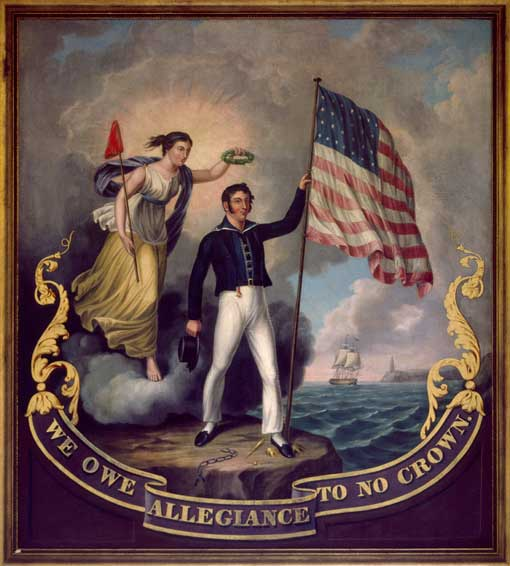
John Archibald Woodside, We Owe Allegiance To No Crown, 1814

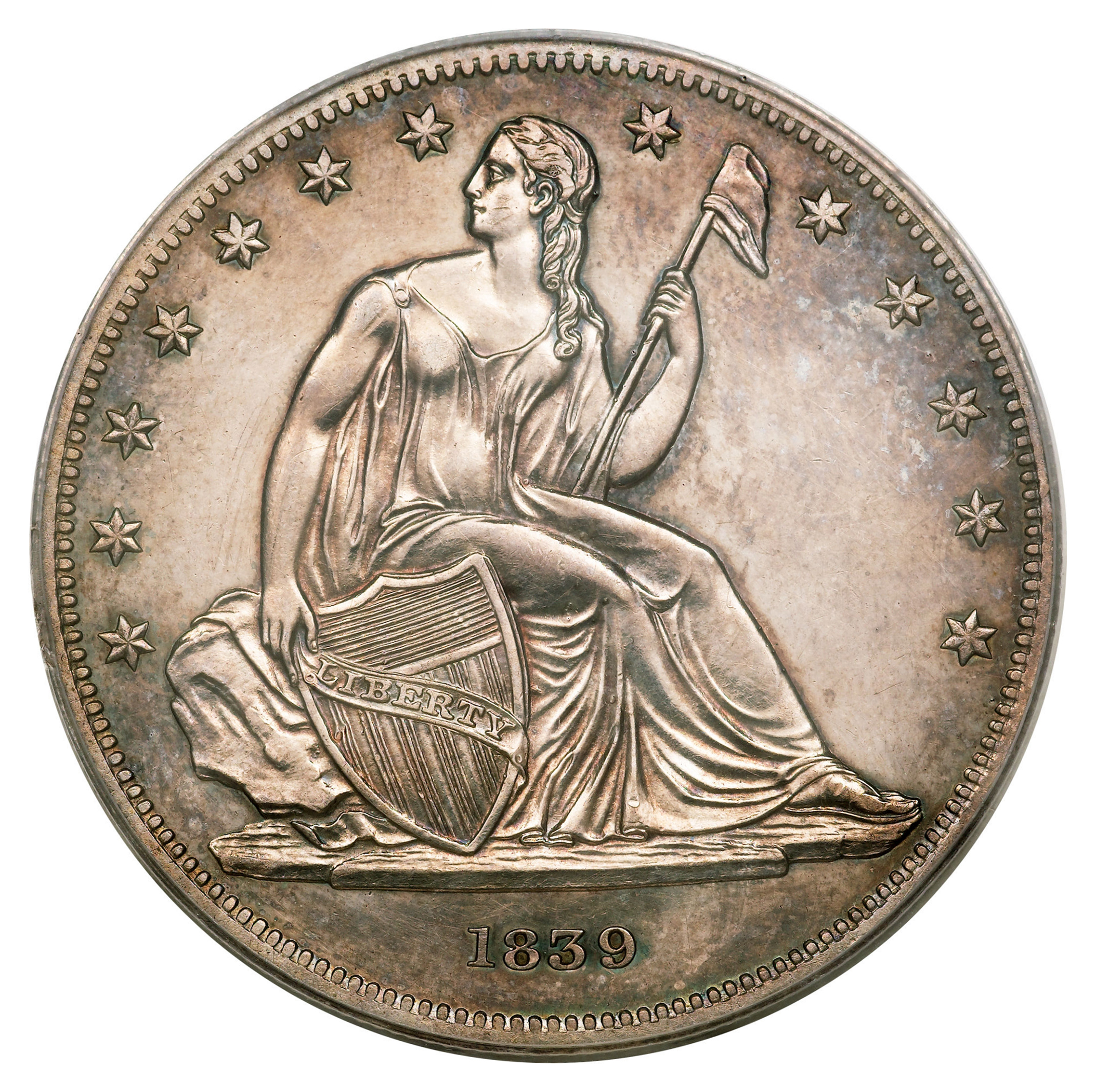
Obverse of 1839 United States Gobrecht dollar coin, the first of the "Seated Liberty" type

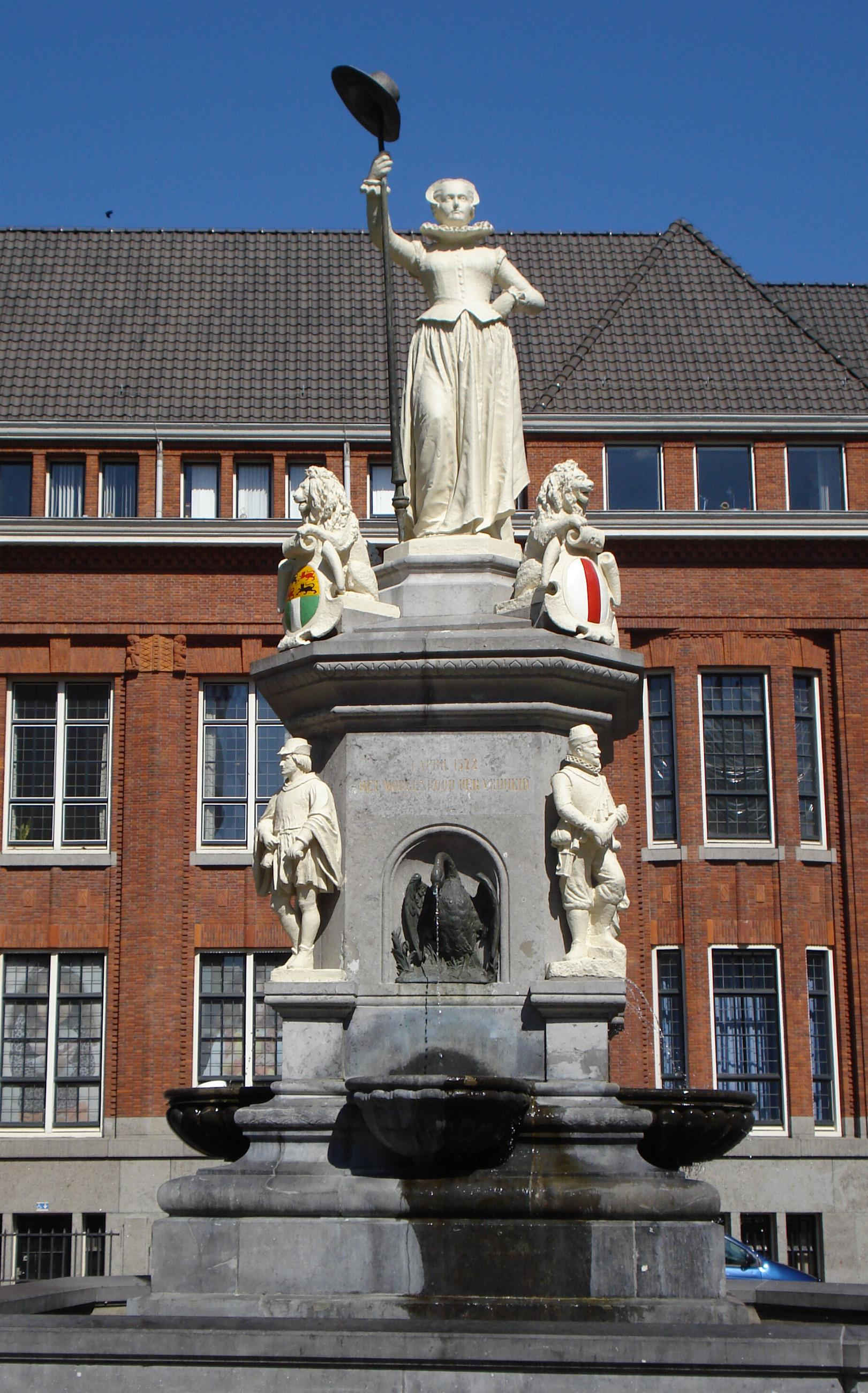
Dutch Maiden statue in Rotterdam, 1874, hat and costume in styles from the start of the Dutch Revolt.

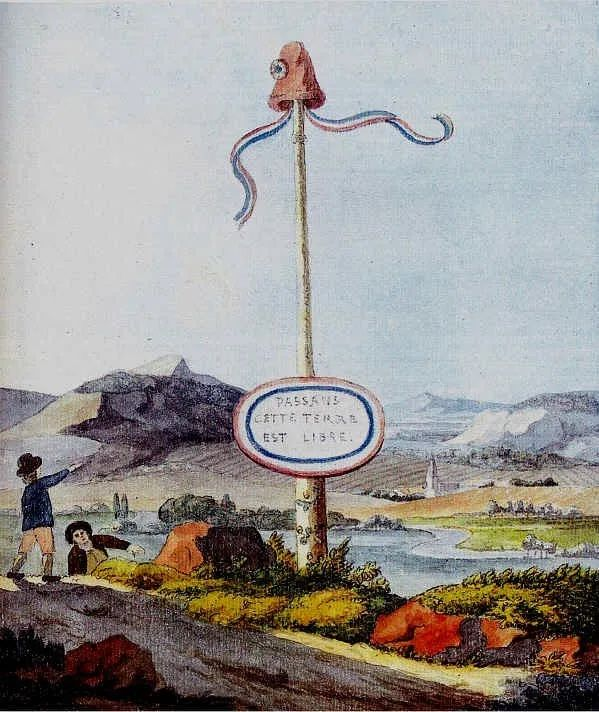
A liberty pole marking the French border at the Moselle river (modern Luxembourg) in 1793, drawn by Johann Wolfgang von Goethe. "Cette terre est libre" ("this land is free")

The image of Libertas holding a liberty pole can be found on the seals of some British American colonies, notably those of Trustee Georgia and North Carolina.

== American Revolution ==
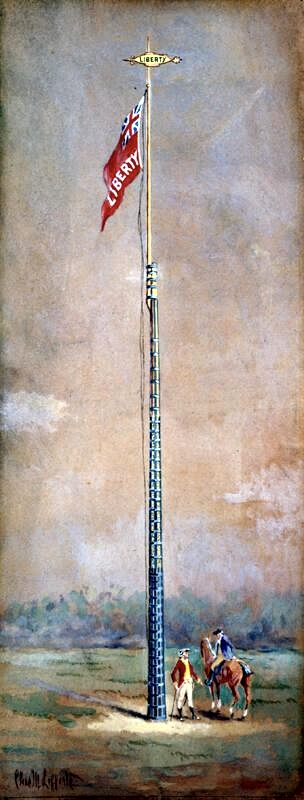
Fifth Liberty Pole, New York Commons, raised by the Liberty Boys

Liberty poles were often erected in town squares in the years before and during the American Revolution (e.g. Concord, Massachusetts; Newport, Rhode Island; Caughnawaga, New York; Savannah, Georgia and Englewood, New Jersey). Some colonists erected liberty poles on their own private land (such as in Bedford, Massachusetts since 1964 and Woburn, Massachusetts—the pole raising there is reenacted annually). An often violent struggle over liberty poles erected by the Sons of Liberty in New York City raged for 10 years. The poles were periodically destroyed by the royal authorities (see the Battle of Golden Hill), only to be replaced by the Sons with new ones. The conflict lasted from the repeal of the Stamp Act in 1766 until the revolutionary New York Provincial Congress came to power in 1775. The liberty pole in New York City had been crowned with a gilt vane bearing the single word, "Liberty".

In some locales—notably in Boston—a liberty tree rather than a pole served the same political purpose.

During the Siege of Boston on August 1, 1775, a tall liberty pole was erected on Prospect Hill, a fortified high-ground overlooking the road to British-occupied Boston. Both the "Appeal to Heaven" Pine Tree Flag and Continental Union Flag (also known as the Continental Colours) are reported to have flown on Prospect Hill. The 76 foot long liberty pole was originally a ship's mast that had been recently captured from the British armed schooner HMS Diana (1775), in the aftermath of the Battle of Chelsea Creek on May 27 and 28, 1775.

When an ensign was raised (usually red) on a liberty pole, it would be a calling for the Sons of Liberty or townspeople to meet and vent or express their views regarding British rule. The pole was known to be a symbol of dissent against Great Britain. The symbol is also apparent in many seals and coats of arms as a sign of liberty, freedom, and independence.

== Later uses ==
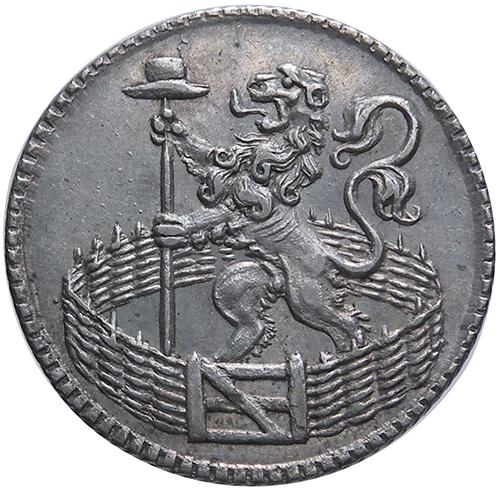
A Dutch coin of 1753 depicting the Leo Belgicus (national lion) holding a liberty pole

During the Whiskey Rebellion, which occurred from 1791 to 1794, locals in western Pennsylvania would erect poles along the roads or in town centers as a protest against the federal government's tax on distilled spirits, and evoke the spirit embodied by the liberty poles of decades earlier. These poles also allowed various communities in central Pennsylvania to signal their support to the western counties.

The arbres de la liberté ("liberty trees") were a symbol of the French Revolution, mostly living trees newly planted. The first was planted in 1790 by a pastor of a Vienne village, inspired by the 1765 Liberty Tree of Boston. One was also planted in front of the City Hall of Amsterdam on 4 March 1795, in celebration of the alliance between the French Republic and the Batavian Republic. In 1798, with the establishment of the short-lived Roman Republic, a liberty tree was planted in Rome's Piazza delle Scole, to mark the legal abolition of the Roman Ghetto. After resumption of Papal rule, the Vatican reinstated the Roman ghetto.

The liberty pole can also be seen on the coat of arms of Argentina.

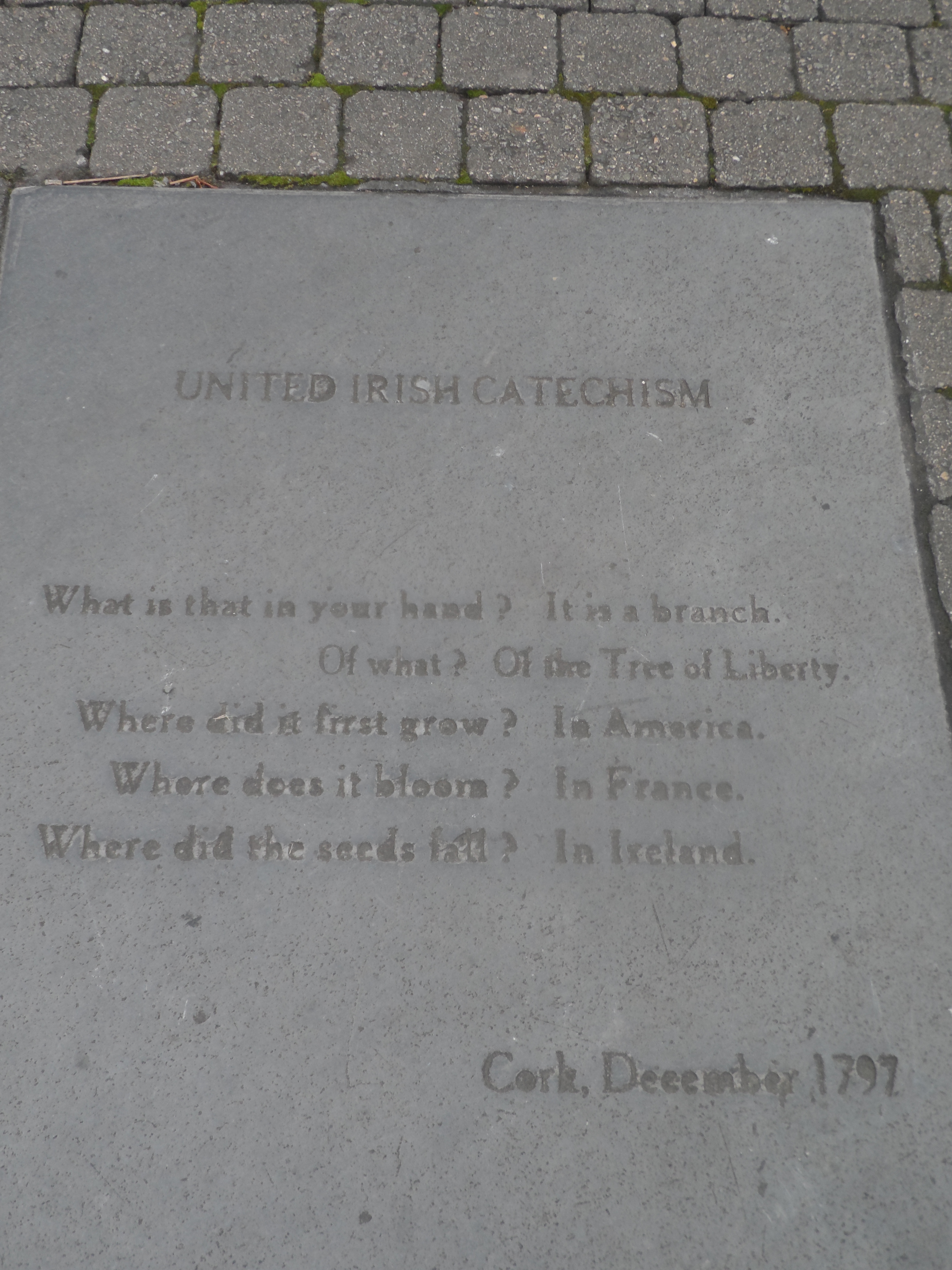
United Irish "catechism" carved in stone in Wexford. It makes explicit the connections of the United Irishmen with revolution in American and France, and mentions "branches" of the "tree of liberty".

The image of Liberty holding a pole topped by a Phrygian cap appears on many mid- and late-19th-century U.S. silver coins. These are broadly classified as United States Seated Liberty coinage.

=== Dedham Liberty Pole ===
In October 1798, Residents in Dedham, Massachusetts awoke to find a large wooden pole had been erected on the Hartford Road in Clapboard Trees parish. At the top was a hand painted sign declaring

No Stamp act; no sedition; no alien bill; no land tax.
Downfall to the tyrants of America; peace and
retirement to the President; long live the vice
President and the minority; May moral government
be the basis of civil government.

This liberty pole was erected by David Brown, an itinerant veteran of the American Revolution who traveled from town to town in Massachusetts, drumming up subscribers for a series of political pamphlets he had written. Brown was assisted by Benjamin Fairbanks and about 40 others. (Note: Some historians have suggested that the words were written by Nathaniel Ames.) Brown held the ladder while another, presumably Fairbanks, put up the sign. Nathaniel Ames was also very likely involved. When it appeared, Fisher Ames and the rest of Dedham's Federalist community were enraged.

Fairbanks, a prosperous farmer and former Selectman but also an "impressionable, rather excitable man," was quickly arrested and charged with violating the Sedition Act of 1798. Brown, on the other hand, eluded authorities until March 1799, when he was caught in Andover, 28 miles away.

When the trial came, Fairbanks was brought before the court first. Fairbanks, facing the "powerful forces" arrayed against him, confessed on June 8. Justice Samuel Chase sentenced Fairbanks to six hours in prison and a fine of five dollars, plus court costs of 10 shillings, the lightest sentence ever given for any of the Sedition Act defendants. (Note: Hanson has the fine as five shillings.)

On June 9, Brown also pled guilty, but he was not shown the same mercy as Fairbanks. Chase accepted the guilty plea, but insisted on trying the case anyway so that the "degree of his guilt might be duly ascertained." Chase offered Brown a chance to reduce his sentence by naming everyone involved with his "mischievous and dangerous pursuits," and the names of all those who subscribed to his pamphlets. Brown refused, saying, "I shall lose all my friends."

Brown was sentenced to 18 months in prison and a $480 fine, the harshest sentence ever imposed under the Sedition Act. As he did not have the money, and had no way of earning it while in prison, Brown petitioned President John Adams for a pardon in July 1800, and then again in February 1801. Adams refused both times, keeping Brown in prison. When Thomas Jefferson became president, one of his first acts was to issue a general pardon for any person convicted under the Sedition Act.

== Places ==
- Liberty Pole, Springwater, New York, United States; place name
- Liberty Pole, Wisconsin, United States; unincorporated community

== See also ==
- Maypole
- Fort Gaddis

== Bibliography ==
- Hanson, Robert Brand (1976). Dedham, Massachusetts, 1635-1890. Dedham Historical Society.
- Simon, James F. (March 10, 2003). What Kind of Nation: Thomas Jefferson, John Marshall, and the Epic Struggle to Create a United States. Simon and Schuster. ISBN 978-0-684-84871-6.
- Slack, Charles (2015). Liberty's First Crisis: Adams, Jefferson, and the Misfits Who Saved Free Speech. Atlantic Monthly Press. ISBN 978-0802123428.
- Tise, Larry E. (1998). The American counterrevolution: a retreat from liberty, 1783-1800. Stackpole Books. p. 421. ISBN 978-0-8117-0100-6.
- Warner, Marina, Monuments and Maidens: The Allegory of the Female Form, 2000, University of California Press, ISBN 0520227336, 9780520227330, google books
- Lurie, Shira, The American Liberty Pole: Popular Politics and the Struggle for Democracy in the Early Republic, 2023, University of Virginia Press, ISBN 0813950112, 9780813950129, UVA Press
