= John Lamb (general) =

American general (1735–1800)

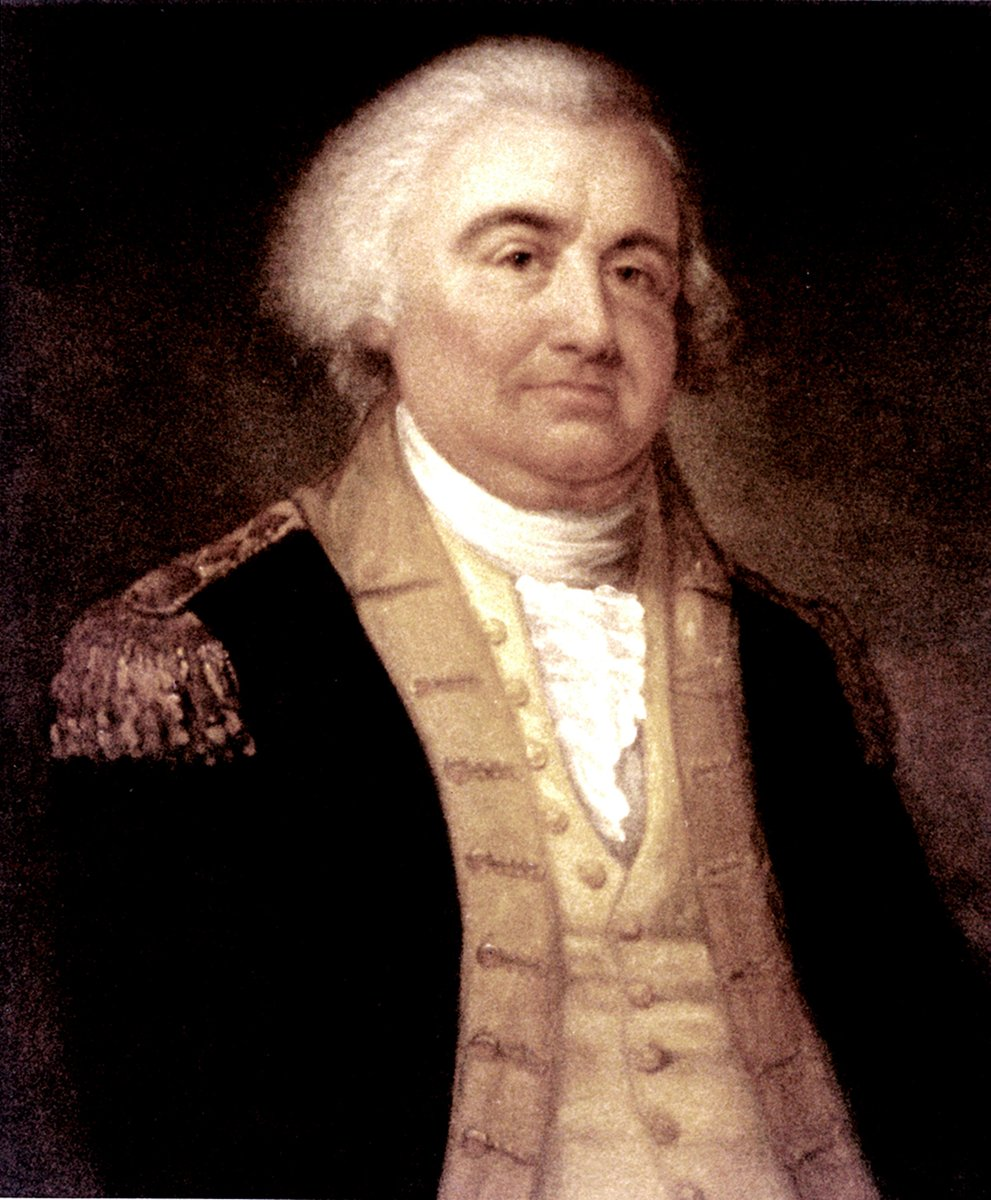

Collector of the Port of New York
- In office 1784–1797
- Appointed by: Congress of the Confederation
- President: George Washington
- Preceded by: Office established
- Succeeded by: Joshua Sands

Personal details
- Born: John Lamb; January 1, 1735 New York City, Province of New York, British America
- Died: May 31, 1800 (aged 65)
- Parent: Anthony Lamb (Father)

Military service
- Allegiance: United States
- Branch/service: Continental Army; United States Army
- Years of service: 1775–1783
- Rank: Brigadier General
- Battles/wars: American Revolutionary War • Battle of Quebec

John Lamb (1735–1800) was an American soldier, politician, and Anti-Federalist organizer (particularly in New York state). During the American Revolutionary War he led the 2nd Continental Artillery Regiment.

== Career ==
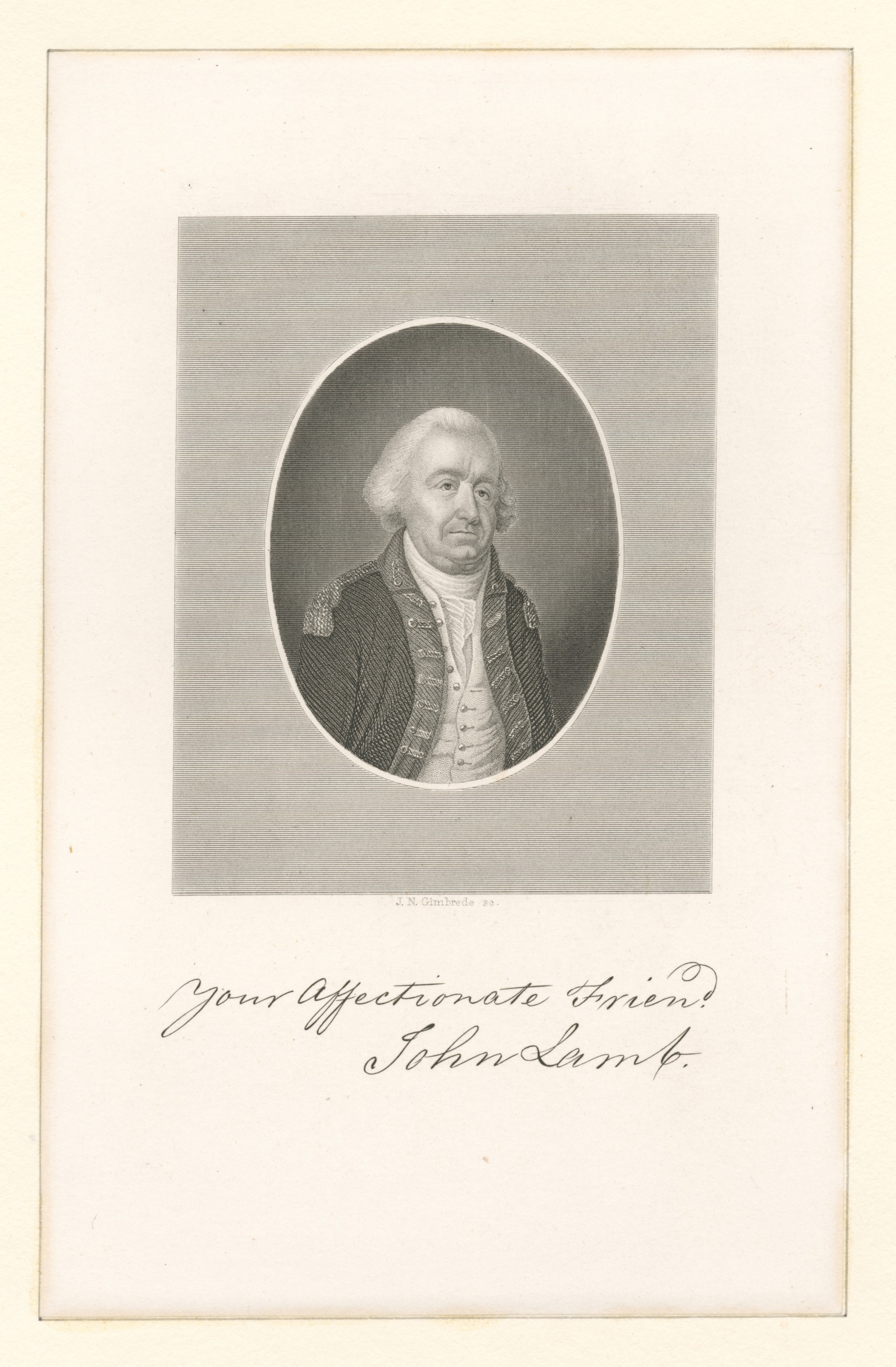
Image and signature of Lamb from the archives of the New York Public Library

He was born January 1, 1735, in New York City, the son of Anthony Lamb. His father was a convicted burglar who was transported to the colonies in the 1720s. John was initially trained as an optician and instrument maker in New York City and became a prosperous wine merchant.

Prior to the Revolutionary War, Lamb was a leader of the Liberty Boys and member of the Sons of Liberty. He wrote articles in and published anonymous handbills. When the news of the Battles of Lexington and Concord was received he and his men seized the military stores at Turtle Bay.

He was commissioned a captain of an artillery company and served under Richard Montgomery and Benedict Arnold in the Battle of Quebec. He was wounded and captured at the assault on Quebec city and was released on parole a few months later. He was appointed major of artillery on January 9, 1776. In January 1777 he was appointed colonel of the 2nd Continental Artillery Regiment. He commanded the artillery at West Point, New York in 1779 and 1780.

During the campaign and Siege of Yorktown, Lamb continued to command the 2nd Regiment. A monthly strength report from September 26, 1781, showed 200 officers and men under Lamb's command. On October 9, Lamb was the Officer of the Day when General Washington fired the first American cannon to open the siege. During the siege, the artillery served with distinction.

The artillery detachment, and Lamb's artillery in particular, were accorded high praise by both Washington and General Henry Knox, chief of artillery for the Continental Army. A General Order from the Commander-in-Chief relayed his thanks and appreciation to Lamb's artillery unit.

After the British surrender, Lamb was placed in temporary command of all the artillery, and oversaw its return to New York.

He was breveted a brigadier general on September 30, 1783.

In 1784 he was appointed Collector of Customs by the State of New York, and was retained as Federal Collector of the Port of New York during the Washington administration. His next role involved dealing with the ongoing threat of Barbary pirates to American commerce.

He was dismissed by President John Adams in 1797 after his deputy was accused of defrauding the Federal government of tax revenues.

== Anti-Federalism ==
During the 1787–1788 debates over the ratification of the proposed United States Constitution, Lamb was a prominent Anti-Federalist. He served as chairman of the Federal Republican Committee of New York, which operated to distribute Anti-Federalist writing and coordinate opposition to the Constitution with Anti-Federalists in other states. Between the fall of 1787 and June 1788 Lamb spread Anti-Federalist pamphlets through New York and New England and as far away as South Carolina; his correspondents included Joshua Atherton, Aedanus Burke, Patrick Henry, Richard Henry Lee, and other prominent Anti-Federalists.

He died in poverty May 31, 1800.

== See also ==
- William Goddard – Associate of Lamb during the postal campaign of 1774

== Link ==
Media related to John Lamb (1735–1800) at Wikimedia Commons

- John Lamb at Find a grave

Government offices
Preceded by new office	Collector of the Port of New York; 1789–1797	Succeeded by Joshua Sands
