= Sons of Liberty =

Dissident organization during the American Revolution

- The Rebellious Stripes Flag
- Leader: See below
- Dates active: 1765–1776
- Country: United Colonies (1775–1776)
- Allegiance: Continental Congress (1774–1776)
- Active regions: Massachusetts Bay; Rhode Island; New Hampshire; New Jersey; New York; Maryland; Virginia
- Ideology: Initial phase: "No taxation without representation" Rights of Englishmen; Later phase: Classical liberalism Republicanism; Separatism

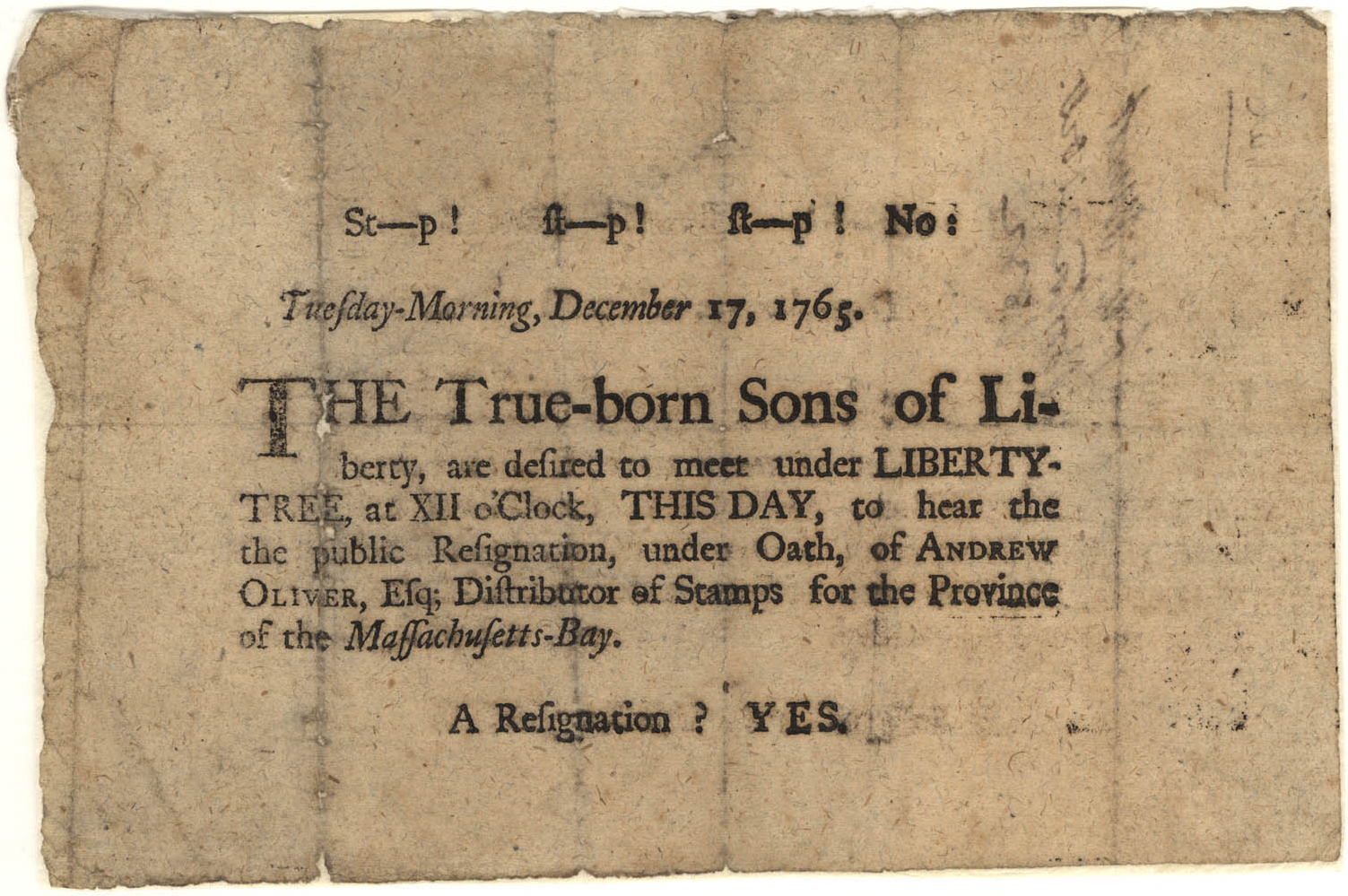
A 1765 handbill, announcing an upcoming "Sons of Liberty" public event

The Sons of Liberty was a loosely organized, clandestine, sometimes violent, political organization active in the Thirteen American Colonies founded to defend the rights of the colonists, including the right to representation in the British government trying to tax them. It played a major role in most colonies in battling the Stamp Act in 1765 and throughout most of the American Revolution (1765–1783).

In popular thought, the Sons of Liberty was a formal underground organization with recognized members and leaders. More likely, the name was an underground term for any men resisting the new Crown taxes and laws. The well-known label allowed organizers to make or create an anonymous summons to a Liberty Tree, "Liberty Pole", or other public meeting-place. Furthermore, a unifying name helped to promote inter-colonial efforts against Parliament and the Crown's actions. Their rallying cry "No taxation without representation” simplified and distilled the broad grievances with Britain down to one easily understood slogan.

== History ==
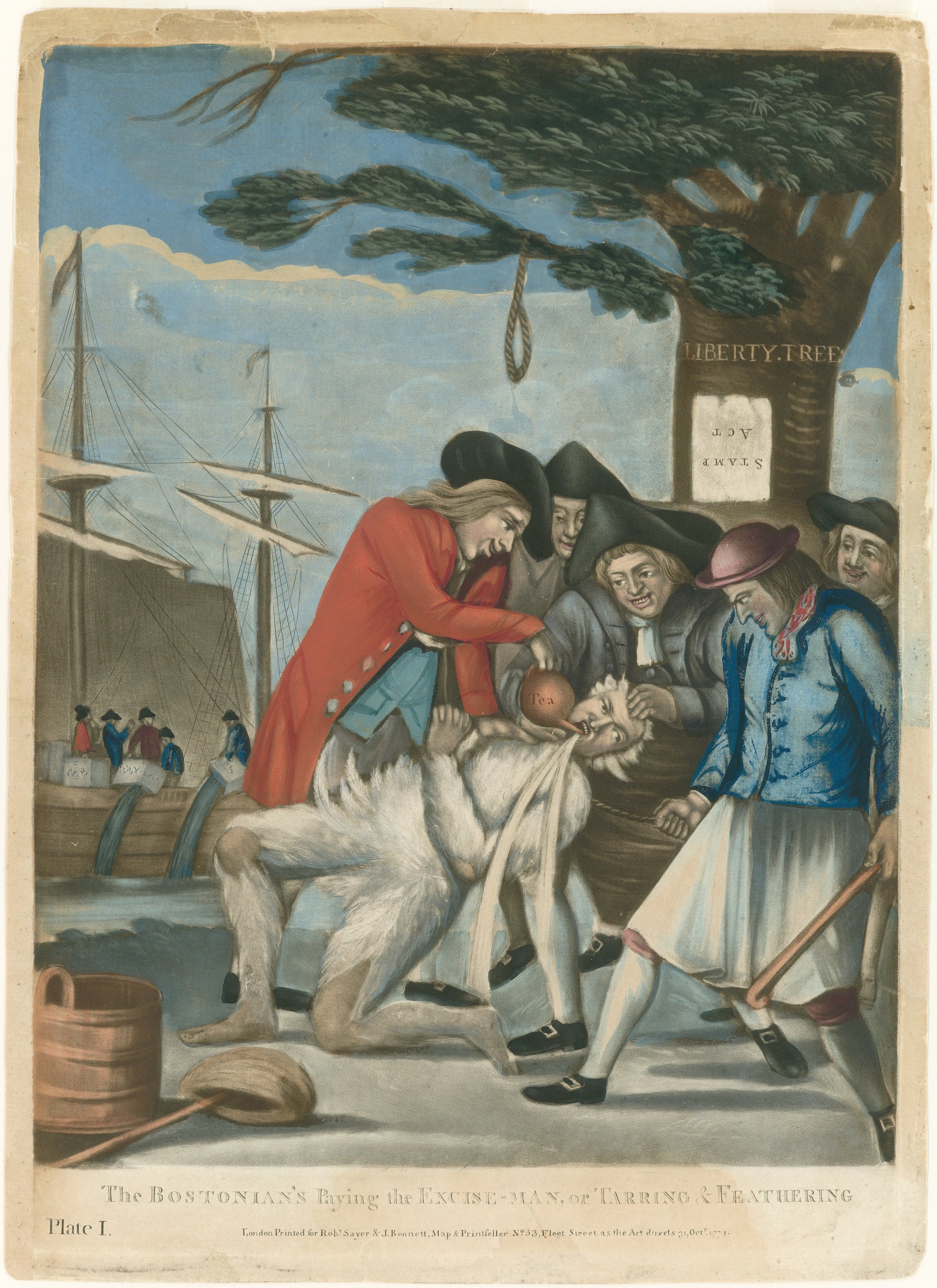
The Bostonian Paying the Excise-Man, 1774 British anti-American propaganda cartoon, referring to the tarring and feathering of Boston Commissioner of Customs John Malcolm four weeks after the Boston Tea Party. The men also are shown pouring "Tea" down Malcolm's throat; note the noose hanging on the Liberty Tree and the Stamp Act posted upside-down.

In 1765, the British government, already deeply indebted from the Seven Years' War (1756–1763), stationed an army of 10,000 officers and soldiers, and intended that the American colonists contribute financially to that force. The American colonies had been the theater of the related French and Indian War. The British passed a series of taxes aimed at the colonists, but many refused to pay, arguing that they should not be held accountable for taxes that were decided upon without any form of their consent through a representative. This became commonly known as "No Taxation without Representation". Parliament claimed authority to rule the colonies, even though the colonists had no representative in Parliament. The most incendiary tax was the Stamp Act of 1765, which caused a firestorm of opposition through legislative resolutions (starting in the colony of Virginia), public demonstrations, threats, and occasional hurtful losses.

The name is presumed to have been inspired by the phrase's use in a pro-American, anti-taxation speech in the House of Commons on February 6, 1765, by Irish-born MP Isaac Barré, a British veteran of the Seven Years' War. A precursor of the Sons of Liberty in Boston was the Loyal Nine, which burned effigies of Stamp Act commissioner Andrew Oliver in Boston on August 14, 1765. When he did not resign, the group escalated to burning down his office building. Even after he resigned, they almost destroyed the whole house of his close associate, Lieutenant Governor Thomas Hutchinson. It is believed that the Sons of Liberty did this to excite the lower classes and get them actively involved in rebelling against the authorities. Their actions made many of the stamp distributors resign in fear.

The organization spread after independent starts in several different colonies under various names. The name Sons of Liberty was used beginning in November in New York and Connecticut. By November 6, a committee was set up in New York City to correspond with other colonies, and by November 11, a meeting in Windham, Connecticut laid out organizational plans. In December, an alliance was formed between groups in New York and Connecticut, and the name of Sons of Liberty was first used in Boston. January bore witness to a correspondence link between Boston and New York City, and by March, Providence, Rhode Island had initiated connections with New York, New Hampshire, and Newport, Rhode Island. March also marked the emergence of Sons of Liberty organizations in New Jersey, Maryland, and Virginia.

To celebrate the repeal of the Stamp Act in 1766, the Sons of Liberty in Dedham, Massachusetts, erected the Pillar of Liberty.

The Sons of Liberty popularized the use of tar and feathering to punish and humiliate offending government officials starting in 1767. This method was also used against British Loyalists during the American Revolution. This punishment had long been used by sailors to punish their mates.

On August 14, 1769, the Boston Sons of Liberty held a public rally in celebration of the 4th Anniversary of their founding. At 11 in the morning, they gathered at the Liberty Tree in Boston, where they gave speeches and made toasts; they then paraded to the Liberty Tree Tavern in nearby Dorchester, where they held a celebratory dinner of 300 members of the organization in a tent set up next to the tavern, where "Music played, and at proper Intervals Cannon were fired. [...] About five o'clock, the Company left [the tavern] in a Procession that extended near a Mile and a half, and before Dark entered the City, went round the State House and retired each to his own House."

At this time in the history of their organization, they still considered themselves to be loyal subjects of the monarchy of Great Britain; when it came time at both events to give a round of toasts, the first toasts were to "The King, the Queen, and the Royal Family"; only much later during the course of the Revolution did they begin to stridently oppose giving any support to the monarchy.

The Bostonian branch of the Sons of Liberty was responsible for organizing and executing the famous Boston Tea Party of 1773 in response to the Tea Act.

Early in the American Revolution, the former Sons of Liberty generally joined more formal groups, such as the Committee of Safety.

=== New York ===
"The association of the Sons of Liberty was organized in 1765, soon after the passage of the Stamp Act, and extended throughout the colonies, from Massachusetts to South Carolina. It appears that New York was the central post from which communications were dispatched, to and from the east and to the south as far as Maryland..."

While the exact name "Sons of Liberty" may not have been taken up as their official moniker by the leaders of the New York opposition to the Stamp Act in 1765 - they were popularly known there around that time as the "Liberty Boys" - it appears that they were known to other "Sons of Liberty" organizations in other states by that name not long after that time. There is a letter written by the "Sons of Liberty" in Baltimore, Maryland, "to the Sons of Liberty in New York", dated 6 March 1766, in which the Baltimore "Sons" thanked their New York brethren for having forced Zachariah Hood, who had been appointed stamp-master for Maryland, into resigning his commission. Hood had arrived in New York on a ship from London, and as soon as his mission became known to The Liberty Boys of New York, they arranged for a meeting with him at which they reasoned with him in their own inimitable way and thus secured his "resignation."

A list of New York members of the Sons of Liberty compiled by the Sons in Maryland, written on 1 March 1766, lists the following correspondents in the colony of New York: "New York [city] — John Lamb, Isaac Sears, William Wiley, Edward Laight, Thomas Robinson, Flores Bancker, Charles Nicoll, Joseph Allicoke, and Gershom Mott. Jer. Van Rensselaer, Maynard Roseboom, Rob. Henry, and Thos. Young, Albany. John S. Hobart, Gilbert Potter, Thomas Brush, Cornelius Conklin, and Nathaniel Williams, Huntington, Long Island. George Townsend, Barack Sneething, Benjamin Townsend, George Weeks, Michael Weeks, and Rowland Chambers, Oyster Bay, Long Island."

In December 1773, a new group calling itself the Sons of Liberty issued and distributed a declaration in New York City called the Association of the Sons of Liberty in New York, which formally stated that they were opposed to the Tea Act and that anyone who assisted in the execution of the act was "an enemy to the liberties of America" and that "whoever shall transgress any of these resolutions, we will not deal with, or employ, or have any connection with him. In 1774, the New York Sons of Liberty took part in the New York Tea Party.

After the end of the American Revolutionary War, Isaac Sears, Marinus Willet, and John Lamb revived in New York City the Sons of Liberty. In March 1784, they rallied an enormous crowd that called for the expulsion of any remaining Loyalists from the state, starting May 1. The Sons of Liberty were able to gain enough seats in the New York assembly elections of December 1784 to pass a set of punitive laws against Loyalists. In violation of the Treaty of Paris (1783), they called for the confiscation of the property of Loyalists. Alexander Hamilton defended the Loyalists, citing the supremacy of the treaty.

== Flags ==
An original flag flown from the Liberty Tree is in the collection of Revolutionary Spaces in Boston at the Old State House. The flag is wool with nine vertical stripes, four white and five red. The owner of the flag post-Revolution, Samuel "Rat-Trap" Adams, claimed that the flag was used by the Sons of Liberty, although there is no contemporary documentation of a non-British striped flag used by the Sons of Liberty. A flag having 13 horizontal red and white stripes was used by the Continental Navy and by American merchant ships during the war, although the two styles of flag do not appear to be related.

== Famous Sons of Liberty ==
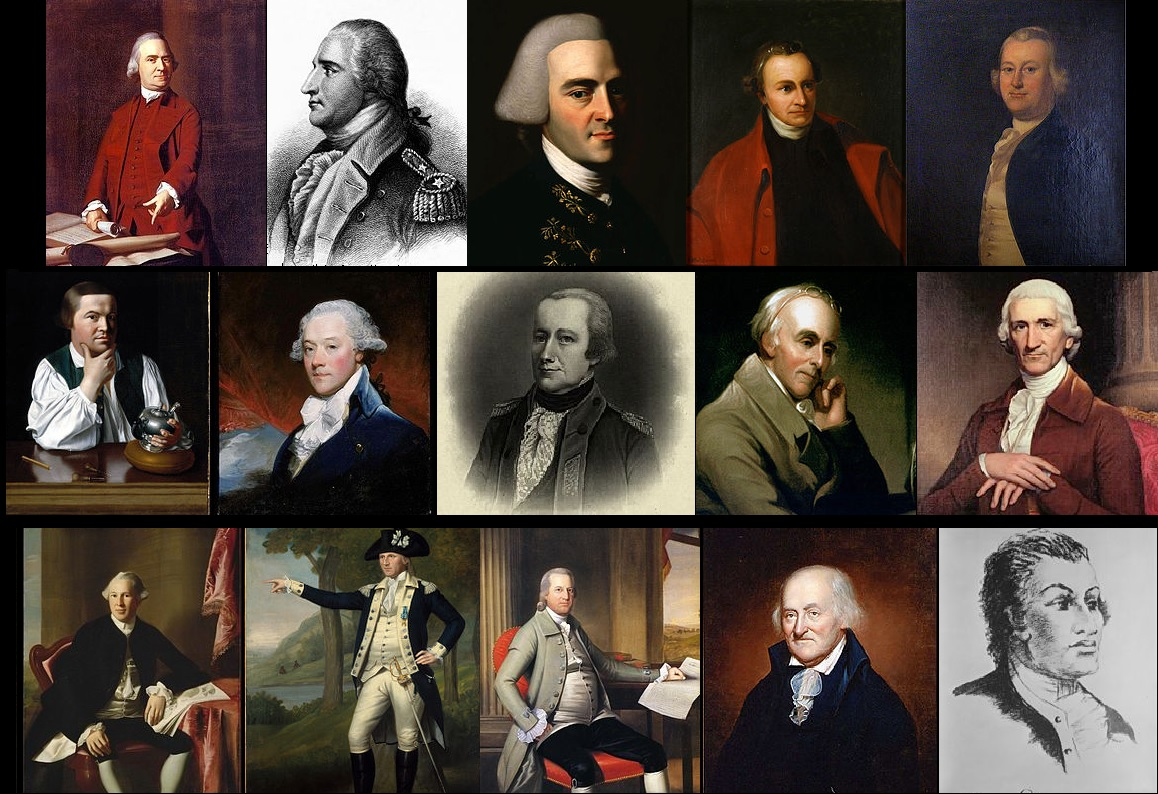
1st row: Samuel Adams • Benedict Arnold • John Hancock • Patrick Henry • James Otis, Jr. 2nd row: Paul Revere • James Swan • Alexander McDougall • Benjamin Rush • Charles Thomson 3rd row: Joseph Warren • Marinus Willett • Oliver Wolcott • Christopher Gadsden • Haym Salomon Not pictured: Hercules Mulligan, Thomas Melvill, Isaac Sears

=== Boston ===
- Samuel Adams – political writer, tax collector, cousin of John Adams, fire warden. Founded the Sons of Liberty
- Benjamin Church – first Surgeon-General of the United States Army, convicted of "communicating with the enemy", banished from Massachusetts in 1778
- Benjamin Edes – journalist/publisher Boston Gazette
- Benjamin Kent – Attorney General
- John Hancock – merchant, smuggler, fire warden
- James Otis – lawyer, Massachusetts
- Paul Revere – silversmith, fire warden
- James Swan – financier
- Isaiah Thomas – printer, Boston, then Worcester, first to read the Declaration of Independence in Massachusetts
- Joseph Warren – doctor, soldier
- Thomas Young – doctor

=== New York ===
- Joseph Allicocke – One of the leaders of the Sons, and possibly of African ancestry.
- John Lamb – trader and leader of Liberty Boys
- Alexander McDougall – captain of privateers
- Hercules Mulligan – haberdasher, spy under George Washington for the Continental Army, friend of Alexander Hamilton
- Isaac Sears – captain of privateers
- Haym Salomon – financial broker, New York and Philadelphia
- Marinus Willett – militia officer, cabinet maker, student, and leader of the New York Armory Raid
- Jacobus Van Zandt - Merchant, Continental Navy agent

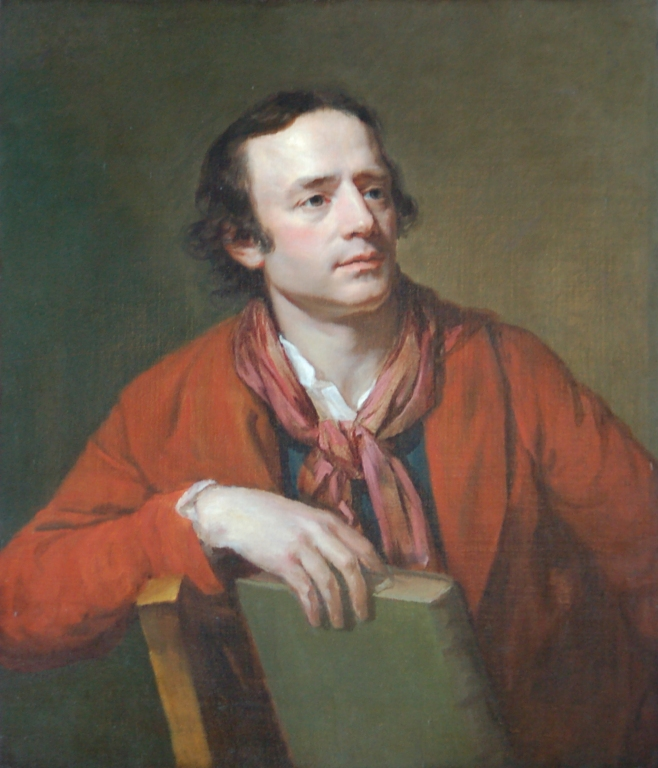
Isaac Barré's use of the term "Sons of Liberty" during his opposition to the Stamp Act popularized it.

=== Other ===
- Benedict Arnold – businessman, later General in the Continental Army; General in the British Army after changing sides
- Timothy Bigelow – blacksmith, Worcester, Massachusetts
- John Brown – business leader of Providence, Rhode Island
- Samuel Chase – signer of the Declaration of Independence
- John Crane – carpenter, colonel in command of the 3rd Continental Artillery Regiment, Braintree, Massachusetts
- William Ellery – signer of the Declaration of Independence
- Christopher Gadsden – merchant, Charleston, South Carolina
- William Goddard (1740–1817) – publisher, co-founder of the US Post Office with Benjamin Franklin
- Patrick Henry – lawyer, Virginia
- Jedediah Huntington – General in the Continental Army
- Samuel Huntington – signer of the Declaration of Independence
- William Paca – signer of the Declaration of Independence
- Charles Willson Peale – portrait painter and saddle maker, Annapolis, Maryland
- Matthew Phripp – merchant, chairman of the Norfolk committee of safety, prominent Freemason, and colonel of the militia. Norfolk, Virginia
- Benjamin Rush – physician, Philadelphia
- Charles Thomson – tutor, secretary, Philadelphia
- William Williams – signer of the Declaration of Independence

== Later societies ==
At various times, small secret organizations took the name "Sons of Liberty". They generally left very few records. In the early 19th century, there was an organization in Bennington, Vermont named the Sons of Liberty; this organisation included local notables such as military officer Martin Scott and Hiram Harwood.

The Improved Order of Red Men, established in 1834, claimed to be descended from the original Sons of Liberty, noting that the Sons participated in the Boston Tea Party dressed as their idea of "Indians".

The name was also used during the American Civil War. The Copperhead group, the Knights of the Golden Circle, reorganized in 1863 as the "Order of American Knights". In 1864, it became the Order of the Sons of Liberty, with the Ohio politician Clement L. Vallandigham, most prominent of the Copperheads, as its supreme commander. In most areas, only a minority of its membership was radical enough to discourage enlistments, resist the draft, and shield deserters. The group held numerous peace meetings. A few agitators, some of them encouraged by Southern money, talked of a revolt in the Old Northwest, to end the war. In 1864, both the KGC and the Order of the Sons of Liberty were prosecuted for treason by federal authorities, especially in Indiana.

In 1948, a radical wing of the Zionist movement, calling itself the "Sons of Liberty", launched a boycott of British films in the U.S.; this was in response to British policies in Palestine.

== See also ==
- Loyal Nine, precursor to the Sons of Liberty
- Daughters of Liberty
- Stamp Act Congress
- Patriot (American Revolution)
- Sons of Liberty (miniseries)
- Liberty Tree (Charleston)
