= Thomas Oliver (lieutenant governor) =

Colonial American politician

Thomas Oliver (January 5, 1733/34 – November 20, 1815) was the last royal lieutenant-governor of the Province of Massachusetts Bay.

== Early life ==
Born in Antigua to a slave owner Robert Oliver (c.1700-1762) and his wife Anne Brown, Thomas Oliver graduated from Harvard College in 1753. His father had moved to Dorchester, Massachusetts before 1747.

After his marriage in 1760, Oliver lived in Dorchester, where his first two children were born. In 1766 Cambridge. He sold his Dorchester house in 1770, within the family, to Richard Lechmere, husband of his wife's aunt Mary Phips. He commissioned John Nutting to build him the house later known as Elmwood in Cambridge.

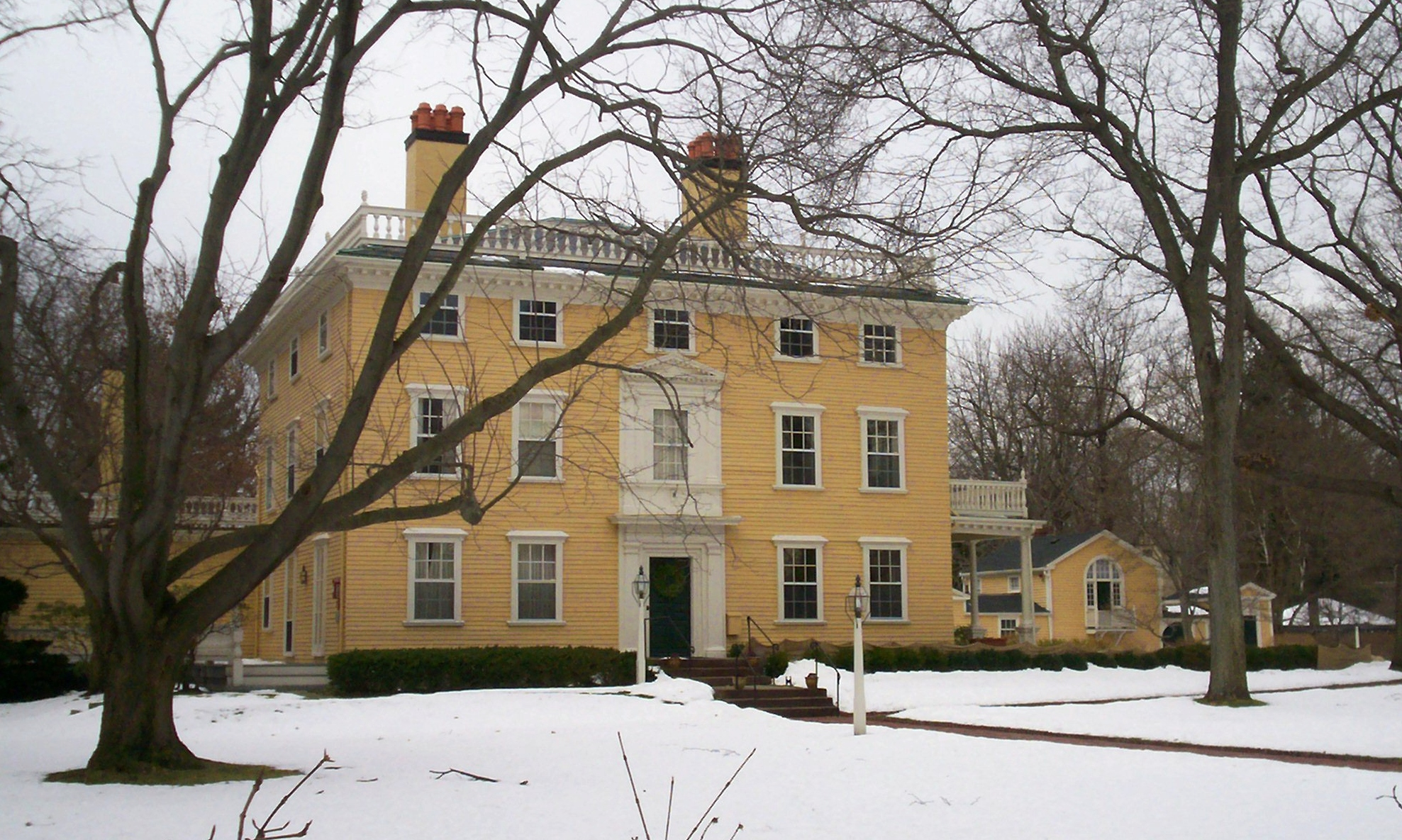
Elmwood, 2008 photograph, the 1760s "Tory Row" house built for Thomas Oliver

Oliver's personal wealth meant he did not engage in business. He did not involve himself in politics. He held the rank of lieutenant-colonel in the Massachusetts Bay Militia's 1st Regiment.

== American Revolution ==
When the provincial lieutenant governor Andrew Oliver died in 1774, Thomas Oliver was appointed his successor by King George III. He was also one of the Cambridge men nominated to the Mandamus Council, of which he was President.

On September 1, 1774, the Powder Alarm incident triggered by David Phips and William Brattle, acting for General Thomas Gage, resulted in an attack on the Cambridge house of Jonathan Sewall. The following day Oliver traveled into Boston to advise General Thomas Gage not to send troops against the crowds from Middlesex County assembling in Cambridge. On his return, Oliver found his house surrounded. Under duress, he signed a resignation from his post as lieutenant governor.

Oliver left for Boston, remaining there for over a year. He chaired one meeting of the Massachusetts Council after Gage's departure. When the British troops sailed to Halifax in March 1776, Oliver went with them, going on to England. His movements around the Bristol area are described in the correspondence of the Loyalist Samuel Curwen, in England from 1775. He was proscribed under the Massachusetts Banishment Act in 1778, and his estate was confiscated.

== Later life ==
In connection with the transient colony of New Ireland, Oliver was mentioned by William Knox (1732–1810) as a potential Governor, with Daniel Leonard as Chief Justice.

In 1783, Oliver was recorded as having owned in America 11 slaves: Buff, Cato, Jerry, Jeoffry, Samuel, Mira, Jude, Sarah, Violet, Jenny, and "Young Jerry".

Oliver died in Bristol in 1815, and was buried at St Paul's Church, Bristol. The British government continued to recognize him as lieutenant governor of Massachusetts and paid his salary until he died. His plantation and enslaved people at Friar's Hill on Antigua passed to a group of heirs including his son-in-law Henry Haynes.

== Family ==
In 1760 Oliver married Elizabeth Vassall, also from a family of West Indies plantation owners, who had settled in Massachusetts. Elizabeth Vassall was the daughter of Col. John Vassall I (1713–1747) and his first wife Elizabeth Phips, daughter of Spencer Phips.

Oliver's first wife Elizabeth died in 1779. He married, secondly in 1881, Harriet Freeman, daughter and heiress of the slave-owner Byam Freeman (died 1771) in Antigua. He had six daughters by his first wife Elizabeth, and two with Harriet. A pedigree for "Oliver of Massachusetts" appears in vol. II of Vere Langford Oliver's History of the Island of Antigua.

- Anne Oliver (born 1763), married in 1785 John Proctor Anderdon.
- Elizabeth Oliver (1765 or 1768 – 1826), married in 1788 Joseph Rogers.
- Penelope Oliver (1771–1815), married in 1793 John Cave of Brentry, son of the Bristol banker John Cave. His sister Susanna (1767–1846) had married Thomas Daniel in 1789. In 1817 he was resident at Brentry House. He married, secondly in 1819, Catharine Margaret Strachan. She was the daughter of John Strachan of Cliffden, Teignmouth, a claimant to the Strachan baronetcy of 1625.
- Lucy Oliver (1772–1857), married in 1798 Henry Hope Tobin, son of James Tobin.
- Mary Oliver, married in 1798 Charles Anthony Partridge (1771–1856). He was the son of Charles Partridge (died 1805) of Cotham Lodge near Bristol, and his wife Sybella Pollard. His sister Clarissa married Samuel Peach Peach. The cleric William Edwards Partridge (died 1886) was his son.
- Frances Oliver (born 1780, will proved 1848), unmarried.
- Harriet Watkins Oliver (1785–1826), seventh daughter, married in 1816 Capt. Henry Haynes RN.
- Emily Freeman Oliver (died 1836), married James Elton "of fortune", appointed recorder of Tiverton in 1832. The couple had ten children. He was the son of the Bristol merchant William Elton (1740–1819) and his wife Margaret Mitchell, daughter of Thomas Mitchell. Oliver Elton was a grandson.
