= George Maddison (British Army officer) =

British Army officer and colonial administrator (1729–1799)

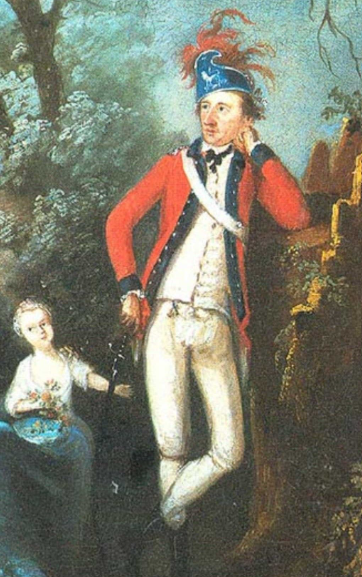

Lieutenant governor of Saint Vincent
- In office 1763–1764
- Preceded by: Position established
- Succeeded by: Unknown

Personal details
- Born: 29 August 1729 Ketton, England
- Died: 10 January 1806 (aged 76) Dunstable, England
- Spouse(s): Mary Baugh (m. 11 Oct 1757, died 1787)
- Children: 3

Military service
- Allegiance: Great Britain
- Branch/service: British Army
- Years of service: 1745–1775
- Rank: Lieutenant colonel
- Commands: 4th (King's Own) Regiment of Foot
- Battles/wars: War of the Austrian Succession; Battle of Fontenoy; Battle of Rocoux; Seven Years' War; Battle of Warburg; Battle of Kloster Kampen; Battle of Villinghausen; Battle of Wilhelmsthal; Spanish invasion of Portugal (1762); American War of Independence; Battles of Lexington and Concord; Siege of Boston; Battle of Bunker Hill

Lieutenant-Colonel George Maddison (29 August 1729 – 10 January 1806) was a British Army officer and colonial administrator who served as the lieutenant governor of Saint Vincent from 1763 to 1764. Maddison served as the commander of the 4th (King's Own) Regiment of Foot. Maddison led his regiment in several engagements of the American War of Independence, including the battles of Concord and Bunker Hill. Maddison is most known for his actions during the 1774 Powder Alarm, where he led 260 regulars to remove 250 sub-barrels of powder to Castle William.

== Early career ==
Maddison was born on 29 August 1729 in Ketton, Rutland, England, to John Maddison, and his wife, Katherine Whichcote. Maddison was commissioned into the British army, aged around 16, joining the 11th Regiment of Foot. Maddison presumably served with his regiment abroad during the War of the Austrian Succession, and fighting at the Battles of Fontenoy and Rocoux

Maddison was promoted to captain on January 20, 1750. The regiment embarked for the continent in spring 1760 for service in the Seven Years' War; it fought at the Battle of Warburg in July 1760, the Battle of Kloster Kampen in October 1760 and the Battle of Villinghausen in July 1761 Maddison was promoted again to major on may 9th, 1762. Maddison and his regiment fought at the Battle of Wilhelmsthal in June 1762 and the inconclusive Iberian campaign.

On his return to England, on April 20, 1763, Maddison is promoted yet again to lieutenant-colonel of the 4th (King's Own) Regiment of Foot, currently in the west indies. Maddison was further appointed Lieutenant governor of Saint Vincent. Several islands, including Saint Vincent had recently been won during the recent war, and Brittan established the Windward Islands, with the Governor of Barbados becoming the Governor of Grenada and the Grenadines, St. Vincent and Tobago, with each island having its own lieutenant-governor. This arrangement was plagued with the difficulty of west to east communication among the islands in the days of sail.

In the spring of 1764, Maddison's tenure of Lieutenant governor ended, and both he and his regiment returned to England, arriving in July, and commenced recruiting its diminished numbers. In 1768, the King's Own proceeded to Scotland, where they were stationed during the four succeeding years, but returned to England in the spring of 1773, and remained on home service until the following year, when they were again ordered to hold themselves in readiness to proceed abroad.

== North America ==
Maddison and the King's Own, were one of the corps selected to proceed to North America, embarked for that service on the 17th of April, 1774. After landing at Boston the King's Own were encamped for some time near the town; and the violent revolutionary spirit which many of the colonists displayed, occasioned a detachment of the regiment to be sent during the winter to Marshfield, for the protection of a number of the friends of the government in that town and neighborhood.

Amidst growing tension between Great Britain and its American colonies, Sheriff David Phips was dispatched on August 31, 1774 to William Brattle under orders of governor Thomas Gage to remove the British-owned gunpowder to Castle William; Brattle turned the key to the powder house over to Phips. Gage also gave orders to ready a force of troops for action the next day, something that did not go unnoticed by the local population. At some point that day, Gage, whether by his intent, accident, or theft by a messenger, lost possession of the August 27 letter from William Brattle; the widely held story is that it was dropped. News of its content spread rapidly, and many considered it to be a warning to Gage to remove the powder before Patriots could seize it.

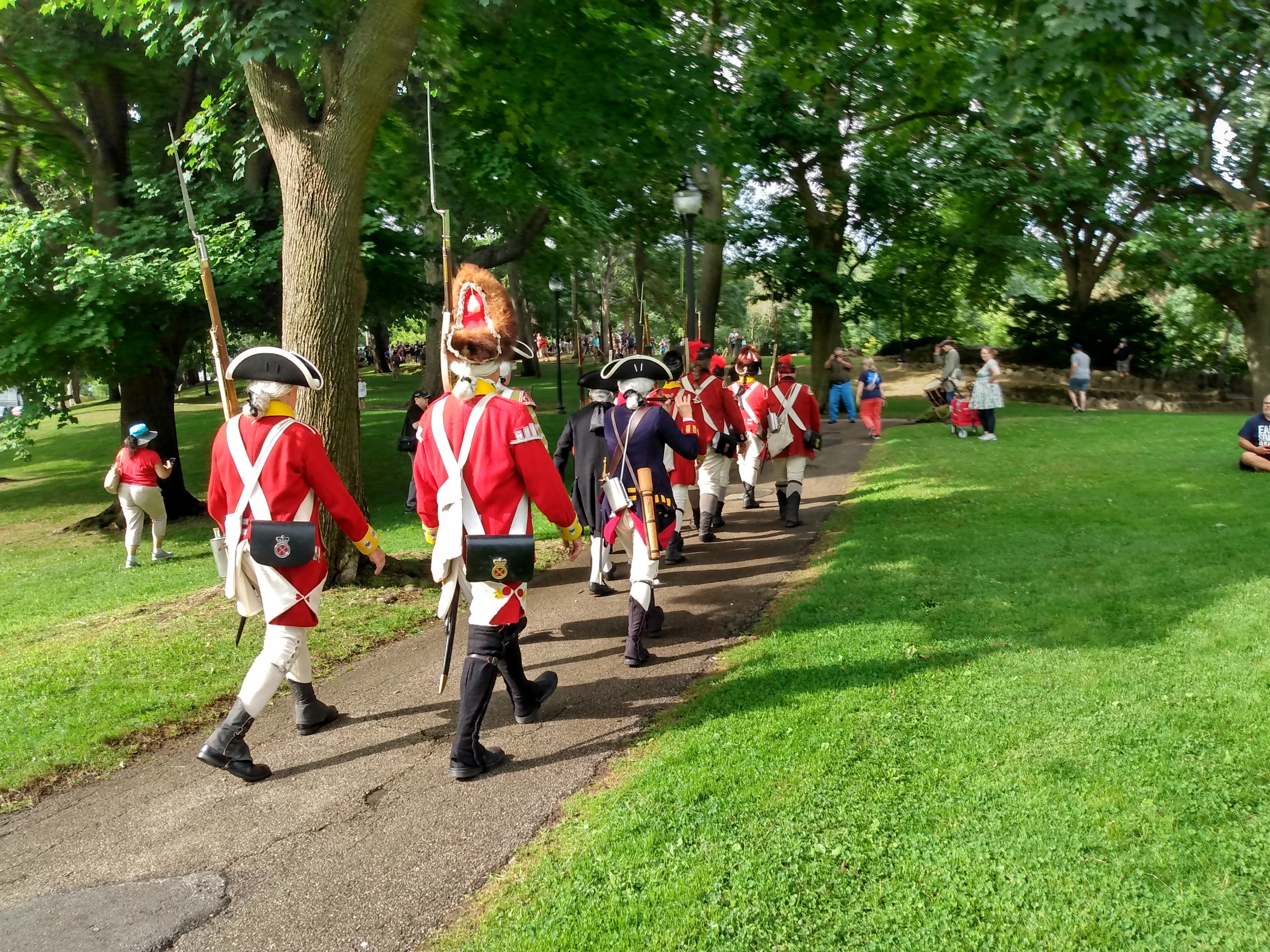
Re-enactors portraying the 4th Regiment of Foot marching to the Powder House for the 250th anniversary commemoration, September 2024

Early in the morning of September 1, a force of roughly 260 regulars from the 4th Regiment of Foot, under the command of Maddison, was rowed in secrecy up the Mystic River from Boston to a landing point near Winter Hill in modern-day Somerville. From there they marched about a mile (1.6 km) to the Powder House, a gunpowder magazine that held the largest supply of gunpowder in Massachusetts. Phips gave the King's Troops the keys to the building, and after sunrise, they removed all of the remaining gunpowder. Most of the regulars then returned to Boston the way they had come, but a small contingent marched to Cambridge, removed two field pieces, and took them to Boston by foot over the Great Bridge and up Boston Neck. The field pieces and powder were then taken from Boston to Castle William.

In the aftermath of the operation, false rumors flew throughout the day across the countryside about the British troop movements. The regulars were marching; provincial powder had been seized; war was at hand; people had been killed; Boston was being bombarded by His Majesty's warships. The alarm spread as far as Connecticut. From all over the region, people took up arms and began streaming toward Boston. On September 2, several thousand men bent on violence gathered in Cambridge, where they forced several notable Loyalists, including Brattle, to flee to Boston seeking the protection of the British military. Phips was forced, in writing, to dissociate himself from any and all government actions. Eventually facts caught up with the rumors, and militia units (some of which were still heading toward Boston) returned home.

Maddison remained in command of his regiment during the siege, and during the costly British victory at the Battle of Bunker Hill. By November, he was replaced as commander of his regiment by lieutenant-colonel Harry Blunt. He remained in the city, and left when the British evacuated the city on March 17, 1776, retiring first to Halifax, and then to England.

== Death ==
He died on 10 January 1806, aged 76 in Dunstable, Bedfordshire, England, having outlived his wife by 15 years.

== Personal life ==
Maddison married Mary Baugh, the daughter of Captain Lancelot Baugh on October 11, 1757, in Portsmouth, England. She died in 1791. They had three children:

1. Colonel George Maddison (1762-)
2. Colonel John Thomas Maddison (1759-1837)
3. Katharine Blacker (Maddison) (1769-1823)
