= John Nutting (loyalist) =

American Loyalist

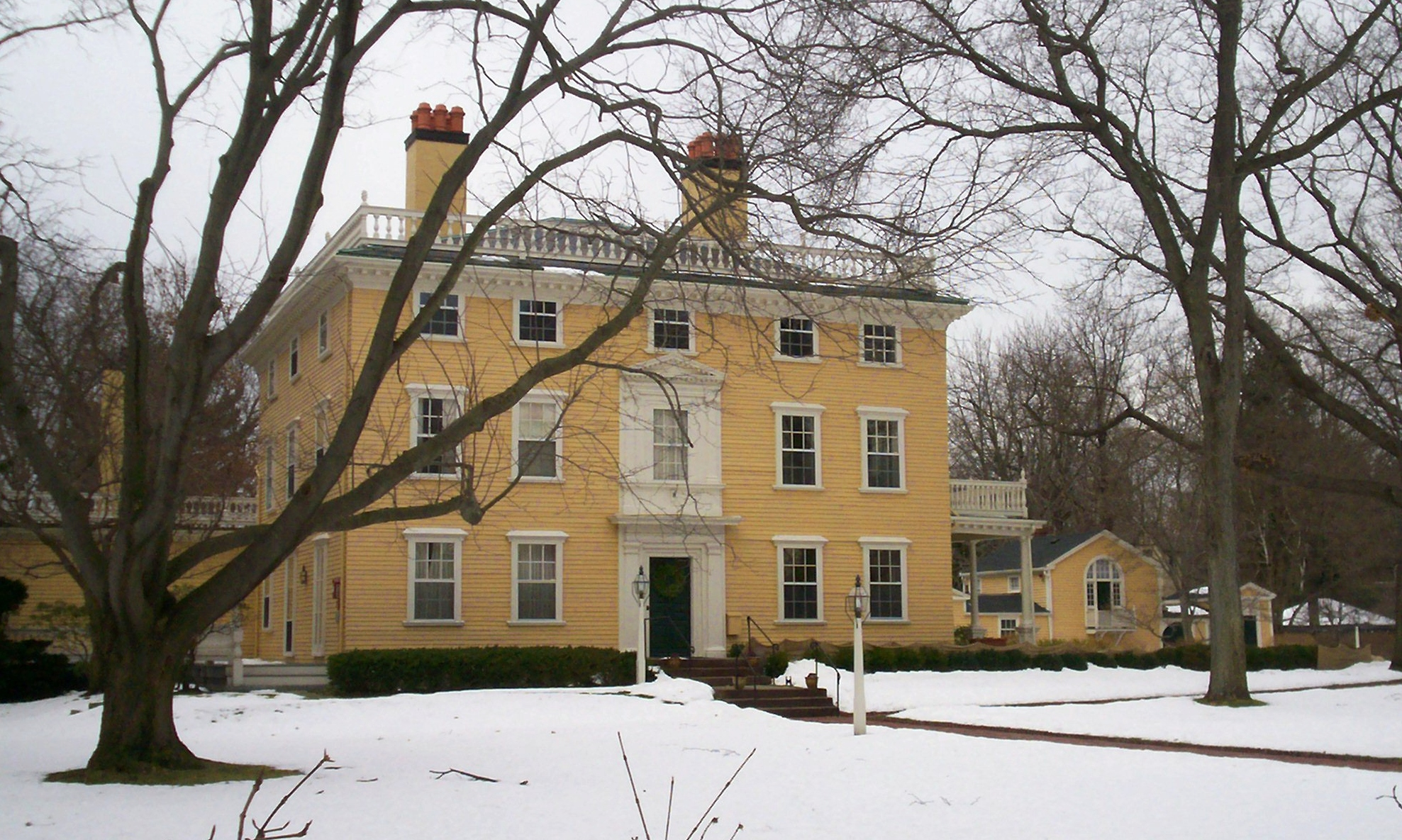
Nutting built Lt. Governor's house Elmwood, currently the official residence of the Presidents of Harvard University

John Nutting (14 January 1739, Cambridge, Massachusetts – 1800, Newport, Nova Scotia) was the Master Builder and Surveyor of Lumber for the King in New Ireland and later Nova Scotia. He fought for the British in the French and Indian War and worked as a Loyalist throughout the American Revolution. He contributed to the successful defence of New Ireland from a 21 day siege by the Penobscot Expedition.

== French and Indian War ==
He was a member of Captain Fuller’s company of William Brattle’s regiment (1746). The next year he enlisted under Captain Aaron Fay in Col Ebenezer Nichols's regiment at Lake George in 1758. He fought with Abercrombie against Montcalm at Ticonderoga.

He married Mary Walton 23 April 1761 of Reading, Massachusetts. They built a home in Cambridge, Massachusetts near present-day Epworth Church. He worked under his father-in-law John Walton as a master builder and was in the lumber trade. He built Lieut Governor Thomas Oliver’s house, later named Elmwood, currently the official residence of the Presidents of Harvard University.

== American Revolution ==
On 1 September 1774, he was involved with the Powder Alarm, when tried to block those who wanted to prevent General Gage’s intention to move the Magazine of Powder to Boston. He was physically beaten by the patriots but escaped Cambridge to Boston. The patriots turned his home into a barracks. In Boston, Nutting built barracks and other fortifications under Colonel Cleaveland. He became to acting Lieutenant of the Cambridge company.

Six weeks before evacuation day, under the orders of Captain Spry he went to Halifax with his wife, six children. He became the Master Carpenter and Superintendent of Mechanics. He participated in the failed attack on Machias.

=== New Ireland ===
He returned to England and was appointed the Chief Overseer of His Majesty’s works at Landguard Fort, which was under the direction of Lord Towshend. Through this work, he came to know William Knox. Knox was committed to planting British forces on the coast of Maine, to protect the Bay of Fundy and the coast of Nova Scotia. It would also form the nucleus and bulwark for a new province for loyalists.

He was sent from London to rebuild the Fort at Penobscot. En route to Penobscot, Nutting travelled on the Harriet to Penobscot under the command of Sampson Sprague. En route they were attacked by the much larger American brigantine Vengeance, under the command of Wingate Newman. Of the 45 men on the Harriet, one man killed and six wounded, including Nutting. He was taken prisoner to A Coruña, Spain. He was later returned to England.

The following year, 1779, he embarked again to help establish New Ireland. He served as Brig. General McLean’s pilot. The Penobscot Expedition arrived, which included the Vengeance. His choices of Penobscot was disapproved of by many officers including Collier. At the same time, McLean praised his efforts in the 21 day siege: Nutting “served under my Command on the Expedition to Penobscot much to my satisfaction, on my taking post there. I appointed him Overseer of Works, which duty he performed with Zeal and fidelity to the King’s service." For 1779-1780, Nutting cared for his own land at Castine, where his family joined him after the siege.

Nutting returned to London to advocate for support for New Ireland. He was caught in the Gordon Riots on 2 June 1780 and was detained. He was then ordered by Lord Townsend to proceed to Landguard Fort. Nutting also requested 394 pounds to cover his expenses, of which he received 150.

In 1782, Nutting was sent back to New York to work with Guy Carleton. Carleton ordered him to Halifax to oversee the building of homes for the arriving Loyalists. He was given 2000 acres of land (double of that granted to field officers) that stretched from the Avon River to the Tennecape River. He became the Surveyor of Lumber for the King in the colony as he had been in Penobscot.

== Family ==
His father was the armorer of the Man of war Prince of Orange in the early 1740s. His brother James was a patriot mariner. During the Revolution he was captured by the British brig Ruby and confined in a prison ship at St. Lucia. He escaped in the night and overtook a crew and sailed away with 10 other prisoners. His brother Samuel was a patriot and served as a surgeon aboard the Independence and Rhodes throughout the Revolution.

His wife Mary Walton died about 1831 and was buried at Loyal Hill, property belonging to John Robert Grant, a loyalist who fought beside Nutting at Ticonderoga in the French and Indian War.

== Legacy ==
- He was granted Walton, Nova Scotia, which is named after his son James Walton Nutting (who was named after his mother Mary Walton)
