= David Phips =

American-born British military officer, politician and sheriff (1724–1811)

Sheriff of Middlesex County
- In office 1764–1775
- Preceded by: Richard Foster, Jr.
- Succeeded by: James Prescott

Personal details
- Born: September 25, 1724 Cambridge, Massachusetts
- Died: July 7, 1811 (aged 86) Bath, Somerset
- Spouse(s): Mary Greenleaf (m. 13 Sep 1753)
- Children: 7

Military service
- Allegiance: Massachusetts; Great Britain
- Branch/service: Massachusetts Militia
- Rank: Colonel (Massachusetts Militia); Master and commander (Royal Navy)
- Unit: Governors Troop of Horse Guards
- Battles/wars: King George's War; Siege of Louisbourg (1745); French and Indian War; American Revolutionary War; Powder Alarm; Siege of Boston

David Phips was an American-born British military officer, politician and sheriff who served as the sheriff of Middlesex County, Massachusetts from 1764 to 1775. He is best known for his involvement during the Powder Alarm of 1775, where he was tasked by British General Thomas Gage, the military governor of Massachusetts, to retrieve the keys to a powderhouse from William Brattle.

== Life ==
David Phips was born on September 25, 1724 in Cambridge, Massachusetts, the only son of Massachusetts Governor Spencer Phips and his wife Elizabeth Hutchinson. Phips graduated from Harvard College in 1741 with a Bachelor of Arts, and in 1744 he received his alma mater. Shortly after graduation, Phips received a commission in the Massachusetts Militia during King George's War, and he was a captain during the siege of Louisbourg in 1745. When the war ended in 1748, Phips was appointed a justice of the peace for Middlesex County, Massachusetts and in 1753, he served a single term in the Massachusetts House of Representatives. Phips later returned to military service and he took part during the French and Indian War.

War concluded in 1763, and one year later in 1764, Phips was appointed high sheriff of Middlesex County, and anointed colonel of the Governors Troop of Horse Guards in 1773, formerly commanded by his father. On July 12, Phips wrote a letter to Colonel Jonathan Snelling, informing him that Massachusetts Governor Thomas Hutchinson had requested the accompaniment of guards during his travels from Milton to Cambridge on July 21, 1773, to attend the Harvard College Commencement exercises.

Amidst growing tension between Great Britain and it's American colonies, Phips was dispatched on August 31, 1774 to William Brattle under orders of Governor Thomas Gage to remove the provincial powder; Brattle turned the key to the powder house over to Phips. Gage also gave orders to ready a force of troops for action the next day, something that did not go unnoticed by the local population. At some point that day, General Gage, whether by his intent, accident, or theft by a messenger, lost possession of the August 27 letter from William Brattle; the widely held story is that it was dropped. News of its content spread rapidly, and many considered it to be a warning to Gage to remove the provincial powder before Patriots could seize it.

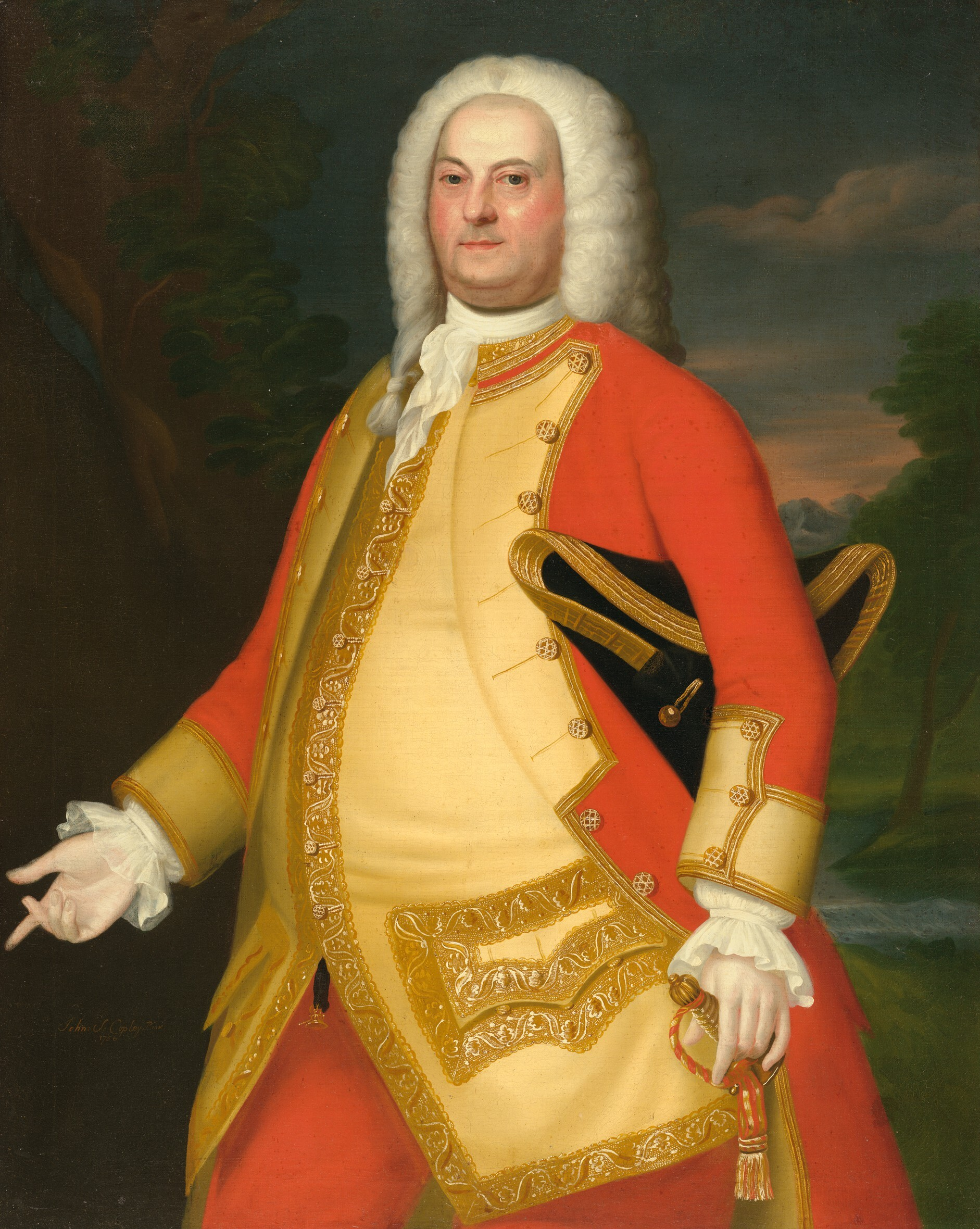
1756 portrait of Brattle by John Singleton Copley

Early in the morning of September 1, roughly 260 troops of the British Army's 4th Regiment of Foot under Lieutenant-Colonel George Maddison rowed in secrecy up the Mystic River from Boston to a landing point near Winter Hill in modern-day Somerville. From there they marched about a mile (1.6 km) to the Powder House, a gunpowder magazine that held the largest supply of gunpowder in Massachusetts. Phips gave the troops the keys to the building, and after sunrise, they removed all of the gunpowder. Most of the soldiers then returned to Boston the way they had come, but a small contingent marched to Cambridge, removed two field guns, and took them to Boston by foot over the Great Bridge and up Boston Neck. The field guns and powder were then taken from Boston to the British stronghold on Castle Island, then known as Castle William (renamed Fort Independence in 1779).

In the aftermath of the raid, false rumors flew throughout the day across the countryside about the British troop movements. The soldiers were marching; provincial powder had been seized; war was at hand; people had been killed; Boston was being bombarded by the Royal Navy. The alarm spread as far as Connecticut. From all over the region, people took up arms and began streaming toward Boston. On September 2, several thousand men bent on violence gathered in Cambridge, where they forced several notable Loyalists, including Brattle, to flee to Boston and the protection of the British military. Phips was forced, in writing, to dissociate himself from any and all government actions. Eventually facts caught up with the rumors, and militia units (some of which were still heading toward Boston) returned home.

With the outbreak of the American Revolutionary War in 1775, Phips was forced to abandon his office, fleeing to Boston with 11 members of his family, joining Gage, where the city was besieged by American forces. The siege was broken in March 1776 when Continental Army Colonel Henry Knox brought heavy artillery from Fort Ticonderoga to Boston during the winter, and the Continental Commander in Chief, General Washington used them to fortify Dorchester Heights, overlooking Boston and its harbour. On 17 March, governor William Howe evacuated the city, with British troops, and many Loyalists including Phips sailing for Halifax, Nova Scotia.

In 1778, Phips was proscribed and his estates confiscated by the new administration in Boston, by the implementation of the Banishment Act of the State of Massachusetts. His wife and he are mentioned in the will of his sister-in-law, Abigail Howard. Phips, there after was commissioned a lieutenant in the Royal Navy, eventually being promoted to master and commander. In 1782, his ship was captured by the French, and he was held captive in Boston. David's estate, in 1782, made a claim for £400 compensation by his removal from Massachusetts as a loyalist. In which, it lists a number of relatives and others; he was released seven months later, and he left with his family for England. Phips died in Bath, Somerset on July 7, 1811, aged 87; his death was announced in Massachusetts via the Columbian Centinel, published on 19 October 1811. His death in his home in Pierrepoint Street, Bath was gazetted in the Globe and the London Chronicle and in provincial newspapers.

== Personal life ==
Phips married Mary Greenleaf on September 13, 1753. They had seven children. Mary Greenleaf died in 1814 in Bath, England.

1. Mary Phips (1757-)
2. Spencer Phips (1760-)
3. Sarah Phips (1762-)
4. Rebecca Phips (1763-)
5. William Phips (1764-)
6. Stephen Greenleaf Phips (1767-)
7. Elizabeth Hutchinson (Phips) Phipps (1770-1848)

Phips was the Warden of Christ Church, Boston in 1762, 1764 and 1774.
