= Andrew Oliver =

American-born merchant and colonial administrator

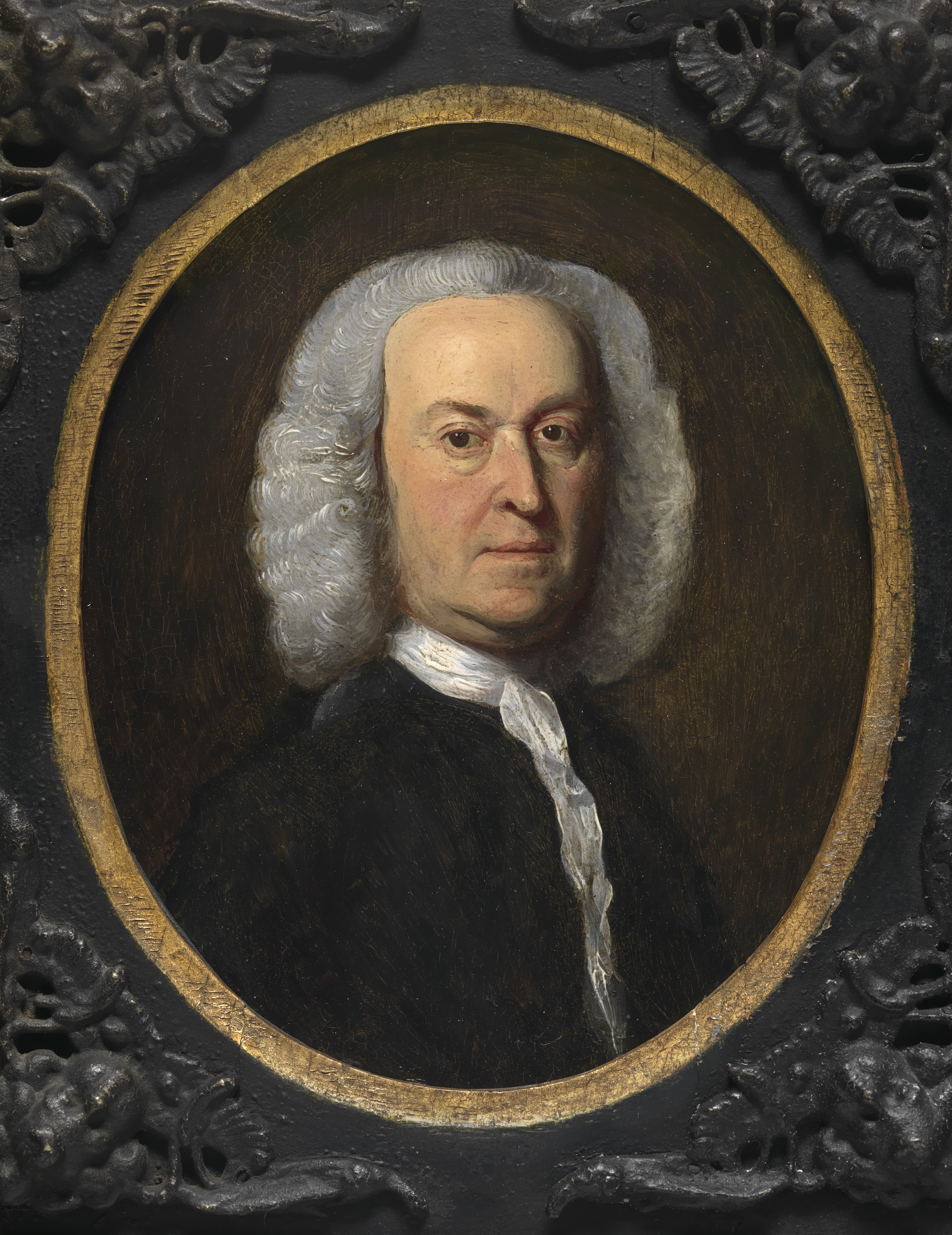
- Portrait c. 1758 by John Singleton Copley

Lieutenant Governor of the Province of Massachusetts Bay
- In office March 14, 1771 – March 3, 1774
- Preceded by: Thomas Hutchinson
- Succeeded by: Thomas Oliver

Personal details
- Born: March 28, 1706 Boston, Massachusetts Bay Colony
- Died: March 3, 1774 (aged 67) Boston
- Spouse(s): Mary Fitch; Mary Sanford
- Profession: Merchant and politician

Andrew Oliver (March 28, 1706 – March 3, 1774) was an American-born merchant and colonial administrator in the Province of Massachusetts Bay. Born into a wealthy and politically powerful merchant family, he is best known as the official responsible for implementing the provisions of the Stamp Act, for which he was hanged in effigy. He never actually carried out those duties and was later commissioned as the province's lieutenant governor.

== Early life ==
Coat of Arms of Andrew Oliver

Andrew Oliver was born in Boston, capital of the British Province of Massachusetts Bay, on March 28, 1706. His father, Daniel Oliver, was a wealthy and politically active merchant, and his mother, Elizabeth Belcher Oliver, was the sister of Jonathan Belcher, son of another wealthy merchant and governor of the province in the 1730s. Andrew had two brothers: Daniel Oliver (1704–1727) and Peter Oliver (1713–1791). Characterized as "sober and pious", Andrew was sent to Harvard College, where he graduated in 1724.

Oliver then entered the family business, setting up a merchant business with his brother Peter that concentrated on wine and textiles. The business was successful, and the brothers eventually controlled Boston's Long Wharf. On March 20, 1728, Oliver married Mary Fitch, the daughter of Colonel Thomas Fitch. The couple had three children before Mary died in 1732; only one, a son named Andrew, survived to adulthood. After Mary's death Oliver traveled to England, returning to Massachusetts in 1734. On December 19, 1734, he married Mary Sanford of Newport, Rhode Island, the sister-in-law of Thomas Hutchinson. The couple had fourteen children.

== Politics and the Stamp Act ==
In 1737, Oliver entered politics and won election as Boston's town auditor. He held many other local offices, and became a leader of the Hutchinson-Oliver faction, which dominated politics in colonial Massachusetts. He was elected to the provincial assembly in 1742 and in 1755 was appointed provincial secretary by Acting Governor Spencer Phips.

In 1765, Oliver was commissioned to administer the unpopular Stamp Act in Massachusetts. He was privately against the act but told people that he was in favor of it, which led colonists to rise against him. On August 14, he was hanged in effigy from Boston's Liberty Tree in a protest organized by the Loyal Nine, a precursor to the Sons of Liberty. That night, his house and offices were ransacked by an angry crowd. On August 17, he was compelled to publicly resign his commission. On December 17, the Sons of Liberty again forced him to swear publicly that he would never act as stamp distributor.

== Later career ==
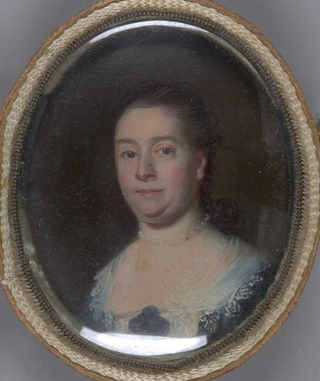
Mrs. Andrew Oliver (Mary Sanford) (1713–1773)

He was commissioned lieutenant governor of the colony when his brother-in-law Thomas Hutchinson became governor in 1771. Letters that he and Hutchinson had written in the late 1760s during the protests surrounding the Townshend Acts were published in 1773 and ignited a storm of protest against both men. The business took a serious toll on Oliver's health, which suffered further after his wife had died.

Oliver died on March 3, 1774, after he had suffered from an "apoplectick fit." His death was greeted with glee by the Sons of Liberty, and his burial was marred by acts of protest and violence. Because of the charged political climate, few friends and relatives attended.

Most of Oliver's family joined the Loyalists during the American Revolution and its success caused them to resettle to other parts of the British Empire.

== Notes ==
Political offices
Preceded by Josiah Willard	Secretary of the Province of Massachusetts Bay; December 15, 1756 – March 11, 1771	Succeeded by Thomas Flucker
Preceded by Thomas Hutchinson	Lieutenant-Governor of the Province of Massachusetts Bay; March 14, 1771 – March 3, 1774	Succeeded by Thomas Oliver
