= Powder Alarm =

1774 event leading up to the Revolutionary War

- Part of the American Revolution
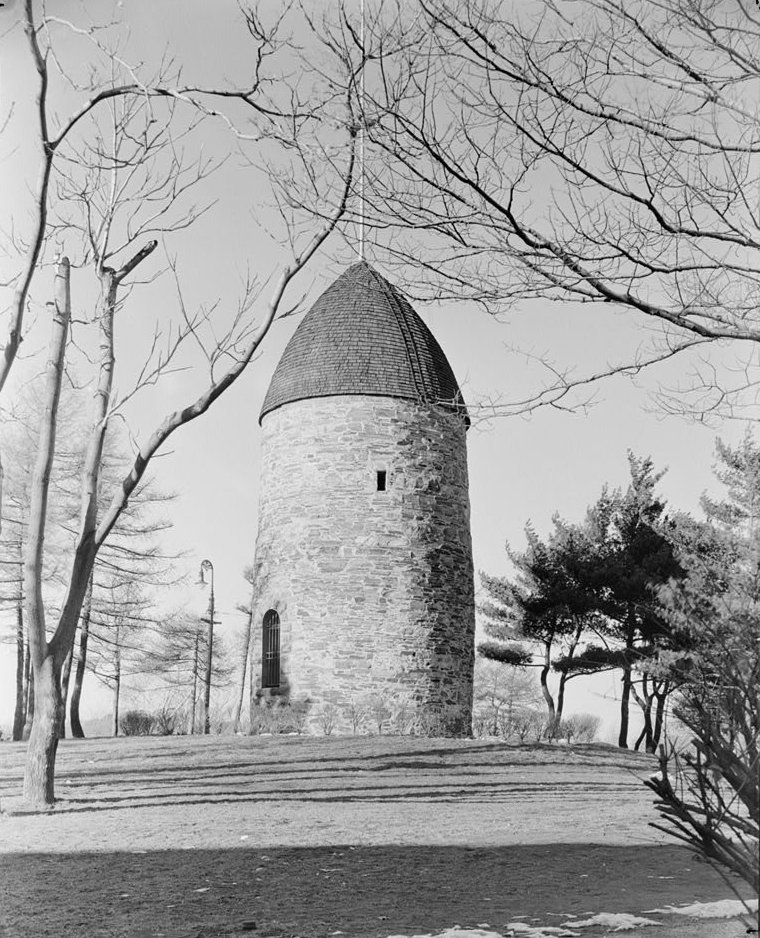
- The Old Powder House in Somerville, Massachusetts, as it stood in 1935, atop the hill at Nathan Tufts Park overlooking Powder House Square
- Date: September 1, 1774 (251 years ago)
- Location: Suffolk County, Province of Massachusetts Bay, British America
- Result: British soldiers remove military supplies

Parties
Massachusetts Bay Committee of safety	Kingdom of Great Britain: British Army

Lead figures
Paul Revere	Thomas Gage; William Brattle; George Maddison; David Phips

Number
Disputed	260 regulars, from the 4th regiment of foot

The Powder Alarm was a major popular reaction to the removal of gunpowder from a gunpowder magazine near Boston by British troops under orders from General Thomas Gage, governor of the Province of Massachusetts Bay, on September 1, 1774. In response to this action, amid false rumors that blood had been shed, alarm spread through the countryside to Connecticut and beyond, and local Patriots formed themselves into armed mobs, fearing that war was at hand. Thousands of militiamen began streaming toward Boston and Cambridge, and mob action forced Loyalists and some government officials to flee to the protection of the British Army. A similar event, known as Gunpowder Incident, occurred in Virginia in April, 1775.

Although it proved to be a false alarm, the incident caused political and military leaders to proceed more carefully in the days ahead, and essentially provided a "dress rehearsal" for the Battles of Lexington and Concord seven and a half months later. Furthermore, actions on both sides to control weaponry, gunpowder, and other military supplies became more contentious, as the British sought to bring military stores more directly under their control, and the Patriot colonists sought to acquire them for their own use.

== Background ==
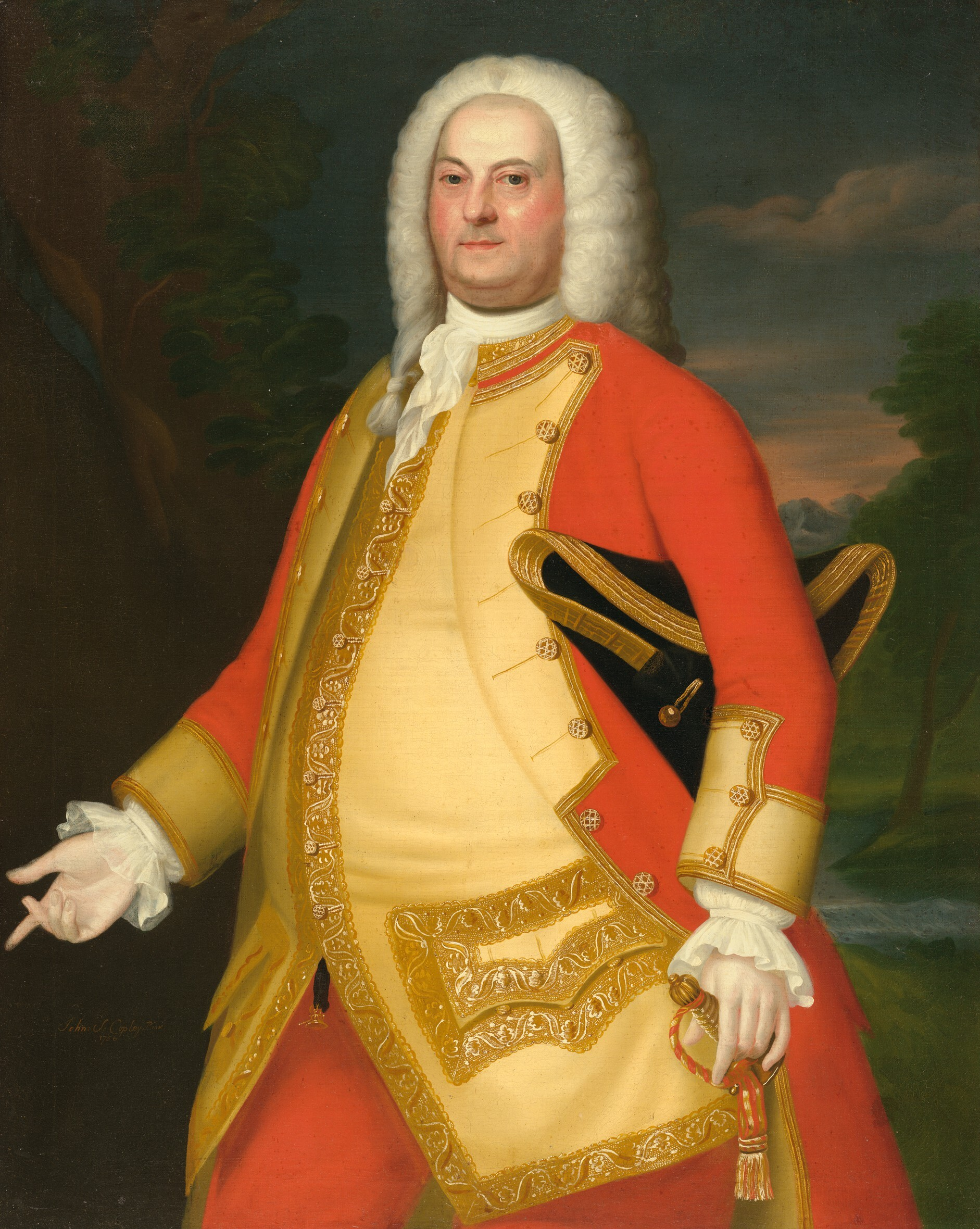
William Brattle, who played a major role in the incident

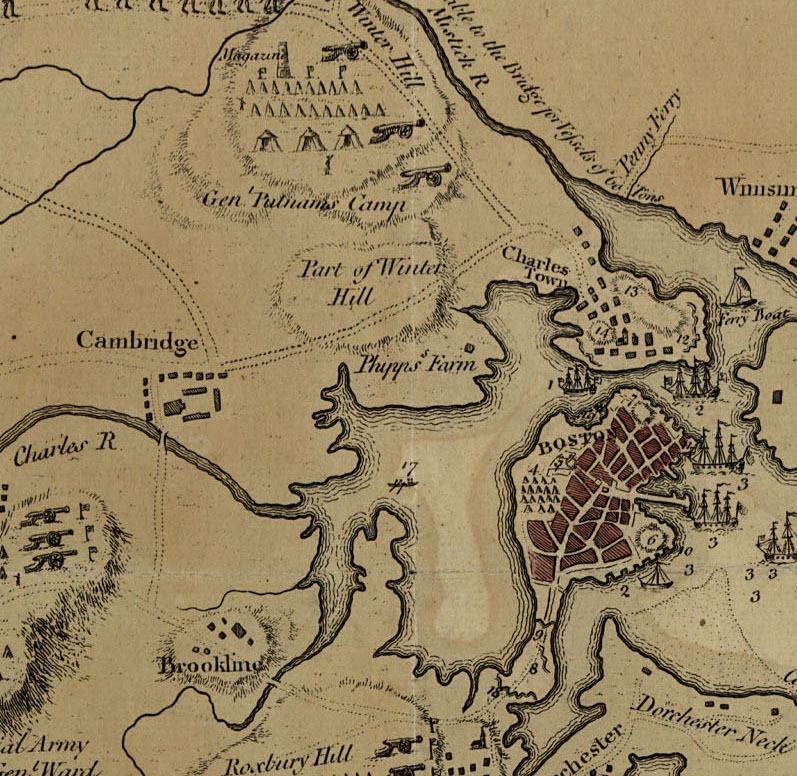
The Powder House ("Magazine") is near the northern edge of this detail from a 1775 map of the siege of Boston.

In 1772, many of the thirteen British colonies, in response to unpopular British actions and the negative British reaction to the Gaspee Affair (the destruction by colonists of a grounded ship involved in enforcing customs regulations), elected to form Committees of Correspondence. These allowed communities to formally communicate with each other, raise awareness of incidents occurring elsewhere, and to coordinate actions; as such, they became instrumental in managing the colonial response to enforcement of the Tea Act, the Intolerable Acts, and other unpopular British colonial legislation. The colonists of Massachusetts had not yet taken concerted action to organize themselves militarily against actions of the British regulars, although statements were made about supporting Boston (whose port had been closed earlier in 1774 under the Boston Port Act) "at the risque of our lives and fortunes."

General Thomas Gage, who had become the military governor of Massachusetts in May 1774, was charged with enforcement of the highly unpopular Intolerable Acts, which British Parliament had passed in response to the Boston Tea Party. Seeking to prevent the outbreak of war and to keep the peace between the American Patriot (Whig) majority and the Loyalist (Tory) minority, he believed that the best way to accomplish this was by secretly removing military supplies from storehouses and arsenals in New England. The secrecy of these missions was paramount, as Gage feared that leakage of any plans would result in the seizure or concealment of the stores by Patriot sympathizers before his men got there.

There were several places throughout the colonies where the British army had stockpiled supplies. Some of these places were fortifications that were manned by small garrisons; others were merely locked magazines. Most of the powder in these was under the control of the provincial government, though some was the property of individual towns. One locked storehouse near Boston, in what was then part of Charlestown, now Powder House Square in Somerville, was controlled by William Brattle, the leader of the provincial militia and an appointee of the governor. Brattle, who had not obviously sided with either Loyalists or Patriots, notified Governor Gage in a letter dated August 27 that the provincial ("King's") powder was the only supply remaining in that storehouse, as the towns had removed all of theirs. Gage decided that this powder had to be brought to Boston for safekeeping.

== Expedition ==
On August 31, Gage sent the sheriff of Middlesex County, David Phips, to Brattle with orders to remove the provincial powder; Brattle turned the key to the powder house over to Phips. Gage also gave orders to ready a force of troops for action the next day, something that did not go unnoticed by the local population. At some point that day, General Gage, whether by his intent, accident, or theft by a messenger, lost possession of the August 27 letter from William Brattle; the widely held story is that it was dropped. News of its content spread rapidly, and many considered it to be a warning to Gage to remove the provincial powder before Patriots could seize it.

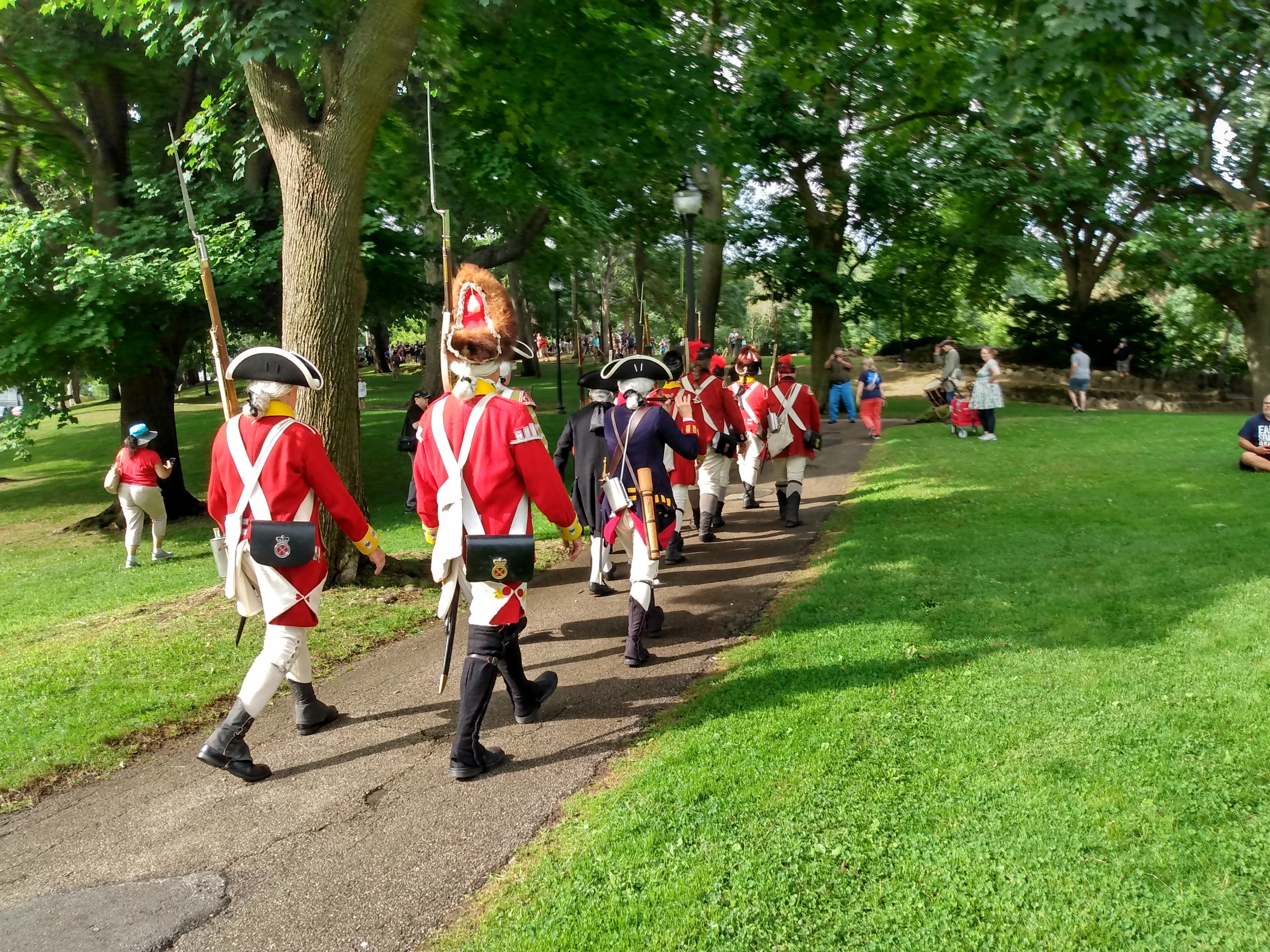
Re-enactors portraying the 4th Regiment of Foot marching to the Powder House for the 250th anniversary commemoration, September 2024

Early in the morning of September 1, a force of roughly 260 British regulars from the 4th Regiment, under the command of Lieutenant Colonel George Maddison, was rowed in secrecy up the Mystic River from Boston to a landing point near Winter Hill in modern-day Somerville. From there they marched about a mile (1.6 km) to the Powder House, a gunpowder magazine that held the largest supply of gunpowder in Massachusetts. Phips gave the King's Troops the keys to the building, and after sunrise, they removed all of the gunpowder. Most of the regulars then returned to Boston the way they had come, but a small contingent marched to Cambridge, removed two field pieces, and took them to Boston by foot over the Great Bridge and up Boston Neck. The field pieces and powder were then taken from Boston to the British stronghold on Castle Island, then known as Castle William (renamed Fort Independence in 1779).

== Response to the raid ==
False rumors flew throughout the day across the countryside about the British troop movements. The regulars were marching; provincial powder had been seized; war was at hand; people had been killed; Boston was being bombarded by His Majesty's warships. The alarm spread as far as Connecticut. From all over the region, people took up arms and began streaming toward Boston. One traveler in Shrewsbury reported that in the space of 15 minutes, 50 men had gathered, equipped themselves, sent out messengers to surrounding towns, and left for Boston. On September 2, several thousand men bent on violence gathered in Cambridge, where they forced several notable Loyalists, including William Brattle, to flee to Boston and the protection of the military. Sheriff Phips was forced, in writing, to dissociate himself from any and all government actions. Eventually facts caught up with the rumors, and militia units (some of which were still heading toward Boston) returned home.

Also on September 2, Boston newspapers published a letter from William Brattle in which he protested that he had not warned Gage to remove the powder; Gage had requested from him an accounting of the storehouse's contents, and he had complied. The content of his letter to Gage would be published on September 5. Brattle remained on Castle Island through the siege of Boston, leaving when the British evacuated the city in March 1776. He died in Halifax, Nova Scotia, in October 1776 at the age of 70.

When the horrid news was brought here of the bombardment of Boston, which made us completely miserable for two days, we saw proofs of both the sympathy and the resolution of the continent. War! war! war! was the cry, and it was pronounced in a tone which would have done honor to the oratory of a Briton or a Roman. If it had proved true, you would have heard the thunder of an American Congress.

— John Adams, reporting on the reaction of the First Continental Congress in Philadelphia

== British reaction ==
Gage, surprised by the size and scope of the colonial reaction, delayed and eventually cancelled a second planned expedition to the storehouse in Worcester. He concentrated his troops in Boston, and called for reinforcements from London, writing "if you think ten thousand men sufficient, send twenty; if one million is thought enough, give two; you save both blood and treasure in the end." However, Gage's request was seen by some in London as absurd, as there were only 12,000 troops in Britain at the time, but he did eventually receive an additional 400 Marines in response to these requests. He later began planning and executing seizures again, and he further fortified the Boston peninsula.

== Colonial reaction ==
A 2007 photograph of the Old Powder House in Nathan Tufts Park, Somerville, Massachusetts

After the Powder Alarm, militia forces throughout New England were more cautious with their supplies and more intent on gaining information about Gage's plans and troop movements. Paul Revere played a significant role in distributing this information because of his geographical position in Boston, his social position as a middle-class craftsman in contact with all social classes, and his political position as a well-known Patriot propagandist and organizer.

=== The colonists organize ===
On September 21, Patriot leaders met in Worcester and urged town meetings to organize a third of the militias into special companies of minutemen in constant readiness to march. They also instituted the system of express riders and alarms that would prove to be critical at Lexington and Concord. In October, the former legislature of Massachusetts met in defiance of the Massachusetts Government Act and declared itself to be the First Provincial Congress. It created a Committee of Safety modeled after a body with the same name during the English Civil War and it recommended that a quarter of the militia be designated as minutemen. Military stores were to be stockpiled away from the coast (more than a convenient day's march), to make attempts to seize them more difficult. The largest stockpiles were located at Concord and Worcester.

=== Portsmouth Alarm ===
Early in December 1774, British military command voted to prohibit the export of arms and powder to North America and to secure all remaining stores. On December 12, intelligence received by Paul Revere indicated that a seizure of stores at Fort William and Mary in Portsmouth, New Hampshire, was imminent. He rode from Boston to Portsmouth the next day to notify the local Patriots, who quickly raided the fort on December 14 and removed its supplies. Revere's intelligence had been incorrect; although a British operation had been contemplated, it had not been ordered. The British did send ships carrying troops to Portsmouth, and they arrived three days after the fort's supplies were removed. The first arrived on December 17 and was directed into shallows at high tide by a local Patriot pilot, much to the captain's anger.

Stores of gunpowder—typically referred to by Loyalists as "the King's powder" but by Patriots as "the militia's powder"—were also carried off from forts in Newport, Rhode Island, Providence, Rhode Island, and New London, Connecticut, and distributed to the militias in towns away from the coast. Cannon and other supplies were smuggled out of Boston and Charlestown.

=== Salem confrontation ===
On February 27, 1775, HMS Lively brought a force of about 240 British regulars from the 64th Regiment under Colonel Alexander Leslie to confiscate weapons in Salem, Massachusetts. They were stopped by a small crowd that raised a drawbridge in their path and taunted them while others moved the cannon to safety and sent for help from nearby towns. Eventually, the drawbridge was lowered and the regulars were permitted to search the forge where the cannon had once been. They returned to their ship while being mocked by a growing force of irregulars marching along in lock-step next to them. There were minor scuffles, but no shots were fired.

== See also ==
- Gunpowder Incident—a similar event in Virginia
