= Powder House Square =

- Powder House Park
- U.S. National Register of Historic Places
- U.S. Historic district
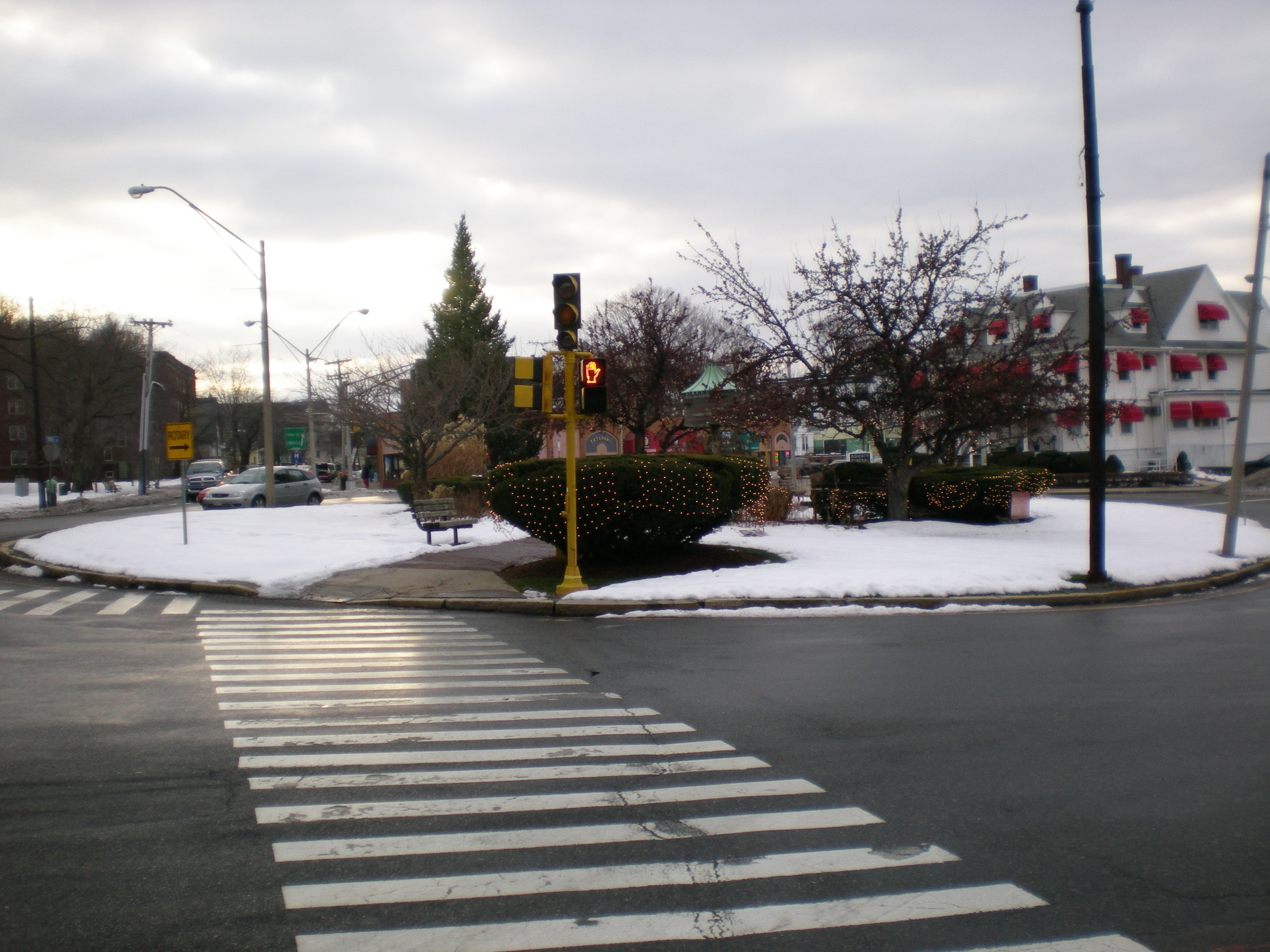
- View of the Powder House Square rotary from Warner Street

- Location within Massachusetts Location within the United States
- Location: Somerville, Massachusetts, United States
- Coordinates: 42°24′00″N 71°06′58″W
- NRHP reference No.: 75000287
- Added to NRHP: May 21, 1975

Powder House Square is a neighborhood and landmark rotary in Somerville, Massachusetts, United States. It is also known locally as Powder House Circle. It is the six-way intersection of College Avenue, Broadway, Warner Street, and Powder House Boulevard. Powder House Square stands at the southern tip of Tufts University's main Somerville/Medford campus, and borders the northern edge of Nathan Tufts Park. The square takes its name from the 18th century Powder House, which overlooks the rotary from Nathan Tufts Park.

Powder House Square was home to one of the first hostile acts of the American Revolution. The removal of colonial gunpowder by British soldiers, and the massive popular reaction known as Powder Alarm that ensued, are considered to be a turning point in the events leading up to war.

== History ==
Broadway was one of the earliest highways running through what would later become Somerville, originating in the 17th century. Originally called "Menotomie's Road," it ran from Charlestown to the settlement at Menotomy (present-day Arlington).

Powder House Boulevard was created in 1900, extending northwest from Broadway at Nathan Tufts Park. According to a plaque placed at the center of the rotary island, the circle was dedicated in 1940 as the James A. Reynolds Traffic Circle, in honor of a Tufts College professor.

=== Old Powder House ===
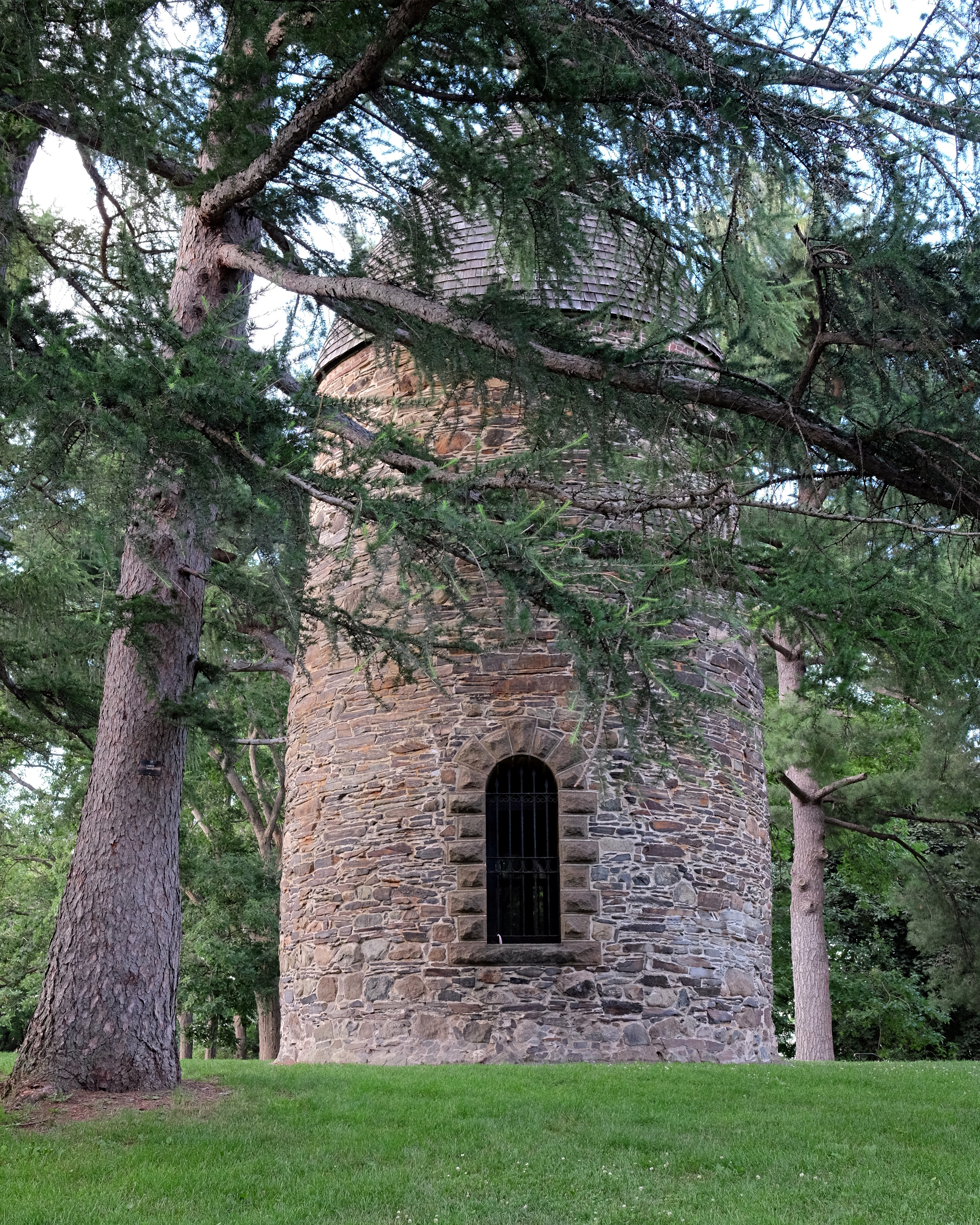
Somerville's Old Powder House as it appeared in 2015

First built for use as a windmill by John Mallet in the early 1703 or 1704, the Old Powder House was sold to the colonial government of Massachusetts for use as a gunpowder magazine in 1747. It is the oldest stone building in Massachusetts. Located at the intersection of Broadway and College Avenue in present-day Powder House Square, the Old Powder House held the largest supply of gunpowder in the colony. General Thomas Gage, who had become the military governor of Massachusetts in May 1774, was charged with enforcement of the highly unpopular Intolerable Acts, which the British Parliament had passed in response to the Boston Tea Party. Seeking to prevent the outbreak of war, he believed that the best way to accomplish this was by secretly removing military stores from storehouses and arsenals in New England.

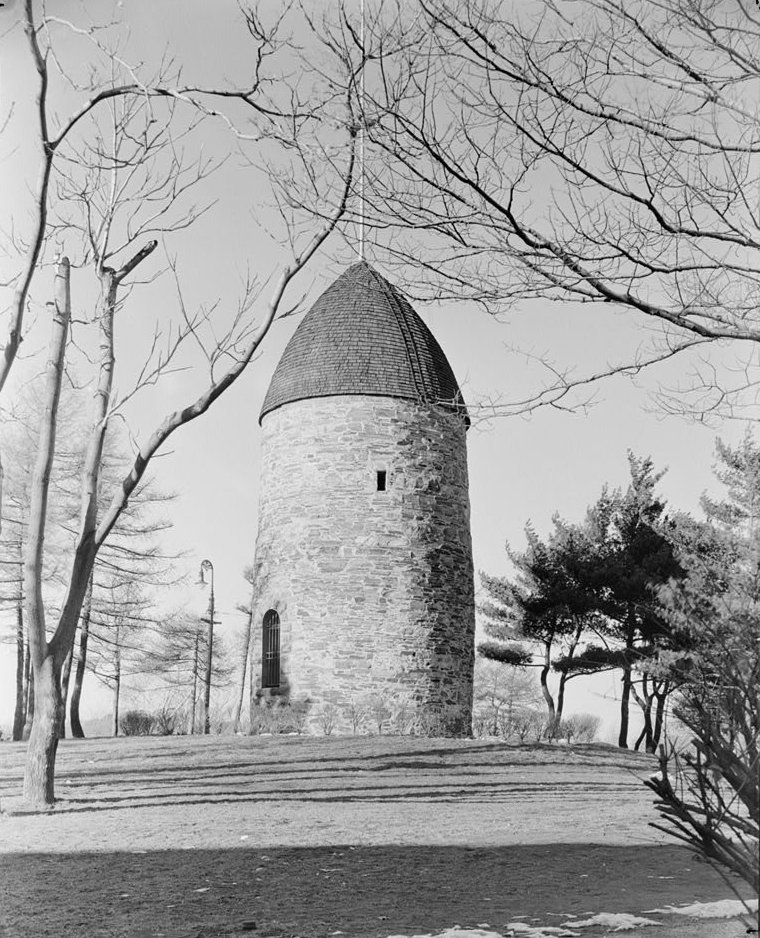
The Old Powder House as it stood in 1935 atop the hill at Nathan Tufts Park, overlooking Powder House Square

=== Powder Alarm ===
Just after dawn on September 1, 1774, a force of roughly 260 British regulars from the 4th Regiment, under the command of Lieutenant Colonel George Maddison, were rowed in secrecy up the Mystic River from Boston to a landing point near Winter Hill. From there they marched about a mile to the Powder House, and after sunrise removed all of the remaining gunpowder, all of which was British-owned. Most of the regulars then returned to Boston the way they had come, but a small contingent marched on to Cambridge, seizing two field pieces from the Cambridge Common. The field pieces and powder were then taken from Boston to the British stronghold on Castle William.

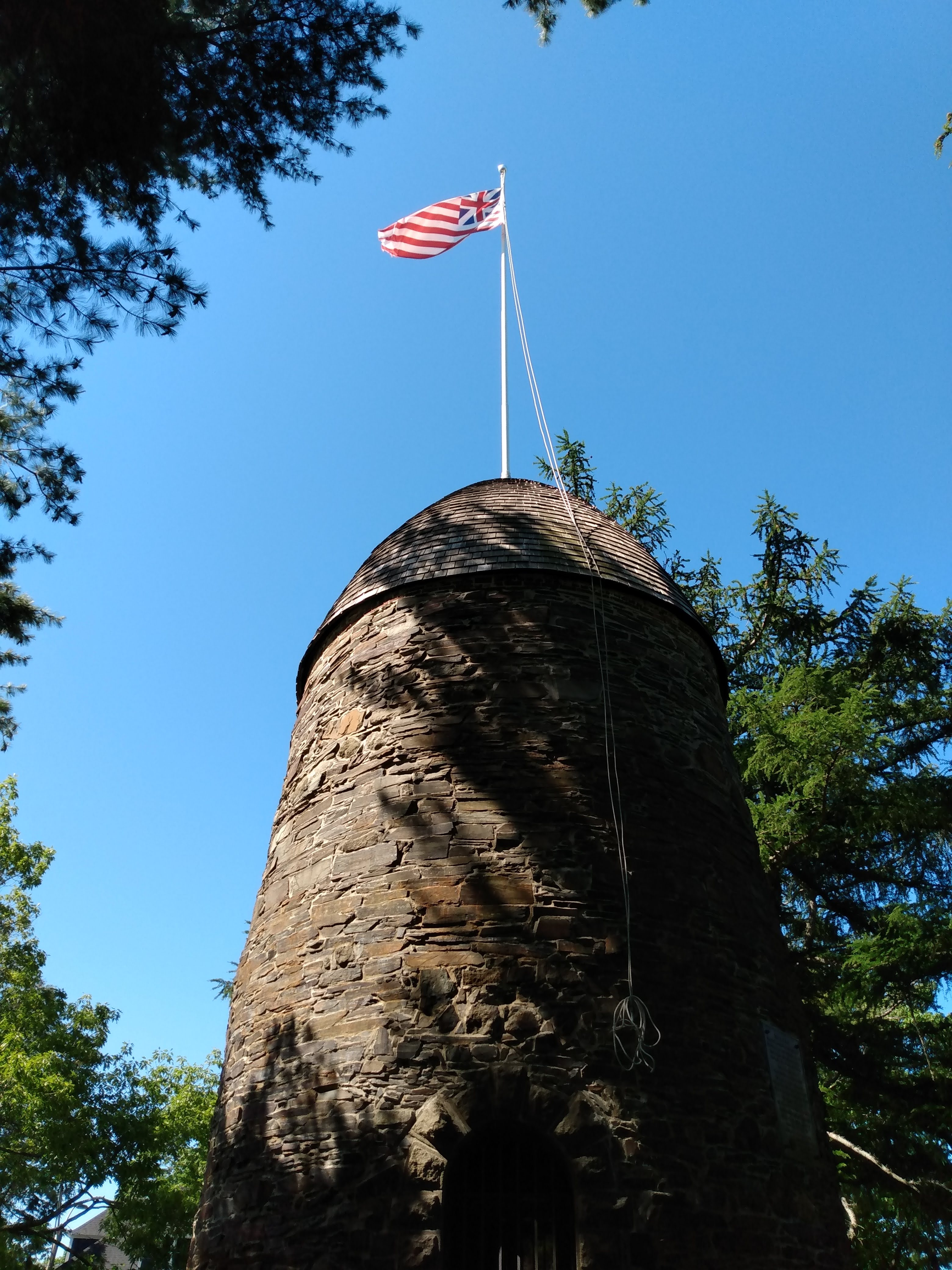
The Grand Union flag flies over the Old Powder House in Somerville MA 2023

In response to the raid, amid false rumors that blood had been shed, alarm spread through the countryside as far as Connecticut and beyond, and local Patriots formed themselves into armed mobs, fearing that war was at hand. Thousands of militiamen began streaming toward Boston and Cambridge, and mob action forced Loyalists and some government officials to flee to the protection of the British Army. This action provided a "dress rehearsal" for the Battles of Lexington and Concord seven months later in the famous "shot heard 'round the world". This did however, inflame already heated feelings on both sides and would spur actions by both the British and Patriots to move both powder and cannons to secure locations.

=== After the Revolutionary War ===
Massachusetts began storing gunpowder elsewhere and sold the land containing the Powder House to Peter Tufts in 1818. The estate, known as the Powder House Farm, was used as a farm and residence for the Tufts family for most of the 19th century, passing to Peter's heir, Nathan Tufts. Incidentally, another Tufts relative Charles Tufts donated the land across Broadway on the Somerville/Medford line to found Tufts College (now Tufts University). The college was founded in 1852, on Walnut Hill slightly to the north of present-day Powder House Square.

In the 1870s, a pickle and condiment manufacturer named George Emerson began making pickles nearby, housing his business in a large shed that he moved to the property from another location in Somerville. The powder house itself, with its two-foot thick stone walls, was well-insulated and made a perfect place for storing Emerson's "Old Powder House Brand" pickles.

The descendants of Nathan Tufts donated the Powder House Farm along with its namesake structure to the city in 1890, and from this Nathan Tufts Park was established in 1893.

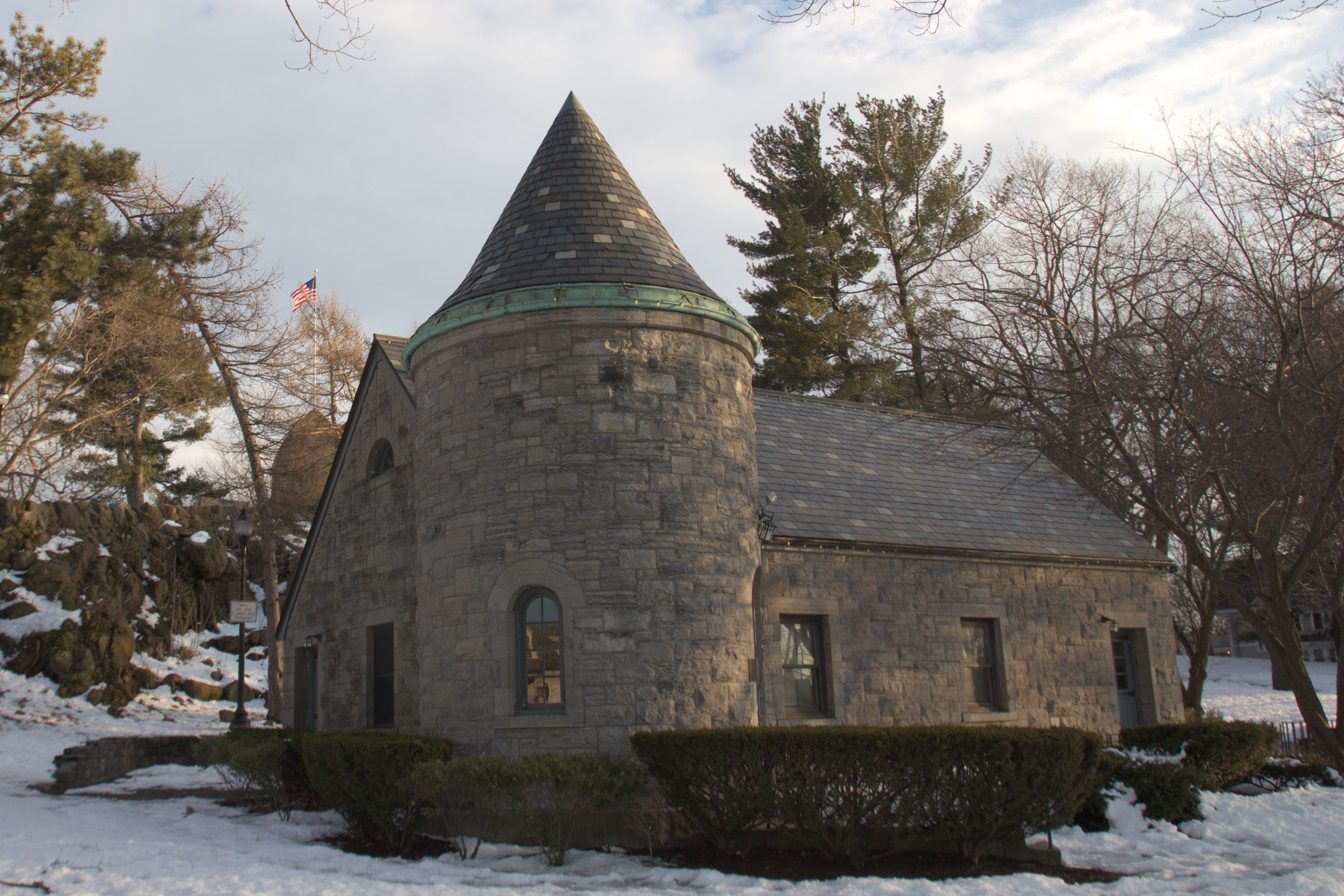
Nathan Tufts Park Field House

The Field House was constructed in 1935-36 using stones from the 1934-demolished Somerville Highlands railroad station, which had closed in 1927 when passenger service on the Fitchburg Cutoff ended. Sponsored by the Federal Relief Administration as a Work Projects Administration Project, it has served many purposes over the years, including as an office for the Draft Board, then for the Traffic and Parking Department, and most recently as a Youth Program center. The building underwent significant repairs and restoration work both inside and outside during 2001–2002, and is now available for public use by petition.

In celebration of its 100th birthday, the City of Somerville (whose seal had previously depicted George Washington) created a new city seal, featuring the Powder House.

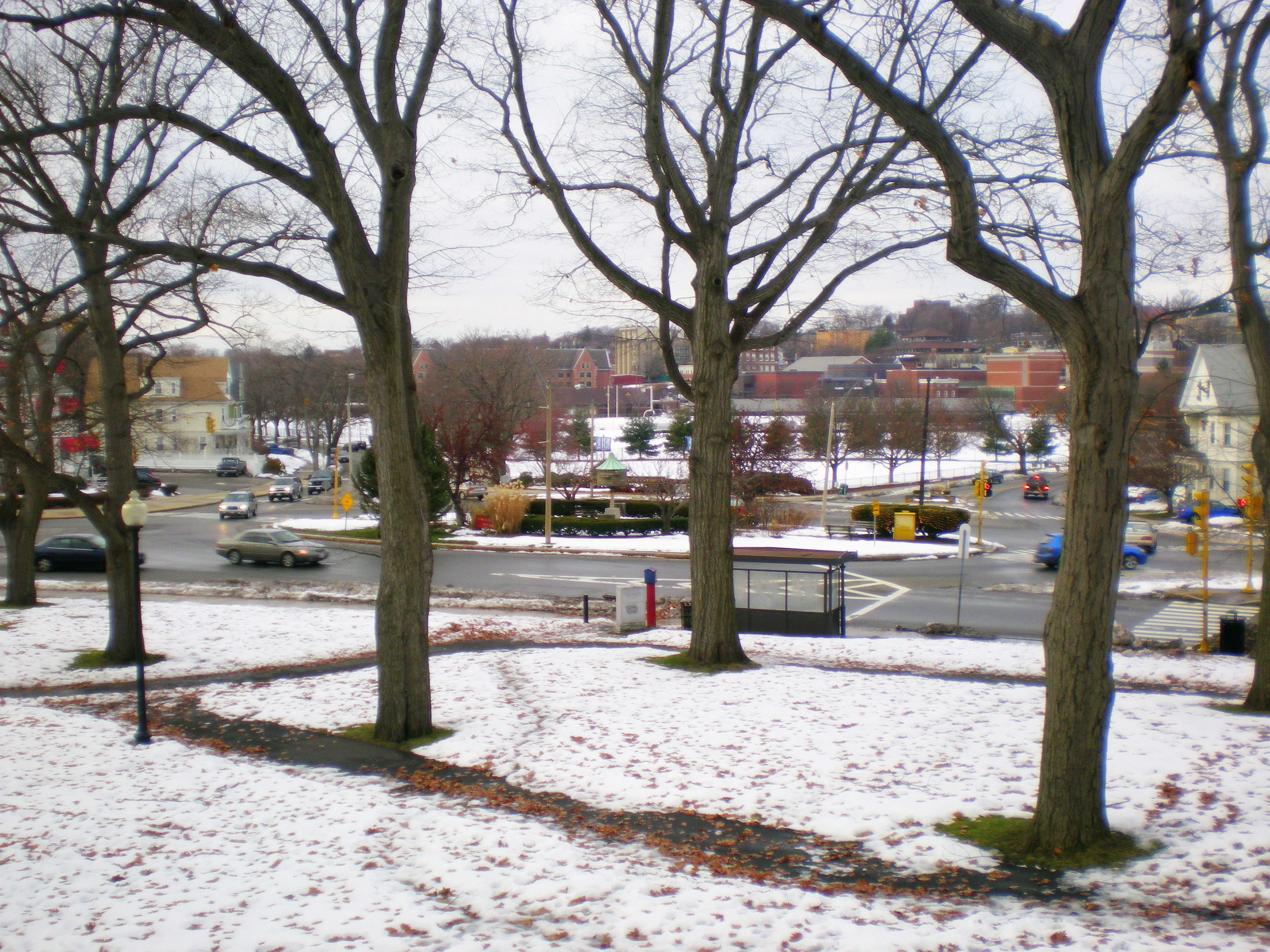
Overlooking Powder House Square from the hill at Nathan Tufts Park. Tufts University is in the background.

Nathan Tufts Park (along with the Powder House) was added to the National Register of Historic Places in 1975, the first of many landmarks in Somerville to be added. The City of Somerville designated the park a local historic district in 1985.

An accidental fire damaged the Powder House in 1998, leading to extensive repairs and renovations in 2000–2001.

=== Powder House Square today ===
Small bronze sculptured monuments can be seen around Nathan Tufts Park referring to the site's past uses as a farm, a mill, storage for gunpowder, and even a pickle factory.

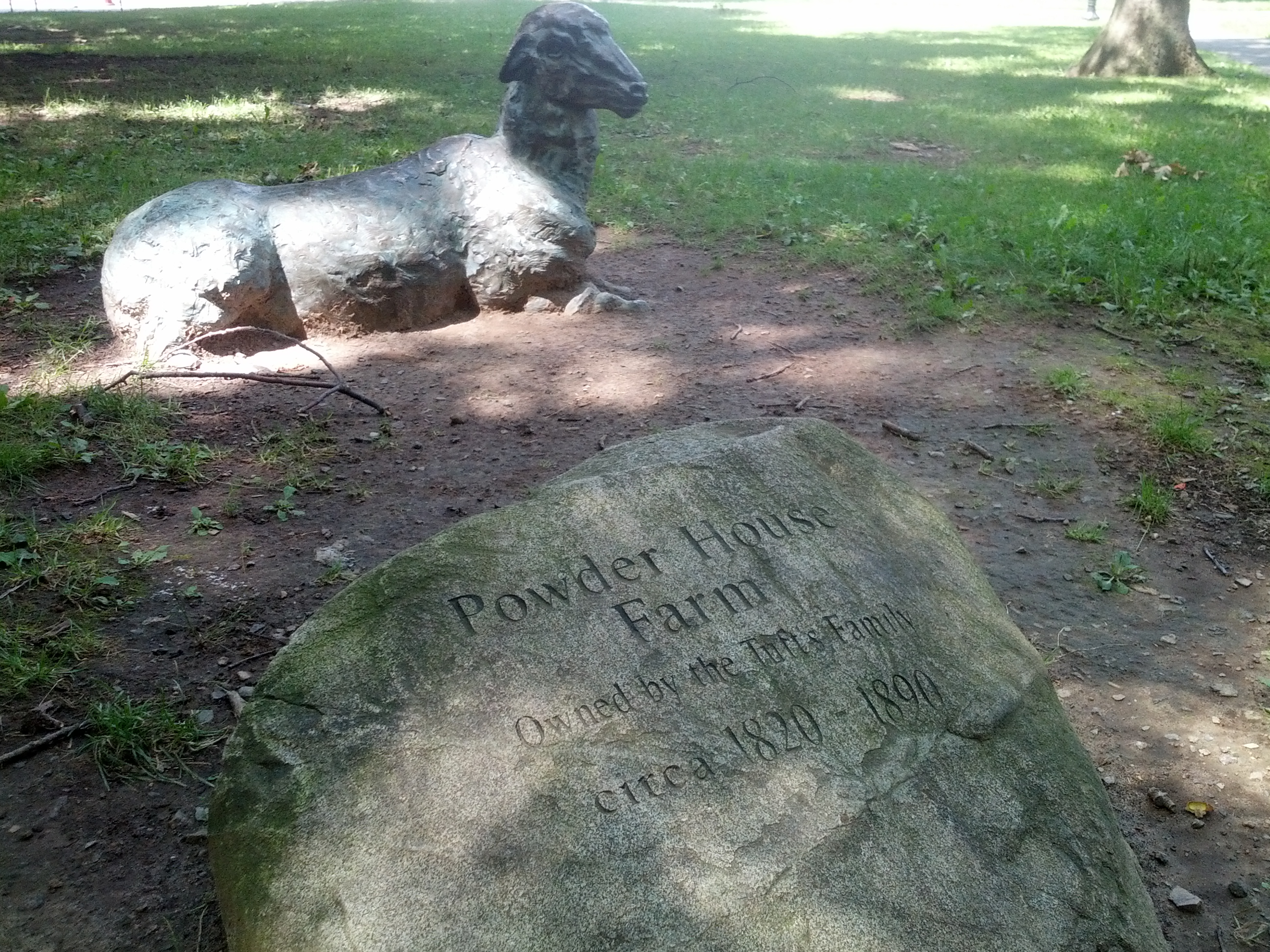

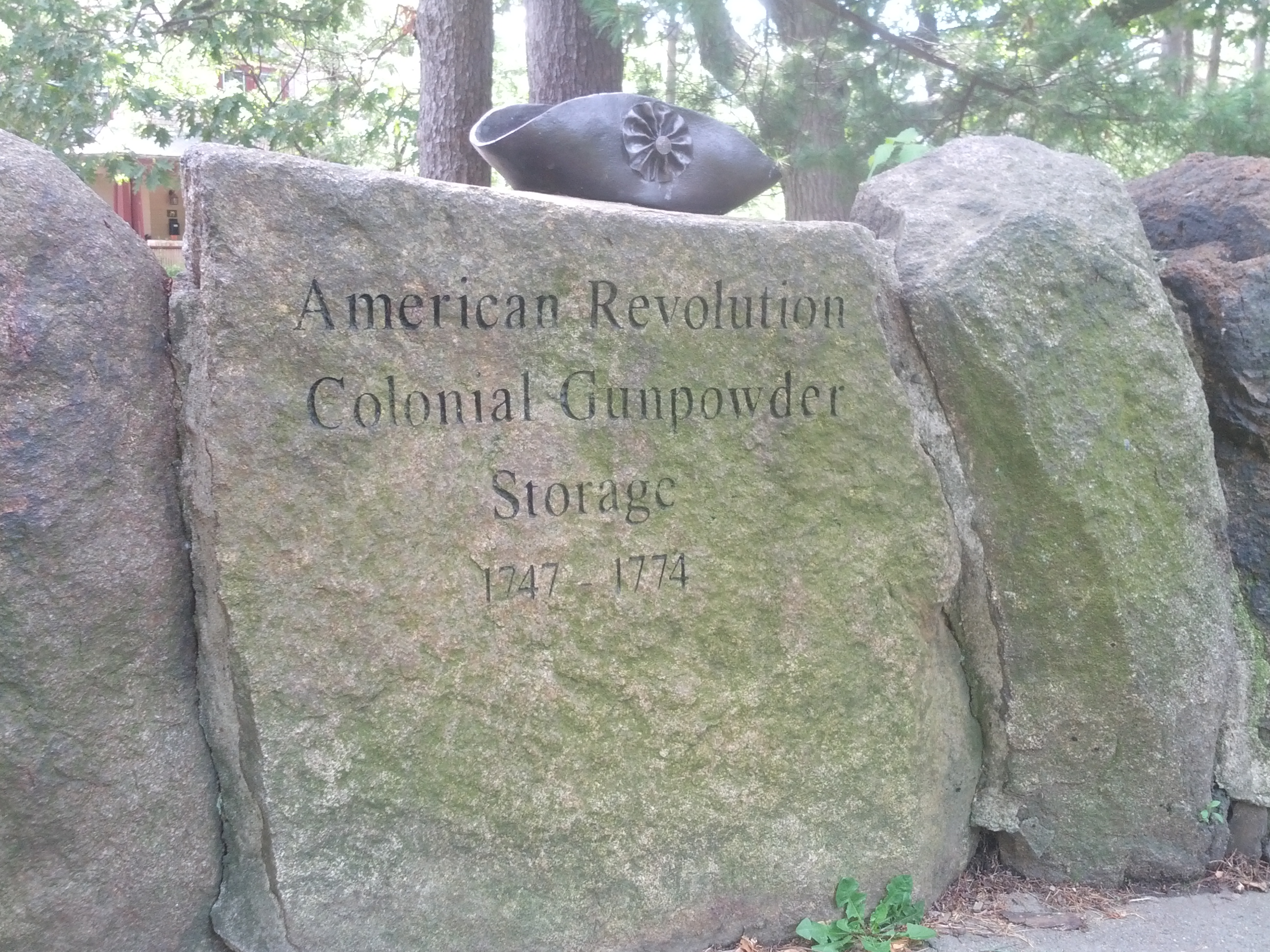

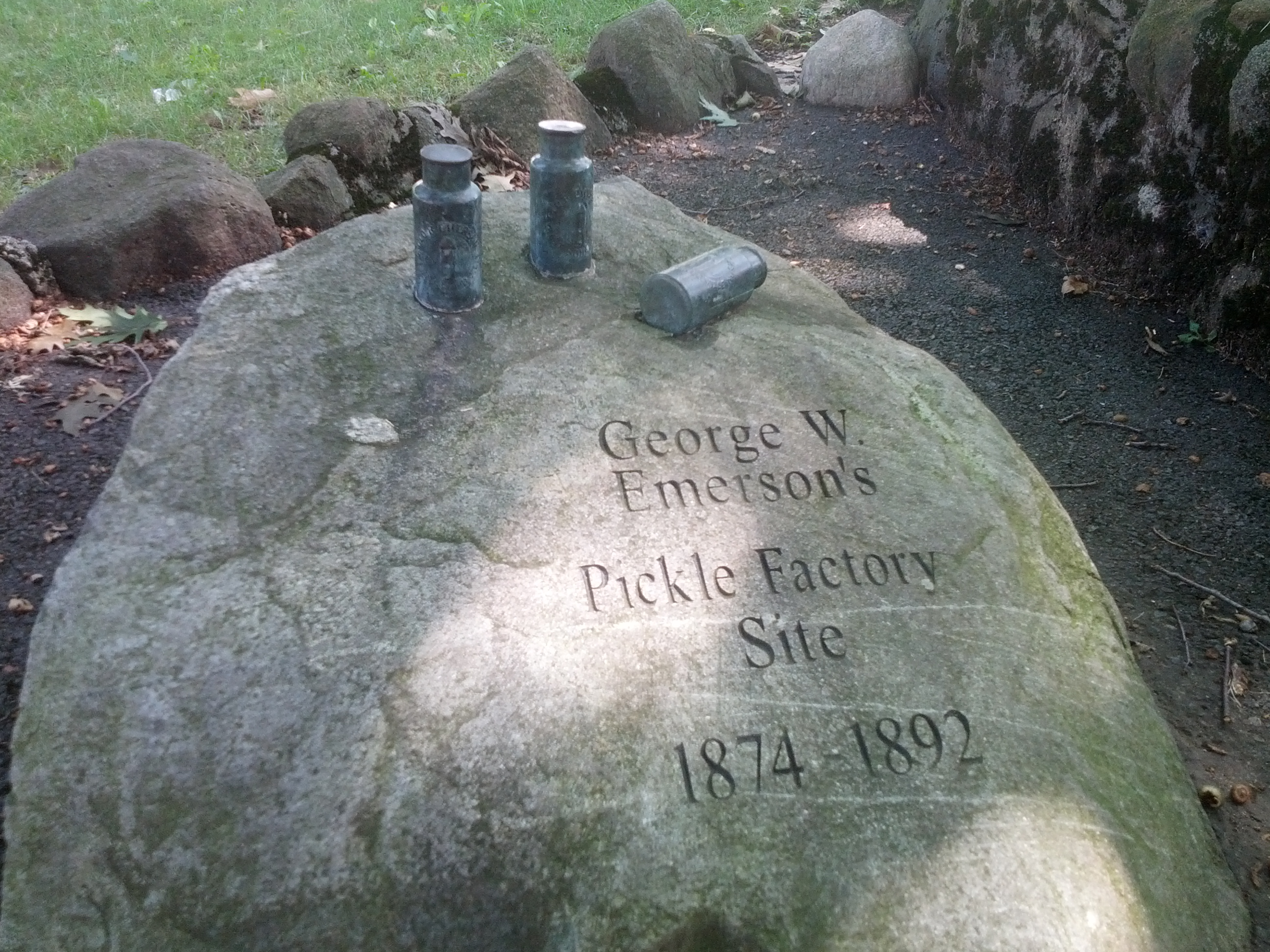

A close-up view of the directory on the island of Powder House Square

The island within the actual traffic circle is a tiny park on its own, complete with walkways, benches, and neatly arranged bushes and other flora. There is a large 360 degree directional post that points in the direction of dozens of different communities (like Arlington, Medford, and Winchester).

Powder House Square is located less than a half mile from Davis Square, Teele Square and Ball Square in Somerville. It is served by MBTA buses 80 (Arlington Center/Lechmere), 89 (Clarendon Hill/Sullivan Square), 94 (Davis Square/Medford Square), and 96 (Harvard Station/Medford Square). Red Line subway service to Harvard Square and downtown Boston is conveniently close at Davis Square Station. Powder House Square is approximately one mile from Exit 31 of I-93.

An MBTA station at Ball Square, part of the Green Line Extension project, is a short walk from Powder House Square, making it now within a half mile of the Green Line in addition to the nearby Red Line station at Davis Square.

Several businesses thrive on or around Powder House Square, including restaurants, several small medical and dental practices, and a funeral home.

== See also ==
- National Register of Historic Places listings in Somerville, Massachusetts
- Powder Alarm
