= William Brattle =

American politician, lawyer, and militia officer (1706–1776)

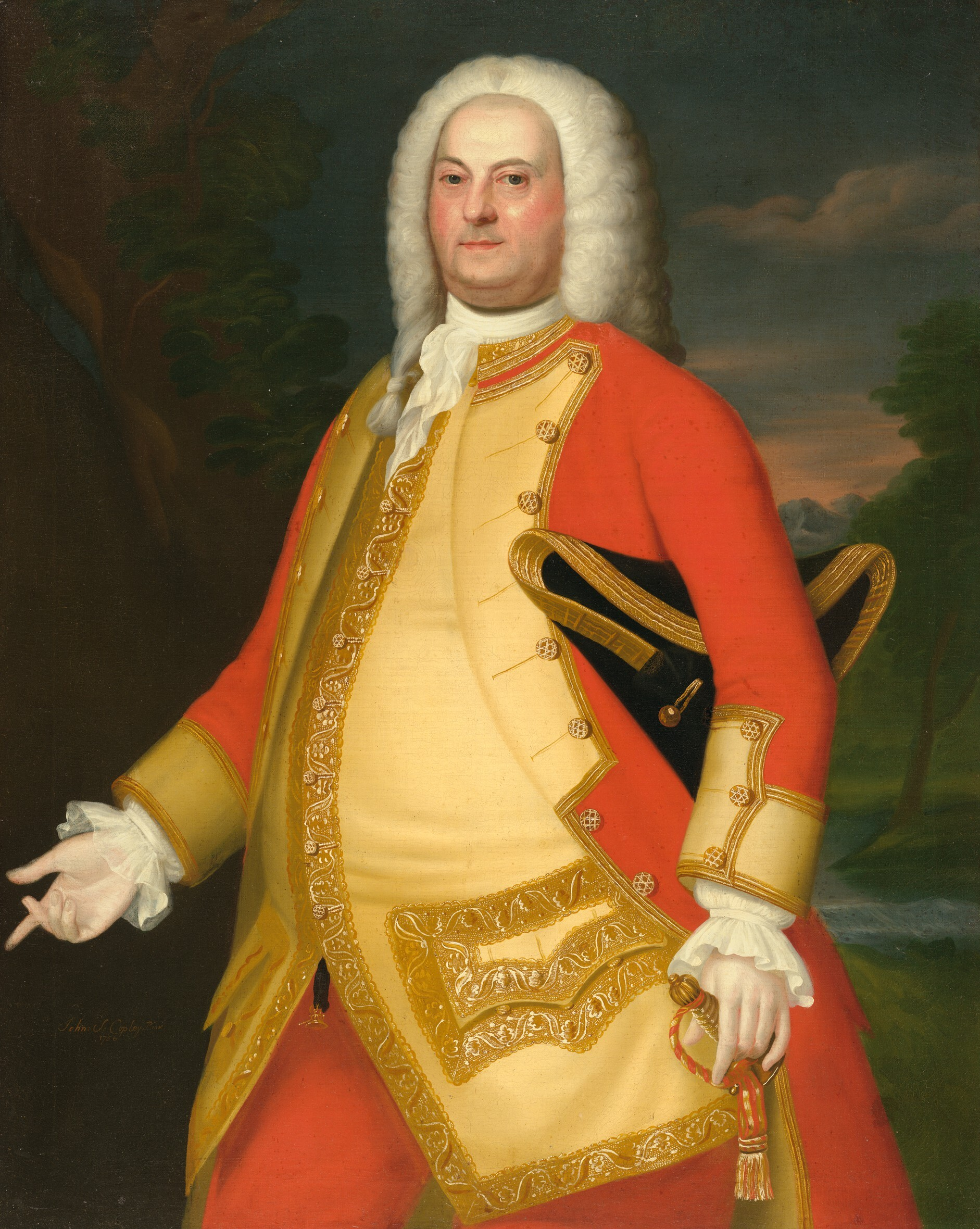
- Portrait by John Singleton Copley, 1756

Massachusetts Attorney General
- In office 1736–1738
- Monarch: George II
- Preceded by: John Overing
- Succeeded by: John Overing

Personal details
- Born: April 18, 1706 Cambridge, Massachusetts
- Died: October 25, 1776 (aged 70) Halifax, Nova Scotia
- Resting place: Old Burying Ground
- Spouse(s): Katherine Saltonstall (m. 1727); Martha Fitch (m. 1752)
- Children: 9
- Nickname: "Brigadier Paunch"

Military service
- Allegiance: Massachusetts
- Branch/service: Massachusetts Militia
- Years of service: 1729–1776
- Rank: Major general
- Unit: 1st Regiment of Militia of Middlesex
- Battles/wars: King George's War; French and Indian War

Major General William Brattle (April 18, 1706 – October 25, 1776) was an American politician, lawyer, and militia officer who served as the Massachusetts Attorney General from 1736 to 1738. Born into a prominent Massachusetts family, Brattle inherited the estates of his father and uncle at a young age and attended Harvard College, fully graduating from the college in 1725. He proceeded to dabble in preaching, law, and medicine before switching to a career in politics and military service in 1729. Brattle was elected to the colony's House of Assembly and commissioned into the colonial militia both in that year.

Over the course of the 1730s, Brattle continued to be involved in politics. In addition to establishing his own private law practice, he was also appointed as the colony's Attorney General in 1736, though Brattle never prosecuted anyone as attorney general due to resistance from Governor Jonathan Belcher. In 1745, he was appointed as the commander of the garrison at Castle William after King George's War broke out, though Brattle saw no military action. He married twice, the first time in 1727 and the second in 1755. Though Brattle's marriages produced nine children, only two of them survived to adulthood.

During the early years of the American Revolution, Brattle was a leader of colonial opposition to the British Crown, though by the 1770s he had gradually shifted to the Loyalist camp. In 1774, Brattle unwittingly sparked the Powder Alarm, leading to a riot in which armed mobs forced him to flee to Boston. In 1775, the American Revolutionary War broke out, and the Continental Army began besieging Boston. When the British evacuated the city in 1776, Brattle went with them to Nova Scotia, where he died several months later. In the 21st century, Brattle's ownership of slaves has come under increasing scrutiny.

== Early life ==
William Brattle was born on April 18, 1706 in Cambridge, Massachusetts. He was born into a prominent Massachusetts family which had emigrated from England during the early 17th century as part of the waves of Puritan migration. His father, also named William, was a Congregationalist clergyman and fellow of the Royal Society who had served as minister of the First Parish in Cambridge from 1696 to 1717. Brattle's mother was Elizabeth Brattle (née Hayman), who married his father on November 3, 1697 in Boston. Brattle had only one sibling, an older brother named Thomas who died at a young age.

His father died in Cambridge on February 15, 1717, and Brattle inherited his estate along with that of Brattle's uncle Thomas. In 1718, he began attending Harvard College. Brattle graduated four years later with a Bachelor of Arts degree, before graduating again with a master's degree in 1725. Soon after graduating, he began a career in preaching, aiming to become the town clergyman of Ipswich. Discouraged by the poor reception he faced there, Brattle switched careers and began working as a physician in 1726, with many of his patients being members of prominent local families or Harvard students.

In December 1726, he accompanied a diplomatic expedition under Lieutenant Governor of Massachusetts William Tailer to the Wabanaki Confederacy as a physician. On November 23, 1727, Brattle married Katherine Saltonstall, the daughter of the governor of Connecticut, Gurdon Saltonstall. In the same year, he arranged for the construction of a large Georgian-style mansion in Cambridge, which eventually became known as the William Brattle House or "Old Brattle House" and was described by the British-born writer James H. Stark as "the resort of the fashion and style of this section of the country."

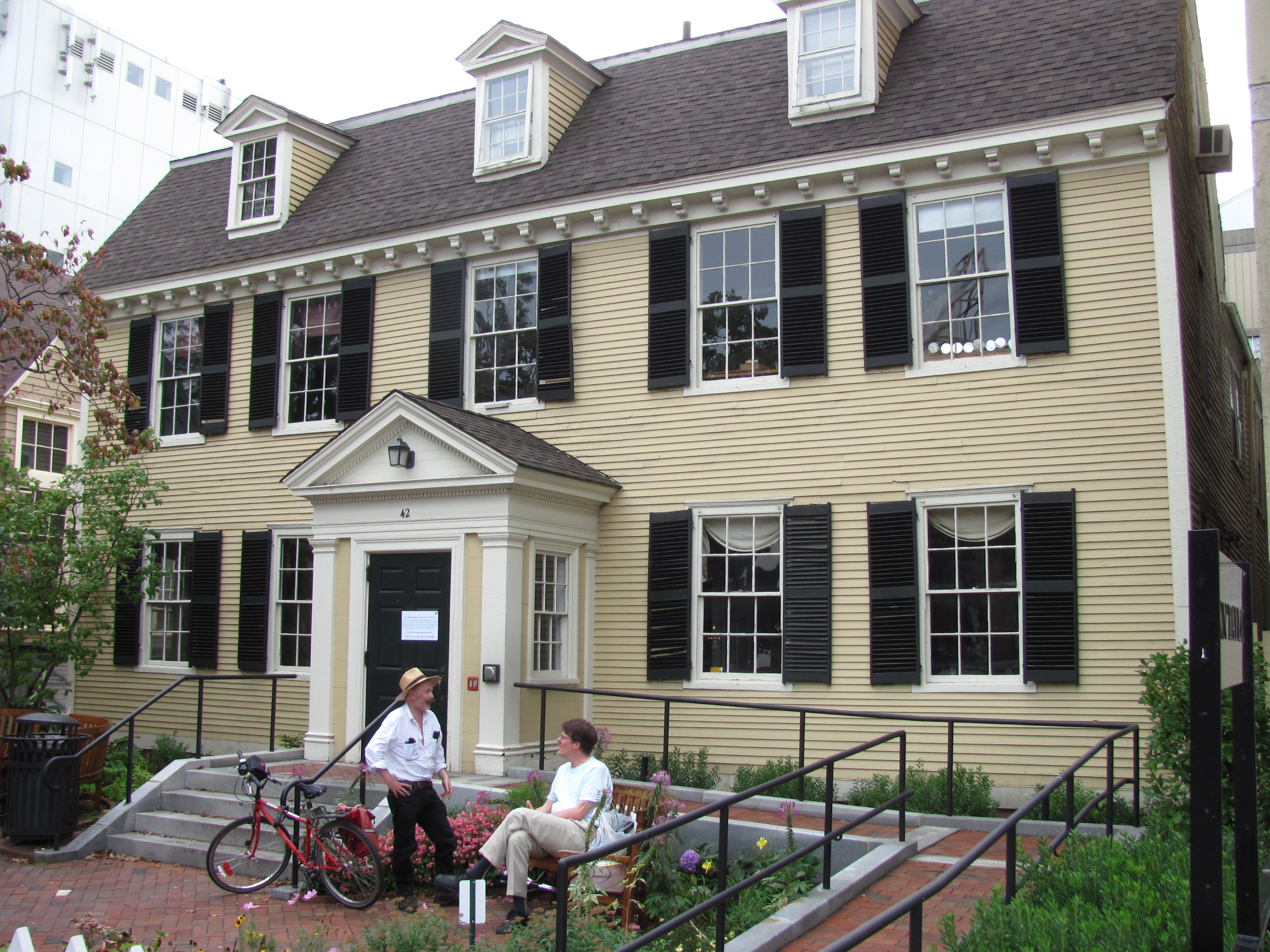
The William Brattle House in 2011

== Political and military career ==
In 1729, Brattle "plunged immediately into public affairs." He was elected to serve on the Cambridge board of selectmen and also as a representative in the Massachusetts House of Assembly, in addition to being appointed as a justice of the peace (JP). In the same year, Brattle was commissioned into the Massachusetts Militia at the rank of major along with joining the Ancient and Honorable Artillery Company of Massachusetts. Despite his youth, he quickly joined in the ongoing political struggle in the House of Assembly between populist assemblymen and Governor William Burnet on the side of the former.

Brattle served on the committees which welcomed the new governor Jonathan Belcher in 1730 and delineated Massachusetts' border with Rhode Island in 1733, though he declined to sit on the committee that delineated the border with Connecticut as a result of feeling that he already had enough experience. While serving in the 1st Regiment of Militia of Middlesex, Brattle wrote the military training manual Sundry Rules and Directions for Drawing up a Regiment, which was published in 1733; "many an English or American officer packed [the manual] in his haversack" while fighting in the French and Indian War.

In 1736, Brattle was appointed as one of the JPs who sat with judges in the Middlesex County court. He was appointed as the colony's attorney general by the House of Assembly in the same year, though Brattle never prosecuted anyone during the two years he served as attorney general as Belcher insisted the office could only be filled by those chosen by himself and the Governor's Council. Despite this, Brattle sat as a Massachusetts Superior Court special justice in 1749. The American historian Clifford K. Shipton characterized Brattle's "ability in law [as] not much greater than in medicine and preaching."

During the early 1740s, a Christian revival known as the First Great Awakening swept across British North America. In 1741, Brattle came into conflict with George Whitefield, the leader of the revival in North America who accused Harvard College of promoting irreligiosity and Arminianism. To rebut Whitefield's claims, Brattle published two letters in the Boston Gazette in mid-1741 which argued that much of the accepted history of Harvard, in particular its earlier years, was riddled with misinformation. The letters were met with a positive reception in Massachusetts, with Paul Dudley, then serving as the Massachusetts Superior Court of Judicature's chief justice, making a speech about Brattle's letters to a jury in which he praised his arguments.

In 1745, amidst a French invasion scare in the Thirteen Colonies as a result of King George's War, Governor William Shirley, of whom Brattle was a strong supporter, appointed him commander of the garrison at Castle William. There, Brattle performed little more duties then serving as the garrison's drillmaster. Katherine died in Cambridge in 1752, and on November 2, 1755, Brattle remarried to Martha Allen, the widow of the Boston politician James Allen. In either 1755 or 1756, he was elected to serve on the Governor's Council and during the French and Indian War Brattle represented Massachusetts in negotiations with authorities in Connecticut for mutual defence. Having been promoted to the rank of colonel by 1741, he was promoted again to brigadier general in 1760.

== American Revolution and death ==
During the 1760s, despite having previously been a supporter of Crown governors, Brattle emerged as a leader of colonial opposition to British policies toward the Thirteen Colonies. Disappointed by the fact that Thomas Hutchinson was appointed as chief justice of the Superior Court of Judicature in 1761, he led the anti-government faction in the Governor's Council, while in the House of Assembly the faction was led by fellow populist James Otis Jr. On November 5, 1765, in lieu of the traditional Guy Fawkes Night, in which mobs from Boston's North and South Ends battled over the possession of effigies of the pope and Stuart pretender, Brattle and fellow populist Ebenezer Mackintosh headed a procession to symbolise the militia and mobs joining forces, angering Governor Francis Bernard.

In 1767 and again from 1772 to 1773, Brattle served with Hutchinson and John Hancock in a committee which conducted boundary negotiations with authorities in New York. Brattle and James Bowdoin were elected to the Governor's Council in 1769, though this was blocked by Bernard, who alleged that the two men were "the Managers of all late Opposition in the Council to the Kings Government." Bernard also revoked Brattle's colonelcy of the 1st Regiment of Militia of Middlesex, while Brattle sent a private letter to Lord Dartmouth explaining the situation and reaffirming his loyalty to the Crown. In the spring of 1770, Brattle was elected by voters in Cambridge to the House of Assembly, where he served on a committee that managed the construction of gunpowder magazines in the colony.

Despite having previously supported the anti-government Sons of Liberty, Brattle publicly split with them in January 1773 over his argument in a Cambridge town meeting on December 1772 that judges in Massachusetts should have fixed salaries to make them independent of both the governor and House of Assembly. Brattle's argument led to a war of letters between him and a local attorney, John Adams, which brought the latter into the political limelight. Shipton argued that Brattle had not intended to provoke a controversy while Adams had "tried to split legal hairs". From that point onwards, "Brattle could be counted among the increasing numbers of the old political élite who, while initially having opposed British policy, feared that the growth of popular politics threatened the social order."

To reward him for his role in the affair, Hutchinson promoted Brattle to the rank of major general in 1773. On August 27, 1774, Brattle sent a letter to Governor Thomas Gage, informing him that only British-owned gunpowder remained in the Old Powder House near Boston. Four days later, Gage dispatched roughly 260 soldiers from the 4th Regiment of Foot to remove the gunpowder. At the same time, Gage lost the letter Brattle wrote to him, which was soon found by local Patriots and publicized. Rumors emerged that violence had broken out during the powder's removal; an angry mob proceeded to Brattle's mansion, forcing him to flee to Castle William seeking British protection. However, the mobs soon dispersed as it became clear that no violence had actually occurred.

On September 5, 1774, several newspapers in Boston published a letter from Brattle in which he insisted that he had not persuaded Gage to remove the powder; according to Brattle's account, Gage had requested a full account of the Old Powder House's contents from him, and he had merely complied. Brattle continued to live in Boston when the American Revolutionary War broke out in April 1775, with the Continental Army besieging the city. On March 17, 1776, General Sir William Howe, having decided his position was untenable, ordered the British garrison in Boston to be evacuated to Halifax, Nova Scotia. Brattle went with them, and died in Halifax on October 25, 1776. After a ceremony at St. Paul's Church, he was interred at the Old Burying Ground on October 26.

== Personal life, family and legacy ==
During his lifetime, Brattle gained a reputation as a "jovial, pleasure-loving man whose... family connections placed him among the Massachusetts élite." He enjoyed gambling, fishing and eating, with his political enemies nicknaming him "Brigadier Paunch" due to his weight. In addition to sitting 21 times on Cambridge's board of selectmen, Brattle was also a member of Harvard College's Board of Overseers, serving on the committees responsible for overseeing the construction of Hollis Hall and the reconstruction of Harvard Hall. In 1756, John Singleton Copley painted a portrait of Brattle influenced by earlier colonial-era portraitists such as Joseph Blackburn and Robert Feke and which depicted him wearing a "fanciful" uniform similar to Copley's 1755 portrait of Joshua Winslow.

Brattle's two marriages produced nine children, though only two survived to adulthood, Thomas and Katherine. Thomas was in England when the Revolutionary War broke out, and posed as a Loyalist. After his return to North America in 1779, Thomas convinced local American authorities that he was a Patriot and in 1784 inherited the William Brattle Mansion, which had been entrusted by Brattle to Katherine in 1776. In addition to his estate in Cambridge, Brattle also owned properties in Boston, Oakham, Halifax and southeastern Vermont. Brattle was also a slaveholder, being recorded in church records as owning two enslaved women, Philicia and Zillah, in 1731 and 1738 respectively. Brattle Street in Cambridge is named after him, as is the town of Brattleboro, Vermont.

In the early 21st century, Brattle's slave ownership has come under increasing scrutiny. An art installation titled "Forgotten Souls of Tory Row: Remembering the Enslaved People of Brattle Street" was installed at the Hooper–Lee–Nichols House in Cambridge in 2022. The installation was composed of two circles of linked metal trees, which were intended to represented those enslaved by prominent Cantabrigians such as Brattle. On April 26, 2022, Harvard University released a report detailing the university's ties to slavery and plans to deal with such connections. The report, which noted that both Brattle and his father owned slaves, stipulated that the university would commit $100 million for an endowed "Legacy of Slavery Fund", though it did not provide direct reparations for slavery.

Legal offices
Preceded by John Overing	Massachusetts Attorney General; 1736–1738	Succeeded by John Overing
