= Fort Independence (Massachusetts) =

- U.S. National Register of Historic Places
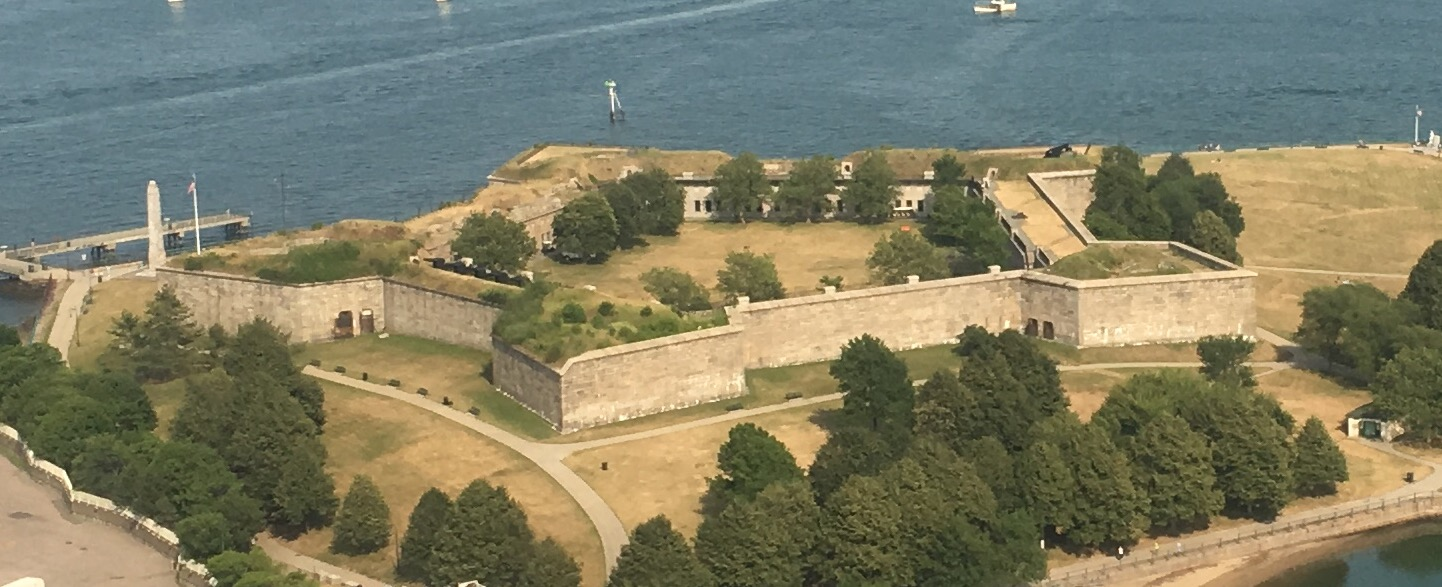

- Location within Massachusetts Location within the United States
- Location: Castle Island, Boston, Massachusetts
- Coordinates: 42°20′17″N 71°0′42″W
- Area: 15 acres (6.1 ha)
- Built: 1634
- NRHP reference No.: 70000921
- Added to NRHP: October 15, 1970

Fort Independence is a granite bastion fort that provided harbor defenses for Boston, Massachusetts, located on Castle Island. Fort Independence is one of the oldest continuously fortified sites of English origin in the United States. The first primitive fortification was called "The Castle", placed on the site in 1634. It was rebuilt twice, then replaced around 1692 with a more substantial structure known as Castle William. It was abandoned by the British during the American Revolution, but the Americans renamed it Fort Adams and then Fort Independence. The existing granite fort was constructed between 1833 and 1851. Today it is preserved as a state park and fires occasional ceremonial salutes. Fort Independence was added to the National Register of Historic Places in 1970.

== History ==
=== Castle William ===
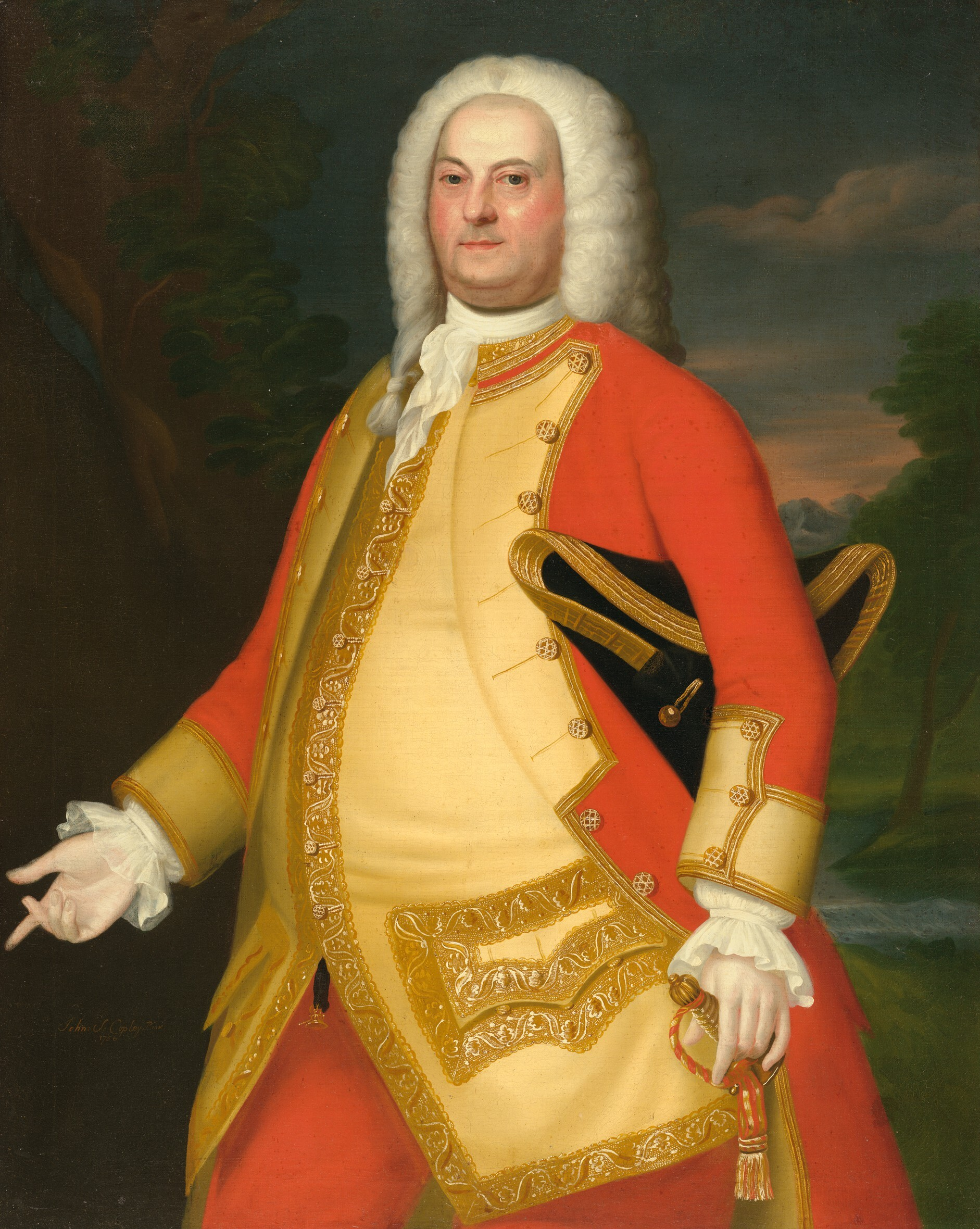
William Brattle, who was appointed the commander of Castle William in 1745

The site of Fort Independence has been occupied by various fortifications since 1634. The first fort to be constructed on Castle Island resulted from a visit by Governor John Winthrop; it was partly financed by him and the council. Construction was planned and supervised by Deputy Gov. Roger Ludlow and Captain John Mason of Dorchester, producing a "castle with mud walls" with masonry of oyster shell lime in which cannon were mounted to defend Boston from attack by sea. The first commander of the fort was Captain Nicholas Simpkins in 1634. The first fort soon fell into disrepair and was rebuilt in 1644 following a scare due to the arrival of a French warship in the harbor. The fort was reconstructed out of pine logs, stone, and earth, with 10-foot walls around a compound 50 feet square. It mounted six saker cannons and three smaller guns. A later commander was Captain Richard Davenport, who supervised the post from 1645 until 1665 when he was struck by lightning and killed. His successor was Captain Roger Clap, who commanded the fort from 1665–1686.

On March 21, 1673, the fort was destroyed by fire. It was rebuilt the next year in stone, with 38 guns and 16 culverins in the four-bastion main fort, along with six guns in a water battery. Governor Edmund Andros was confined in the fort and sent to England to stand trial in 1689, following the Glorious Revolution in England, in which James II was replaced by William III. In 1692, the fort was renamed "Castle William" in honor of the king and rebuilt. The new work had 54 cannon: 24 9-pounders, 12 24-pounders, and a total of 18 32- and 48-pounders. Such armament was necessary for the defense of Boston due to the ongoing King William's War.

From 1701 to 1703, the fort was further expanded. It was designed by Wolfgang William Romer, the chief engineer of British forces in the American colonies, and its armament was nearly doubled to 100 guns. In 1740, a fifth bastion was added mounting 20 42-pounders.

In the years leading up to the American Revolution, Castle William became a refuge for British officials during periods of unrest and rioting in Boston. In 1763, Thomas Goldthwaite, half-brother of Ezekiel Goldthwait, was appointed commissioner to take charge of the repairs of Castle William. Violence forced provincial leaders and British soldiers to take shelter within the fort in the wake of events such as the Stamp Act crisis in 1765 and the Boston Massacre in 1770. In September 1765, the stamps to be issued under the Stamp Act were kept at the fort.

As the American Revolution erupted in 1775, American forces quickly commenced the Siege of Boston, and British forces made Castle William their primary stronghold. It was not until the Continental Army led by George Washington managed the fortification of Dorchester Heights that Castle William was threatened and the British evacuated Boston in March 1776. Before leaving Castle William, the British set fire to the fort, damaging it and its ordnance as best they could.

During the Revolutionary War, a fort called Fort Independence was built on Point Allerton in Hull, Massachusetts. In 1797, the name was transferred to the former Castle William, apparently leaving the fort in Hull without a name. That fort fell into disuse after the War of 1812. The site in Hull was named Fort Revere with a new fort built in the late 19th century.

=== Fort Adams ===
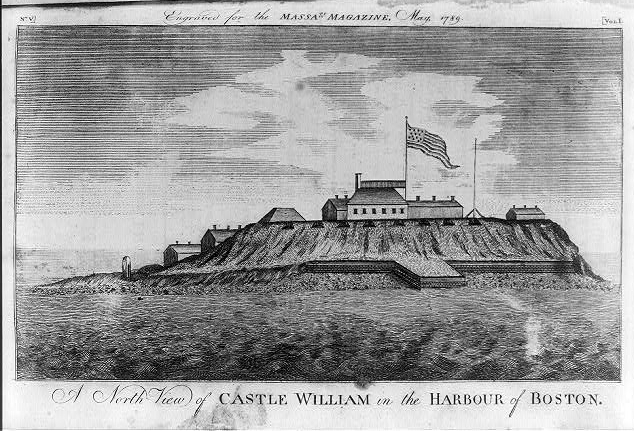
A rebuilt Castle William, known at that time as Fort Adams, shortly after the American Revolution

American forces rebuilt the fort in 1776 and renamed it Fort Adams. In 1785, the legislature of Massachusetts designated the fort as a prison, in which capacity it served until 1805.

The fort was renamed Fort Independence during a ceremony attended by President John Adams in 1799. The following year, the fortification and the island were turned over to the United States government. The fort was rebuilt and expanded in 1800-1803 under the first system of US fortifications, as designed by military engineer Jean Foncin. The Secretary of War's report on fortifications for December 1811 describes the fort as "...a regular pentagon, with bastions of masonry, mounting 42 heavy cannon, with two [additional] batteries for six guns...". During the War of 1812, a squadron of the British Navy repeatedly captured American merchant and fishing vessels in Massachusetts Bay; however, they never attempted an attack on the port of Boston due to the strength of Fort Independence.

=== Existing structure ===
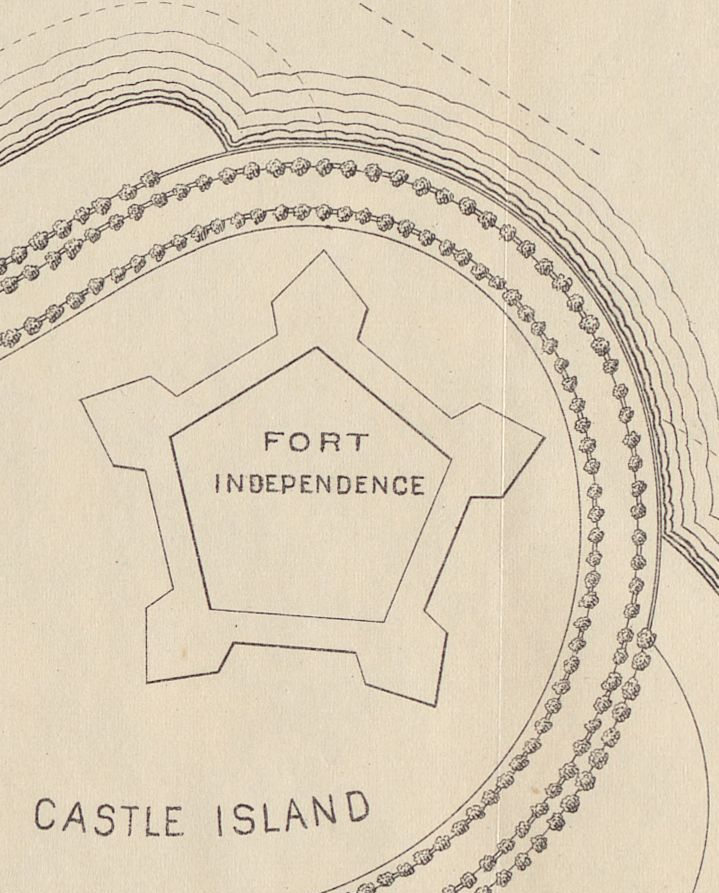
Fort Independence map in 1883 study for a plan of Pleasure Bay

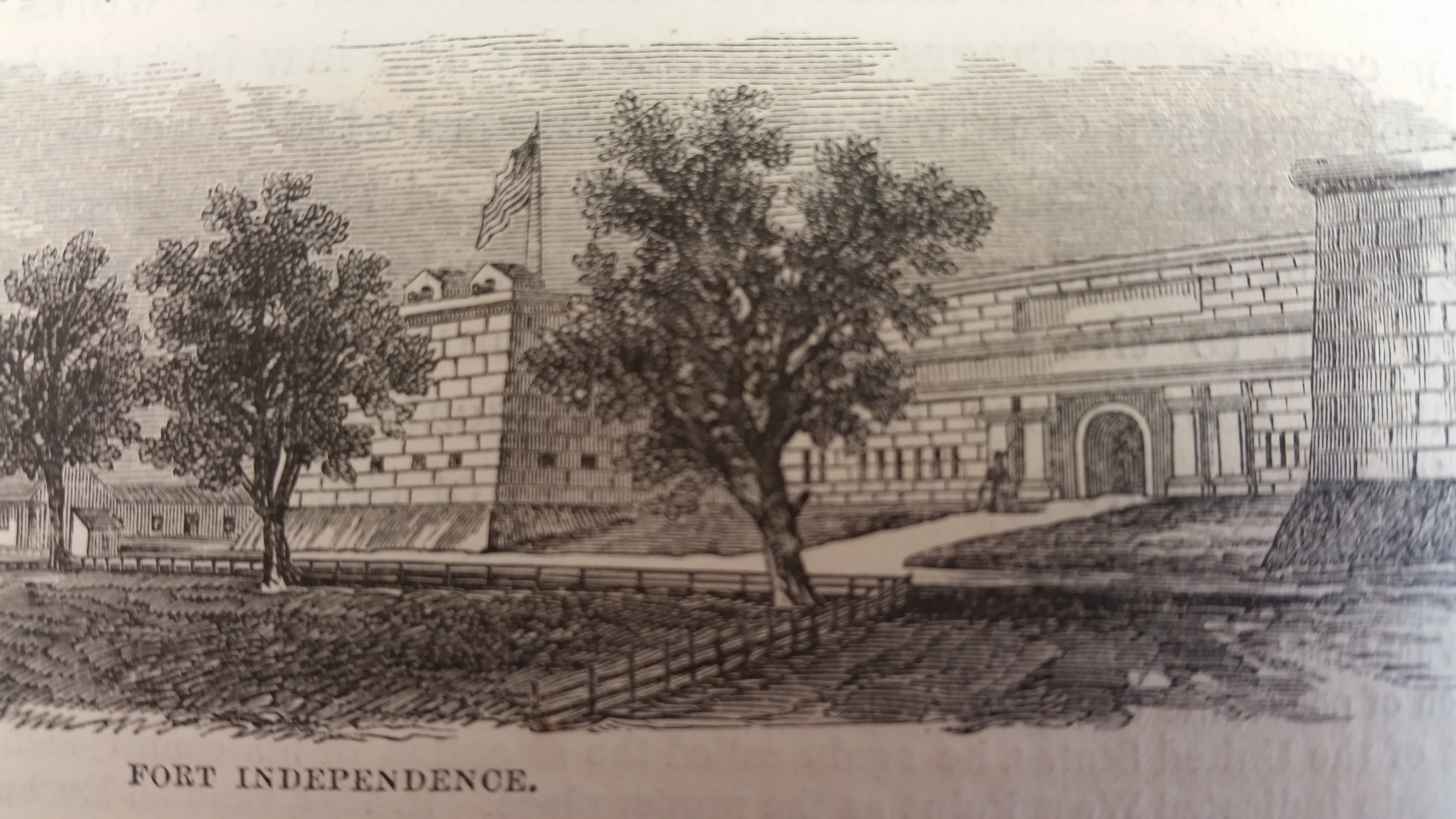
Fort Independence

Work on the present fort began in 1833 under the third system of US fortifications, supervised by Colonel Sylvanus Thayer, one of the nation's leading military engineers of the time. The new fort had walls 30 feet (9.1 m) high and 5.5 feet (1.7 m) thick and was constructed primarily out of granite from Rockport, Massachusetts. It was substantially complete by 1848, although repairs and other work continued until 1861. At the height of its strength during the American Civil War, it mounted 96 cannon, some of which were 15-inch Rodman guns capable of firing a 450-pound shot more than 3 miles (4.8 km). A small part of Castle William's brick structure remains in the rear portion of the present fort, but is covered up by subsequent stonework.

At the start of the Civil War in 1861, Fort Independence was garrisoned by the Fourth Battalion Massachusetts Volunteer Militia. The battalion set the fort in order and were trained in infantry and artillery drill, eventually forming the nucleus of the 24th Regiment Massachusetts Volunteer Infantry. At least two other infantry regiments were trained at Fort Independence during the Civil War—the 11th Massachusetts and the 13th Massachusetts.

Following the Civil War, Fort Independence gradually fell out of use, as its importance was reduced by the larger Fort Warren which had also been constructed under the direction of Sylvanus Thayer. In the 1880s, landscape architect Frederick Law Olmsted designed a series of parkways and parks in Boston known as the Emerald Necklace. Olmsted had originally envisioned a parkway to be known as the Dorchesterway that would connect Castle Island (via a new earthen causeway) to the rest of the Emerald Necklace. The Dorchesterway was never realized, although Boston did undertake a large-scale project in the 1890s to create a park-like environment around Fort Independence. In 1890, the Federal government ceded Castle Island (excluding the fort) to the Commonwealth of Massachusetts. The city of Boston commenced filling the marshes separating Castle Island from South Boston in 1890 with the intention of creating green space and promenades. The process was finished in the 1920s and Castle Island ceased to be an island. The Federal government ceded the fort to the city of Boston in 1908.

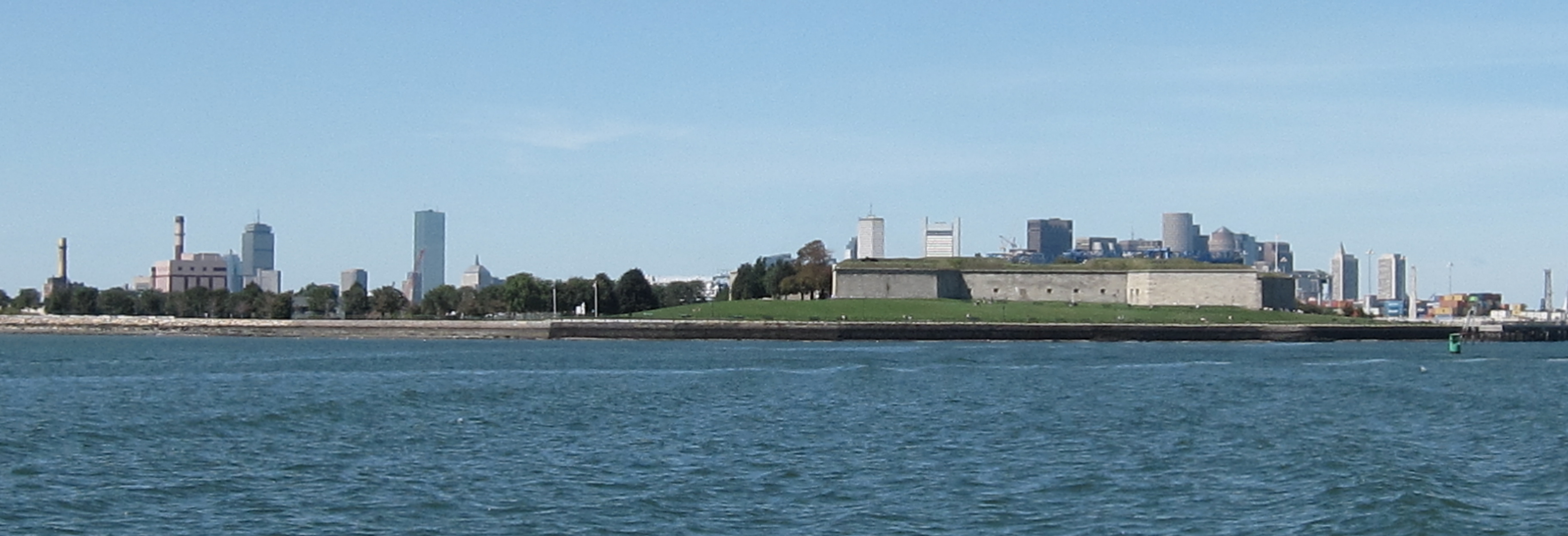
Castle Island and Fort Independence commanding the approach to modern Boston Harbor

The Federal government briefly reclaimed Castle Island in 1898 during the Spanish American War, but it was quickly returned to the city of Boston in 1899. The military again took control of Fort Independence during World War I and World War II, and anti-aircraft guns were added. During World War I, the fort was used primarily as a depot for small arms ammunition. During World War II, the Navy used it as a degaussing station for de-magnetizing the hulls of ships. At the close of both conflicts, the fort was promptly returned to the city of Boston.

In 1962, the Federal government permanently deeded Castle Island and Fort Independence to the Commonwealth of Massachusetts. It is now overseen by the Massachusetts Department of Conservation and Recreation and the non-profit Castle Island Association. Over the course of its history, a shot was never fired in anger from Fort Independence.

== Edgar Allan Poe and a duel ==
A monument outside the west battery of the fort marks the grave of Lieutenant Robert F. Massie who was killed in a sword duel with Lieutenant Gustavus Drane on December 25, 1817. According to folklorist Edward Rowe Snow, Massie was so popular with the soldiers stationed at Fort Independence that they walled up his killer within a vault in the fort. Edgar Allan Poe was serving with the 1st United States Artillery Regiment at Fort Independence in 1827, and he purportedly was inspired by the story to write "The Cask of Amontillado".

The legend, however, is not entirely accurate. The duel did take place, but Lieutenant Drane was not murdered by the fort's soldiers. He continued in his military career, was promoted to the rank of captain, and died on active duty in 1846. After World War II, Lieutenant Massie's remains were moved to the Fort Devens Cemetery near the town of Ayer, Massachusetts.

== Cultural references ==
Fort Independence shares its location with "The Castle" in Fallout 4 by Bethesda Game Studios. This game location, as with many in the Fallout universe, is inspired by its real-life counterpart. The size and layout of The Castle is not an exact replica of Fort Independence.

== See also ==
- National Register of Historic Places listings in southern Boston, Massachusetts
- List of military installations in Massachusetts
