= Thaddeus Bowman =

American soldier in Revolutionary War (1712–1806)

Thaddeus Bowman (September 2, 1712 – May 26, 1806) was the last scout sent out by Capt. John Parker at Lexington, Massachusetts, but the only one to find the approaching British troops and get back to warn the militia on the first day of the American Revolution ("the shot heard 'round the world").

== Background ==
In early 1775, the British commander in America, Lieutenant-General Thomas Gage, knew first-hand the level of colonial dissatisfaction with British policies on the rights of the colonists. He feared this could lead to serious violence, and he was under pressure from England to do something to show the power of the Crown. He also knew, through informants, that the patriots had stored a large quantity of gunpowder, cannon and other military supplies in Concord. By sending an expeditionary force out from Boston to seize these supplies, he intended to show the might of the British Empire and hoped to prevent any future hostilities with the colonists.

Patriot leaders, such as John Hancock, Samuel Adams, Paul Revere, Dr. Joseph Warren, James Otis, Jr., Benjamin Edes and John Gill, were not only mobilizing public opinion against restrictive British policies, but also kept close tabs on the activities of the British troops in Boston. Edes and Gill were the publishers of the Boston Gazette, a newspaper which printed the multitude of articles written by Samuel Adams, laying out the patriot cause. Their print shop was a favorite meeting place for the leaders of the movement.

On the night of April 18, 1775, the expeditionary force of over 700 soldiers left Boston. Paul Revere rode to warn John Hancock and Samuel Adams, who were staying in Lexington (which is on the way to Concord), to leave so they would not be arrested by the British force. Revere had previously arranged the famous lantern signal from the Old North Church to patriots on the other side of the Charles River, so they could spread the word, in case Revere was prevented from leaving Boston.

Revere made it to Lexington at midnight, where he alarmed the town, Adams and Hancock, as well as set in motion a network of alarm riders that fanned out across the colony. John Parker, the captain of the Lexington Militia, mustered his men on Lexington Green and held an impromptu town meeting in the open air. Samuel Adams, John Hancock and Jonas Clarke, the town minister, were there.

== "The Shot Heard 'Round the World" and Bowman's Role ==
As any good commander does, Parker wanted as much information as possible on the situation he was about to face. So, he sent out scouts, one of whom was Thaddeus Bowman. One scout made it as far as Cambridge and back, and reported seeing no sign of British Regulars. There had been false alarms before, and Parker also knew that the supplies at Concord had been dispersed to other towns and/or hidden. Previous British expeditions to other towns had resulted in no bloodshed and no discovery of any colonial arms - just a tiring exercise for the king's troops. If the troops were actually coming, it was likely that they would march through town, reach Concord, find nothing, and return to Boston empty-handed.

Parker dismissed his men, but instructed them to stay within the sound of a drum.

At about 4:15 a.m., Thaddeus Bowman came riding up at a full gallop. He had found the Regulars, but had been trapped on the road behind them, and unable to get back to warn the town earlier. He reported to Capt. Parker that they were already past "the Rocks," a landmark which meant that they were less than half an hour away. Capt. Parker instantly mustered his company, ordering his drummer, William Diamond, to beat "To Arms," a long roll. The town bell was sounded and alarm guns were fired.

At Lexington Green, the road to Bedford meets the road from Boston to Concord. Parker formed up his men in the open Common between these two roads, in parade ground formation. They were not hiding behind stone walls. His purpose was to show colonial determination, but not to block either road, and not to provoke a fight. His orders to his men were, "Let the troops pass by. Don't molest them, without they being first."

Unfortunately, the lead companies of the British force went right at the fork in the road (toward Bedford instead of Concord), and the key officers in charge were further back in the column. Major John Pitcairn, seeing the mistake, rode quickly forward, but too late to alter the course of the rapidly unfolding events. The lead companies saw the militia and formed up into a line of battle. A shot was fired - no one knows by whom. Both sides denied shooting first, and that could well be true. There were many spectators milling around, some of whom had spent the evening in Buckman Tavern, which is across the street from the Green. The first shot could have come from one of them. Regardless, the Regulars reacted to it and started firing, then charged the militia and bayoneted anyone left on the field.

Seven Lexington men were killed, and nine wounded.

Hearing the skirmish, British Lt. Col. Francis Smith rode up and knew what to do. He found a drummer and ordered him to beat "Cease Fire." He reformed his troops and marched them off to Concord.

Capt. Parker got his revenge though. He performed what Gen. John Galvin has called a "miracle of leadership, regrouping and reanimating his company after the Regulars overran it in the dawn attack... Somehow he was able to transform the scattered and demoralized soldiers into a fighting unit again, determined to avenge the loss of their comrades by meeting the British on their return from Concord."

Meet them they did. The Lexington militia company set up an effective ambush from good cover at a bend in the road at the Lexington town line. They took a heavy toll on the Regulars, including hitting the commanding officer. Lt. Col. Smith took a musket ball in the thigh which also unhorsed him.

By now, angry militia companies from all over Massachusetts, and even adjoining colonies, were converging on the area. The British column began taking fire from all sides. If Lt. Gen. Gage had not sent out another thousand troops as re-enforcements, along with two cannon, the initial 700 would have never made it back to Boston.

== Burial ==
He was buried at the Congregational Church in New Braintree, Massachusetts.

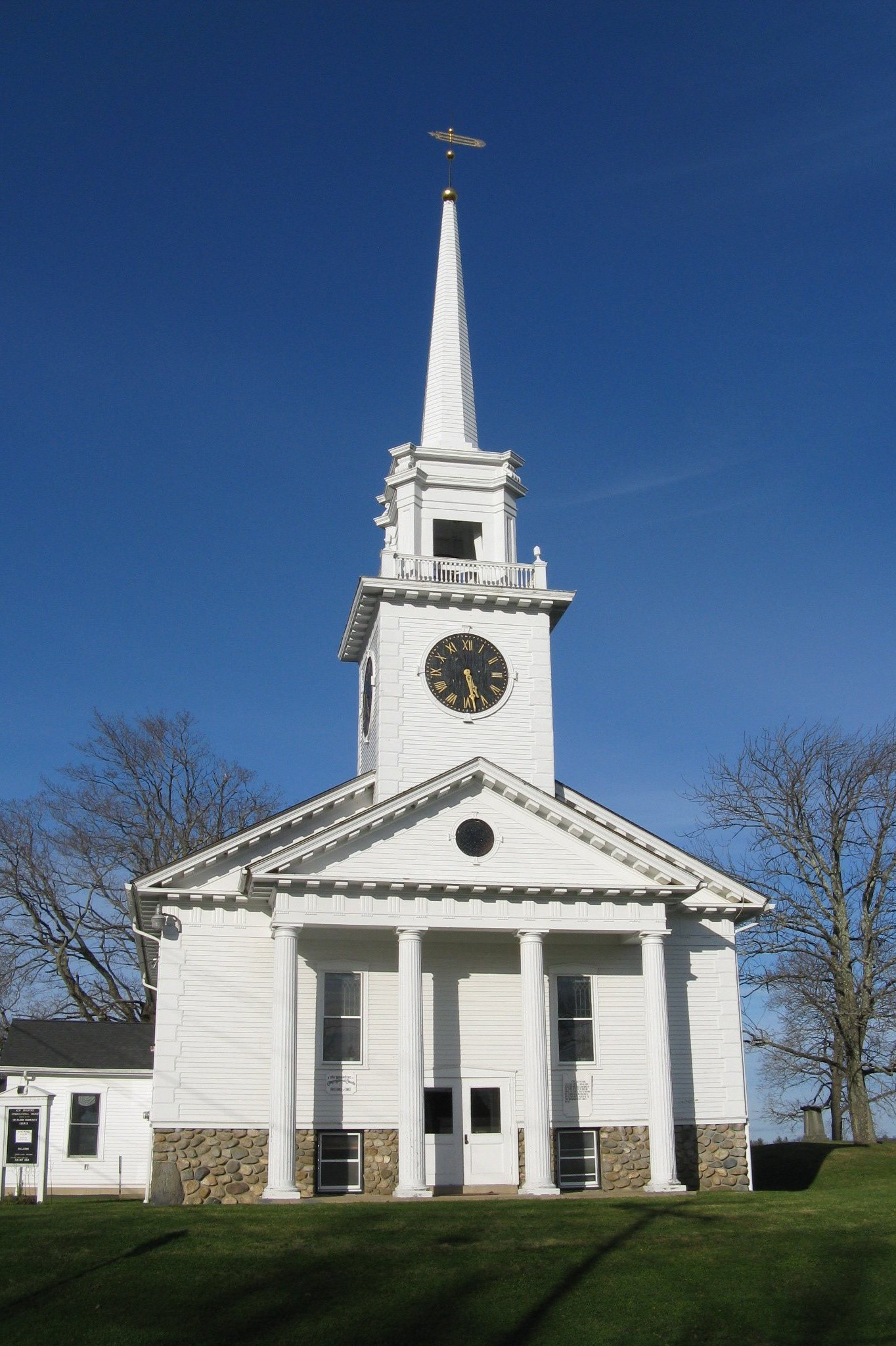
Congregational Church New Braintree, MA

== Personal life ==
Married: Sarah Fisk Loring, December 2, 1736

== Gallery ==
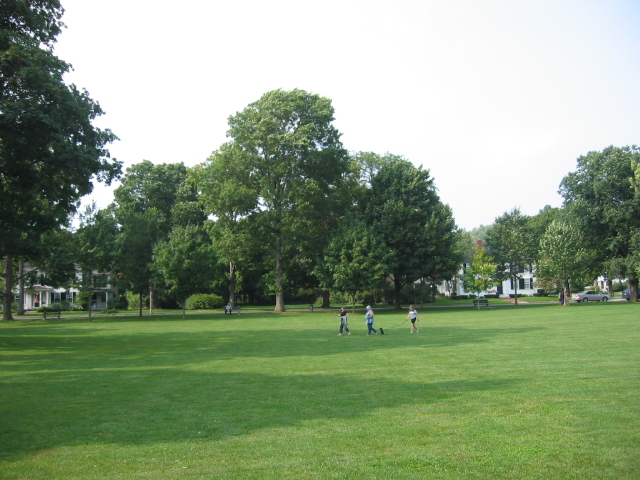
Lexington Green in modern times

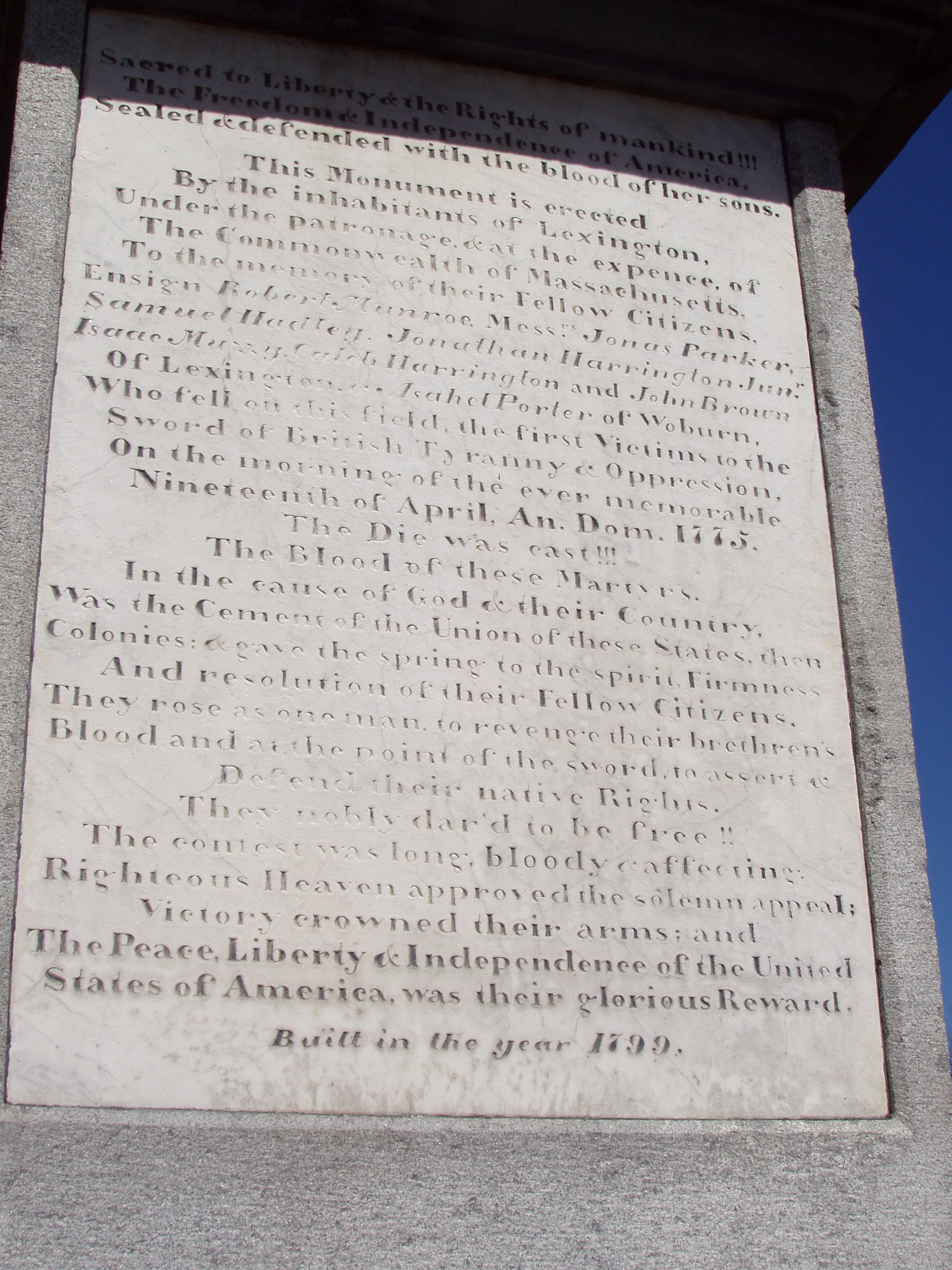
Inscription on the Revolutionary monument

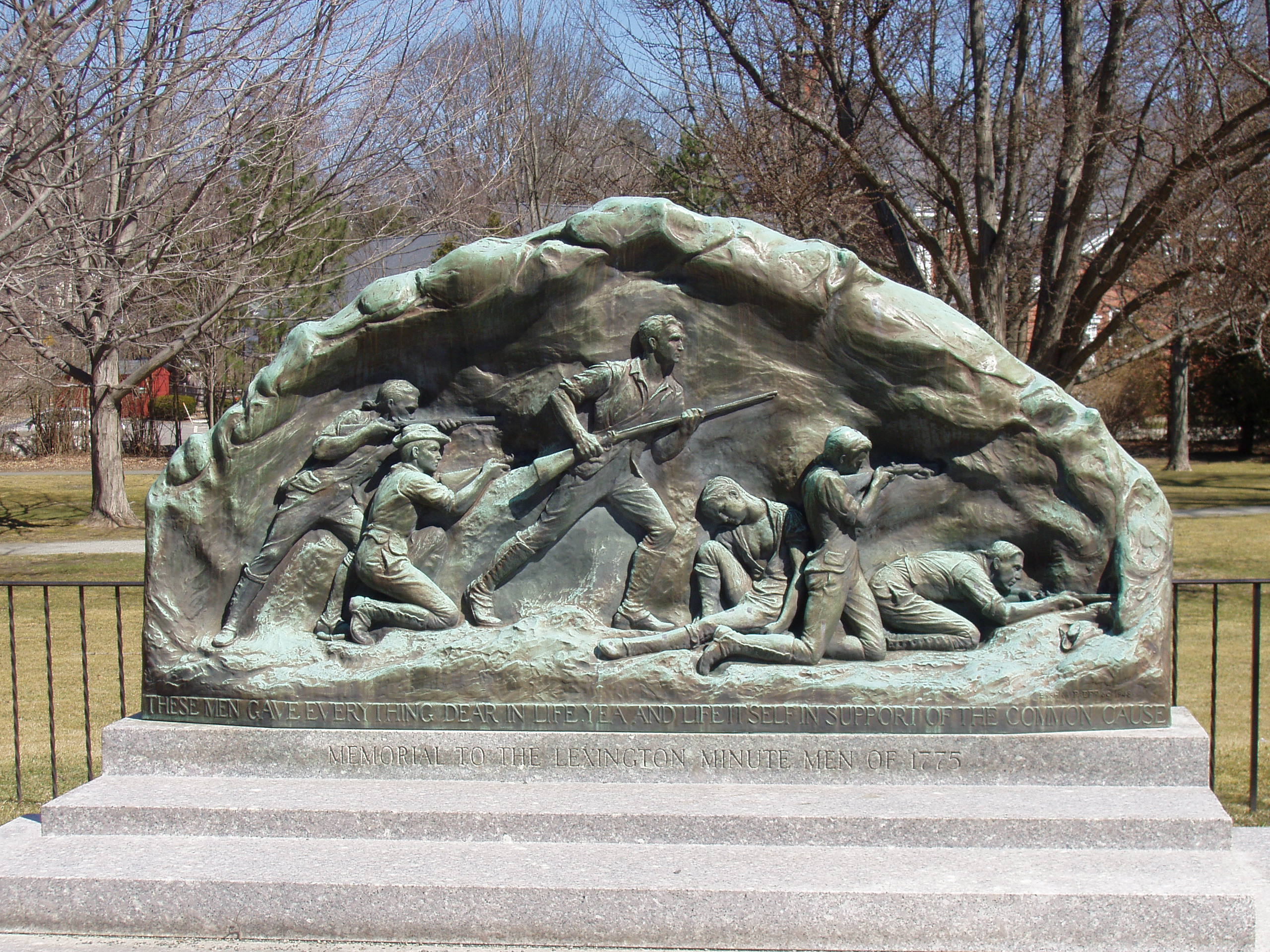
Lexington Minutemen relief by Bashka Paeff

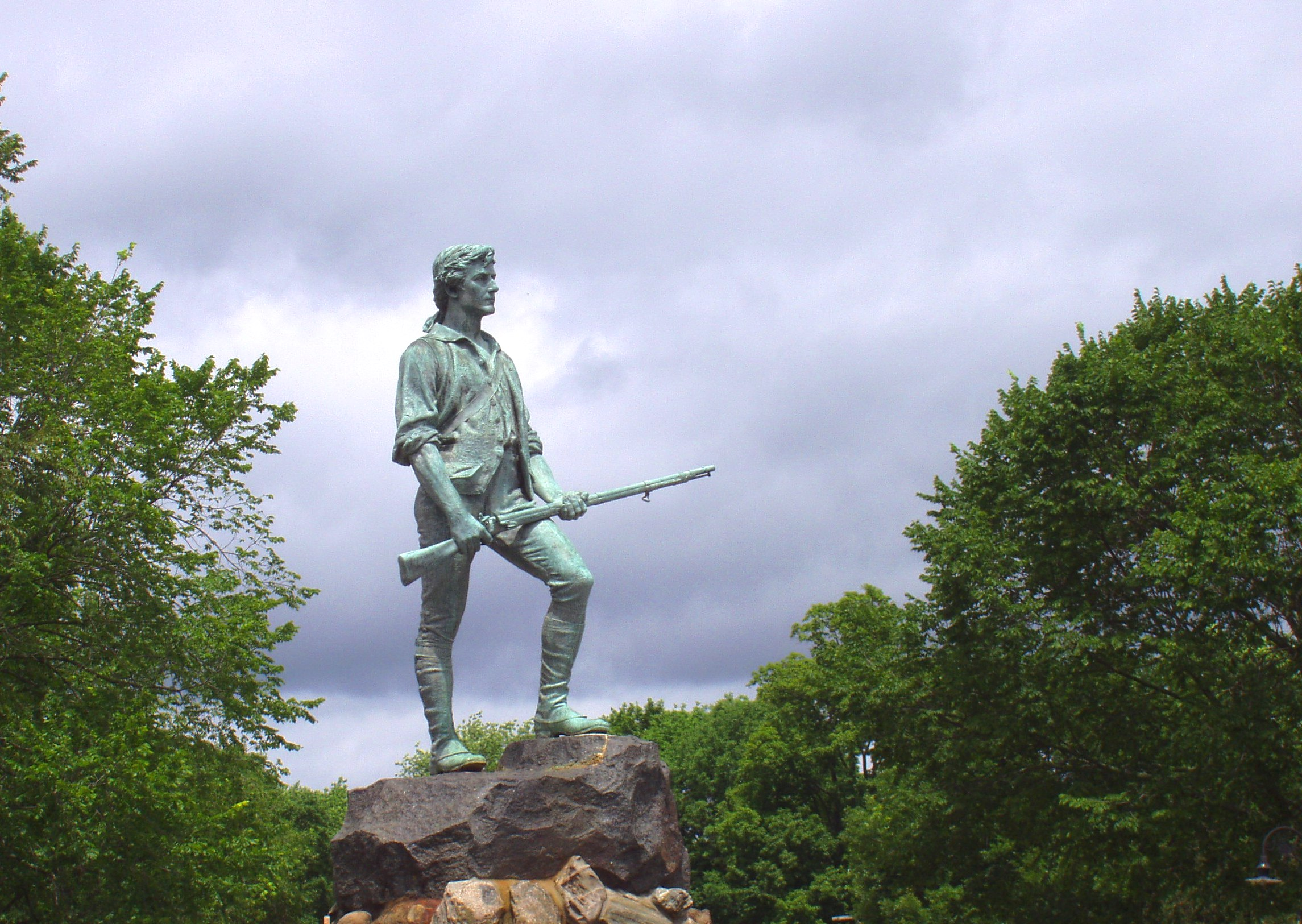
The Minuteman Statue at Lexington. It is also referred to as a statue of Capt. John Parker, although no contemporary image of him exists. However, a physical description of him by his grandson, Theodore Parker, does exist, and the statue generally fits that description.
