= Loyal Nine =

Nine Bostonians who organized demonstrations against the Stamp Act 1765

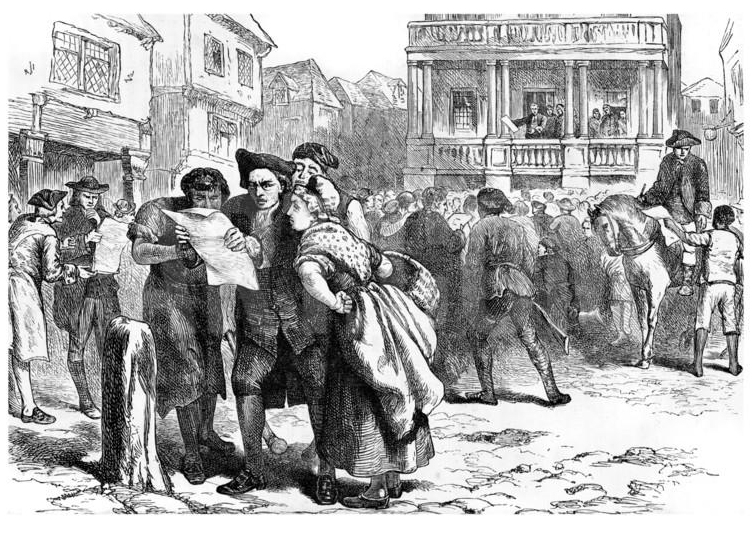
Bostonians Reading the Stamp Act from Stranger's Illustrated Guide to Boston and Its Suburbs by J. H. Stark, 1882

The Loyal Nine (also spelled Loyall Nine) were nine American patriots from Boston, who met secretly to plan protests against the Stamp Act 1765 in the beginning of the American Revolution. Mostly middle class businessmen, the Loyal Nine enlisted Ebenezer Mackintosh to rally large crowds of commoners to their cause and provided the protesters with food, drink, and supplies.

A precursor to the Sons of Liberty, the group is credited with establishing the Liberty Tree as a central gathering place for Boston patriots.

== History ==
=== Stamp Act protests ===
Following the Stamp Act 1765 was passed in March 1765, the Loyal Nine began meeting at the office of the Boston Gazette with the goal of preventing the act from taking effect that November. In August, they found a mob captain among the common people to do their bidding: a shoemaker by the name of Ebenezer Mackintosh.

Mackintosh already had experience leading unruly mobs. Once a year on November 5, Boston's lower classes celebrated Pope Night, an anti-Catholic holiday in which rival gangs from the North and South Ends battled for the honor of burning an effigy of the pope. As the leader of the South End gang, Mackintosh could easily gather two or three thousand men on short notice. The Loyal Nine arranged for the gangs to unite in protest against the Stamp Act, with Mackintosh as their leader. The officers of the group were wined, dined, and outfitted by John Hancock and other local merchants.

Under the direction of the Loyal Nine, Mackintosh led two mob actions that August, two more in November, and another in December. The first of these protests took place under a large elm tree in Hanover Square near the Chase and Speakman distillery. The tree became known as the Liberty Tree, and was a central gathering place for speeches, processions, and the hanging of effigies. The businessmen took care to keep their own identities secret and let Mackintosh take responsibility for the actions of the mob. Henry Bass, one of the Loyal Nine, admitted as much in a December 1765 letter:

We do everything in order to keep this and the first Affair Private: and are not a little pleas'd to hear that McIntosh has the Credit of the whole Affair.

Members of the Loyal Nine may have participated in the Stamp Act protests along with Mackintosh and his mob. Witnesses reported seeing "gentlemen" dressed as workmen in the crowd, and one witness saw a rioter's trouser leg slide up, revealing silk stockings.

The businessmen later distanced themselves from Mackintosh. Some felt he had allowed the protests to become too violent, particularly the August 26 raid that destroyed the home of Lieutenant Governor Thomas Hutchinson. Fearing Mackintosh was another "Masaniello," an Italian fisherman who had led a proletarian rebellion in the 17th century, they replaced him with Thomas Young and William Molineaux, members of their own social circle.

=== Later activities ===
The Loyal Nine all became active members of the Sons of Liberty. By some accounts, they were the leaders of the organization in its earliest days.

Loyal Nine members Henry Bass, Thomas Chase, and Benjamin Edes became members of the North End Caucus, a political group reputedly involved in the planning of the Boston Tea Party. John Avery, Thomas Chase, Steven Cleverly, and Thomas Crafts attended the planning meeting. It was held in a small counting room above Chase and Speakman's distillery. At the actual event, Bass, Chase, Crafts, and Edes actively participated in the destruction of British East India Company tea.

== Members ==
According to the Boston Tea Party Museum, the nine members were:

- John Avery, distiller; club secretary
- Henry Bass, merchant, seller of grindstones; a cousin of Samuel Adams
- Thomas Chase, distiller
- Steven Cleverly, brazier
- Thomas Crafts, painter and Japanner
- Benjamin Edes, printer of the Boston Gazette; a friend of Samuel Adams
- Joseph Field, ship captain
- John Smith, brazier
- George Trott, jeweller

Samuel Adams, who is often credited with founding the Sons of Liberty, was not a member of the Loyal Nine, but often met with them. Several other men are thought to have been involved with the group at one time or another:

- John Adams, lawyer
- Chase Avery, distiller
- Benjamin Church, medical doctor
- William Cooper, town clerk
- Solomon Davis, merchant
- John Gill, co-owner of the Boston Gazette
- John Hancock, merchant
- Zachariah Johonnot, distiller. Father of Lt. Col. Gabriel Johonnot, Continental Army.
- John Mackay, merchant
- William Molineaux, merchant
- James Otis, lawyer
- William Phillips, lawyer
- Paul Revere, silversmith and engraver
- John Rowe, merchant
- John Scollay, selectman and town council chairman
- Joseph Warren, medical doctor
- Henry Welles, ship captain
- Thomas Young, medical doctor

== See also ==
- Bathsheba Spooner
