= Martha Wadsworth Brewster =

American poet

- Born: April 1, 1710; Lebanon, Connecticut
- Died: c. 1757 (aged 46–47) possibly Lebanon, Connecticut
- Occupations: Poet and writer
- Notable work: Poems on Diverse Subjects
- Spouse: Oliver Brewster
- Children: 2
- Relatives: Robert Noyce; Diane Brewster

Martha Wadsworth Brewster (April 1, 1710 – c. 1757) was an 18th-century American poet and writer. She is one of only four colonial women who published volumes of their verse before the American Revolution and was the first American-born woman to publish under her own name.

== Biography ==
=== Early life ===
She was born on April 1, 1710 in Lebanon, Connecticut, a daughter of Joseph Wadsworth, Jr. and the granddaughter of Joseph Wadsworth, Sr. and Abigail Waite. Her mother was Lydia Brown, whose parents were Captain John Brown of Swansea, Massachusetts, and Anna Mason.

=== Marriage ===
She married, at an undetermined place, on Wednesday, March 22, 1732, Oliver Brewster, who was born at Duxbury, Massachusetts, on July 16, 1708, the son of William Brewster and Hopestill Wadsworth. Oliver died, possibly in Bernardston, Massachusetts, sometime after October 19, 1776, as this is the date when he deeded land in Lebanon, Connecticut, to his son, Wadsworth.

=== Children ===
They were the parents of two children. Their son, Wadsworth Brewster, born April 14, 1737, at Lebanon, New London County, Connecticut and died at Columbia, Tolland County, Connecticut, on March 30, 1812. He married on May 24, 1759, at the Second Congregational Church at Lebanon, Connecticut, by the Rev. Dr. Eleazar Wheelock, Jerusha Newcomb, born January 6, 1740/41 at Lebanon, Connecticut the daughter of Silas Newcomb and Submit Pinneo. She died on February 9, 1813, at Chatham, New York.

Their daughter was Ruby Brewster, born January 5, 1733/34 at Lebanon, New London County, Connecticut, and died at an unknown date in Bernardston, Massachusetts. She married on December 22, 1749, at Longmeadow, Massachusetts, Henry Bliss. He was born on August 21, 1726, at Lebanon, Connecticut and died on February 8, 1761. He was the son of Thomas Bliss and Mary Macranney.

=== Death ===
Martha Wadsworth Brewster died sometime after 1757, possibly at Lebanon, Connecticut. Her husband, Oliver, had relocated to Bernardston, Massachusetts prior to October 28, 1765 and she is not mentioned in any of the records in that town. The location of her grave is unknown. Nothing is known of her early life or education and her life remains an enigma.

=== Career ===
She was one of a handful of American women poets who produced imaginative verse in the two centuries that mark the beginning of an American poetic literary tradition. Previous colonial American women poets, Anne Bradstreet and Jane Colman Turell, focused primarily on religion and family life. Brewster's 21 poems vary widely in theme and form: the more than 1100 lines include letters, farewells to friends who are moving, epithalamiums, eulogies, scriptural paraphrases, a love poem, a quaternion, a dream (in prose), and meditations.

While she does write about more conventional religious and family themes, her work is also the first to tackle radical subject matter for a woman of the eighteenth-century and reflects a shift from those themes to focus on the evils of war, military invasion and conquest and its cumulative effect on a nation and its citizens; and locates a woman's voice alongside those of the male founders of the country. She also writes about the schisms of the Great Awakening, and the muted stirring of personal ambition as well. Despite the traditional attitude toward women of the time, she clearly valued knowledge and intellect; and she could be considered an early feminist.

== Works ==
Her principal work, Poems on Divers Subjects, which does appear to pay homage to Bradstreet's verse, contains poems, prose, and letters. Perhaps because she exactingly examined topics that were considered outside both the experience and the ability of 18th-century women, a doubting public pressed her to authenticate her ability and to demonstrate her authorship to a public skeptical that a woman could write poetry by publicly paraphrasing a psalm into verse. She was accused of "borrowing her Poetry from Isaac Watts and others." In a later poem of hers, she included a line that reads "Ye Creatures all, in vast Amazement Stand" evinces some trace of personal nuance aimed at those who had attempted to depreciate her competence as a poet.

Many of her works appeared on broadsides an early type of publication that resembled the modern-day flyer. In addition, she commemorated historical events in her poetry; in 1745, she set to meter a piece describing the capture of Cape Breton from the French by the British.

In Delight in Reading, she instructed her daughter, Ruby, "You must go on by Reading and Study to improve the Powers which God has given you."

She composed two acrostic poems of advice for her young children. The below poem is the one composed for her son, Wadsworth. (Note: An Acrostic for my only Son "While Amorous, Gay, and Sanguine swells thy Veins, "An Off’ring of first Fruits, Jehovah Claims. "Due Odours of a sweet Perfume Present, "Steep’d in the Blood of the new Covenant; "What vulgar Notes Applaud, must be Suspected; "Obedience to the Standard ne’er Neglected; "Retire within the Mind, and shut the Door, "To all disord’red Passions, Rude and Sow’r, "Here summons, and exert each Manly Pow’r. "By Adequate, and Studious Observation, "Rise to the Poles, then dive to Navigation. "Early enrich thy Heart with moral Virtues, "Whereby to rectify inverted Nature: "Survey the Globe of Man, then turn thine Eyes "To search through Nature’s obscure Mysteries; "Envy may Hiss in Vain, at virt’ous Minds, "Regent in her own Breast, she sits Enshrin’d)

No single volume of her work is extant. There is no recorded response to Brewster's Poems documenting the volume's reception, but it appeared in two editions, one printed in New London, Connecticut (1757), and another printed in Boston (1758). Both editions of her works were printed by publishers Benjamin Edes and John Gill of Boston, Massachusetts. Such reprinting suggests an audience well beyond Brewster's immediate circle of family and friends.

== Descendants ==
Descendants of Oliver Brewster and Martha Wadsworth include:

- David Brewster, is an American journalist.
- Diane Brewster, was an American television actress most famous for her roles in Maverick, as Miss Canfield in Leave It to Beaver and as Helen Kimble in The Fugitive 1963 TV series.
- Greg Camp, is an American Grammy Award-nominated songwriter, guitarist and vocalist.
- Charles Champlin, is an American film critic and writer.
- Joseph M. Champlin, was a Roman Catholic priest, author, and lecturer.
- George Trumbull Ladd, was an American philosopher and psychologist.
- William Peabody Malburn was a lawyer and banker and later served as United States Assistant Secretary of the Treasury in charge of fiscal affairs, 1914–1917.
- Robert Noyce, nicknamed "the Mayor of Silicon Valley", was the inventor of the integrated circuit or microchip.
- Henry Farnham Perkins, was an American zoologist and eugenicist.
- Matthew Laflin Rockwell, (1915–1988) was an American architect who was responsible for the site selection, plan and design of O'Hare International Airport.
