= Liberty Tree =

Elm tree in Boston, Massachusetts (1646–1775)

Coordinates: 42°21′09″N 71°03′45″W

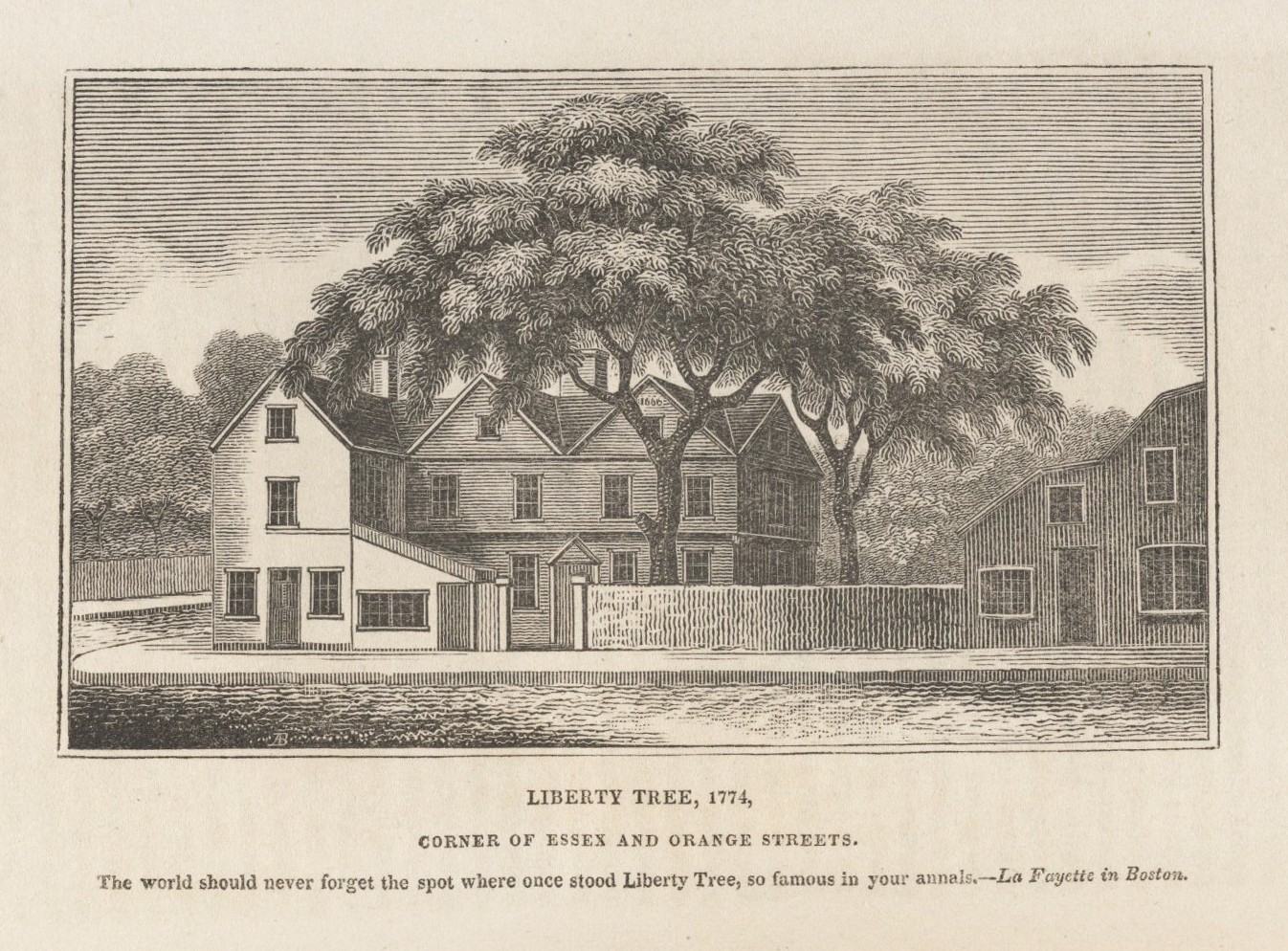
The Liberty Tree in Boston, illustrated in 1825

The Liberty Tree (1646–1775) was a famous elm tree that stood in Boston, Massachusetts, near the Boston Common in the years before the American Revolution. In 1765, Patriots in Boston staged the first act of defiance against the British government at the tree. The tree became a rallying point for the growing resistance to the rule of Britain over the American colonies, and the ground surrounding it became known as Liberty Hall. The Liberty Tree was felled in August 1775 by Loyalists led by Nathaniel Coffin Jr. or by Job Williams.

== History ==
=== Stamp Act protests ===
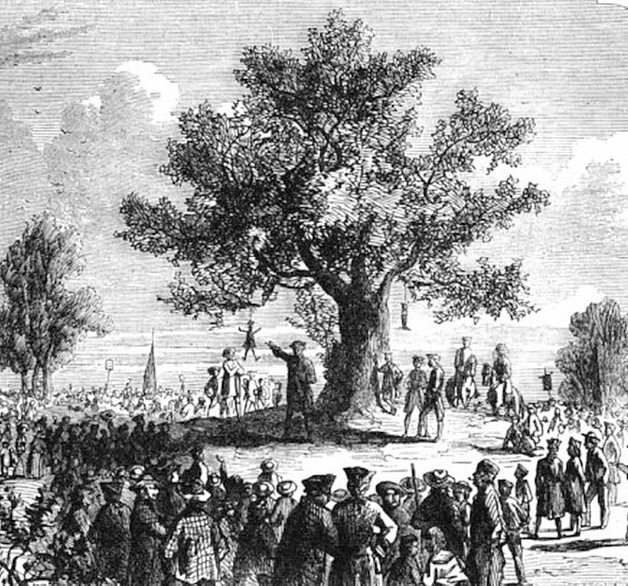
"The Colonists Under Liberty Tree," Cassell's Illustrated History of England, 1865

In 1765, the British Parliament introduced the Stamp Act, which was directed at Britain's American colonies. It required all legal documents, permits, commercial contracts, newspapers, pamphlets, and playing cards in the American colonies to carry a tax stamp. The act was met with widespread anger in the colonies, and in Boston a group of businessmen calling themselves the Loyal Nine began meeting in secret to plan a series of protests against it.

On August 14, 1765, a crowd gathered in Boston under a large elm tree at the corner of Essex Street and Orange Street to protest the Stamp Act. Hanging from the tree was a straw-stuffed effigy labeled "A. O." for Andrew Oliver, the Secretary of Massachusetts, Boston's appointed stamped-paper distributor, and stamp tax collector. Beside it hung a boot with its sole painted green. This second effigy represented two members of the Grenville ministry who were considered responsible for the Stamp Act: the Earl of Bute (the boot being a pun on "Bute") and George Grenville (the green being a pun on "Grenville"). Peering up from inside the boot was a small devil figure holding a copy of the Stamp Act and bearing a sign that read: "What Greater Joy did ever New England see / Than a Stampman hanging on a Tree!" This was the first public show of defiance against the Crown and spawned the resistance that led to the American Revolutionary War 10 years later.

The tree became a central gathering place for protesters, and the ground surrounding it became popularly known as Liberty Hall. A liberty pole was installed nearby with a flag that could be raised above the tree to summon the townspeople to a meeting. Ebenezer Mackintosh was a shoemaker who handled much of the hands-on work of hanging effigies and leading angry mobs, and he became known as "Captain General of the Liberty Tree." Paul Revere included the Liberty Tree in an engraving, "A View of the Year 1765".

When the Stamp Act was repealed in 1766, townspeople gathered at the Liberty Tree to celebrate. They decorated the tree with flags and streamers and hung dozens of lanterns from its branches when darkness fell. A copper sign was fastened to the trunk which read, "This tree was planted in the year 1646, and pruned by order of the Sons of Liberty, Feb. 14th, 1766." Soon colonists in other towns began naming their own liberty trees, from Newport, Rhode Island to Charleston, South Carolina, and the Tree of Liberty became a familiar symbol of the American Revolution.

=== Other protests ===
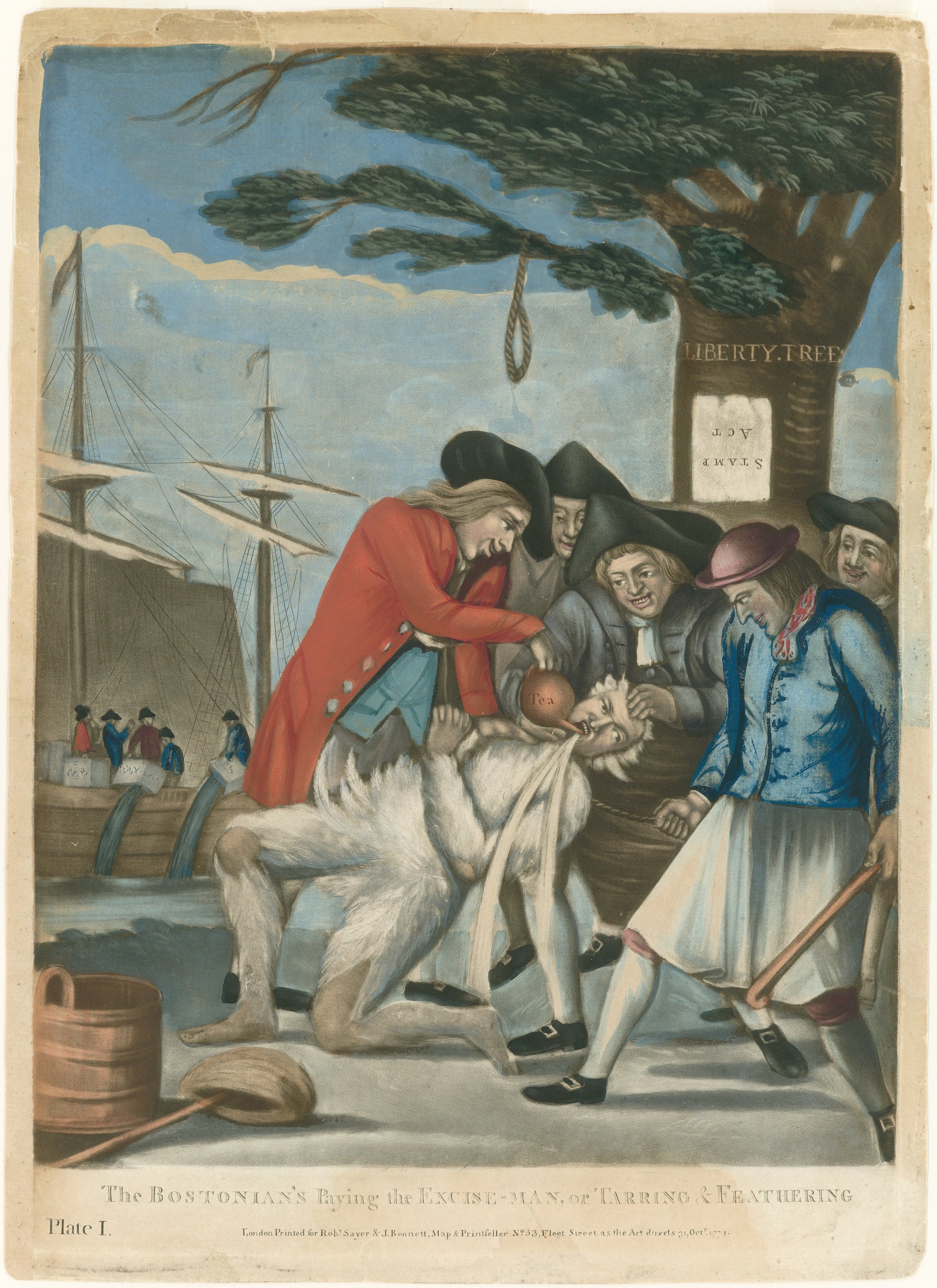
The Sons of Liberty tarring and feathering John Malcolm under the Liberty Tree

The Loyal Nine eventually became part of the Sons of Liberty. They continued to use the Liberty Tree as a gathering place for protests, leading loyalist Peter Oliver to write bitterly in 1781:

This Tree stood in the Town, & was consecrated for an Idol for the Mob to Worship; it was properly the Tree ordeal, where those, whom the Rioters pitched upon as State delinquents, were carried to for Trial, or brought to as the Test of political Orthodoxy.

Townspeople dragged a customs commissioner's boat out of the harbor all the way to the Liberty Tree during the Liberty Riot of 1768, protesting the seizure of John Hancock's ship by Boston customs officials. The commissioner's boat was condemned at a mock trial and burned on Boston Common. Two years later, a funeral procession for the victims of the Boston Massacre passed by the tree. It was also the site of protests against the Tea Act. In 1774, a customs official and staunch loyalist named John Malcolm was stripped to the waist, tarred and feathered, and forced to announce his resignation under the tree. The following year, Thomas Paine published an ode to the Liberty Tree in The Pennsylvania Gazette. In March 1775, Thomas Ditson of Billerica, Massachusetts attempted to illegally purchase the Brown Bess musket of a soldier of the 47th Regiment of Foot. After a group of the soldier's comrades spotted the transaction as it was occurring, they tarred and feathered Ditson and forced him to march in front of the tree in order to prevent such transactions from happening in the future.

=== Felling ===
In April 1775, colonial forces barricaded Boston Neck in the Siege of Boston, including the Common and the Liberty Tree. Only British troops and a small number of Loyalist merchants remained on the Neck, and sometime between August 28 and 31, a party of Loyalists led by Nathaniel Coffin Jr. or by Job Williams cut down the tree and used it for firewood. One soldier was killed in the process.

Following the British evacuation of Boston in 1776, patriots returning to the city erected a liberty pole at the site. For many years, the tree stump was used as a reference point by local citizens, similar to the Boston Stone. During an 1825 tour of Boston, the Marquis de Lafayette declared, "The world should never forget the spot where once stood Liberty Tree, so famous in your annals."

== Memorials ==
Original plaque over where the historic Liberty Tree once stood

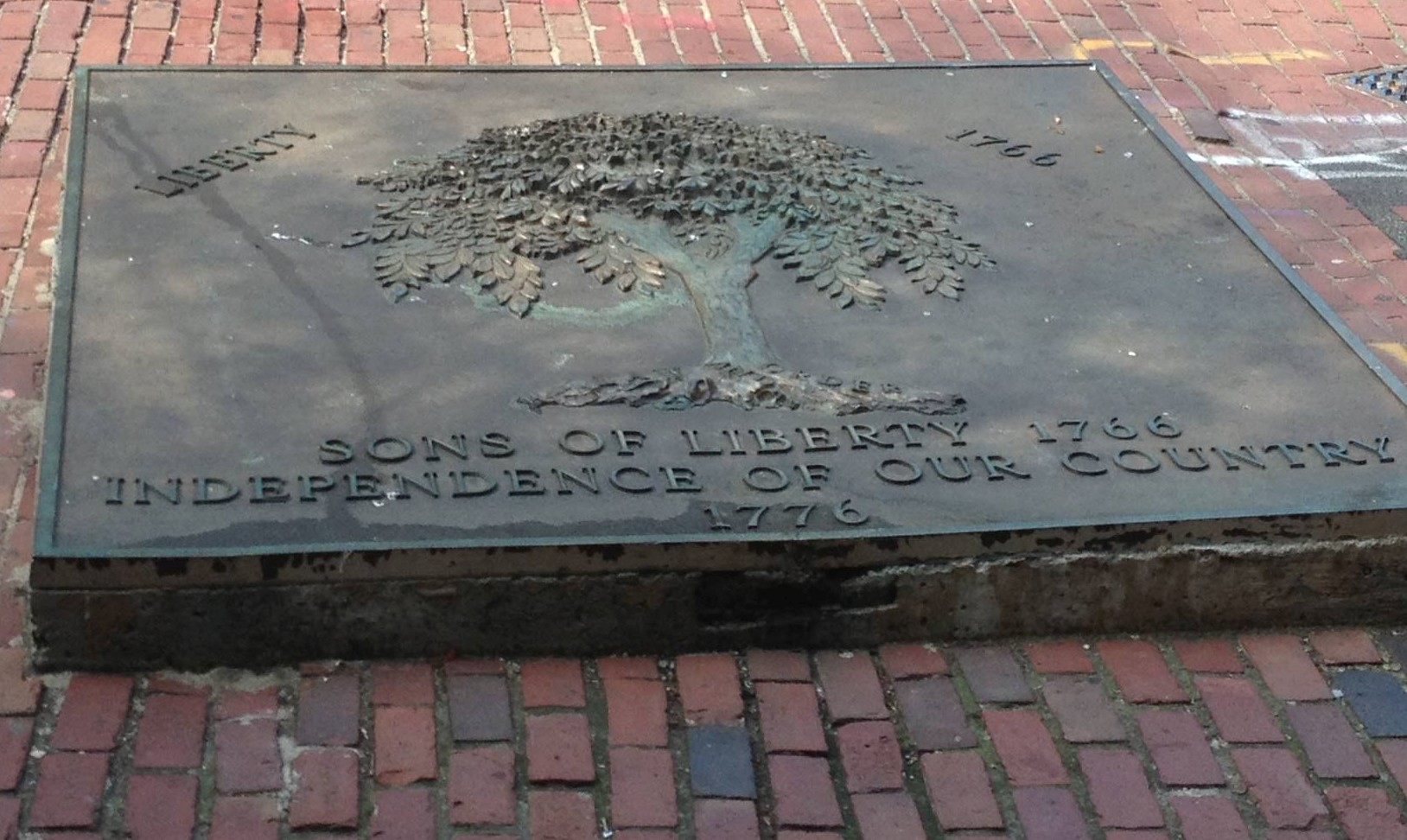
New bronze plaque on Liberty Tree Plaza in Boston

At the 1964 New York World's Fair, a sculpture of the tree designed by Albert Surman was a featured exhibit in the New England Pavilion. When the Liberty Tree Mall was opened in 1972, the sculpture was installed at center court.

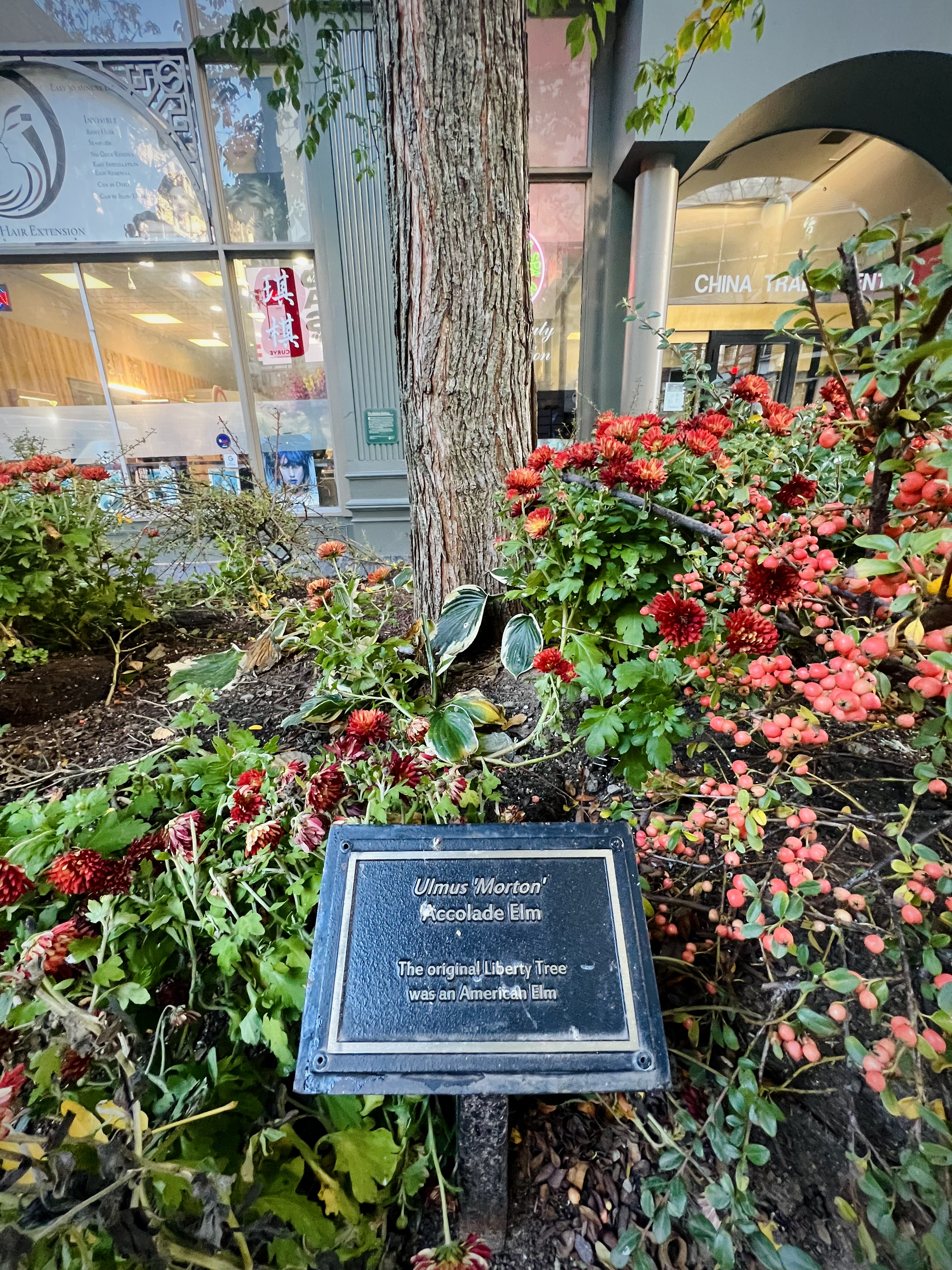
Accolade Elm commemorating the American Elm Liberty Tree, 2022

In October 1966, the Boston Herald began running stories pointing out that the only commemoration of the Liberty Tree site was a grimy plaque installed in the 1850s on a building at 630 Washington Street, three stories above the intersection of Essex and Washington Streets. Reporter Ronald Kessler found that the plaque was covered with bird droppings and obscured by a Kemp's hamburger sign. Local guidebooks did not mention it. To call attention to how obscure the site had become, Kessler interviewed waitresses at the Essex Delicatessen below the bas relief plaque on Washington Street. None knew what the Liberty Tree was. "The Liberty Tree? That's a roast beef sandwich with a slice of Bermuda onion, Russian dressing, and a side of potato salad," said one waitress who had worked beneath the plaque for 20 years. Kessler persuaded Massachusetts Governor John A. Volpe to visit the site. A photo of Volpe examining the plaque from a fire engine ladder appeared on page one of the October 6, 1966 edition of the Boston Herald.

In 1974, funding was approved for a small park at Washington and Essex, which was part of an area known as the Combat Zone at the time. Plans to plant trees there had to be scrapped because there were too many underground utilities. The Boston Redevelopment Authority ultimately placed a small bronze plaque in the sidewalk across the street from the bas relief plaque. The plaque bears the inscription "SONS OF LIBERTY, 1766; INDEPENDENCE of their COUNTRY, 1776."

In December 2018, the city opened Liberty Tree Plaza at 2 Boylston Street, across the street from the original bas relief. The plaza has tables and chairs, landscaping, lighting, an elm tree to commemorate the original tree cut down in 1775 before the outbreak of the American Revolutionary War, and a stone monument inscribed with the history of the Liberty Tree. The Liberty Tree "became a rallying point for colonists protesting the British-imposed Stamp Act in 1765 and became an important symbol of their cause," the inscription says. "These 'Sons of Liberty' began the struggle that led to the Revolutionary War and American independence." Boston's Old State House museum houses one of the flags that flew above the Liberty Tree, and one of the original lanterns hung from the tree during the Stamp Act repeal celebration in 1766.

== Other trees ==
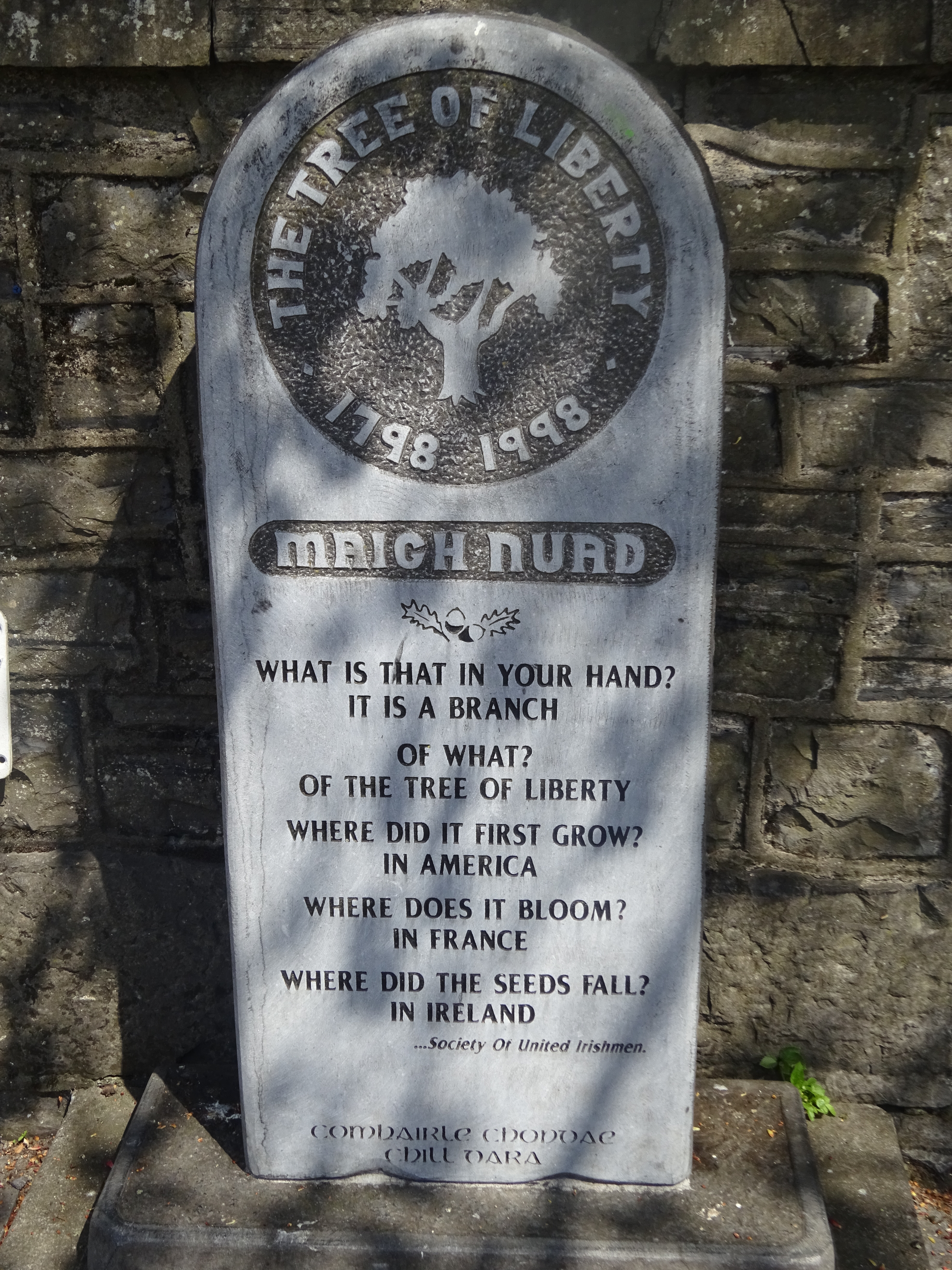
Tree of Liberty monument in Maynooth, Ireland, commemorating the Irish Rebellion of 1798, which was inspired by the American and French Revolutions

Many other towns designated their own Liberty Trees. Most have been lost over time, although Randolph, New Jersey claims a white oak Liberty Tree dating to 1720. A 400 year-old tulip poplar stood on the grounds of St. John's College in Annapolis, Maryland until 1999, when it was felled after Hurricane Floyd caused irreparable damage to it. The Liberty Tree in Acton, Massachusetts was an elm tree that lasted until about 1925. Acton students planted the Peace Tree in 1915, a maple that still stands today.

=== French Revolution ===
The Arbres de la liberté ("Liberty Trees") were a symbol of the French Revolution, the first being planted in 1790 by a pastor of a Vienne village, inspired by the Liberty Tree of Boston. The last surviving liberty elm in France stands in the parish of La Madeleine at Faycelles in the Département de Lot. Liberty trees were also planted on the Place Royale in Brussels on July 9, 1794 after the occupation of the Austrian Netherlands by French revolutionary forces, and on Dam Square in Amsterdam on January 19, 1795 in celebration of the alliance between the French Republic and the Batavian Republic.

A liberty tree was also planted in Rome's Piazza delle Scole in 1798 to mark the legal abolition of the Roman Ghetto (which was, however, re-instated with the resumption of Papal rule). The last surviving liberty elm in Italy, planted in 1799 to celebrate the new Parthenopean Republic, stood until recently in Montepaone, Calabria. The tree was badly damaged in a storm in 2008 and has been replaced by a clone.

=== Thomas Jefferson ===
Besides actual trees, the term "Tree of Liberty" is associated with a quotation from a 1787 letter written by Thomas Jefferson to William Stephens Smith: "The tree of liberty must be refreshed from time to time with the blood of patriots and tyrants."

== See also ==
- "Liberty Tree", a poem by Thomas Paine (Wikisource)
- Pine Tree Flag, sometimes called the Liberty Tree Flag
- Liberty Generation
- List of elm trees
- List of individual trees
- Sir Francis Bernard, 1st Baronet
