= Peter Edes =

American printer (1756–1840)

- Born: December 17, 1756; Boston, Province of Massachusetts Bay
- Died: March 30, 1840 (aged 83); Bangor, Maine
- Resting place: Mount Hope Cemetery, Bangor
- Occupation: printer
- Works: Boston Gazette, Newport Herald, Kennebec Intelligencer
- Parent: Benjamin Edes

Peter Edes (Note: Sometimes spelled as Eades) (December 17, 1756 – March 30, 1840) was a colonial American patriot and printer and an advocate of American independence before and during the American Revolution, during which he was arrested for his show of support for the patriots. After the war, he moved his shop to Boston, then to Rhode Island, and again to the District of Maine, where he became the first printer to establish a printing house.

== Early life and family ==
Edes was born in 1756 in Boston, Province of Massachusetts Bay. He received his basic education at the Boston Latin School. Peter Edes' great-grandfather, John Edes, emigrated from Lawford, England, and met and married Mary (Tufts) Edes on October 15, 1674. They had a son, also named John, who married Grace Lawrence, and became the parents of Peter Edes, the elder, and resided in Charlestown, Massachusetts, who died in 1787. Their second son, Benjamin, was Peter's father.

All persons of the name Edeas or Eades living in America in the 18th century were descendants of John and Mary Edes. Their son, Peter, was a subscriber to Thomas Prince's 1736 work, the New England Annals. As an English family, they were entitled to use the family coat of arms, but the American family resented the tyranny of England and broke off all association with the English and the mother country.

== Printing career ==
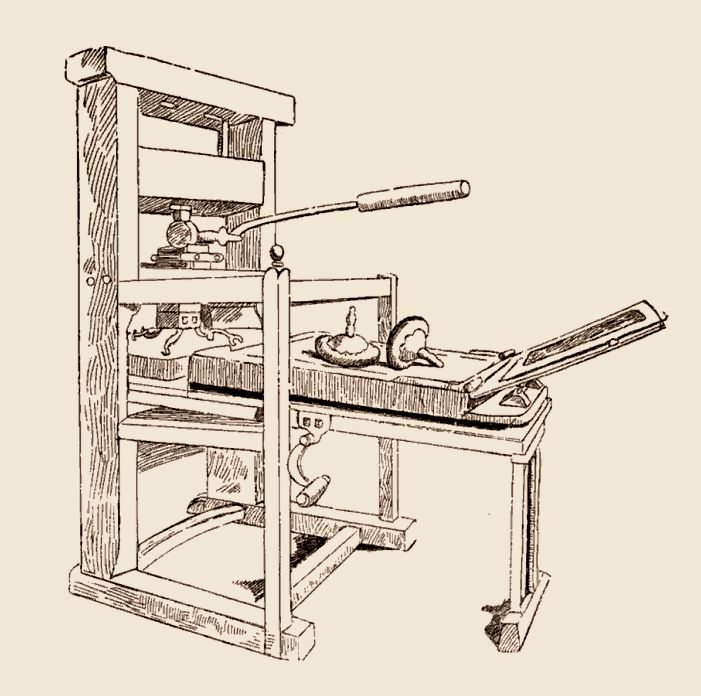
Etching of Peter Edes' printing press

Peter Edes was a printer's apprentice to his father, Benjamin Edes, who, with John Gill, printed the radical newspaper The Boston Gazette, which was fundamental in instigating the Boston Tea Party, and overall, played a major role in rallying the cause for independence.

When the American Revolutionary War was approaching Edes was an outspoken advocate of American independence. Edes was arrested by General Thomas Gage two days after the Battle of Bunker Hill and was taken prisoner to Boston, on June 19, 1775, after he drew attention to himself from British Regulars by watching the Battle of Bunker Hill with what his diary described as "anxious and tearful eyes" for the American soldiers. His house was subsequently searched where British forces discovered a concealed cache of firearms, for which he was imprisoned 107 days. Edes had already attracted their attention in April when he stood on Beacon Hill and watched the British retreat from the Battle of Lexington while making no effort to conceal his joy. While serving his sentence he maintained a diary, which reveals the cruelty that prisoners were subjected to. He was one of the participants at the Boston Tea Party.

In 1779, Benjamin Edes formed a partnership with his two sons Peter and Benjamin and established the printing firm of Benjamin Edes & Sons who continued publication of The Boston Gazette, from 1779 to 1784. About three years later Peter began business for himself in Boston, but was not very successful.

After the American colonies won their independence, Edes established a printing shop in Boston. He then removed to Newport, Rhode Island, on March 1, 1787, and published the Newport Herald. In 1796 he removed to Augusta, Maine, and became the first printer to establish a printing house in the District of Maine, and where in 1797 he published The Kennebec Intelligencer. The first issue appeared November 14, 1795. In 1796 there were only three newspapers published in Maine: The Eastern Herald and Gazette of Maine, at Portland; The Kennebec Intelligencer and the Tocsin, both published in Hallowell. By 1800 the population of Maine was approximately 152,000. By this time there were only five weekly newspapers, viz, The Portland Gazette, The Eastern Herald, and Oriental Trumpet, all printed at Portland; The Kennebec Intelligencer, at Hallowell; The Castine Journal, at Castine. In 1815 the population had rapidly grown to 250,000. By that time all the above named newspapers, with the exception of The Portland Gazette, had ceased publication and were soon replaced by others. Edes afterward lived in Hallowell and finally settled in Bangor where he eventually died.

== See also ==
- Early American publishers and printers
- List of early American publishers and printers
- Colonial history of the United States

== Bibliography ==
- Edes, Peter (1901). Samuel Lane Boardman (ed.). Peter Edes, Pioneer Printer in Maine : a Biography : His Diary While a Prisoner by the British at Boston in 1775. De Burians.
- Wilson, James Grant; Fiske, John, eds. (1892). Appletons' cyclopedia of American biography. Vol. II. New York, D. Appleton and Company.
- Griffin, Joseph (1872). History of the press of Maine. Brunswick : The Press, established A.D. MDCCCXIX.
- Thomas, Isaiah (1874). The history of printing in America, with a biography of printers. Vol. I. New York, B. Franklin.
- Wroth, Lawrence C. (1938). The Colonial Printer. Portland, Me., The Southworth-Anthoensen press.
- "Peter Edes, Apprentice Printer, Imprisoned by the British". New England Historical Society. June 19, 2014.
