= Rollo G. Silver =

American literary historian (1909–1989)

Rollo Gabriel Silver (June 27, 1909 – September 20, 1989) was an American literary historian.

Silver was born on June 27, 1909, in New York City, to Anna (Newman) and Stanley Gabriel Silver.

He attended Brown University, graduating in 1931. He then received a master's in English from Boston University in 1941 and a bachelor's in library science from Simmons College (now Simmons University) in 1948.

Silver was a librarian at a place called the Peabody Institute in Boston (not to be confused with other Peabody Institutes) from 1948 to 1950, after which he taught at Simmons. With his wife Alice Gindin, whom he married on June 9, 1933, Silver compiled a set of manuscripts and other works related to Walt Whitman.

Silver died on September 20, 1989.

== Publications ==
- Typefounding in America, 1787–1825 (University of Virginia Press, 1965)
- The American Printer, 1787–1825 (University of Virginia Press, 1967)
- Publishing in Boston, 1726–57: The Accounts of Daniel Henchman (pamphlet, University of Virginia Press, 1976)
