= Benjamin Edes =

American editor and revolutionary agitator

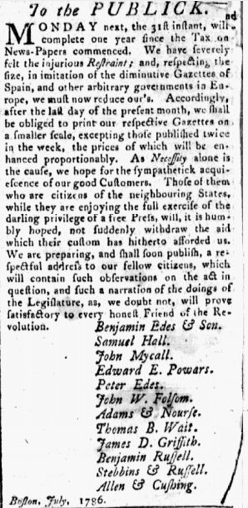
- A 1786 Newspaper clip with Benjamin Edes name on it.
- Born: October 14, 1732; Charlestown, Province of Massachusetts, British America
- Died: December 11, 1803 (aged 71); Boston, Massachusetts, U.S.
- Resting place: Copp's Hill Burying Ground, Boston
- Occupations: editor; agitator
- Known for: Boston Gazette newspaper
- Spouse: Martha Starr (1729-1806)

Benjamin Edes (October 15, 1732 – December 11, 1803) was an early American printer, publisher, newspaper journalist and a revolutionary advocate before and during the American Revolution. He is best known, along with John Gill, as the publisher of the Boston Gazette, a colonial newspaper which sparked and financed the Boston Tea Party and was influential during the American Revolutionary War.

== Early life and education ==
Edes was born on October 28, 1732, in Charlestown in the Province of Massachusetts Bay in what was then British America. He was one of seven children of Peter Edes and Esther Hall. His great-grandfather was John Edes, who was born in England, March 31. 1651, son of Rev. John Edes, rector of Lanford, Essex, and a graduate of St. John's College. He relocated to Charlestown in 1674. John was a ship carpenter and lived in Charlestown; by wife Mary Tufts, the daughter of Peter Tufts, a prominent early citizen of Medford. He had the following children: John, Edward, Mary, Peter (Benjamin's father), Jonathan and Sarah Edes.

== Marriage ==
In roughly 1754, he married Martha Starr, who was christened on June 22, 1729, at the Brattle Street Church in Boston. She was the daughter of Joseph Starr and Margaret Bulman. She was the great-great-granddaughter of Dr. Comfort Starr of Boston, who was a founder of Harvard College in 1636. Benjamin and Martha were the parents of ten children.

== Career ==
Edes established a partnership with John Gill, and together they printed various works.

Edes and Gill became the proprietors of The Boston Gazette and Country Journal on April 7, 1755. The Gazette was established on December 21, 1719, by William Brooker. Edes made the paper a leading voice favoring American independence. Edes and Gill were members of The Sons of Liberty, a revolutionary society of American patriots in Revolutionary America. Edes and Gill worked closely with Samuel Adams who employed the Boston Gazette in the publication of Adams' many revolutionary essays and letters. Andrew Oliver said, "The temper of the people may be surely learned from that infamous paper". Governor Bernard advised the arrest of both Edes and Gill as publishers of sedition.

Edes, as a member of the Loyal Nine, the directing group behind the Sons of Liberty, filled the columns of the Gazette with numerous articles criticizing the Stamp Act. He fought British policy overall through written attacks on other taxes, including the tea tax, the Townshend Acts, and other such measures he deemed as oppressive.

The two editions of the poems of Martha Wadsworth Brewster were printed by Edes and Gill in 1757 and 1758. She was a poet and writer, and one of the earliest American female literary figures as well as the first American-born woman to publish under her own name.

In 1760 Edes and Gill printed and published Eddy's Almanak for 1761, containing astronomical positions of the sun, moon and planets for each month of the year, times of the year eclipses would occur, with literature about the planets and their professed influence on the various parts of the human anatomy. The almanack opened with a satire on Bernard, which appealed to Americans to hold to the non-importation agreement. Edes, relied on the advice and encouragement of Samuel Adams, Warren, Otis, Quincy inasmuch as his contentious spirit often lacked the intellectual capacity to articulate his outspoken and revolutionary ideas in a manner suited for publication.

On February 29, 1768, the Gazette printed an article written by Joseph Warren, but signed "A True Patriot" Though it referred to an unnamed official, it was an obvious and acrimonious attack on Governor Bernard. Bernard, already the subject of numerous insults, immediately sent a message to the Council and to the House of Representatives stating that the Gazette had now endangered "the existence of the Government". The Council unanimously agreed with the Bernard and called the attack "insolent," "licentious," and "subversive of all order and decorum." While they assured the Governor that it would always defend his honor, the House, however, did not go along with such assurances. By a vote of 39 to 30, it informed the Governor that his apprehension of danger was an unfounded conclusion, as no actual person was named in the article. In June, 1769, Bernard demanded that Edes and Gill be arrested for seditious libel, no such action was ever taken. Within three months, upon demand of the Council, he was recalled as Governor.

During the Siege of Boston, Edes escaped to Watertown, Massachusetts, where he continued to publish the Gazette until 1798, 43 years after he started.

== Death and memorials ==
He died on December 11, 1803, in Boston. He is supposedly buried at Copp's Hill Burying Ground. There is a memorial stone with 'Edes' on it, but cemetery records do not attribute it to anyone in particular. There are headstones to other members of this family at Copp's Hill as well.

The Printing Office of Edes & Gill is a living-history museum that attempts to replicate the original print shop of Benjamin Edes and John Gill. The office opened in 2011, and is now located on the Freedom Trail at Faneuil Hall.

== Sources ==
- Alexander, John K. (2002). Samuel Adams: America's Revolutionary Politician. Lanham, Maryland: Rowman & Littlefield. p. 249. ISBN 0-7425-2115-X.
- Eddy, John (1760). Eddy's Almanack, 1761. An astronomical diary: or, an almanack for the year of the Christian aera 1761. Boston : Printed and sold by Edes & Gill in Queen-Street.
- Maier, Pauline (1980). The Old Revolutionaries: Political Lives in the Age of Samuel Adams. New York: Knopf Doubleday Publishing Group. p. 309. ISBN 0-394-51096-8.
- Church in Brattle Square. The Manifesto church: Records of the church in Brattle square, Boston, with lists of communicants, baptisms, marriages and funerals, 1699-1872. Publisher: The Benevolent fraternity of churches, 1902.
- Cutter, W.R. Genealogical and personal memoirs relating to the families of the state of Massachusetts. New York: Lewis Historical Publishing Company, 1910.
- NEHGS. New England historical and genealogical register, Volume 16. Author New England Historic Genealogical Society, 1862.
- Silver, Rollo G. (Third Quarter 1953). "Benjamin Edes, Trumpeter of Sedition". The Papers of the Bibliographical Society of America. 47 (3). The University of Chicago Press / Bibliographical Society of America: 248–268. doi:10.1086/pbsa.47.3.24299601. JSTOR 24299601. S2CID 163699884.
- Schmidt, Gary D. A passionate usefulness: the life and literary labors of Hannah Adams. University of Virginia Press, 2004 ISBN 0-8139-2272-0
- Wilson, James Grant; Fiske, John (1900). Appletons' Cyclopaedia of American Biography. Vol. II. New York, D. Appleton.
