= Liberty Tree Plaza =

Plaza in Boston, Massachusetts, U.S.

Coordinates: 42.35226°N 71.06284°W

- Interactive map of Liberty Tree Plaza
- Type: Plaza
- Dedicated date: Liberty Tree

Liberty Tree Plaza is a plaza commemorating the Liberty Tree in Boston, in the U.S. state of Massachusetts.
