= Pope Night =

Anti-Catholic holiday celebrated in the colonial United States

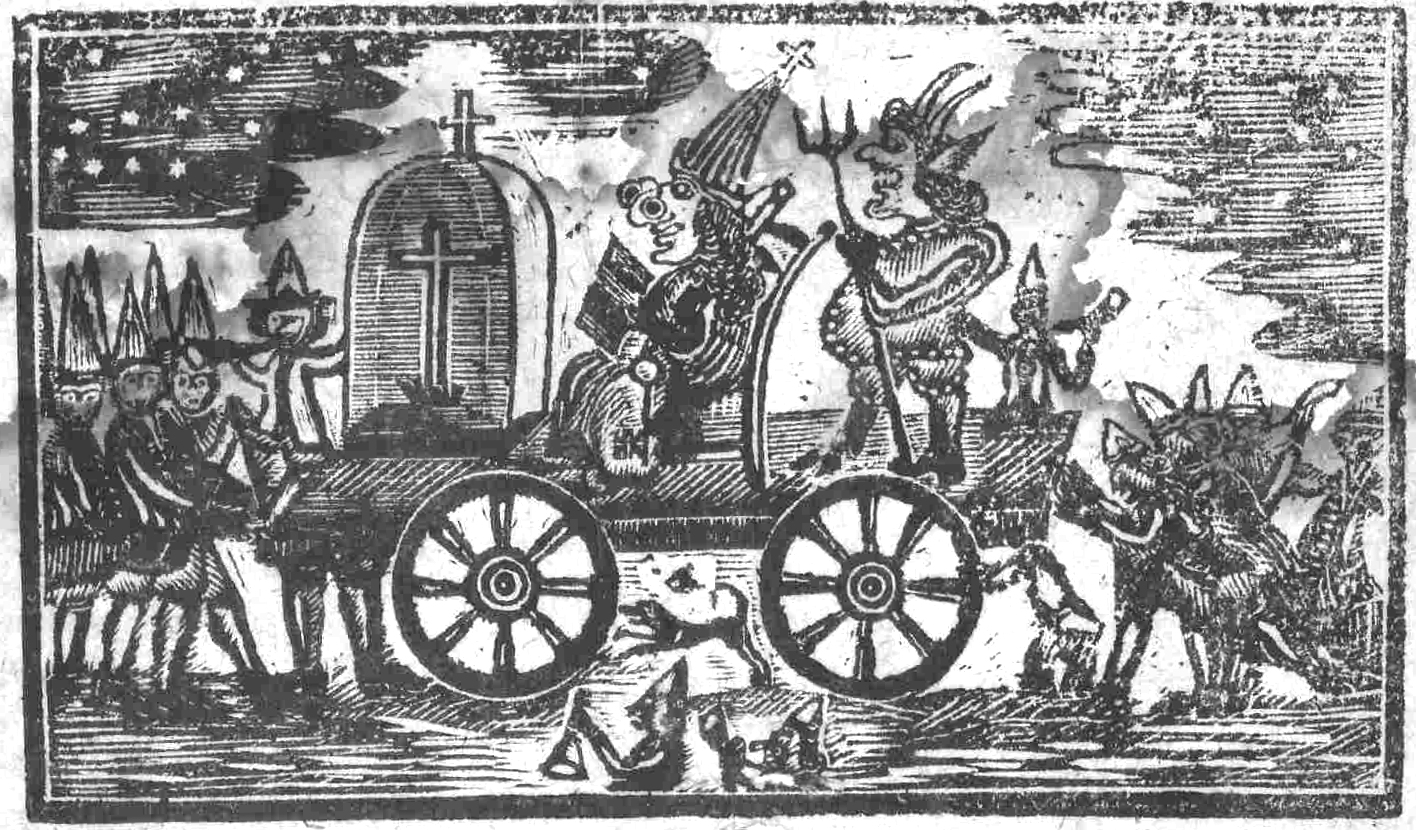
- Artist's depiction of Pope Night in Boston, 1768
- Also called: Pope's Night; Pope Day; Pope's Day
- Observed by: Working-class Protestants in colonial New England
- Celebrations: Processions, extortion of wealthy homeowners, street fighting, and burning of the pope in effigy
- Date: November 5
- Frequency: Annual
- First time: 1623
- Last time: 1892
- Related to: Guy Fawkes Night

Pope Night (also called Pope's Night, Pope Day, or Pope's Day) was an anti-Catholic holiday celebrated annually on November 5 in the colonial United States. It evolved from the English Guy Fawkes Night, which commemorates the failure of the Gunpowder Plot of 1605. Pope Night was most popular in the seaport towns of New England, especially in Boston, where it was an occasion for drinking, rioting, and anti-elite protest by the working class.

Gang violence became part of the tradition in the 1740s, with residents of different Boston neighborhoods battling for the honor of burning the pope's effigy. By the mid-1760s these riots had subsided, and as colonial America moved towards the American Revolution (1765–1783), the class rivalries of Pope Night gave way to anti-British sentiment. Under the leadership of Pope Night organizer Ebenezer Mackintosh, Boston's North and South End gangs united in protest against the Stamp Act of 1765.

Local authorities made several attempts to crack down on the festivities. In 1775, to avoid offending Canadian and French Catholic allies, George Washington issued an order forbidding any troops under his command from participating. The last known Pope Night celebration in Boston took place in 1776, though the tradition continued in other towns well into the 19th century.

== History ==
The earliest known celebration of Pope Night took place on November 5, 1623, in Plymouth, Massachusetts. A group of sailors built a bonfire, which raged out of control and destroyed several nearby homes. By the late 17th century, annual festivities on November 5 were a New England tradition. Major celebrations were held in Boston, Marblehead, Newburyport, Salem, and Portsmouth. In 1702, locals in Marblehead held a bull-baiting and distributed the meat to the poor.

=== Mid-18th century ===
Over the years the celebration became more elaborate. By the 1720s, simple bonfires had been replaced with parades in which effigies of the Pope and the Devil were carried through the streets on a platform before being burned. The celebrants came from what were called the "lower orders" of society: sailors, laborers, apprentices, lesser artisans, servants, and African-American slaves. Active participants were all males; there is no record of any females taking part except as spectators.

Pope Night was celebrated the most consistently and boisterously in Boston, due in part to the large number of sailors there. In the 18th century, sailors occupied the lowest rung of the social ladder; many were criminals, deserted soldiers, and runaway slaves. As a major seaport, Boston had a large contingent of maritime workers for whom a night of drinking, fighting, and insulting the elites had great appeal. Pope Night gave the common people a chance to express their dissatisfaction with the status quo on the pretext of condemning popery. The boisterous and often violent festivities were permitted only because the anti-papal theme made them acceptable to the ruling class.

At least two fatal accidents occurred on Pope Night, possibly due to heavy drinking. In 1735, four apprentices drowned while canoeing home from Boston Neck after the bonfire. In 1764, a carriage bearing an effigy of the pope ran over a boy's head, killing him instantly.

=== Riot acts ===
Boston's elites were appalled by the increasingly rowdy festivities. One resident, complaining to a local newspaper in 1745, referred to the revelers as "rude and intoxicated Rabble, the very Dregs of the People, black and white", and urged the authorities to crack down.

In 1748, the Justices of the Peace announced that "whereas sundry persons have heretofore gone about the streets ... armed wh. clubs & demanding money of ye inhabitants and breaking ye windows of ye who refuse it", they planned to send out constables to keep the peace. Similar notices were published over the next four years, to no avail. In 1753 the Great and General Court passed an act forbidding "all riotous, tumultuous and disorderly Assemblies" from "carrying pageants and other shews through the streets and lanes of the town of Boston and other towns of this province, abusing and insulting the inhabitants". The court passed similar acts in 1756, 1758, 1763, and 1769, but the locals were determined to have their fun.

The 1769 Riot Act imposed penalties for shaking down wealthy residents:

Be it enacted, That if any Persons being more than three in Number, and being armed all or either of them with Sticks, Clubs, or any kind of Weapons, or disguised with Vizards (so-called) or painted or discolored Faces, or being in any other Manner disguised shall assemble together having Imagery or Pageantry for a public Shew, Shall by Menaces of otherwise exact, require, demand, or ask, any Money or other Thing of Value from any of the Inhabitants or other Person in the Streets, Lanes, of any Town within this Province ... shall for each Offense forfeit and pay the Sum of Forty Shillings, or suffer imprisonment not exceeding one month; or if the Offender shall be a Negro Servant, he may be whipped not exceeding Ten Stripes.

Authorities apparently could not rely on the militia to keep order on Pope Night. A possible explanation is that the militiamen themselves were among the revelers. Local militiamen participated in the market riot of 1737 and the Knowles Riot of 1747, and instigated the Montgomery Guards Riot of 1837. Following an accident on Pope Night in 1764 in which a boy was killed, the "Sheriff, Justices, and Officers of the Militia" were ordered to destroy the North and South End popes, but were unable to control the crowd, which numbered in the thousands. No mention is made of the militia's rank and file.

=== Decline ===
The passing of the Stamp Act in March 1765 caused a good deal of unrest in the American colonies. The Sons of Liberty were a leading group of American dissidents at this time. The Loyal Nine, a group of nine area businessmen, led the Sons of Liberty and were a link between the common people and wealthier classes. That summer the Loyal Nine arranged the unification of the North and South End mobs. On Pope Night 1765, townspeople held a "Union Feast", with a single procession led jointly by the South End mob leader, Ebenezer Mackintosh, and the North End leader, Samuel Swift. The two mobs stopped battling each other, and Mackintosh became the leader of the united group. John Hancock and other patriot merchants provided them with food, drink, and supplies. In author Alfred Young's view, Pope Night provided the "scaffolding, symbolism, and leadership" for resistance to the Stamp Act in 1764–65.

The passage in 1774 of the Quebec Act, which guaranteed French Canadians free practice of Catholicism in the Province of Quebec, provoked complaints from some Americans that the British were introducing "Popish principles and French law". Such fears were bolstered by opposition from the Church in Europe to American independence, threatening a revival of Pope Night. Commenting in 1775, George Washington was less than impressed by the thought of any such resurrections, forbidding any under his command from participating:

As the Commander in Chief has been apprized of a design form'd for the observance of that ridiculous and childish custom of burning the Effigy of the pope—He cannot help expressing his surprise that there should be Officers and Soldiers in this army so void of common sense, as not to see the impropriety of such a step at this Juncture; at a Time when we are solliciting, and have really obtain'd, the friendship and alliance of the people of Canada, whom we ought to consider as Brethren embarked in the same Cause. The defence of the general Liberty of America: At such a juncture, and in such Circumstances, to be insulting their Religion, is so monstrous, as not to be suffered or excused; indeed instead of offering the most remote insult, it is our duty to address public thanks to these our Brethren, as to them we are so much indebted for every late happy Success over the common Enemy in Canada.

Generally, following Washington's complaint, American colonists stopped observing Pope Night, although according to the Bostonian Society some citizens of Boston celebrated it on one final occasion, in 1776. Sherwood Collins argues that the tradition ended in Boston at this time not only because of Washington's order, but because most of the celebrants were likely patriots who did not stay in Boston while it was held by the British; and, moreover, because it celebrated the failure of a plot against the British king and Parliament, who were now the enemy.

The tradition continued in Salem as late as 1817, and was still observed in Portsmouth, New Hampshire, in 1892. In the 1880s bonfires were still being lit in some New England coastal towns, although no longer to commemorate the failure of the Gunpowder Plot. In the area around New York, stacks of barrels were burnt on election day eve, which after 1845 was a Tuesday early in November.

== Festivities ==
At the height of its popularity, Pope Night in Boston was a three-part ritual consisting of a procession in which effigies of the Pope and other figures were paraded through the streets; a battle between the processions from the North and South Ends; and the burning of the effigies by the victors. Locals would spend weeks preparing their effigies for the celebration. The processions were organized by elected officers who, unlike traditional political leaders, came from the lower classes. One such leader was Ebenezer Mackintosh of the South End, a shoemaker who was also the town's official sealer of leather.

=== Procession ===
The procession was led by young boys who carried small effigies of the pope. According to a 1768 broadsheet sold by the "Printers Boys in Boston":

The little Popes, they go out First,
With little teney Boys:
In Frolicks they are full of Gale
And laughing make a Noise.

The boys carved the heads of their "popes" from potatoes, and mounted the effigies on shingles or boards, some small enough for a single boy to carry in his hands, others requiring two or three boys to carry through the streets. During the day they went door to door with their popes, demanding tributes from the neighbors in a tradition very similar to trick-or-treating.

Next came the large effigies, which were mounted on wheeled platforms, like parade floats. The publisher Isaiah Thomas, who took part in the Pope Night celebrations as a child in the 1750s and 60s, described the floats in his memoir:

On the front of these stages, was placed ... a large lantern framed circular at the top and covered with paper. Behind his lantern was placed an effigy of the pope sitting in an armed Chair. Immediately behind him was the imaginary representation of the Devil, standing Erect with extended arms. ...The large Effigies had heads placed on poles which went thro' the bodies & thro' the upper part of the stages which were formed like large boxes, some of them not less than 16 or 18 feet long, 3 or 4 feet wide and 3 or 4 feet in depth. Inside of the Stages and out of sight sat a boy under each effigy whose business it was to move the heads of the Effigies by means of the poles ... from one side to the other as fancy directed.

The effigies' heads could also be raised, appearing to peek into second-story windows of nearby houses. The crowd shouted insults at the figures as they passed:

The great Ones next go out, and meet
With many a Smart Rebuf:
They're hall'd along from Street to Street
And call'd hard Names enough.

The floats were typically about ten to twelve feet long, although there are accounts of much larger ones. One float in Newburyport was forty feet long, and so heavy it had to be drawn by several horses; it carried additional effigies of monks and friars as well as several dancers and fiddlers. In Boston, the floats were pulled through the narrow, winding streets by men and boys. During the 1760s, when Ebenezer Mackintosh was in charge of the South End procession, he would march ahead of the float, dressed in a blue and gold uniform with a lace hat, carrying a speaking trumpet. Besides being festive, the gaudy uniform was intended as a mockery of Boston's elites.

The "pope" was dressed in ornate, antiquated garb, and had an exaggerated Roman nose. Behind him, the Devil was coated with tar and feathers, and stood holding a key in one hand and a pitchfork in the other. After 1701, the display also included an effigy of the exiled Catholic prince James Francis Edward Stuart, nicknamed the "Old Pretender", sometimes on a gibbet. Boys dressed up as devils and danced around the figures. The display reflected the prevailing belief among New England Protestants that Catholics were in league with the devil. The effigy pope's aristocratic appearance was also symbolic. Dressed in "gorgeous attire" with a large white wig and an enormous gold lace hat, the pope became a symbol of wealth as well as popery.

During the procession, masked and costumed revelers would stop at the homes of wealthy residents and threaten to break their windows unless they contributed funds for the festivities. Sometimes they broke the windows just for fun, even after the owner had made a generous donation. In Boston there were usually two processions, one from the North End and the other from the South End. According to John Rowe (the Boston merchant for whom Rowes Wharf is named), there were three processions in 1766.

Historian Francis Cogliano calls it a "wonderful irony" that the anti-papal processions in the colonies were so similar to the Carnival celebrations in Catholic Europe. Both celebrations gave the lower classes a chance to act out in a disorderly and aggressive fashion, intimidating the elites. Historian Jack Tager likens the street pageantry to European mummery or charivari.

=== Battle between the North and South Ends ===
By the mid-18th century, violence had become an established part of the Pope Night tradition in Boston. When the North and South End processions met, they fought a street battle with each group trying to capture the other's pope. The fighters attacked each other with clubs and brickbats, often resulting in serious injuries and even death. The publisher Isaiah Thomas recalled in his memoir that "altho' persons were seldom killed, yet broken heads were not infrequent". As a boy, Thomas himself was nearly killed one Pope Night when he was hit in the head with a brickbat. Another resident complained to the Boston Evening Post in 1745:

The rudest and lowest Sailors out of Boston ... fall upon one another with Clubs and Cutlasses, in a Rage and Fury which only Hell could inspire. ...What Madness must seize the two Mobs, united Brethren, even as they would appear against Popery, to fall upon each other, break each other's Bones, or dash one another's Brains out!

In 1752, a sailor named John Crabb was clubbed to death on Pope Night by Thomas Chubb also a sailor, and a slave named Abraham. Chubb was branded on the hand and sentenced to a year in prison for his part in the killing; it is not known what happened to Abraham.

=== Bonfire ===
The location of the bonfire varied from year to year. If the North End won the battle, the effigies were burned in a bonfire on Copp's Hill; if the South End won, the effigies were burned on Boston Common.

In addition to the Devil, the Pope, the Pretender, and Guy Fawkes, effigies of prominent contemporary figures were often burned on Pope Night. The actress Nancy Dawson was sometimes included as an effigy, other times as a man in costume. Others burnt in effigy included Admiral John Byng, John Mein (a Tory printer, hated by the patriots), Governor Thomas Hutchinson, various customs officials, two Prime Ministers of Great Britain (the Earl of Bute and Lord North), and the American traitor General Benedict Arnold. Revelers threw the bodies of the effigies into the fire, saving the heads for reuse the following year.
