= Ebenezer Mackintosh =

Shoemaker and riots leader (born June 1737)

Ebenezer Mackintosh (June 20, 1737 – 1816) was a shoemaker who lived in New England in the 18th and 19th centuries. He is known for his role as a leader in Boston riots protesting the Stamp Act.

== Early life ==
Ebenezer Mackintosh was born on June 20, 1737, in Boston to impoverished parents Mary Everet and Moses Macintosh, an intermittent soldier in the 1730s and 1740s. Ebenezer lived with them until 1751 when Mary died and Moses departed Boston, leaving the 14-year-old as apprentice to his shoemaker uncle, Ichibod Jones. This gave Mackintosh few career possibilities as well as limited opportunities for social mobility; shoemakers in Boston were usually lower class. Mackintosh enlisted in the militia in 1754 and was part of the British-colonial mission to Fort Ticonderoga in 1758. In 1760, Mackintosh joined Fire Engine Company No. 9 in Boston's South End. Meanwhile, he married Elizabeth Maverick in August 1766, with whom he had two children, one of whom was named Paschal Paoli for the Corsican rebel who was at the time leading his ethnically Italian island in revolt against French rule.

== Rise to popularity and recognition ==
In the 1760s, Mackintosh gained notoriety as a popular leader among the poor in Boston's South End. He became head of the South End gang in the Pope's Day or Guy Fawkes Day yearly festivities, from which we can reasonably guess that he was a Puritan. Each year on November 5, Guy Fawkes Day or Pope's Day, the South End mob fought with their rival the North End mob over each other's effigies of the Pope, which were burned by the winners. In 1764, however, the fight turned especially violent; many were injured and a young boy was killed. Because of this turn of events, sheriffs and militia were called to destroy the North and South end effigy popes and stop the events. The authorities took apart the North End mob's pope, but under Mackintosh's lead the South End crowd protected theirs. The North End then rebuilt their effigy and the wild celebration continued. In response to the actions that took place that day, Mackintosh and others were arrested, but nothing came of it.

== The Stamp Act protests ==
Mackintosh played a key role in other riots and events in the following year related to the protests and eventual repeal of the Stamp Act in March 1766. The passing of the Stamp Act in March 1765 caused a good deal of unrest in the American colonies. The Sons of Liberty were a leading group of American dissidents at this time. The Loyal Nine, a group of nine businessmen, led the Sons of Liberty and were a link between the common people and wealthier classes. In August 1765 the Loyal Nine arranged the unification of the North and South End crowds. The group also found a mob captain among the common people to do their bidding: Ebenezer Mackintosh. The crowds were brought together by feelings of discontent and anger about economic depression and unemployment as well as the Stamp Act; only basic leadership was necessary. Mackintosh was a good choice as he was lower class and had a small government position – he had been chosen that year for the unpaid town position of sealer of leather.

On August 14, Mackintosh led a destructive wild riot of more than 3,000 in protest of the Stamp Act. The crowd invaded the house of soon-to-be stamp distributor Andrew Oliver. The crowd also destroyed, in less than 30 minutes, an office that he had built, and then used the timbers for a bonfire. Furthermore, rioters hung both an effigy of Andrew Oliver and a boot that represented the British men of power, the Earl of Bute and George Grenville. The next day Andrew Oliver resigned through letter from the position of stamp distributor. Samuel Adams was pleased with the crowd's actions and described it as "deliberately [and] … rationally destroying property, after trying every method to preserve it…when the men in power had rendered the destruction of that property the only means of securing the property of all."

Not long after, on August 26, Ebenezer Mackintosh led a riot that destroyed three houses, including that of lieutenant governor Thomas Hutchinson. Afterwards, Mackintosh had to run for his life, breaking up his possessions, including his many manuscripts, and stealing his money. He was, however, caught and arrested, but leading Whigs stopped the Suffolk County policeman Stephen Greenleaf from keeping him by swearing peace would be maintained in Boston only if Mackintosh was set free. Andrew Eliot, a witness of the events, wrote in a letter to a colleague, Thomas Hollis, in England: "The good people of Boston are very careful to distinguish between the 14th and the 26th of August. The attack on Secretary Oliver…it is supposed was under direction of some persons of character. It is certain, people in general were not displeased. The 26th of August was under a very different direction. It was a scene of riot, drunkenness, profaneness and robbery." Today there is debate about whether Mackintosh and his companions went beyond the tame protests wanted by the wealthier class. There is also speculation about the motives behind the August 26 riot and whether it was not the idea of someone other than the Loyal Nine, such as perhaps Mackintosh. Samuel Adams was, unlike with August 14, displeased by what happened on August 26, describing it as "a lawless attack upon property in a case where if there had been right there was remedy."

Later the same year, on Pope's Day, the North and South End mobs came together under "General" Mackintosh to parade. The Loyal Nine rewarded Mackintosh with a gilt uniform and a speaking trumpet for the occasion. About a month later, in December, Mackintosh led another crowd, this time that led Andrew Oliver, whom town soldiers would not defend, to an elm that would come to be known as the Liberty Tree and made him again resign his position as stamp distributor.

== Character and life after the Stamp Act protests: 1766–death ==
Ebenezer Mackintosh was known as a capable leader. He could supposedly lead a crowd with a whisper or gesture and could get 2,000 men to walk in two neat lines. Andrew Oliver's brother and fellow loyalist, Peter, described Mackintosh as "sensible and manly" and that for someone generally doing the dirty work for more prominent people did it "with great éclat." Upon observing the 1765 Pope's Day event, he described Mackintosh as "endowed with superior Honor." Even Thomas Hutchinson described Mackintosh in a letter to Thomas Pownall in 1766 as "a bold fellow and as likely for Massiangello [a Sicilian revolutionary] as you can well conceive." Yet many men who tried to lead the protest movement in 1764 and 1765 might not have liked Mackintosh because of his low social status. "We do everything in order to keep this and the first Affair Private," merchant and Loyal Nine member Henry Bass wrote to his friend Samuel P. Savage in December 1765 after Andrew Oliver's second resignation, "and are not a little pleas'd to hear that Mackintosh has the Credit of the whole Affair." Additionally, Mackintosh criticized economic superiority and mocked those with more wealth than him, those who he often took directions from, and criticized with his elaborate garb on Pope's Day 1765. Furthermore, the Sons of Liberty would have had to trust Mackintosh while he was taking directions from them with a lot of valuable information.

Despite Mackintosh's possibly strained relationship with those he listened to, he was again chosen as sealer of leather in 1766, 1767, and 1768, but not in 1769. There is also no record of him being involved in mobs in the late 1760s and 1770s protesting regulations by Britain. The following year Mackintosh spent some time in debtors' prison. By September 1774, Mackintosh had left Boston and settled in the town of Haverhill, New Hampshire. In 1777 he joined the army for two months to fight the attack on New York City led by British General John Burgoyne. Having returned to Haverhill, he served as the town's sealer of leather in 1782, 1783, and 1784. In 1784 his wife Elizabeth died. Mackintosh later married Elizabeth Chase, a widow and mother of three, and went on to have three children of his own with her. Many of his children from his two marriages moved to Ohio. When he was 65, he walked all the way to Ohio and back to see his children there.

He was poor towards the end of his life, having to sell his work to the overseer of the Haverhill poor farm in 1810 and 1811 to get by. When he died in 1816, he was buried in the local Haverhill cemetery under the name of Philip McIntosh by mistake, with the claim that he led the Boston Tea Party in 1773. Mackintosh claimed involvement in the Boston Tea Party, and although there is no direct evidence of this, researchers have opined "that he had a hand in the affair seems reasonably certain."

== Memorials ==
A New Hampshire historical marker (number 104) in Haverhill, New Hampshire, reads:

Born in Boston and a veteran of the 1758 Battle of Ticonderoga. As a known participant in the Boston Tea Party, for his own and his children’s safety, he walked to North Haverhill in early 1774. He later served in the Northern Army under Gen. Gates in 1777. He was a shoemaker by trade and practiced his vocation here for the rest of his life. He is buried nearby in Horse Meadow Cemetery.
