= Peabody Institute (disambiguation) =

Peabody Institute of the Johns Hopkins University (est.1857) is a private conservatory and preparatory school in Baltimore, Maryland.

The Peabody Institute may also refer to:

- Peabody Institute Library (est.1852), 82 Main Street, Peabody, Massachusetts
- Peabody Institute Library of Danvers (est.1856), 15 Sylvan Street, Danvers, MA
