= Boston Gazette =

18th-century newspaper in Massachusetts

The Boston Gazette
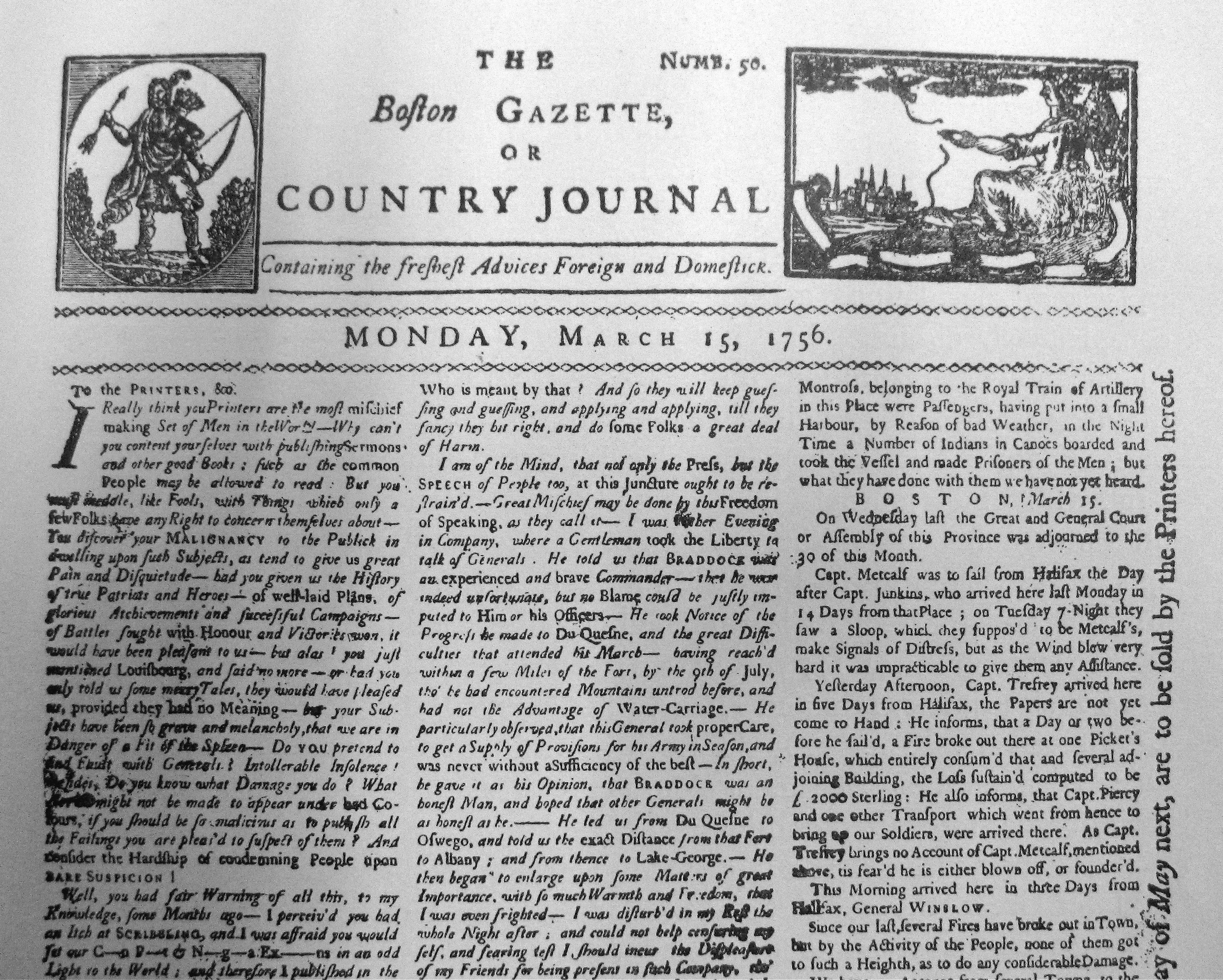
- Type: Daily newspaper
- Format: Broadsheet
- Owner: Boston Gazette LLC
- Founded: 1719; 307 years ago
- Ceased publication: 1798; 228 years ago
- Language: English
- Headquarters: Boston, Massachusetts, United States

The Boston Gazette (Note: It should not be confused with the Boston-Gazette, (spelled with a hyphen), published 1803–1816.) (1719–1798) was a newspaper published in Boston, in the British North American colonies. It was a weekly newspaper established by William Brooker, who was just appointed Postmaster of Boston, with its first issue released on December 21, 1719. The Boston Gazette is widely considered the most influential newspaper in early American history, especially in the years leading up to and into the American Revolution. In 1741 the Boston Gazette incorporated the New-England Weekly Journal, founded by Samuel Kneeland, and became the Boston-Gazette, or New-England Weekly Journal. Contributors included: Samuel Adams, Paul Revere, Phyllis Wheatley.

== Publishing ==
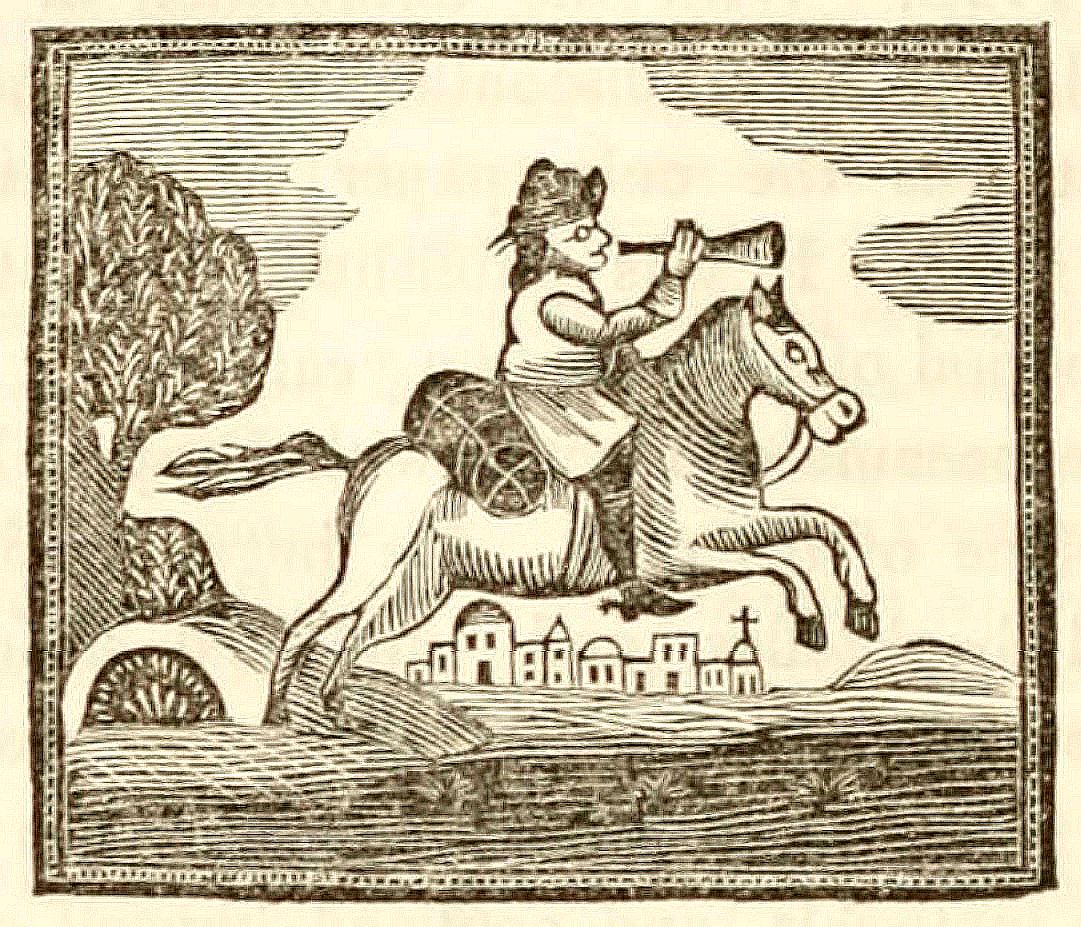
Woodcut used in the heading on the first issues of the Boston Gazette

Publishers, and men acting on their behalf, included: (dates are approximate)

- William Brooker (1719)
- Benjamin Edes, Benjamin Franklin, James Franklin (1719)
- Philip Musgrave (1720)
- Thomas Lewis (1725–26)
- Henry Marshall (1726–27)
- Bartholomew Green Jr. (1727–32)
- John Boydell (died December 11, 1739) (1732–36)
- Timothy Green (1736–41)
- Samuel Kneeland (1720–53)
- John Gill (1755–75) DAR Patriot # A044675
- Benjamin Edes (1755–94)
- Benjamin Edes, Jr. (1779–94)
- Peter Edes (1779 – c. 1784)

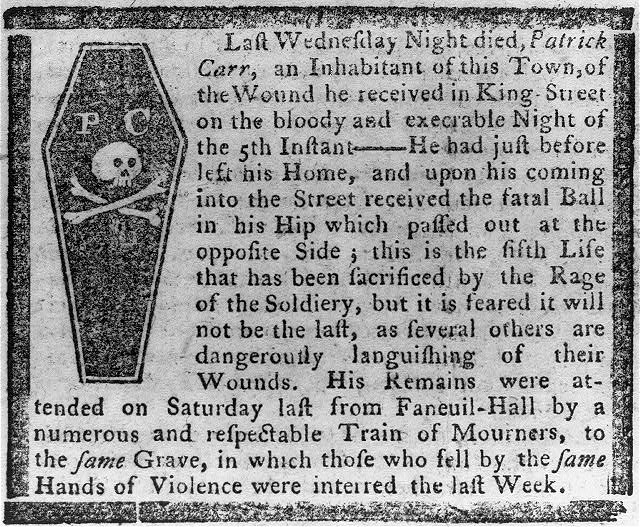
Obituary of Patrick Carr, Boston Massacre victim. Boston Gazette, 19 March 1770. Engraving by Paul Revere.

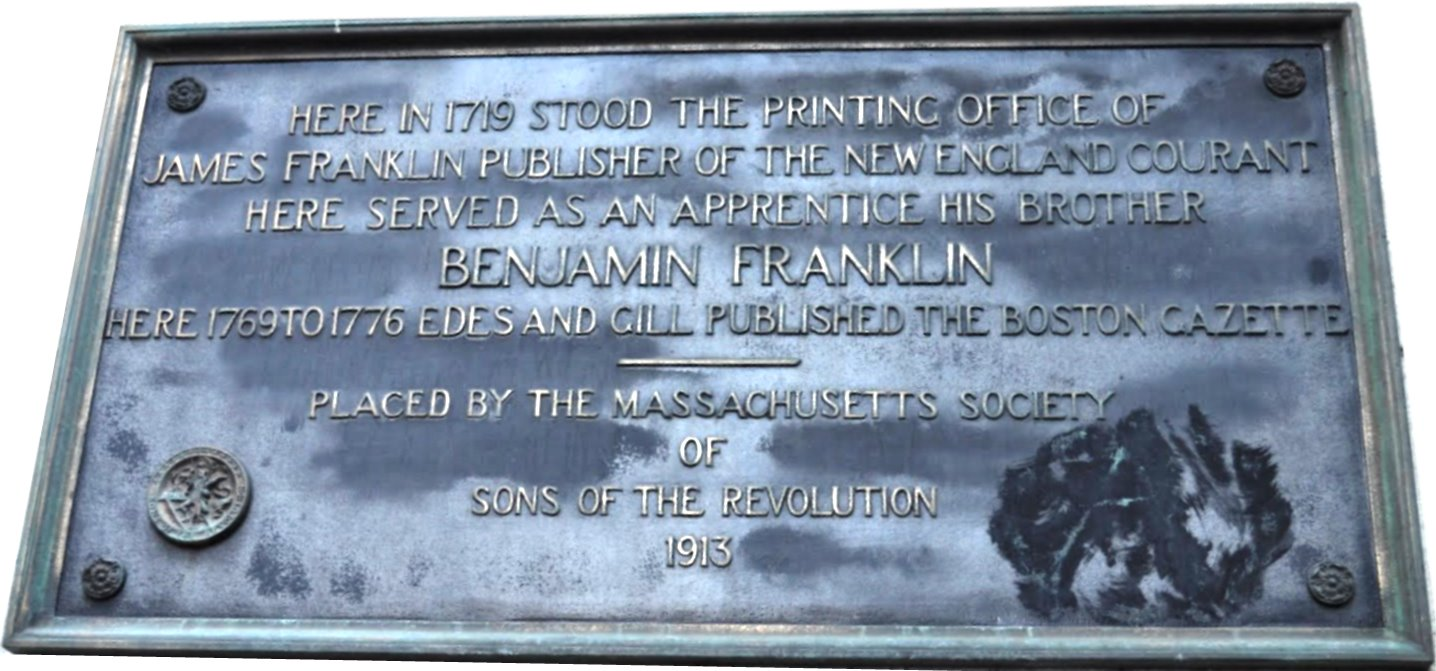
Boston Gazette plaque at 17 Court St. in Boston, MA

The paper's masthead vignette, produced by Paul Revere shows a seated Britannia with Liberty cap on staff, freeing a bird from a cage. Motto: "Containing the freshest Advices, Foreign and Domestic" This issue is often reprinted.

"After the Revolution [the paper] lost its great contributors and its tone and policy were changed. It bitterly opposed the adoption of the constitution of the United States and the administration of Washington. The paper declined in power, interest and popular favor, till, after a long struggle, in 1798, it was discontinued for want of support." It was noted for its many spirited and often controversial political essays. Like most newspapers of its era it often published ads for the sale of slaves and notices of runaway slaves and runaway indentured servants.

== Hutchinson letters leak ==
Benjamin Franklin acquired a packet of about twenty letters that had been written to Thomas Whately, an assistant to Prime Minister George Grenville. Upon reading them, Franklin concluded that Massachusetts Lieutenant Governor Thomas Hutchinson and his colonial secretary (plus brother-in-law) Andrew Oliver, had mischaracterized the situation in the colonies, and thus misled Parliament. He felt that wider knowledge of these letters would then focus colonial anger away from Parliament and at those who had written the misleading letters. Franklin sent the letters to Thomas Cushing, the speaker of the Massachusetts assembly, in December 1772. He specifically wrote to Cushing that the letters should be seen only by a few people, and that he was not "at liberty to make the letters public."

The letters arrived in Massachusetts in March 1773, and came into the hands of Samuel Adams, then serving as the clerk of the Massachusetts assembly. By Franklin's instructions, only a select few people, including the Massachusetts Committee of Correspondence, were to see the letters. Alarmed at what they read, Cushing wrote Franklin, asking if the restrictions on their circulation could be eased. In a response received by Cushing in early June, Franklin reiterated that they were not to be copied or published, but could be shown to anyone

A longtime opponent of Hutchinson's, Samuel Adams informed the assembly of the existence of the letters, after which it designated a committee to analyze them. Strategic leaks suggestive of their content made their way into the press and political discussions, causing Hutchinson much discomfort. The assembly eventually concluded, according to John Hancock, that in the letters Hutchinson sought to "overthrow the Constitution of this Government, and to introduce arbitrary Power into the Province", and called for the removal of Hutchinson and Oliver. Hutchinson complained that Adams and the opposition were misrepresenting what he had written, and that nothing he had written in them on the subject of Parliamentary supremacy went beyond other statements he had made. The letters were finally published in the Boston Gazette in mid-June 1773, causing a political firestorm in Massachusetts and raising significant questions in England.

== American Revolution ==
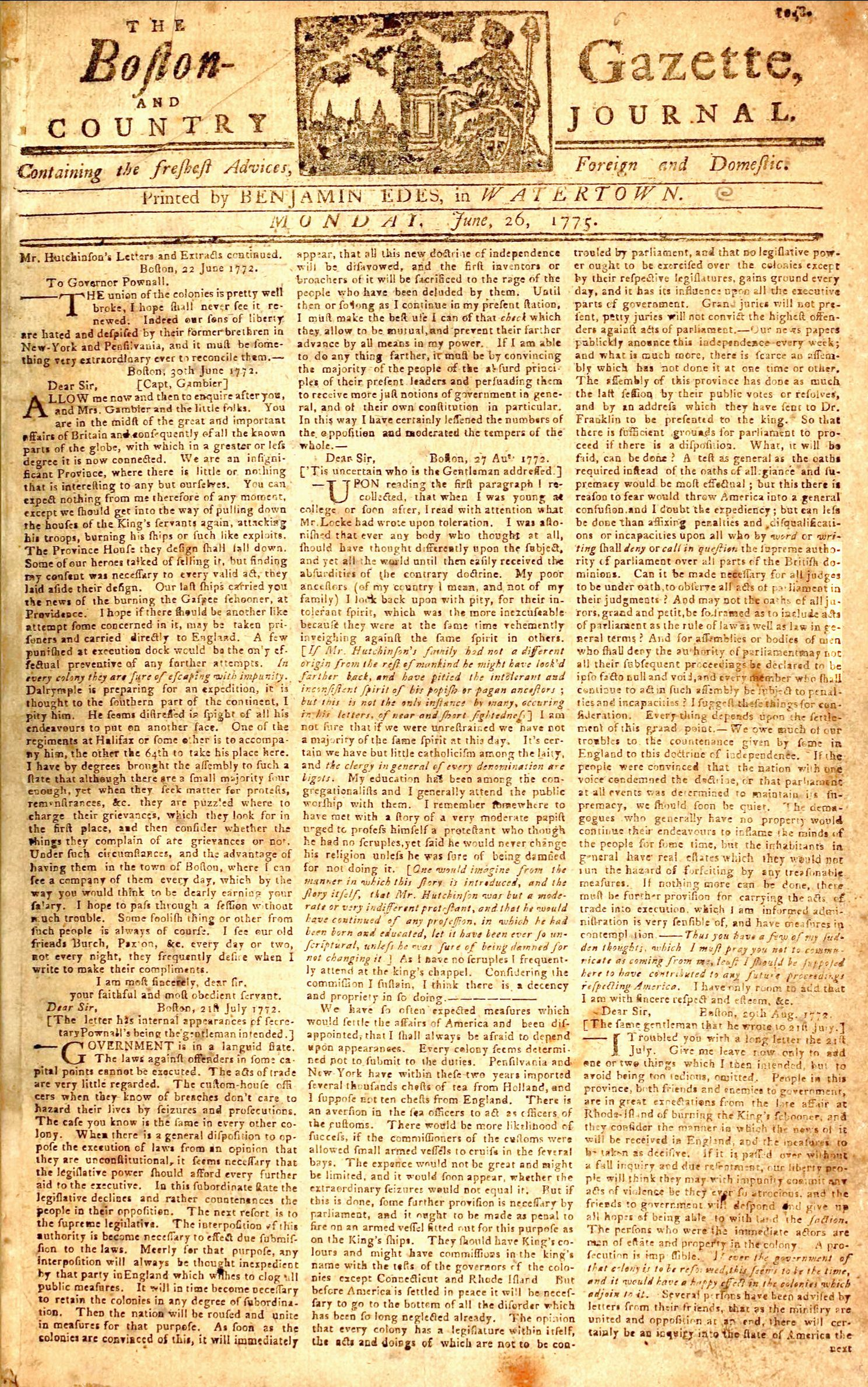
Boston Gazette, June 26, 1776, Revolutionary War issue

For years before the Battles of Lexington and Concord, Green, Samuel Adams, Joseph Warren, Josiah Quincy, James Otis, Edes and Gill were writing article after article in the Boston Gazette against royal authority. Adams wrote so many articles, under so many pen names (at least 25), that historians are unsure exactly how many he wrote. It was the Boston Gazette that hired Paul Revere to create his famous engraving of the Boston Massacre.

During the first decade of the American Revolution, Crown officials resented the Boston Gazette, as they feared it undermined their authority. Francis Bernard and Thomas Hutchinson, who both served as the governor of Massachusetts in the years leading up to the outbreak of the American Revolution, filed an affidavit describing Edes and Gill as "trumpeters of sedition".

The Sons of Liberty met at the Boston Gazette. It was there that they darkened their faces, disguising themselves as Mohawk Indians before setting out to dump East India Company tea into Boston Harbor during the Boston Tea Party. Samuel Adams spend a large amount of time at the Boston Gazette.

On 18–19 July 1776, Edes received the text for the Declaration of Independence, and put it to print on 22 July. On the front page, the news reported on the Continental Congress, Continental Army activity, the dismantling of the equestrian statue of George III in New York, and the 18 July reading of the Declaration of Independence at the Boston State House on 1 PM, to which the audience responded with "three huzzas", "thirteen pieces of cannon were fired", a toast was offered and bells were rung.

== Varying titles ==
- Boston Gazette (Dec. 21, 1719-Oct. 19, 1741).
- Boston Gazette or New England weekly journal (Oct. 20, 1741).
- Boston Gazette or Weekly journal (Oct. 27, 1741-Dec. 26, 1752).
- Boston Gazette or Weekly advertiser (Jan. 3, 1753-Apr. 1, 1755).
- Boston Gazette or Country journal (Apr. 7, 1755-Apr. 5, 1756).
- Boston Gazette or The Country journal (Apr. 12, 1756-Dec. 30, 1793).
- Boston gazette, and Weekly republican journal (Jan. 6, 1794-Sept. 17, 1798).

In recent years, the Boston Gazette print shop of Edes & Gill has been recreated and is open to the public as a museum in Boston.

== Bibliography ==
- Apfelbaum, Charles; Apfelbaum, Lois (1980). Early American Newspapers and their Printers: 1715–1783. Valley Stream: Appletree Press.
- Burns, Eric (2006). Infamous Scribblers: The Founding Fathers and the Rowdy Beginnings of American Journalism. Public Affairs, New York, New York. ISBN 978-1-58648-334-0.
- Alexander, John (2011). Samuel Adams: The Life of an American Revolutionary. Lanham, MD: Rowman and Littlefield. ISBN 978-0-7425-7033-7. OCLC 678924183.
- Patricia Bradley. The Boston Gazette and slavery as revolutionary propaganda. Journalism & Mass Communication Quarterly. 22 Sep 1995. Vol. 72, Iss. 3; p. 581(16).
- Brigham. History and Bibliography of American Newspapers. 1968.
- Buckingham, Joseph Tinker (1850). Specimens of newspaper literature : with personal memoirs, anecdotes, and reminiscences. Boston : Charles C. Little and James Brown.
- Copeland, David A. (2000). Debating the issues in colonial newspapers : primary documents on events of the period. Westport, Conn. : Greenwood Press. ISBN 9780313309823.
- Mary Farwell Ayer, Albert Matthews. Check-list of Boston newspapers, 1704–1780. Colonial Society of Massachusetts, 1907.
- TOLD IN ADS; Newspaper Notices a Source of History. Paul Revere Advertised Sale of Best Psalm Tune. First Umbrella Picture in Boston Gazette. Boston Daily Globe, Mar 29, 1914. p.SM15.
- Holmberg, Georgia McKee. "British-American Whig Political Rhetoric, 1765–1776: A Content Analysis of the London Gazette, London Chronicle, and Boston Gazette" (dissertation). University of Pittsburgh, 1979.
- Walt Nott. From "uncultivated Barbarian" to "poetical genius": the public presence of Phillis Wheatley. MELUS. Fall 1993. Vol. 18, Iss. 3; p. 21(12).
- Sandra Moore. The Boston Gazette and Country Journal: Voice of resistance and mouthpiece of the Revolution (dissertation). University of Houston, 2005
- Thomas, Isaiah (1874). The history of printing in America, with a biography of printers. Vol. I. New York, B. Franklin.
- "Boston Gazette April 10, 1775". Walking Tours of Historic Boston. 2004–2006. Archived from the original on April 5, 2006.
