= John Gill (printer) =

American printer and publisher (1732–1785)

John Gill (1732–1785) was a printer in Boston, Massachusetts, in the 18th century. With Benjamin Edes, he issued the Boston Gazette newspaper. He later published the Continental Journal between 1776 and 1785.

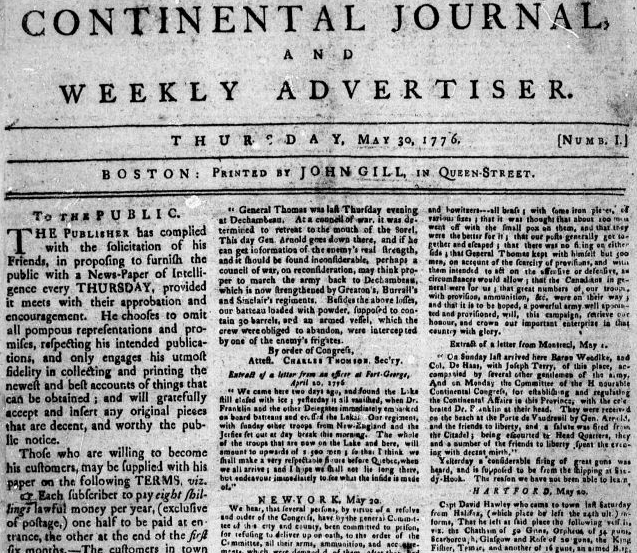
Continental Journal no.1, May 30, 1776; "printed by John Gill in Queen-Street," Boston

== Early life and career ==
Gill was born in 1732 in Charlestown, Province of Massachusetts. He trained as a printer with Samuel Kneeland. He also married one of Kneeland's daughters.

Gill was the brother of Hon. Moses Gill, who for several years after the revolution was Lieutenant-Governor of the Commonwealth of Massachusetts.

Edes & Gill printed the Boston Gazette from 1755 until 1775. During the British occupation of Boston, 1775–1776, "Gill remained in Boston during the siege; he did no business." "After the evacuation of Boston, his connection with Edes ended. They divided their stock, and settled their concerns. While Edes continued the publication of the Gazette, Gill issued another paper, titled The Continental Journal. Having published this paper several years, he sold the right of it, in 1785, with his printing materials, to James D. Griffith."

== Death ==
Gill died August 25, 1785, leaving several children. His death was announced in his Continental Journal, and contained the following tribute:

"Capt. John Gill, for disseminating principles destructive of tyranny, suffered during the siege of this town in 1775, what many other printers were threatened with, a cruel imprisonment. He, however, was so fortunate as to survive the conflict; but had the mortification, lately, of seeing the press ready to be shackled by a stamp act fabricated in his native state; he, therefore, resigned his business, not choosing to submit to a measure which Britain artfully adopted as the foundation of her intended tyranny in America. His remains were very respectfully entombed last Monday afternoon."
