= Credit in the Thirteen Colonies =

The Thirteen Colonies made wide use of credit. Credit was used for domestic and overseas goods, as well as a method of repayment. Credit allowed colonists to defer their payments for goods and services until a later time, which was a more favourable payment option than cash or barter. Institutions accepted credit despite its risks, including that of the inability of a debtor to repay.

== Credit ==
=== Advantages ===
Credit from British merchants facilitated trade and provided working capital for colonial merchants and farmers. The advantages of purchasing goods on credit was avoiding currency exchanges and facilitating faster trades.

=== Overseas and domestic ===
Colonists relied on international funds, primarily from England, for their early development. Majority of this overseas credit was in the form of a mercantile credit. The English merchants, for example, would ship goods to the American Colonies and demand payments only after six months or a year. These overseas loans where available to colonists who developed close ties to English merchants. The overseas credit allowed colonists to develop a system of domestic credit. The domestic credit was administered in two forms: book credit and promissory notes. Promissory notes are very similar to bonds, because they detailed the amount of debt, date of issue, date of redemption, form of repayment and an interest rate. Because of these characteristics, promissory notes could be traded and they were considered a less risky form of a loan to issuers.

=== Repayments and loan durations ===
Loan repayment was often in cash, bills of exchange and goods. Some debtors repaid their loans by providing the creditor with labour. Alternatively, children or oxen where 'lent' to the creditor.

Typical domestic loans were issued for a time period of several months to a few years. The overseas loans were usually issued for 6 months to a year. This means that some domestic loans were issued more than the overseas loans, and these were typically promissory note loans. The longer-term horizon explains the need for detailing the conditions of the issuance and the specifics of the promissory note loans, as the risks of default are higher for a long term maturity debt.

=== Interest rates ===
Because of the issuance of long term credit, the merchants introduced interest rates to protect themselves from the possibility of losing their investments. The average interest rates the merchants charged on an annual level were between 3.5% and 7%. However, some merchants charged interest rates as high as 10% on certain loans.

== Disadvantages of cash ==
The colonies had many currencies and coins in circulation. However, there was a shortage of currency for those wishing to use it as a medium of exchange. There were additional costs to facilitating some trades which was avoided by the use of credit.

== See also ==
- Banking in the United States
- Colonial history of the United States
- Economic history of the United States: Colonial economy to 1780s
