= 3-6-3 Rule =

Principle of United States retail banking industry from the 1950s to 1970s

The term 3-6-3 Rule describes how the United States retail banking industry operated from the 1950s to the 1980s. The name 3-6-3 refers to the impression that bankers had a stable, comfortable existence by paying 3 percent interest on deposits, lending money out at 6 percent, and being able to "tee off at the golf course by 3 p.m."

The implication was that the banks were less competitive during that period than in subsequent years due to tight regulations that limited the formation and location of banks as well as restrictions on interest rates that could be charged or paid. As a result, bankers had "power and prestige ... while profits were steady and certain". These regulations were loosened in the 1980s.

Richmond Federal Reserve senior economist John R. Walter argues that, although there is evidence that restrictions on banks before the 1980s did limit the competitiveness of banking markets and thereby granted some banks monopoly power, "the regulatory restrictions probably had a limited effect on competition" during the time in question. Chicago Federal Reserve researchers Robert DeYoung and Tara Rice argue that, "Like most good jokes, the 3-6-3 rule mixes a grain of truth with a highly simplified view of reality."

The rule has been noted positively following the 2008 financial crisis as a preferable way for banks to operate following the bailout of major banks.

Australia's banking system, which was deregulated in the 1990s in a manner similar to that in the U.S., also came to be characterized in the same way as did the United Kingdom's.

== See also ==
- Banking in Australia
- Banking in the United States
