= Colonial history of the United States =

Colonial era of the United States of America
- 1607–1776
Pre-Columbian era	American Revolution - History of the United States (1776–1789)
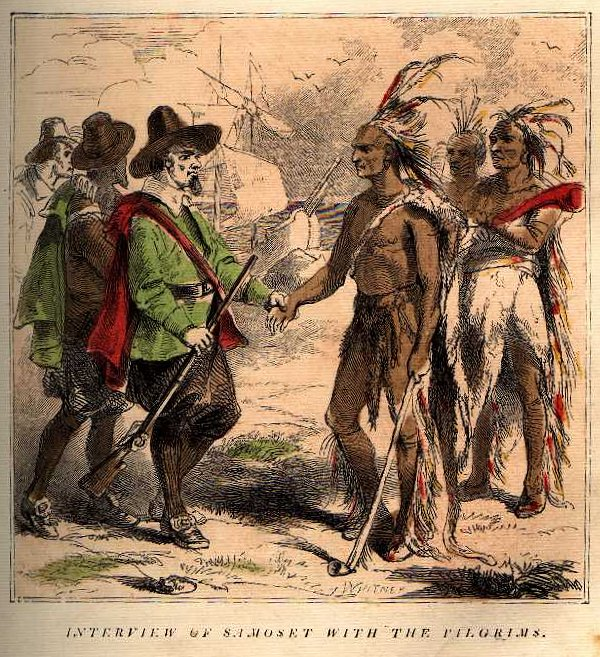
- The cover of Interview of Samoset with the Pilgrims, an 1853 book depicting Samoset's meeting the Pilgrims on March 16, 1621
- Location: United States (April 1607–July 1776)
- Key events: • European exploration of North America • European colonization and settlement • Native American population decline from epidemics • Atlantic slave trade

The colonial history of the United States covers the period of European colonization of North America from the early 17th century until the unifying of thirteen British colonies and creation of the United States in 1776, during the American War of Independence. Native Americans lived in the territory of North America prior to European colonization and were present throughout the colonial era. The Spanish were the first Europeans to establish a permanent settlement in what became the United States, at Saint Augustine, Florida (1565). Although Spain claimed sovereignty over all North America, its main interest was central Mexico with dense, hierarchically organized indigenous populations, who rendered tribute and labor to overlords, and newly discovered deposits of precious metals. Those resources made Spain wealthy. In the late sixteenth century, other European powers including England, France, and the Dutch Republic sought to replicate Spain's colonial success and launched colonization expeditions in North America in territory that Spain claimed but had not colonized.

English settlers in the Thirteen Colonies on the Atlantic seaboard came from a variety of social and religious groups, including adventurers, farmers, indentured servants, tradesmen, and a very few from the aristocracy. Settlers included the Dutch of New Netherland, the Swedes and Finns of New Sweden, the English Quakers of the Province of Pennsylvania, the English Puritans of New England, the Virginian Cavaliers, the English Catholics and Protestant Nonconformists of the Province of Maryland, the "worthy poor" of the Province of Georgia, the Germans who settled the mid-Atlantic colonies, and the Ulster Scots of the Appalachian Mountains. These groups all became part of the United States when it gained its independence in 1783. Parts of what had been New France were incorporated during the American Revolution and soon after. Parts of New Spain were incorporated in several stages, and Russian America was also incorporated into the United States at a later time. The diverse colonists from these various regions built colonies of distinctive social, religious, political, and economic style.

Over time, non-British colonies East of the Mississippi River were taken over and most of the inhabitants were assimilated. In Nova Scotia, however, the British expelled the French Catholic Acadians, and many refugees relocated to Louisiana. The two chief armed rebellions were short-lived failures in Virginia in 1676 and in New York in 1689–1691. Some of the colonies developed legalized systems of slavery, centered largely around the Atlantic slave trade. Wars were recurrent between the French and the British during the French and Indian Wars. By 1760, France was defeated and its colonies were seized by Britain.

On the eastern seaboard, the four distinct English regions were New England, the Middle Colonies, the Chesapeake Bay Colonies (Upper South), and the Southern Colonies (Lower South). Some historians add a fifth region of the "Frontier", which was never separately organized. The colonization of the United States resulted in a large decline of the indigenous population primarily because of newly introduced diseases. A significant percentage of the indigenous people living in the eastern region had been killed by disease before 1620, possibly introduced to them decades before by explorers and sailors (although no conclusive cause has been established).

== Goals of colonization ==
=== Mercantilism ===
Mercantilism was the basic policy imposed by Britain on its colonies from the 1660s, which meant that the government became a partner with merchants based in England to increase political power and private wealth. This was done to the exclusion of other empires and even other merchants in its own colonies. The government protected its London-based merchants and kept out others by trade barriers, regulations, and subsidies to domestic industries to maximize exports from the realm and minimize imports.

=== Freedom from religious persecution ===
The prospect of religious persecution by the authorities of the crown and the Church of England prompted a significant number of colonization efforts. The Pilgrims were separatist Puritans who fled persecution in England, first to the Netherlands and ultimately to Plymouth Plantation in 1620. Over the following 20 years, people fleeing persecution from King Charles I settled most of New England. Similarly, the Province of Maryland was founded in part to be a haven for Roman Catholics.

== Early colonial failures ==
After the turn of the 16th century, several European countries attempted to found colonies in what is now the United States. Most of those attempts ended in failure. The colonists themselves faced high rates of death from disease, starvation, inefficient resupply, conflict with Native Americans, attacks by rival European powers, and other causes.

Spain had numerous failed attempts, including San Miguel de Gualdape in South Carolina (1526), Pánfilo de Narváez's expedition to Florida's Gulf coast (1528–36), Pensacola in West Florida (1559–61), Fort San Juan in North Carolina (1567–68), and the Ajacán Mission in Virginia (1570–71). The French failed at Parris Island, South Carolina (1562–63), Fort Caroline on Florida's Atlantic coast (1564–65), Saint Croix Island, Maine (1604–05), and Fort Saint Louis, Texas (1685–89). The most notable English failures were the "Lost Colony of Roanoke" (1583–90) in North Carolina and Popham Colony in Maine (1607–08). It was at the Roanoke Colony that Virginia Dare became the first English child born in America; her fate is unknown.

== New Spain ==
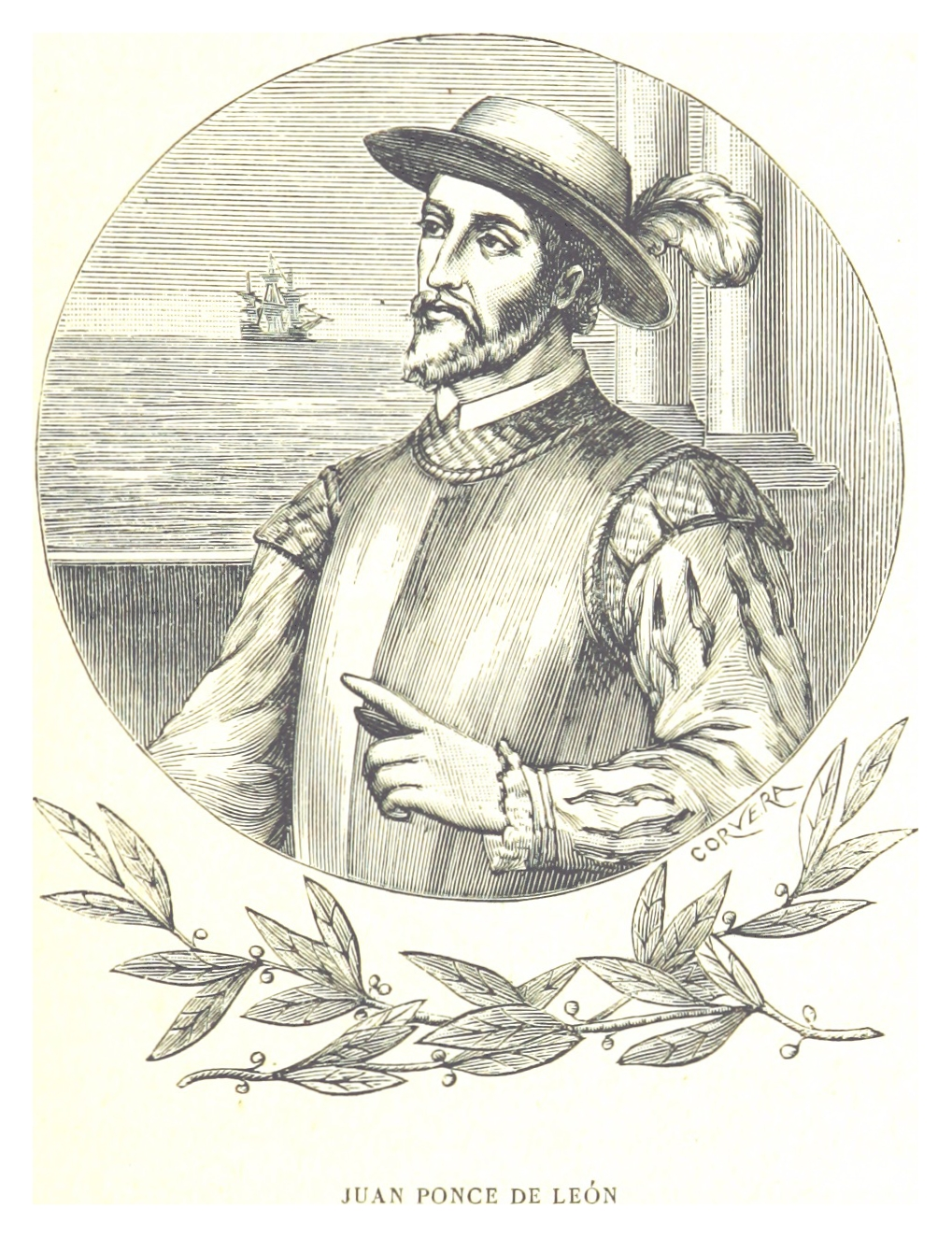
The Spaniard Juan Ponce de León, who named and explored Florida in 1513

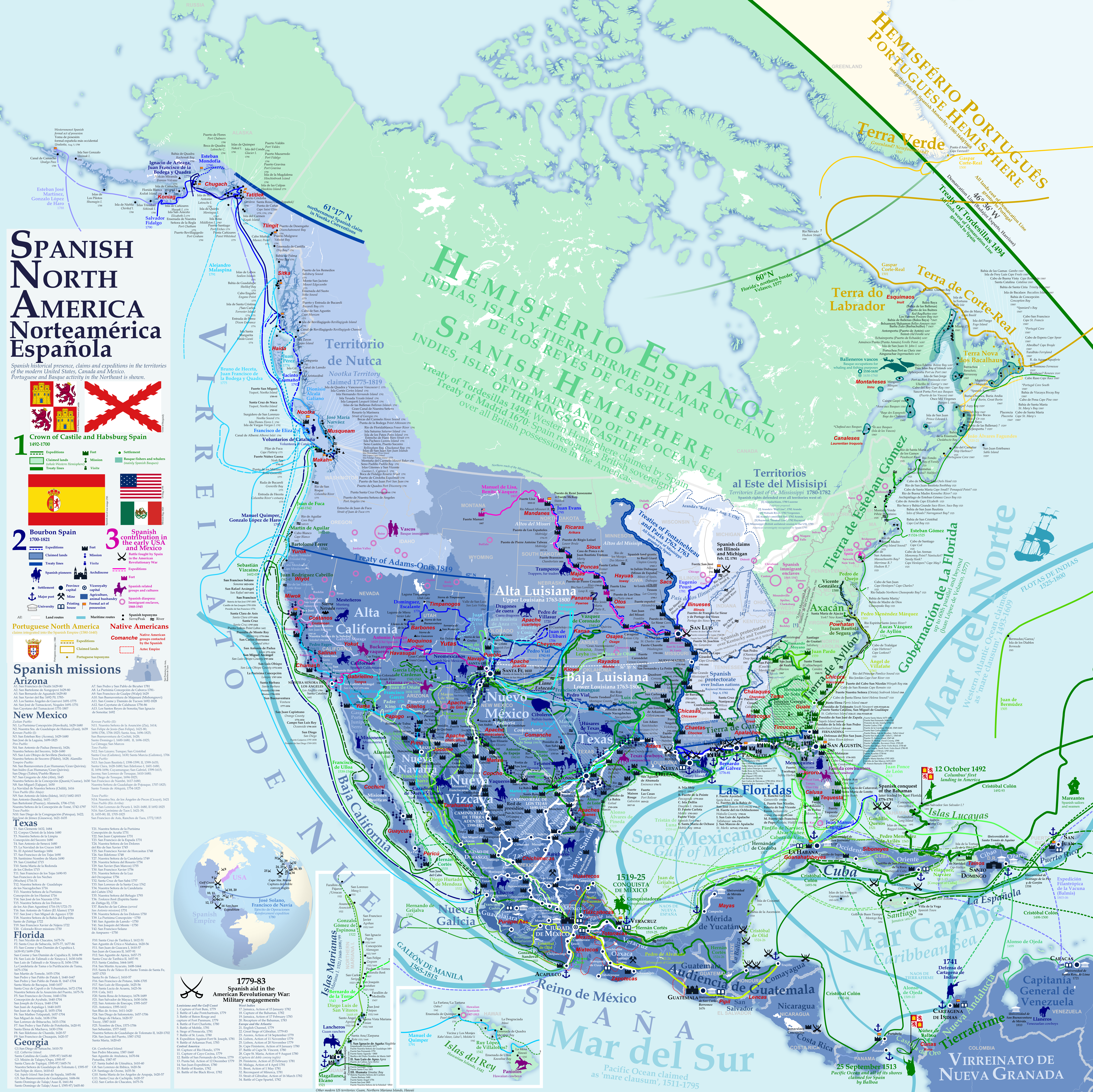
Spain's historical presence, including claimed territories, points of interest, and expeditions in North America

Starting in the 16th century, Spain built a colonial empire in the Americas consisting of New Spain and other vice-royalties. New Spain included territories in Florida, Alabama, Mississippi, much of the United States west of the Mississippi River, parts of Latin America (including Puerto Rico), and the Spanish East Indies (including Guam and the Northern Mariana Islands). New Spain encompassed the territory of Louisiana after the Treaty of Fontainebleau (1762), though Louisiana reverted to France in the 1800 Third Treaty of San Ildefonso.

Many territories that had been part of New Spain became part of the United States after 1776 through various wars and treaties, including the Louisiana Purchase (1803), the Adams–Onís Treaty (1819), the Mexican–American War (1846–1848), and the Spanish–American War (1898). There were also several Spanish expeditions to the Pacific Northwest, but Spain gave the United States all claims to the Pacific Northwest in the Adams–Onís Treaty. There were several thousand families in New Mexico and California who became American citizens in 1848, plus small numbers in the other colonies.

=== Florida ===
Spain established several small outposts in Florida in the early 16th century. The first was at Pensacola, Florida, in 1559 under Tristán de Luna y Arellano, though it was short-lived. The most important was St. Augustine, founded as Mission Nombre de Dios in 1565 but repeatedly attacked and burned by pirates, privateers, and English forces, and nearly all the Spanish left after the Treaty of Paris (1763) ceded Florida to Great Britain. Certain First Spanish Period structures remain today, especially those made of coquina, a limestone quarried nearby.

The British attacked Spanish Florida during numerous wars. As early as 1687, the Spanish government had begun to offer asylum to slaves from British colonies, and the Spanish Crown officially proclaimed in 1693 that runaway slaves would find freedom in Florida in return for converting to Catholicism and four years of military service to the Spanish Crown. In effect, Spaniards created a maroon settlement in Florida as a front-line defense against English attacks from the north. This settlement was centered at Fort Mose. Spain also intended to destabilize the plantation economy of the British colonies by creating a free black community to attract slaves. Notable British raids on St. Augustine were James Moore's 1702 raid and James Oglethorpe's 1740 siege.

In 1763, Spain traded Florida to Great Britain in exchange for control of Havana, Cuba, which the British had captured during the Seven Years' War. Florida was home to about 3,000 Spaniards at the time, and nearly all quickly left. Britain occupied Florida but did not send many settlers to the area. Dr. Andrew Turnbull's failed colony at New Smyrna, however, resulted in hundreds of Menorcans, Greeks, and Italians settling in St. Augustine in 1777. During the American Revolution, East and West Florida were Loyalist colonies. Spain regained control of Florida in 1783 by the Peace of Paris which ended the Revolutionary War. Spain sent no more settlers or missionaries to Florida during the Second Spanish Period. The inhabitants of West Florida revolted against the Spanish in 1810 and formed the Republic of West Florida, which was quickly annexed by the United States. The United States took possession of East Florida in 1821 according to the terms of the Adams–Onís Treaty.

=== Arizona and New Mexico ===
Throughout the 16th century, Spain explored the southwest from Mexico. The first expedition was the Niza expedition in 1538. Francisco Coronado followed with a larger expedition in 1539, throughout modern New Mexico and Arizona, arriving in New Mexico in 1540. The Spanish moved north from Mexico, settling villages in the upper valley of the Rio Grande, including much of the western half of the present-day state of New Mexico. The capital of Santa Fe was settled in 1610 and remains one of the oldest continually European-inhabited settlements in the United States. Local people expelled the Spanish for 12 years following the Pueblo Revolt of 1680; they returned in 1692 in the bloodless reoccupation of Santa Fe. Control was by Spain (223 years) and Mexico (25 years) until 1846, when the American Army of the West took over in the Mexican–American War. About a third of the population in the 21st century is descended from the Spanish settlers.

=== California ===
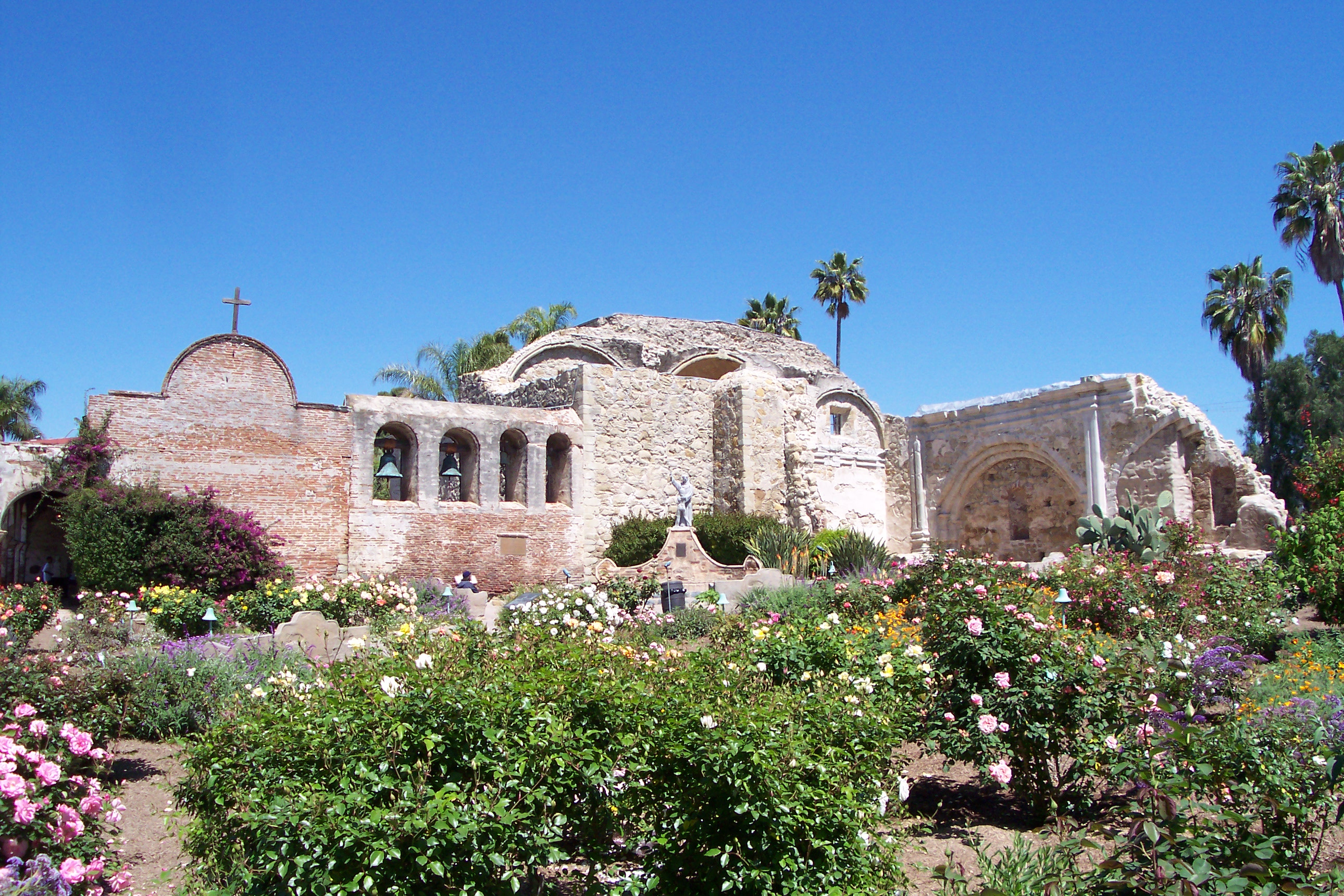
The ruins of the Spanish Mission San Juan Capistrano in present-day San Juan Capistrano, California

Spanish explorers sailed along the coast of present-day California starting with Cabrillo in 1542–43. From 1565 to 1815, Spanish galleons regularly arrived from Manila at Cape Mendocino, about 300 miles (480 km) north of San Francisco or farther south. Then they sailed south along the California coast to Acapulco, Mexico. Often they did not land, because of the rugged, foggy coast. Spain wanted a safe harbor for galleons. They did not find San Francisco Bay, perhaps because of fog hiding the entrance. In 1585 Gali charted the coast just south of San Francisco Bay, and in 1587 Unamuno explored Monterey Bay. In 1594 Soromenho explored and was shipwrecked in Drake's Bay just north of San Francisco Bay, then went south in a small boat past Half Moon Bay and Monterey Bay. They traded with Native Americans for food. In 1602 Vizcaino charted the coast from Lower California to Mendocino and some inland areas and recommended Monterey for settlement. The King agreed, but the settlement project was diverted to areas off Japan.

No settlements were established until 1769. From 1769 until the independence of Mexico in 1820, Spain sent missionaries and soldiers to Alta California who created a series of missions operated by Franciscan priests. They also operated presidios (forts), pueblos (settlements), and ranchos (land grant ranches), along the southern and central coast of California. Father Junípero Serra, founded the first missions in Spanish upper Las Californias, starting with Mission San Diego de Alcalá in 1769. Through the Spanish and Mexican eras they eventually comprised a series of 21 missions to spread Roman Catholicism among the local Native Americans, linked by El Camino Real ("The Royal Road"). They were established to convert the indigenous peoples of California, while protecting historic Spanish claims to the area. The missions introduced European technology, livestock, and crops. The Indian Reductions converted the native peoples into groups of Mission Indians; they worked as laborers in the missions and the ranchos. In the 1830s the missions were disbanded and the lands sold to Californios. The indigenous Native American population was around 150,000; the Californios (Mexican era Californians) around 10,000; including immigrant Americans and other nationalities involved in trade and business in California.

=== Puerto Rico ===
In September 1493, Christopher Columbus set sail on his second voyage with 17 ships from Cádiz. On November 19, 1493, he landed on the island of Puerto Rico, naming it San Juan Bautista in honor of Saint John the Baptist. The first European colony, Caparra, was founded on August 8, 1508, by Juan Ponce de León, a lieutenant under Columbus, who was greeted by the Taíno Cacique Agüeybaná and who later became the first governor of the island. Ponce de Leon was actively involved in the Higuey massacre of 1503 in Puerto Rico. In 1508, Sir Ponce de Leon was chosen by the Spanish Crown to lead the conquest and enslavement of the Taíno Indians for gold mining operations. The following year, the colony was abandoned in favor of a nearby island on the coast, named Puerto Rico (Rich Port), which had a suitable harbor. In 1511, a second settlement, San Germán was established in the southwestern part of the island. During the 1520s, the island took the name of Puerto Rico while the port became San Juan.

As part of the colonization process, African slaves were brought to the island in 1513. Following the decline of the Taíno population, more slaves were brought to Puerto Rico; however, the number of slaves on the island paled in comparison to those in neighboring islands. Also, early in the colonization of Puerto Rico, attempts were made to wrest control of Puerto Rico from Spain. The Caribs, a raiding tribe of the Caribbean, attacked Spanish settlements along the banks of the Daguao and Macao rivers in 1514 and again in 1521 but each time they were easily repelled by the superior Spanish firepower. However, these would not be the last attempts at control of Puerto Rico. The European powers quickly realized the potential of the lands not yet colonized by Europeans and attempted to gain control of them. Nonetheless, Puerto Rico remained a Spanish possession until the 19th century.

The last half of the 19th century was marked by the Puerto Rican struggle for sovereignty. A census conducted in 1860 revealed a population of 583,308. Of these, 300,406 (51.5%) were white and 282,775 (48.5%) were persons of color, the latter including people of primarily African heritage, mulattos and mestizos. The majority of the population in Puerto Rico was illiterate (83.7%) and lived in poverty, and the agricultural industry—at the time, the main source of income—was hampered by lack of road infrastructure, adequate tools and equipment, and natural disasters, including hurricanes and droughts. The economy also suffered from increasing tariffs and taxes imposed by the Spanish Crown. Furthermore, Spain had begun to exile or jail any person who called for liberal reforms. The Spanish–American War broke out in 1898, in the aftermath of the explosion of USS Maine in Havana Harbor. The U.S. defeated Spain by the end of the year, and won control of Puerto Rico in the ensuing peace treaty. In the Foraker Act of 1900, the U.S. Congress established Puerto Rico's status as an unincorporated territory.

== New France ==
Map of territorial claims in North America by 1750, before the French and Indian War, which was part of the greater worldwide conflict known as the Seven Years' War (1756 to 1763). Possessions of Britain (pink), France (blue), and Spain. (White border lines mark later Canadian Provinces and US States for reference)

New France was the vast area centered on the Saint Lawrence River, Great Lakes, Mississippi River, and other major tributary rivers that was explored and claimed by France starting in the early 17th century. It was composed of several colonies: Acadia, Canada, Newfoundland, Louisiana, Île-Royale (present-day Cape Breton Island), and Île Saint Jean (present-day Prince Edward Island). These colonies came under British or Spanish control after the French and Indian War, though France briefly re-acquired a portion of Louisiana in 1800. The United States would gain much of New France in the 1783 Treaty of Paris, and the U.S. would acquire another portion of French territory with the Louisiana Purchase of 1803. The remainder of New France became part of Canada, with the exception of the French islands of Saint Pierre and Miquelon.

The first French colonial empire stretched to over 10,000,000 km^{2} (3,900,000 sq mi) at its peak in 1710, which was the second largest colonial empire in the world, after the Spanish Empire.

=== Pays d'en Haut ===
By 1660, French fur trappers, missionaries, and military detachments based in Montreal pushed west along the Great Lakes upriver into the Pays d'en Haut and founded outposts at Green Bay, Fort de Buade and Saint Ignace (both at Michilimackinac), Sault Sainte Marie, Vincennes, and Detroit in 1701. During the French and Indian War (1754–1763) many of these settlements became occupied by the British. By 1773, the population of Detroit was 1,400. At the end of the War for Independence in 1783, the region south of the Great Lakes formally became part of the United States.

=== Arkansas and Illinois ===
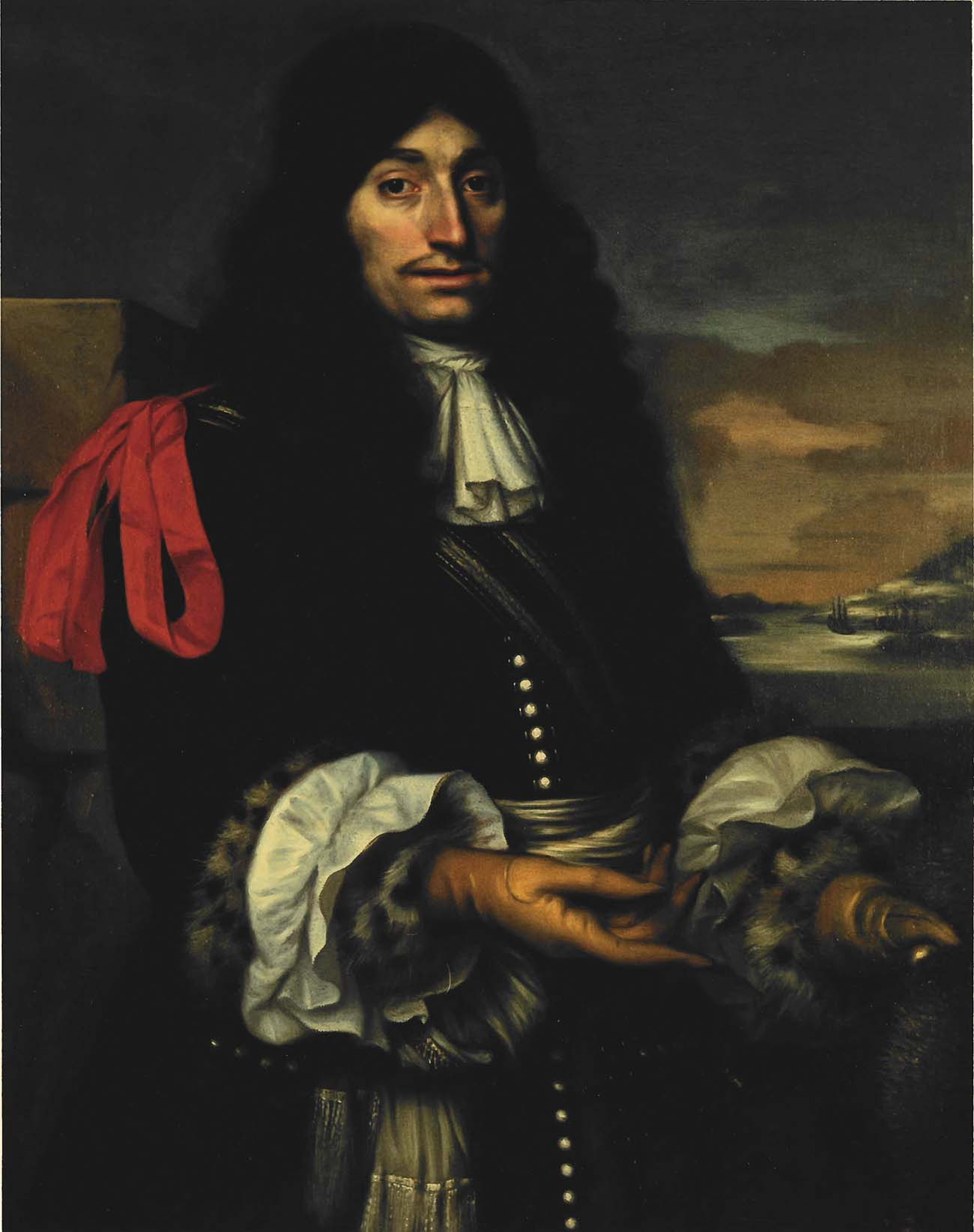
The Italian explorer Enrico Tonti, who founded the first European settlement in Illinois in 1679 and in Arkansas in 1683, known as Poste de Arkansea, making him "The Father of Arkansas". He co-founded New Orleans, and was governor of the Louisiana Territory for the next 20 years.

The Italian explorer Enrico Tonti, together with the French explorer René-Robert Cavelier, Sieur de La Salle, explored the Great Lakes region. Enrico Tonti founded the first European settlement in Illinois in 1679 and in Arkansas in 1683, known as Poste de Arkansea, making him "The Father of Arkansas". The Illinois Country by 1752 had a French population of 2,500; it was located to the west of the Ohio Country and was concentrated around Kaskaskia, Cahokia, and Sainte Genevieve. Enrico Tonti was one of the first explorers to navigate and sail the upper Great Lakes. He also sailed the Illinois and the Mississippi, to its mouth and thereupon claimed the length of the Mississippi for Louis XIV of France. He is credited with founding the settlement that would become Peoria, Illinois.

=== Louisiana ===
French claims to French Louisiana stretched thousands of miles from modern Louisiana north to the largely unexplored Midwest, and west to the Rocky Mountains. It was generally divided into Upper and Lower Louisiana. This vast tract was first settled at Mobile and Biloxi around 1700, and continued to grow reaching 7,000 French immigrants. René-Robert Cavelier, Sieur de La Salle and Enrico Tonti founded New Orleans, and Enrico Tonti was governor of the Louisiana Territory for the next 20 years. Settlement proceeded very slowly; New Orleans became an important port as the gateway to the Mississippi River, but there was little other economic development because the city lacked a prosperous hinterland.

In 1763, Louisiana was ceded to Spain around New Orleans and west of the Mississippi River. In the 1780s, the western border of the newly independent United States stretched to the Mississippi River. The United States reached an agreement with Spain for navigation rights on the river and was content to let the "feeble" colonial power stay in control of the area. The situation changed when Napoleon forced Spain to return Louisiana to France in 1802 and threatened to close the river to American vessels. Alarmed, the United States offered to buy New Orleans.

Napoleon needed funds to wage another war with Great Britain, and he doubted that France could defend such a huge and distant territory. He therefore offered to sell all of Louisiana for $15 million. The United States completed the Louisiana Purchase in 1803, doubling the size of the nation.

== New Netherland ==
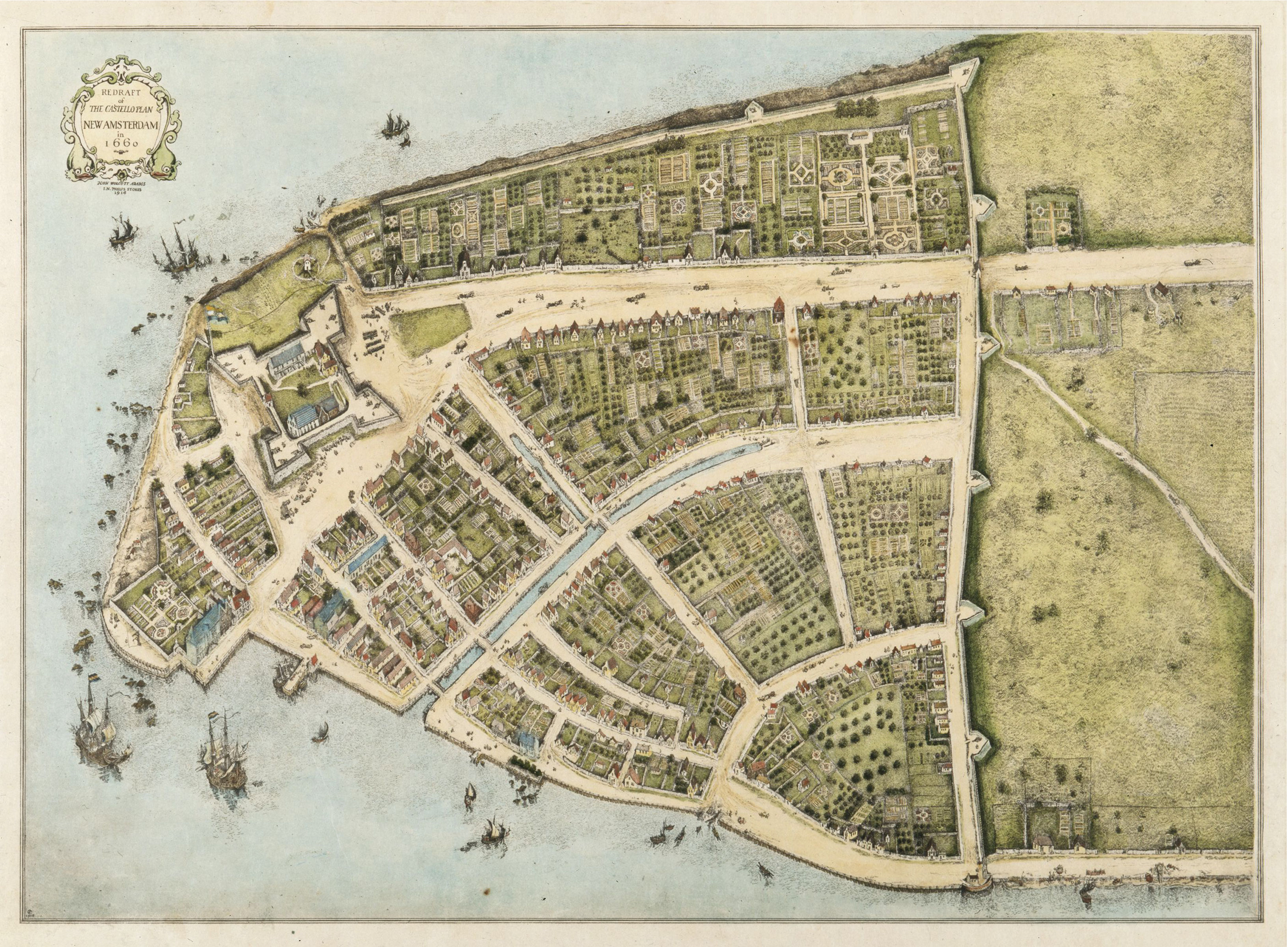
A 1660 map of New Amsterdam

Nieuw-Nederland, or New Netherland, was a colonial province of the Republic of the Seven United Netherlands chartered in 1614, in what became New York, New Jersey, and parts of other neighboring states. The peak population was less than 10,000. The Dutch established a patroon system with feudal-like rights given to a few powerful landholders; they also established religious tolerance and free trade. The colony's capital of New Amsterdam was founded in 1625 and located at the southern tip of the island of Manhattan, which grew to become a major world city.

The city was captured by the English in 1664; they took complete control of the colony in 1674 and renamed it New York. However the Dutch landholdings remained, and the Hudson River Valley maintained a traditional Dutch character until the 1820s. Traces of Dutch influence remain in present-day northern New Jersey and southeastern New York State, such as homes, family surnames, and the names of roads and whole towns.

== New Sweden ==
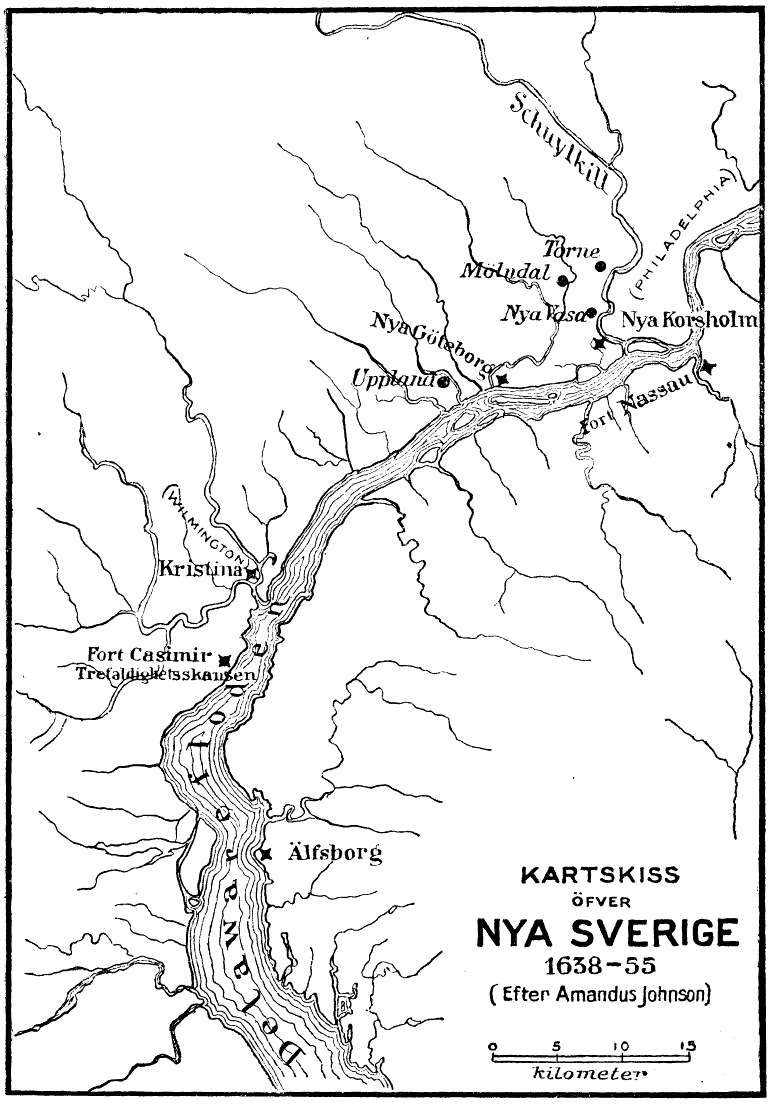
Map of New Sweden by Amandus Johnson

New Sweden (Swedish: Nya Sverige) was a Swedish colony that existed along the Delaware River Valley from 1638 to 1655 and encompassed land in present-day Delaware, southern New Jersey, and southeastern Pennsylvania. The several hundred settlers were centered around the capital of Fort Christina, at the location of what is today the city of Wilmington, Delaware. The colony also had settlements near the present-day location of Salem, New Jersey (Fort Nya Elfsborg) and on Tinicum Island, Pennsylvania. The colony was captured by the Dutch in 1655 and merged into New Netherland, with most of the colonists remaining. Years later, the entire New Netherland colony was incorporated into England's colonial holdings.

The colony of New Sweden introduced Lutheranism to America in the form of some of the continent's oldest European churches. The colonists also introduced the log cabin to America, and numerous rivers, towns, and families in the lower Delaware River Valley region derive their names from the Swedes.

== Russian colonies ==
Russia explored the area that became Alaska, starting with the Second Kamchatka expedition in the 1730s and early 1740s. Their first settlement was founded in 1784 by Grigory Shelikhov. The Russian-American Company was formed in 1799 with the influence of Nikolay Rezanov, for the purpose of buying sea otters for their fur from native hunters. In 1867, the U.S. purchased Alaska, and nearly all Russians abandoned the area except a few missionaries of the Russian Orthodox Church working among the natives.

== English colonies ==
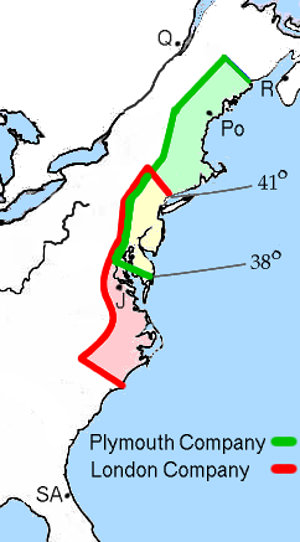
The 1606 grants by James I to the London and Plymouth companies; the overlapping area (in yellow) was granted to both companies on the stipulation that neither found a settlement within 100 miles (160 km) of each other; the location of the Jamestown Settlement is shown by "J"

England made its first successful efforts at the start of the 17th century for several reasons. During this era, English proto-nationalism and national assertiveness blossomed under the threat of Spanish invasion, assisted by a degree of Protestant militarism and the energy of Queen Elizabeth. At this time, however, there was no official attempt by the English government to create a colonial empire. Rather the motivation behind the founding of colonies was piecemeal and variable. Practical considerations played their parts, such as commercial enterprise, over-crowding, and the desire for freedom of religion. The main waves of settlement came in the 17th century. After 1700, most immigrants to Colonial America arrived as indentured servants, young unmarried men and women seeking a new life in a much richer environment. The consensus view among economic historians and economists is that the indentured servitude occurred largely as "an institutional response to a capital market imperfection," but that it "enabled prospective migrants to borrow against their future earnings in order to pay the high cost of passage to America." Between the late 1610s and the American Revolution, the British shipped an estimated 50,000 to 120,000 convicts to its American colonies.

Alexander Hamilton (1712–1756) was a Scottish-born doctor and writer who lived and worked in Annapolis, Maryland. Leo Lemay says that his 1744 travel diary Gentleman's Progress: The Itinerarium of Dr. Alexander Hamilton is "the best single portrait of men and manners, of rural and urban life, of the wide range of society and scenery in colonial America." His diary has been widely used by scholars, and covers his travels from Maryland to Maine. Biographer Elaine Breslaw says that he encountered:

the relatively primitive social milieu of the New World. He faced unfamiliar and challenging social institutions: the labor system that relied on black slaves, extraordinarily fluid social statuses, distasteful business methods, unpleasant conversational quirks, as well as variant habits of dress, food, and drink.

=== Chesapeake Bay area ===
==== Virginia ====
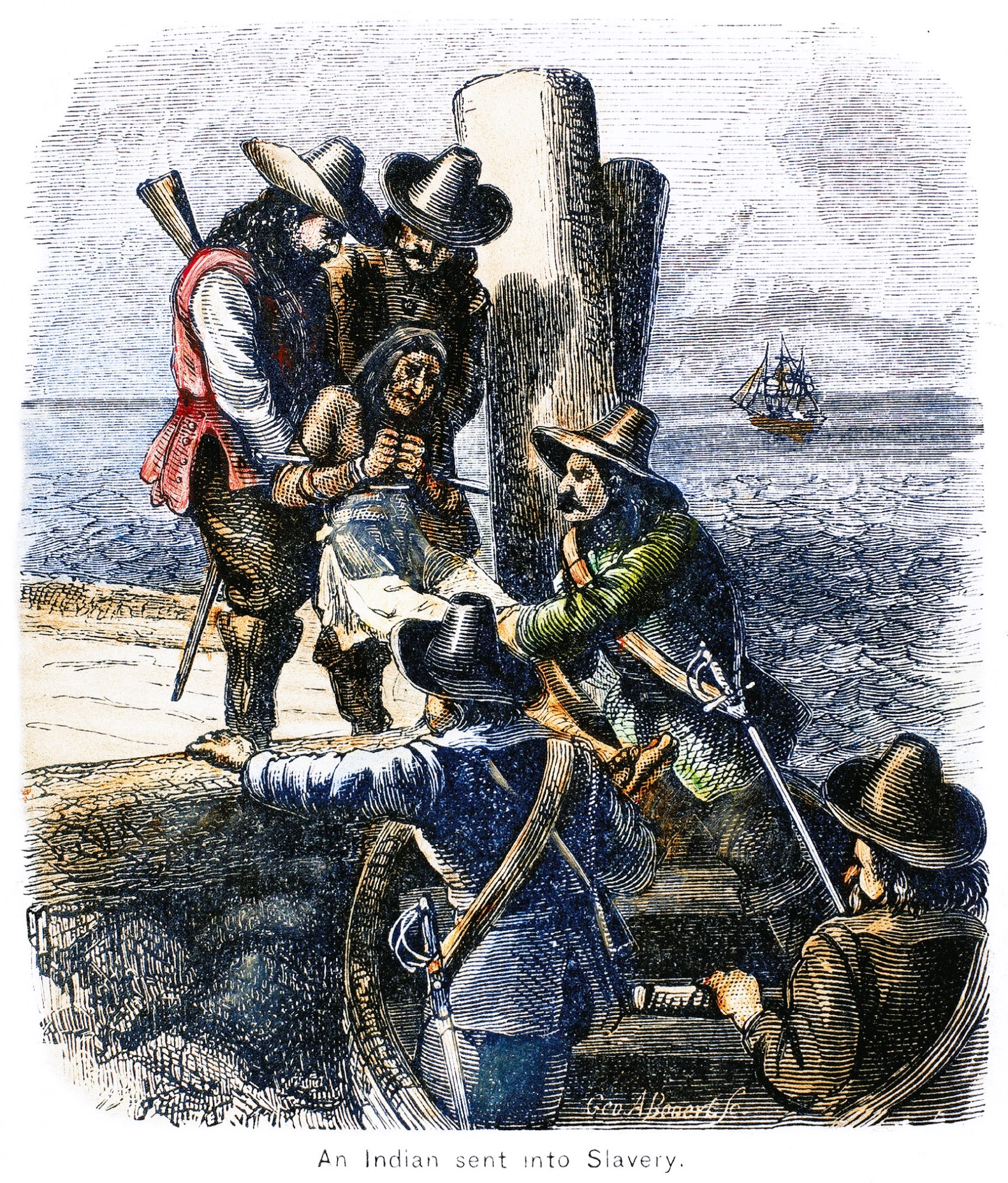
Native American being enslaved by Virginia colonists in the 17th century

The first successful English colony was Jamestown, established May 14, 1607, near Chesapeake Bay. The business venture was financed and coordinated by the London Virginia Company, a joint-stock company looking for gold. Its first years were extremely difficult, with very high death rates from disease and starvation, wars with indigenous nations, and little gold. The colony survived and flourished by turning to tobacco as a cash crop. By the late 17th century, Virginia's export economy was largely based on tobacco, and new, richer settlers came in to take up large portions of land, build large plantations and import indentured servants and slaves. In 1676, Bacon's Rebellion occurred, but was suppressed by royal officials. After Bacon's Rebellion, African slaves rapidly replaced indentured servants as Virginia's main labor force.

The colonial assembly shared power with a royally appointed governor. On a more local level, governmental power was invested in county courts, which were self-perpetuating (incumbents filled any vacancies and there never were popular elections). As cash crop producers, Chesapeake plantations were heavily dependent on trade with England. With easy navigation by river, there were few towns and no cities; planters shipped directly to Britain. High death rates and a very young population profile characterized the colony during its first years.

Randall Miller points out that "America had no titled aristocracy... although one aristocrat, Lord Thomas Fairfax, did take up residence in Virginia in 1734." Lord Fairfax (1693–1781) was a Scottish baron who came to America permanently to oversee his family's vast land holdings. Historian Arthur Schlesinger says that he "was unique among the permanent comers in bearing so high a rank as baron." He was a patron of George Washington and was not disturbed during the war.

=== New England ===
==== Puritans ====
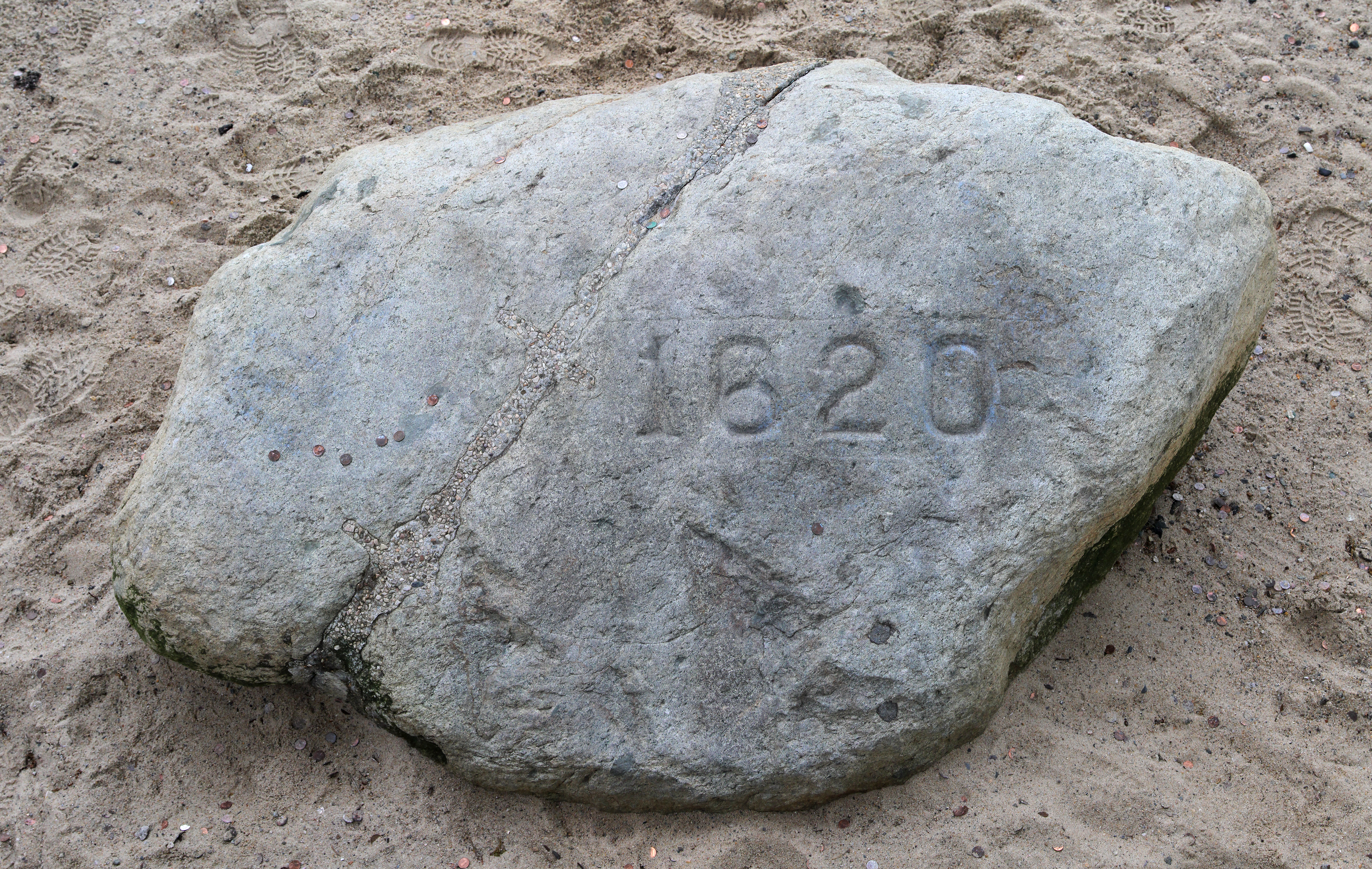
Plymouth Rock, commemorating the landing of the Mayflower in 1620

The Pilgrims were a small group of Puritan separatists who felt that they needed to physically distance themselves from the Church of England. They initially moved to the Netherlands, then decided to re-establish themselves in America. The initial Pilgrim settlers sailed to North America in 1620 on the Mayflower. Upon their arrival, they drew up the Mayflower Compact, by which they bound themselves together as a united community, thus establishing the small Plymouth Colony. William Bradford was their main leader. After its founding, other settlers traveled from England to join the colony.

The non-separatist Puritans constituted a much larger group than the Pilgrims, and they established the Massachusetts Bay Colony in 1629 with 400 settlers. They sought to reform the Church of England by creating a new, pure church in the New World. By 1640, 20,000 had arrived; many died soon after arrival, but the others found a healthy climate and an ample food supply. The Plymouth and Massachusetts Bay colonies together spawned other Puritan colonies in New England, including the New Haven, Saybrook, and Connecticut colonies. During the 17th century, the New Haven and Saybrook colonies were absorbed by Connecticut.

The Puritans created a deeply religious, socially tight-knit, and politically innovative culture that still influences the modern United States. They hoped that this new land would serve as a "redeemer nation". They fled England and attempted to create a "nation of saints" or a "City upon a Hill" in America: an intensely religious, thoroughly righteous community designed to be an example for all of Europe.

Economically, Puritan New England fulfilled the expectations of its founders. The Puritan economy was based on the efforts of self-supporting farmsteads that traded only for goods which they could not produce themselves, unlike the cash crop-oriented plantations of the Chesapeake region. There was a generally higher economic standing and standard of living in New England than in the Chesapeake. New England became an important mercantile and shipbuilding center, along with agriculture, fishing, and logging, serving as the hub for trading between the southern colonies and Europe.

==== Other New England ====
Providence Plantation was founded in 1636 by Roger Williams on land provided by Narragansett sachem Canonicus. Williams was a Puritan who preached religious tolerance, separation of Church and State, and a complete break with the Church of England. He was banished from the Massachusetts Bay Colony over theological disagreements, and he and other settlers founded Providence Plantation based on an egalitarian constitution providing for majority rule "in civil things" and "liberty of conscience" in religious matters. In 1637, a second group including Anne Hutchinson established a second settlement on Aquidneck Island, also known as Rhode Island.

Other colonists settled to the north, mingling with adventurers and profit-oriented settlers to establish more religiously diverse colonies in New Hampshire and Maine. These small settlements were absorbed by Massachusetts when it made significant land claims in the 1640s and 1650s. New Hampshire was eventually given a separate charter in 1679 against the wishes of the ruling Puritans. Maine remained a part of Massachusetts until achieving statehood in 1820.

==== Dominion of New England ====
Under King James II of England, the New England colonies, New York, and the Jerseys were briefly united as the Dominion of New England (1686–1689). The administration was eventually led by Governor Sir Edmund Andros and seized colonial charters, revoked land titles, and ruled without local assemblies, causing anger among the population. The 1689 Boston revolt was inspired by England's Glorious Revolution against James II and led to the arrest of Andros, Boston Anglicans, and senior dominion officials by the Massachusetts militia. Andros was jailed for several months, then returned to England. The Dominion of New England was dissolved and governments resumed under their earlier charters.

However, the Massachusetts charter had been revoked in 1684, and a new one was issued in 1691 that combined Massachusetts and Plymouth into the Province of Massachusetts Bay. King William III sought to unite the New England colonies militarily by appointing the Earl of Bellomont to three simultaneous governorships and military command over Connecticut and Rhode Island. However, these attempts at unified control failed.

=== Middle Colonies ===
The Middle Colonies consisted of the present-day states of New York, New Jersey, Pennsylvania, and Delaware and were characterized by a large degree of religious, political, economic, and ethnic diversity.

The Dutch colony of New Netherland was taken over by the English and renamed New York. However, large numbers of Dutch remained in the colony, dominating the rural areas between New York City and Albany. Meanwhile, Yankees from New England started moving in, as did immigrants from Germany. New York City attracted a large polyglot population, including a large black slave population.

New Jersey began as a division of New York, and was divided into the proprietary colonies of East and West Jersey for a time.

Pennsylvania was founded in 1681 as a proprietary colony of Quaker William Penn. The main population elements included the Quaker population based in Philadelphia, a Scotch Irish population on the Western frontier, and numerous German colonies in between. Philadelphia became the largest city in the colonies with its central location, excellent port, and a population of about 30,000.

By the mid-18th century, Pennsylvania was basically a middle-class colony with limited deference to the small upper-class. A writer in the Pennsylvania Journal summed it up in 1756:

The People of this Province are generally of the middling Sort, and at present pretty much upon a Level. They are chiefly industrious Farmers, Artificers or Men in Trade; they enjoy in [are fond of] Freedom, and the meanest among them thinks he has a right to Civility from the greatest.

=== South ===
The predominant culture of the south was rooted in the settlement of the region by British colonists. In the seventeenth century, most voluntary colonists were of English origins who settled chiefly along the coastal regions of the Eastern seaboard. The majority of early British settlers were indentured servants, who gained freedom after enough work to pay off their passage. The wealthier men who paid their way received land grants known as headrights, to encourage settlement.

The French and Spanish established colonies in Florida, Louisiana, and Texas. The Spanish colonized Florida in the 16th century, with their communities reaching a peak in the late 17th century. In the British and French colonies, most colonists arrived after 1700. They cleared land, built houses and outbuildings, and worked on the large plantations that dominated export agriculture. Many were involved in the labor-intensive cultivation of tobacco, the first cash crop of Virginia. With a decrease in the number of British willing to go to the colonies in the eighteenth century, planters began importing more enslaved Africans, who became the predominant labor force on the plantations. Tobacco exhausted the soil quickly, requiring new fields to be cleared on a regular basis. Old fields were used as pasture and for crops such as corn and wheat, or allowed to grow into woodlots.

Rice cultivation in South Carolina became another major commodity crop. Some historians have argued that slaves from the lowlands of western Africa, where rice was a basic crop, provided key skills, knowledge and technology for irrigation and construction of earthworks to support rice cultivation. The early methods and tools used in South Carolina were congruent with those in Africa. British colonists would have had little or no familiarity with the complex process of growing rice in fields flooded by irrigation works.

In the mid- to late-18th century, large groups of Scots and Ulster-Scots (later called the Scots-Irish) immigrated and settled in the back country of Appalachia and the Piedmont. They were the largest group of colonists from the British Isles before the American Revolution. In a census taken in 2000 of Americans and their self-reported ancestries, areas where people reported 'American' ancestry were the places where, historically, many Scottish, Scotch-Irish and English Borderer Protestants settled in America: the interior as well as some of the coastal areas of the South, and especially the Appalachian region. The population with some Scots and Scots-Irish ancestry may number 47 million, as most people have multiple heritages, some of which they may not know.

The early colonists, especially the Scots-Irish in the back-country, engaged in warfare, trade, and cultural exchanges. Those living in the backcountry were more likely to join with Muscogee, Cherokee, and Choctaws and other regional native groups.

The oldest university in the South, The College of William & Mary, was founded in 1693 in Virginia; it pioneered in the teaching of political economy and educated future U.S. Presidents Jefferson, Monroe and Tyler, all from Virginia. Indeed, the entire region dominated politics in the First Party System era: for example, four of the first five presidents—Washington, Jefferson, Madison, and Monroe—were from Virginia. The two oldest public universities are also in the South: the University of North Carolina (1795) and the University of Georgia (1785).

The colonial South included the plantation colonies of the Chesapeake region (Virginia, Maryland, and, by some classifications, Delaware) and the lower South (Carolina, which eventually split into North and South Carolina; and Georgia).

==== Chesapeake society ====
The top five percent or so of the white population of Virginia and Maryland in the mid-18th century were planters who possessed growing wealth and increasing political power and social prestige. They controlled the local Anglican church, choosing ministers and handling church property and disbursing local charity. They sought election to the House of Burgesses or appointment as justice of the peace.

About 60 percent of white Virginians were part of a broad middle class that owned substantial farms. By the second generation, death rates from malaria and other local diseases had declined so much that a stable family structure was possible.

The bottom third owned no land and verged on poverty. Many were recent arrivals, recently released from indentured servitude. In some districts near present-day Washington DC, 70 percent of the land was owned by a handful of families, and three-fourths of the whites had no land at all. Large numbers of Irish and German Protestants had settled in the frontier districts, often moving down from Pennsylvania. Tobacco was not important here; farmers focused on hemp, grain, cattle, and horses. Entrepreneurs had begun to mine and melt the local iron ores.

Sports occupied a great deal of attention at every social level, starting at the top. In England, hunting was sharply restricted to landowners and enforced by armed gamekeepers. In America, game was plentiful. Everyone could and did hunt, including servants and slaves. Poor men with good rifle skills won praise; rich gentlemen who were off target won ridicule. In 1691, governor Sir Francis Nicholson organized competitions for the "better sort of Virginians onely who are Batchelors," and he offered prizes "to be shot for, wrestled, played at backswords, & Run for by Horse and foott."

Horse racing was the main event. The typical farmer did not own a horse in the first place, and racing was a matter for gentlemen only, but ordinary farmers were spectators and gamblers. The race was a major public event designed to demonstrate to the world the superior social status of the gentry through expensive breeding, training, boasting, and gambling, and especially winning the races themselves. Historian Timothy Breen explains that horse racing and high-stakes gambling were essential to maintaining the status of the gentry. When they publicly bet a large sum on their favorite horse, it told the world that competitiveness, individualism, and materialism were the core elements of gentry values.

By 1700, the Virginia population reached 70,000 and continued to grow rapidly from a high birth rate, low death rate, importation of slaves from the Caribbean, and immigration from Britain, Germany, and Pennsylvania. The climate was mild; the farm lands were cheap and fertile.

==== Carolinas ====
The Province of Carolina was the first attempted English settlement south of Virginia. It was a private venture, financed by a group of English Lords Proprietors who obtained a royal charter to the Carolinas in 1663, hoping that a new colony in the south would become profitable like Jamestown, Virginia. Carolina was not settled until 1670, and even then the first attempt failed because there was no incentive for emigration to that area. Eventually, however, the Lords combined their remaining capital and financed a settlement mission to the area led by Sir John Colleton. The expedition located fertile and defensible ground at what became Charleston, originally Charles Town for Charles II of England. The original settlers in South Carolina established a lucrative trade in food for the slave plantations in the Caribbean. The settlers came mainly from the English colony of Barbados and brought enslaved Africans with them. Barbados was a wealthy sugarcane plantation island, one of the early English colonies to use large numbers of Africans in plantation-style agriculture. The cultivation of rice was introduced during the 1690s and became an important export crop.

At first, South Carolina was politically divided. Its ethnic makeup included the original settlers (a group of rich, slave-owning English settlers from the island of Barbados) and Huguenots, a French-speaking community of Protestants. Nearly continuous frontier warfare during the era of King William's War and Queen Anne's War drove economic and political wedges between merchants and planters. The disaster of the 1715 Yamasee War threatened the colony's viability and set off a decade of political turmoil. By 1729, the proprietary government had collapsed, and the Proprietors sold both colonies back to the British crown.

North Carolina had the smallest upper-class. The richest 10 percent owned about 40 percent of all land, compared to 50 to 60 percent in neighboring Virginia and South Carolina. There were no cities of any size and very few towns, so there was scarcely an urban middle class at all. Heavily rural North Carolina was dominated by subsistence farmers with small operations. In addition, one-fourth of the whites had no land at all.

==== Georgia ====
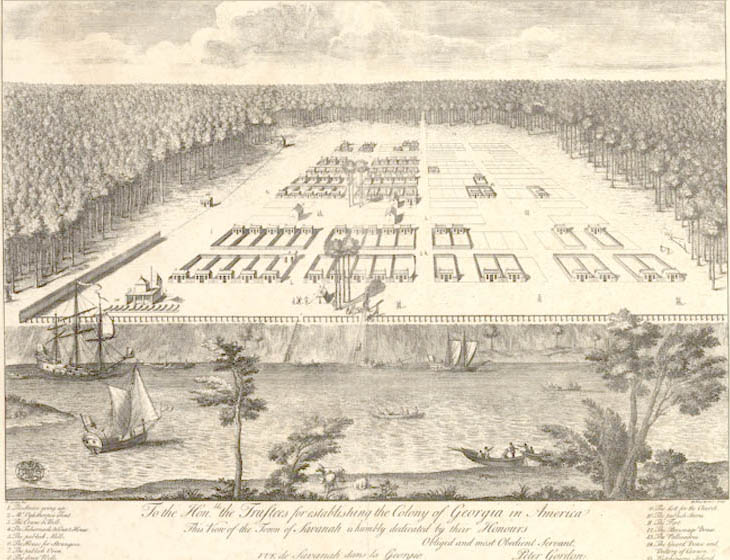
Savannah in the Province of Georgia in the early 18th century

British Member of Parliament James Oglethorpe established the Georgia Colony in 1733 as a solution to two problems. At that time, tension was high between Spain and Great Britain, and the British feared that Spanish Florida was threatening the British Carolinas. Oglethorpe decided to establish a colony in the contested border region of Georgia and to populate it with debtors who would otherwise have been imprisoned according to standard British practice. This plan would both rid Great Britain of its undesirable elements and provide her with a base from which to attack Florida. The first colonists arrived in 1733.

Georgia was established on strict moralistic principles. Slavery was officially forbidden, as were alcohol and other forms of immorality. However, the reality of the colony was far different. The colonists rejected a moralistic lifestyle and complained that their colony could not compete economically with the Carolina rice plantations. Georgia initially failed to prosper, but the restrictions were eventually lifted, slavery was allowed, and it became as prosperous as the Carolinas. The colony of Georgia never had an established religion; it consisted of people of various faiths.

==== East and West Florida ====
Spain ceded Florida to Great Britain in 1763, which established the colonies of East and West Florida. The Floridas remained loyal to Great Britain during the American Revolution. They were returned to Spain in 1783 in exchange for the Bahamas, at which time most of the British left. The Spanish then neglected the Floridas; few Spaniards lived there when the US bought the area in 1819.

== Unification of the British colonies ==
=== Colonial wars ===
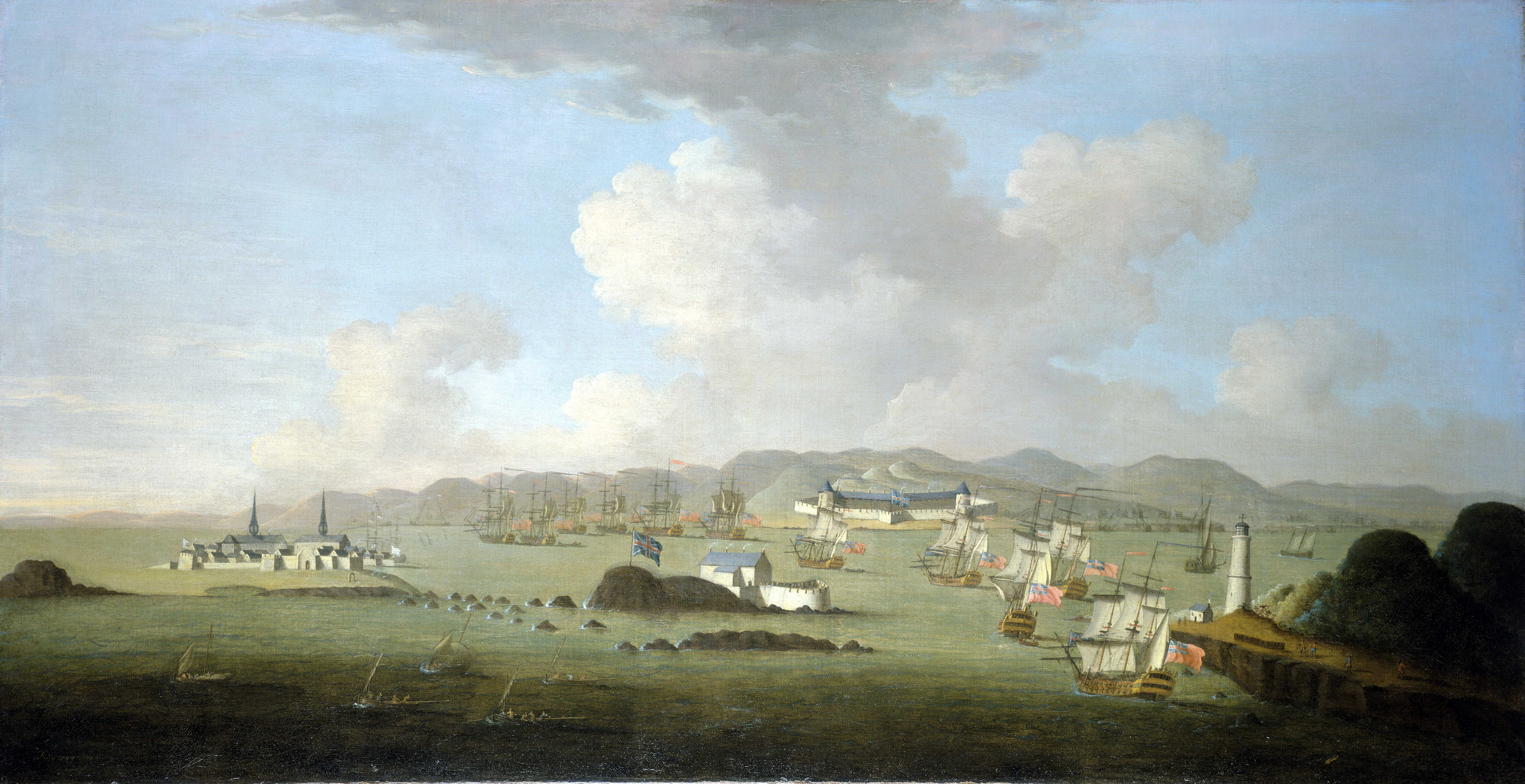
The Siege of Louisbourg, a 1745 illustration by Peter Monamy

Efforts began as early as the 1640s toward a common defense of the colonies, principally against shared threats from indigenous peoples defending their lands, the French, and the Dutch. The Puritan colonies of New England formed a confederation to coordinate military and judicial matters. From the 1670s, several royal governors attempted to find means of coordinating defensive and offensive military matters, notably Sir Edmund Andros (who governed New York, New England, and Virginia at various times) and Francis Nicholson (governed Maryland, Virginia, Nova Scotia, and Carolina). After King Phillips War, Andros successfully negotiated the Covenant Chain, a series of treaties with indigenous nations that brought relative calm to the frontiers of the middle colonies for many years.

The northern colonies experienced numerous assaults from the Wabanaki Confederacy and the French from Acadia during the four French and Indian Wars, particularly present-day Maine and New Hampshire, as well as Father Rale's War and Father Le Loutre's War.

One event that reminded colonists of their shared identity as British subjects was the War of the Austrian Succession (1740–1748) in Europe. This conflict spilled over into the colonies, where it was known as "King George's War". The major battles took place in Europe, but American colonial troops fought the French and their indigenous allies in New York, New England, and Nova Scotia with the Siege of Louisbourg (1745).

At the Albany Congress of 1754, Benjamin Franklin proposed that the colonies be united by a Grand Council overseeing a common policy for defense, expansion, and relations with indigenous peoples. The plan was thwarted by colonial legislatures and King George II, but it was an early indication that the British colonies of North America were headed towards unification.

==== French and Indian War ====
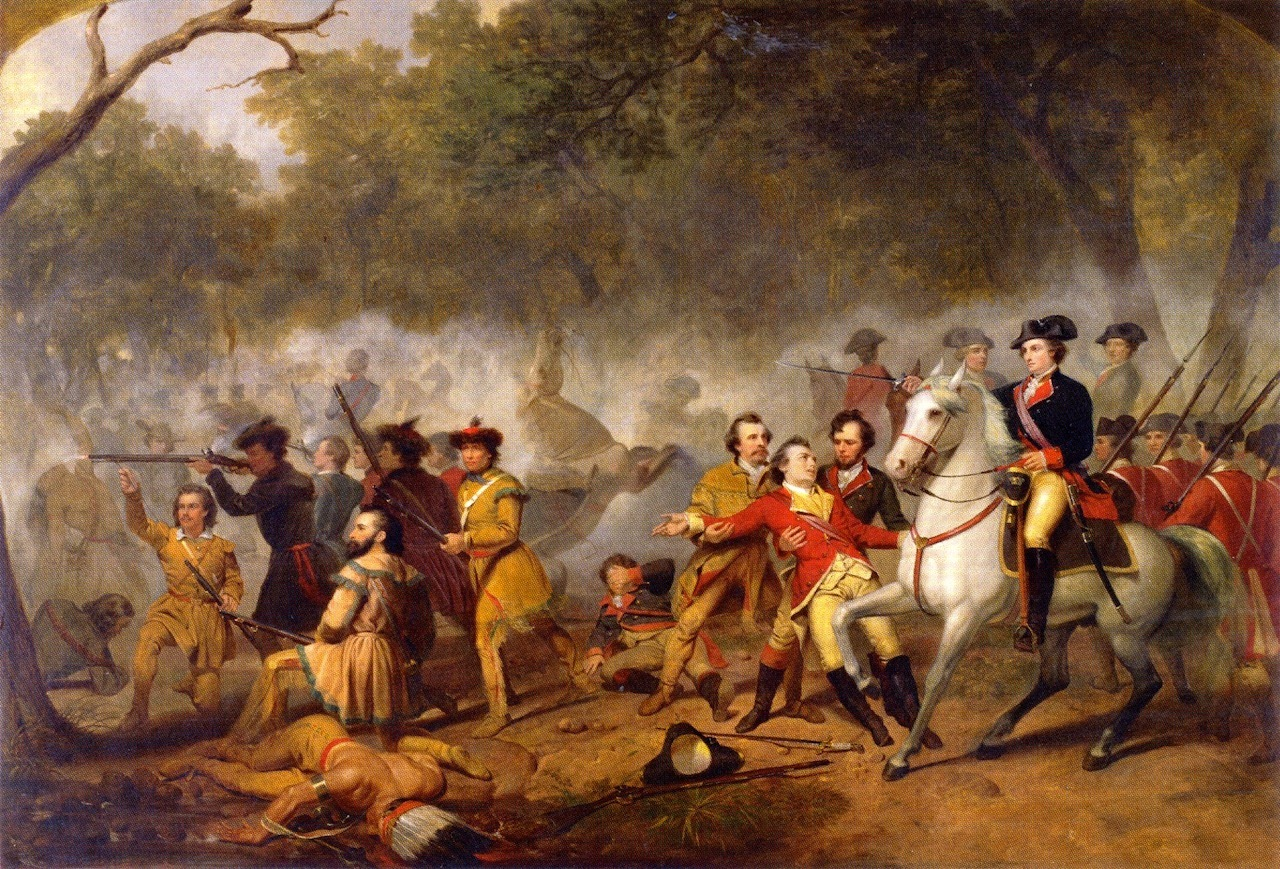
A portrait of George Washington during the French and Indian War

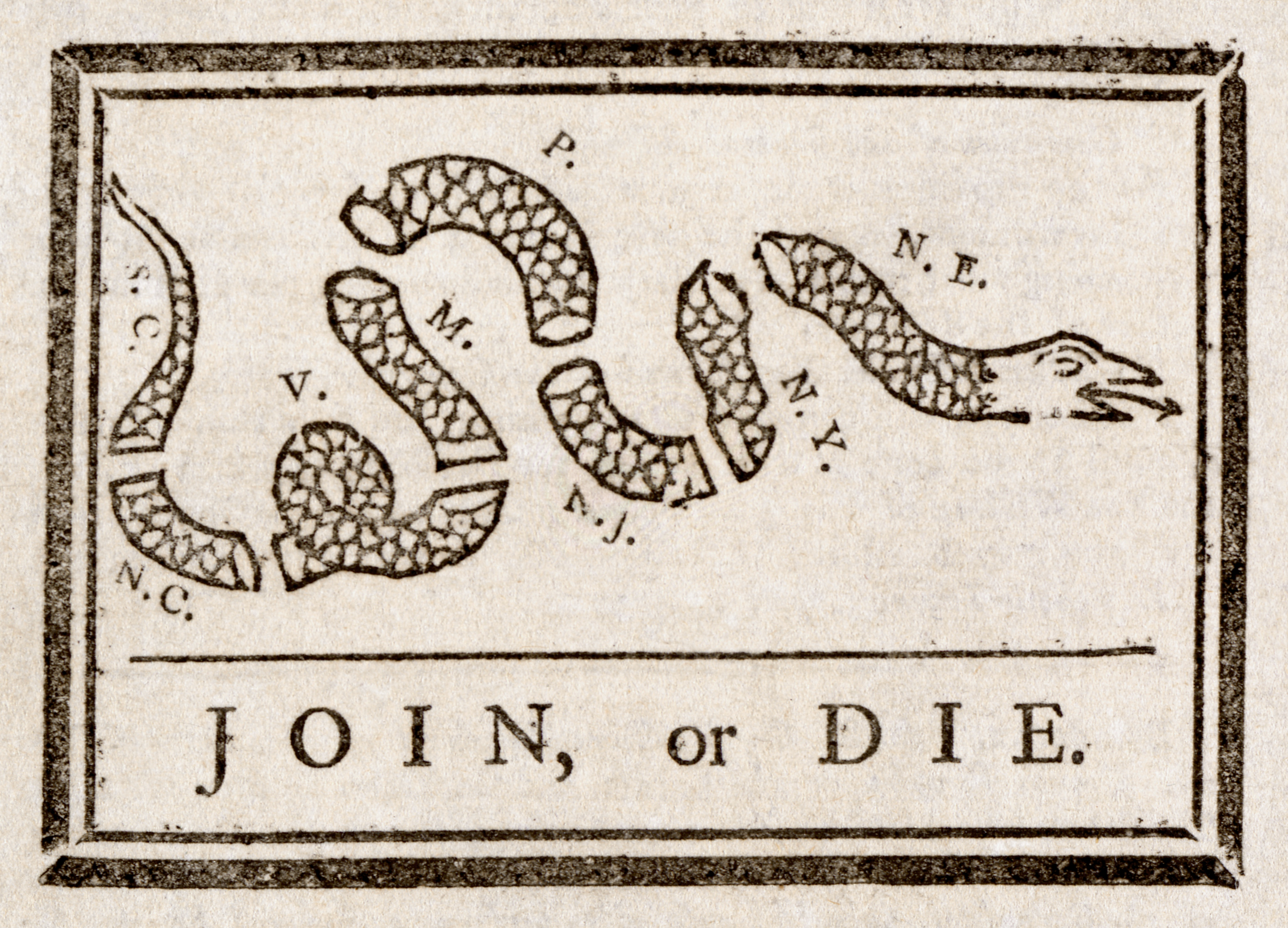
Benjamin Franklin's political cartoon Join, or Die called for colonial unity during the French and Indian War and reemerged several decades later in support of the American Revolution.

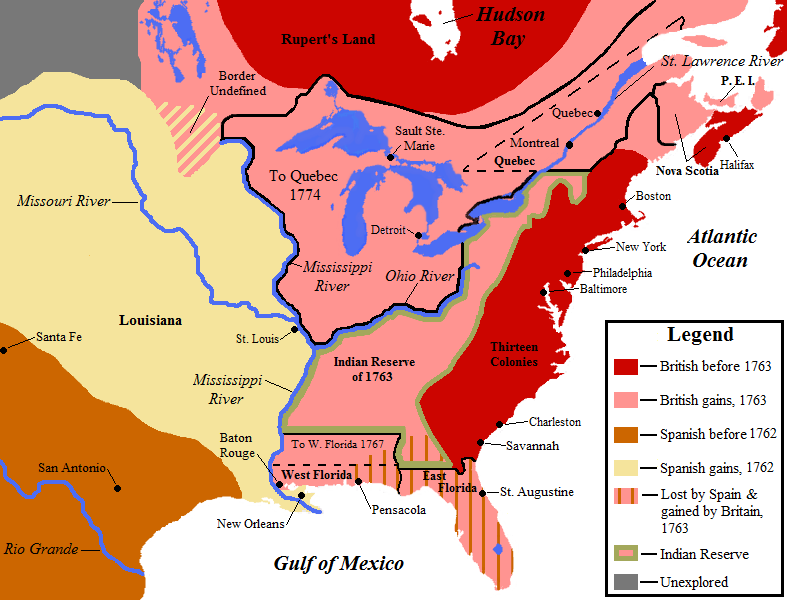
Territorial changes following the French and Indian War; land held by Britain prior to 1763 is shown in red; land gained by Britain in 1763 is shown in pink.

The French and Indian War (1754–1763) was the American extension of the general European conflict known as the Seven Years' War. Previous colonial wars in North America had started in Europe and then spread to the colonies, but the French and Indian War is notable for having started in North America and spread to Europe. One of the primary causes of the war was increasing competition between Britain and France, especially in the Great Lakes and Ohio valley.

The French and Indian War took on a new significance for the British North American colonists when William Pitt the Elder decided that major military resources needed to be devoted to North America to win the war against France. For the first time, the continent became one of the main theaters of what could be termed a "world war". During the war, the position of the British colonies as part of the British Empire was made truly apparent, as British military and civilian officials took on an increased presence in the lives of Americans.

The war also increased a sense of American unity in other ways. It caused men to travel across the continent who might otherwise have never left their own colony, fighting alongside men from decidedly different backgrounds who were nonetheless still "American". Throughout the course of the war, British officers trained American ones for battle, most notably George Washington, which benefitted the American cause during the Revolution. Also, colonial legislatures and officials had to cooperate intensively, for the first time, in pursuit of the continent-wide military effort. The relations between the British military establishment and the colonists were not always positive, setting the stage for later distrust and dislike of British troops.

In the 1763 Treaty of Paris, France formally ceded to Britain the eastern part of its vast North American empire, having secretly given to Spain the territory of Louisiana west of the Mississippi River the previous year. Before the war, Britain held the thirteen American colonies, most of present-day Nova Scotia, and most of the Hudson Bay watershed. Following the war, Britain gained all French territory east of the Mississippi River, including Quebec, the Great Lakes, and the Ohio River valley. Britain also gained Spanish Florida, from which it formed the colonies of East and West Florida. In removing a major foreign threat to the thirteen colonies, the war also largely removed the colonists' need of colonial protection.

The British and colonists triumphed jointly over a common foe. The colonists' loyalty to the mother country was stronger than ever before. However, disunity was beginning to form. British Prime Minister William Pitt the Elder had decided to wage the war in the colonies with the use of troops from the colonies and tax funds from Britain itself. This was a successful wartime strategy but, after the war was over, each side believed that it had borne a greater burden than the other. The British elite, the most heavily taxed of any in Europe, pointed out angrily that the colonists paid little to the royal coffers. The colonists replied that their sons had fought and died in a war that served European interests more than their own. This dispute was a link in the chain of events that soon brought about the American Revolution.

=== Ties to British Empire ===
The colonies were very different from one another but they were still a part of the British Empire in more than just name. Demographically, the majority of the colonists traced their roots to the British Isles and many of them still had family ties with Great Britain. Socially, the colonial elite of Boston, New York, Charleston, and Philadelphia saw their identity as British. Many had never lived in Britain in over a few generations, yet they imitated British styles of dress, dance, and etiquette. This social upper echelon built its mansions in the Georgian style, copied the furniture designs of Thomas Chippendale, and participated in the intellectual currents of Europe, such as the Enlightenment. The seaport cities of colonial America were truly British cities in the eyes of many inhabitants.

Many of the political structures of the colonies drew upon the republicanism expressed by opposition leaders in Britain, most notably the Commonwealth men and the Whig traditions. Many Americans at the time saw the colonies' systems of governance as modeled after the British constitution of the time, with the king corresponding to the governor, the House of Commons to the colonial assembly, and the House of Lords to the governor's council. The codes of law of the colonies were often drawn directly from English law; indeed, English common law survives not only in Canada, but also throughout the United States. Eventually, it was a dispute over the meaning of some of these political ideals (especially political representation) and republicanism that led to the American Revolution.

Another point on which the colonies found themselves more similar than different was the booming import of British goods. The British economy had begun to grow rapidly at the end of the 17th century and, by the mid-18th century, small factories in Britain were producing much more than the nation could consume. Britain found a market for their goods in the British colonies of North America, increasing her exports to that region by 360% between 1740 and 1770. British merchants offered credit to their customers; this allowed Americans to buy a large amount of British goods. From Nova Scotia to Georgia, all British subjects bought similar products, creating and anglicizing a sort of common identity.

=== Atlantic world ===
In recent years, historians have enlarged their perspective to cover the entire Atlantic world in a subfield now known as Atlantic history. Of special interest are such themes as international migration, trade, colonization, comparative military and governmental institutions, the transmission of religions and missionary work, and the slave trade. It was the Age of the Enlightenment, and ideas flowed back and forth across the Atlantic, with Philadelphian Benjamin Franklin playing a major role.

In 2008, Francois Furstenberg offered a different perspective on the historical period. He suggested that warfare was critical among the major imperial players: Britain, the American colonies, Spain, France, and the First Nations. They fought a series of conflicts from 1754 to 1815 that Furstenberg calls a "Long War for the West" over control of the region.

Women played a role in the emergence of the capitalist economy in the Atlantic world. The types of local commercial exchange in which they participated independently were well integrated with the trade networks between colonial merchants throughout the Atlantic region, especially markets in dairy and produce commodities. For example, local women merchants were important suppliers of foodstuffs to transatlantic shipping concerns.

=== Growing dissent and the American Revolution ===
In the colonial era, Americans insisted on their rights as Englishmen to have their own legislature raise all taxes. The British Parliament, however, asserted in 1765 that it held supreme authority to lay taxes, and a series of American protests began that led directly to the American Revolution. The first wave of protests attacked the Stamp Act of 1765, and marked the first time that Americans met together from each of the 13 colonies and planned a common front against British taxation. The Boston Tea Party of 1773 dumped British tea into Boston Harbor because it contained a hidden tax that Americans refused to pay. The British responded by trying to crush traditional liberties in Massachusetts, leading to the launch of the Revolutionary War in 1775.

The idea of independence steadily became more widespread, after being first proposed and advocated by a number of public figures and commentators throughout the colonies. One of the most prominent voices on behalf of independence was Thomas Paine, whose pamphlet Common Sense was published in 1776. Another group that called for independence was the Sons of Liberty, which had been founded in 1765 in Boston by Samuel Adams and which was now becoming even more strident and numerous.

The British Parliament began a series of taxes and punishments which met more and more resistance: First Quartering Act (1765); Declaratory Act (1766); Townshend Revenue Act (1767); and Tea Act (1773). In response to the Boston Tea Party, Parliament passed the Intolerable Acts: Second Quartering Act (1774); Quebec Act (1774); Massachusetts Government Act (1774); Administration of Justice Act (1774); Boston Port Act (1774); Prohibitory Act (1775). By this point, the 13 colonies had organized themselves into the Continental Congress and begun setting up independent governments and drilling their militia in preparation for war.

=== Impacts of colonialism ===
The idea that nature and humans are separate entities can be traced back to European colonial views. To European settlers, land was an inherited right and was to be used to profit. While native groups saw their relationship with the land in a more holistic view, they were eventually subjected to European property systems. Colonists from Europe saw the American landscape as wild, savage, dark, a waste, and thus needed to be tamed in order for it to be safe and habitable. Once cleared and settled, these areas were depicted as "Eden itself."

The advent of European colonization resulted in the disruption of existing social structures in indigenous lands. Settlers integrated themselves into the indigenous economy by exchanging resources, including corn and beaver pelts.

Europeans' introduction of the mortgage marked a significant shift, allowing items to be purchased on credit and transforming colonial possessions from material objects to land. Exploiting conceptual differences in property between colonists and indigenous communities, land became private property for the former while remaining communal for the latter.

Foreclosure on unpaid debts, encompassing both land and material objects, became a potent colonial tool of dispossession, amplifying indigenous debt and fortifying the colonial military force. Seeking legal remedies, indigenous communities occasionally made decisions collectively, introducing an element of uncertainty in the financial dynamics of credit.

Within European culture, land was an inherited right for each family's firstborn and every other child would need to find another way to claim land. European expansion would be motivated by this desire to claim land, but other factors were for religion (e.g. Crusades) and discovery (e.g. voyages). Yet the commodities didn't end with the acquisition of land. Profit became the main driver for all resources that would follow (including slavery). The cultural divide that existed between Europeans and the native groups they colonized allowed the Europeans to capitalize on both the local and global trade.

== Colonial life ==
=== British colonial government ===
In the British colonies, the three forms of government were provincial (royal colony), proprietary, and charter. These governments were all subordinate to the King of England, with no explicit relationship with the British Parliament. Beginning late in the 17th century, the administration of all British colonies was overseen by the Board of Trade in London. Each colony had a paid colonial agent in London to represent its interests.

New Hampshire, New York, Virginia, North Carolina, South Carolina, Georgia, and eventually Massachusetts were crown colonies. The provincial colony was governed by commissions created at the pleasure of the king. A governor and (in some provinces) his council were appointed by the crown. The governor was invested with general executive powers and authorized to call a locally elected assembly. The governor's council would sit as an upper house when the assembly was in session, in addition to its role in advising the governor. Assemblies were made up of representatives elected by the freeholders and planters (landowners) of the province. The governor had the power of absolute veto and could prorogue (i.e., delay) and dissolve the assembly. The assembly's role was to make all local laws and ordinances, ensuring that they were not inconsistent with the laws of England. In practice, this did not always occur, since many of the provincial assemblies sought to expand their powers and limit those of the governor and crown. Laws could be examined by the British Privy Council or Board of Trade, which also held veto power of legislation.

Pennsylvania (which included Delaware), New Jersey, and Maryland were proprietary colonies. They were governed much as royal colonies except that lord proprietors, rather than the king, appointed the governor. They were set up after the Restoration of 1660 and typically enjoyed greater civil and religious liberty.

Massachusetts, Providence Plantation, Rhode Island, Warwick, and Connecticut were charter colonies. The Massachusetts charter was revoked in 1684 and was replaced by a provincial charter that was issued in 1691. Charter governments were political corporations created by letters patent, giving the grantees control of the land and the powers of legislative government. The charters provided a fundamental constitution and divided powers among legislative, executive, and judicial functions, with those powers being vested in officials.

==== Political culture ====
The primary political cultures of the United States had their origins in the colonial period. Most theories of political culture identify New England, the Mid-Atlantic, and the South as having formed separate and distinct political cultures.

As Bonomi shows, the most distinctive feature of colonial society was the vibrant political culture, which attracted the most talented and ambitious young men into politics. First, suffrage was the most generous in the world, with every man allowed to vote who owned a certain amount of property. Fewer than one-percent of British men could vote, whereas a majority of American freemen were eligible. The roots of democracy were present, although deference was typically shown to social elites in colonial elections.

Second, a very wide range of public and private business was decided by elected bodies in the colonies, especially the assemblies and county governments in each colony. They handled land grants, commercial subsidies, and taxation, as well as oversight of roads, poor relief, taverns, and schools. Americans sued each other at a very high rate, with binding decisions made not by a great lord but by local judges and juries. This promoted the rapid expansion of the legal profession, so that the intense involvement of lawyers in politics became an American characteristic by the 1770s.

Third, the American colonies were exceptional in the world because of the representation of many different interest groups in political decision-making. The American political culture was open to economic, social, religious, ethnic, and geographical interests, with merchants, landlords, petty farmers, artisans, Anglicans, Presbyterians, Quakers, Germans, Scotch Irish, Yankees, Yorkers, and many other identifiable groups taking part. Elected representatives learned to listen to these interests because 90% of the men in the lower houses lived in their districts, unlike England where it was common to have an absentee member of Parliament. All of this was very unlike Europe, where aristocratic families and the established church were in control.

Finally, the Americans were fascinated by and increasingly adopted the political values of Republicanism which stressed equal rights, the need for virtuous citizens, and the evils of corruption, luxury, and aristocracy. Republicanism provided the framework for colonial resistance to British schemes of taxation after 1763, which escalated into the Revolution.

None of the colonies had stable political parties of the sort that formed in the 1790s, but each had shifting factions that vied for power, especially in the perennial battles between the appointed governor and the elected assembly. There were often "country" and "court" factions, representing those opposed to the governor's agenda and those in favor of it, respectively. Massachusetts had particularly low requirements for voting eligibility and strong rural representation in its assembly from its 1691 charter; consequently, it also had a strong populist faction that represented the province's lower classes.

Up and down the colonies, non-English ethnic groups had clusters of settlements. The most numerous were Scottish Irish and German. Each group assimilated into the dominant English, Protestant, commercial, and political culture, which included several local variations. They tended to vote in blocs, and politicians negotiated with group leaders for votes. They generally retained their historic languages and cultural traditions, even as they merged into the developing American culture.

Ethnocultural factors were most visible in Pennsylvania. Between 1756 and 1776, the Quakers were the largest faction in the legislature, but they were losing their dominance to the growing Presbyterian faction based on Scotch-Irish votes, supported by Germans.

=== Medical conditions ===
Mortality was very high for new arrivals, and high for children in the colonial era. Malaria was deadly to many new arrivals in the Southern colonies. For an example of newly arrived able-bodied young men, over one-fourth of the Anglican missionaries died within five years of their arrival in the Carolinas.

Mortality was high for infants and small children, especially from diphtheria, yellow fever, and malaria. Most sick people turned to local healers and used folk remedies. Others relied upon the minister-physicians, barber-surgeons, apothecaries, midwives, and ministers; a few used colonial physicians trained either in Britain or an apprenticeship in the colonies. There was little government control, regulation of medical care, or attention to public health. Colonial physicians introduced modern medicine to the cities in the 18th century, following the models in England and Scotland, and made some advances in vaccination, pathology, anatomy, and pharmacology.

=== Religion ===
The first religious services held in colonial America were Anglican services held in Jamestown, Virginia, according to the Book of Common Prayer. The practice of the religion of the Church of England in Jamestown predates that of the Pilgrim settlers who came on the Mayflower in 1620 and whose separatist faith motivated their move from Europe. The Spanish set up a network of Catholic missions in California, but they had all closed decades before 1848 when California became a state. There were a few important French Catholic churches and institutions in New Orleans.

Most of the settlers came from Protestant backgrounds in England and Western Europe, with a small proportion of Catholics, chiefly in Maryland, and a few Jews in port cities. The English and the Germans brought along multiple Protestant denominations. Several colonies had an established church, which meant that local tax money went to the denomination. Freedom of religion became a basic American principle, and numerous new movements emerged, many of which became established denominations in their own right. The Puritans of New England kept in close touch with non-conformists in England, as did the Quakers and the Methodists.

Church membership statistics by denomination are unreliable and scarce from the colonial period, but Anglicans were not in the majority by the time of the American Revolutionary War and probably did not comprise even 30 percent of the population in the Southern Colonies (Maryland, Virginia, North Carolina, South Carolina, and Georgia) where the Church of England was the established church. There were approximately 2,900 churches in the Thirteen Colonies by the time of the Revolutionary War, of which 82 to 84 percent were affiliated with non-Anglican Protestant denominations, with 76 to 77 percent specifically affiliated with British Dissenter denominations (Congregational, Presbyterian, Baptist, or Quaker) or continental Calvinists (Dutch Reformed or German Reformed), 5 to 8 percent being Lutheran; there was also a population of approximately 10,000 Methodists. 14 to 16 percent remained Anglican but were declining in number, and the remaining 2 percent of the churches were Catholic.

Three of the New England Colonies had established churches prior to the Revolutionary War, all Congregational (Massachusetts Bay, Connecticut, and New Hampshire), while the Middle Colonies (New York, New Jersey, Pennsylvania, and Delaware) and the Colony of Rhode Island and Providence Plantations had no established churches. Local taxes paid the salary of the clergy in the established churches, and the parish had civic responsibilities such as poor relief and promoting education. The local gentry controlled the budget, rather than the clergy. Anglicans in America were under the authority of the Bishop of London, who sent out missionaries and ordained men from the Colonies to minister in American parishes.

Historians debate how influential Christianity was in the era of the American Revolution. Many of the founding fathers were active in a local church; some of them had Deist sentiments, such as Jefferson, Franklin, and Washington. Catholics were few outside of Maryland; however, they joined the Patriot cause during the Revolution. Leaders such as George Washington strongly endorsed tolerance for them and indeed for all denominations.

==== Great Awakening ====
The First Great Awakening was the nation's first major religious revival, occurring in the middle of the 18th century, and it injected new vigor into Christian faith. It was a wave of religious enthusiasm among Protestants that swept the colonies in the 1730s and 1740s, leaving a permanent impact on American religion. Jonathan Edwards was a key leader and a powerful intellectual in colonial America. George Whitefield came over from England and made many converts.

The Great Awakening emphasized the traditional Reformed virtues of Godly preaching, rudimentary liturgy, and a deep awareness of personal sin and redemption by Christ Jesus, spurred on by powerful preaching that deeply affected listeners. Pulling away from ritual and ceremony, the Great Awakening made religion personal to the average person.

The Awakening had a major impact in reshaping the Congregational, Presbyterian, Dutch Reformed, and German Reformed denominations, and it strengthened the small Baptist and Methodist denominations. It brought Christianity to the slaves and was a powerful event in New England that challenged established authority. It incited rancor and division between the new revivalists and the old traditionalists who insisted on ritual and liturgy. The Awakening had little impact on Anglicans and Quakers.

The First Great Awakening focused on people who were already church members, unlike the Second Great Awakening that began around 1800 and reached out to the unchurched. It changed their rituals, their piety, and their self-awareness. The new style of sermons and the way that people practiced their faith breathed new life into religion in America. People became passionately and emotionally involved in their religion, rather than passively listening to intellectual discourse in a detached manner. Ministers who used this new style of preaching were generally called "new lights", while the traditional-styled preachers were called "old lights".

People began to study the Bible at home, which effectively decentralized the means of informing the public on religious manners and was akin to the individualistic trends present in Europe during the Protestant Reformation.

=== Women's roles ===
The experiences of women varied greatly from colony to colony during the colonial era. In New England, the Puritan settlers brought their strong religious values with them to the New World, which dictated that a woman be submissive to her husband and dedicate herself to rearing God-fearing children to the best of her ability.

There were ethnic differences in the treatment of women. Among Puritan settlers in New England, wives almost never worked in the fields with their husbands. In German communities in Pennsylvania, however, many women worked in fields and stables. German and Dutch immigrants granted women more control over property, which was not permitted in the local English law. Unlike English colonial wives, German and Dutch wives owned their own clothes and other items and were also given the ability to write wills disposing of the property brought into the marriage.

Like the many wives of founders and soldiers of the American Revolution, Mary Bartlett's life "shows how crucial a role these women played while their husbands fought the battles and formed the laws of the new nation. It was not just that they were making it all work at home, they were also passionate patriots themselves, engaged in the government and the war just as their husbands, sons, brothers, fathers, and friends were", according to Cokie Roberts in Founding Mothers : The women who raised our nation.

Work for women included running establishments based on their culinary skills. The first restaurant in the colonies belonged to Goody Armitage in Massachusetts in 1643. Leisure activity for women of the time included playing the clavier, harpsichord, clavichord and the organ. Women (as well as men) danced in balls especially after 1700. These dances had a strict social code with mistakes in choreography scrutinized and a loss of prestige would follow with excessive dance errors.

By the mid-18th century, the values of the American Enlightenment became established and weakened the view that husbands were natural "rulers" over their wives. There was a new sense of shared marriage. Legally, husbands took control of wives' property when marrying. Divorce was almost impossible until the late 18th century.

=== Slavery ===
Slaves transported to America:

- 1620–1700: 21,000
- 1701–1760: 189,000
- 1761–1770: 63,000
- 1771–1790: 56,000
- 1791–1800: 79,000
- 1801–1810: 124,000
- 1810–1865: 51,000
- Total: 583,000

About 305,326 slaves were transported to America, or less than 2% of the 12 million slaves taken from Africa. The great majority went to sugarcane-growing colonies in the Caribbean and Brazil, where life expectancy was short and the numbers had to be continually replenished. Life expectancy was much greater in the American colonies because of better food, less disease, lighter workloads, and better medical care, so the population grew rapidly, reaching 4 million by the 1860 census. From 1770 until 1860, the birth rate of American slaves was much greater than for the population of any nation in Europe, and was nearly twice as rapid as that of England.

The conditions the Caribbean and Brazilian enslaved populations endured in the early colonial years prompted many attempts at fleeing plantation work. Successfully escaped slaves often fled to "maroon communities'' which were populated with former slaves along with local Native Americans that helped shelter the recently escaped. Subsequent treaties with Maroon communities suggest that these communities were a burden on South American and Caribbean plantations. While the inhumane working conditions coupled with slave revolts in the Caribbean Islands and Brazilian plantations called for the increased imports of African slaves, in the colonies many plantation owners recognized their ability to maintain a generation of slaves for the economic benefit of allowing natural reproduction to increase the population. This led to the following generations of the enslaved population to be American born.

==== Slave rebellions ====
Colonial slave rebellions before 1776, or before 1801 for Louisiana, include:

- San Miguel de Gualdape (1526)
- Gloucester County, Virginia Revolt (1663)
- New York Slave Revolt of 1712
- Samba Rebellion (1731)
- Stono Rebellion (1739)
- New York Slave Insurrection of 1741
- 1791 Mina conspiracy
- Pointe Coupée conspiracy (1794)

=== Urban life ===
Historian Carl Bridenbaugh examined in depth five key cities: Boston (population 16,000 in 1760), Newport, Rhode Island (population 7500), New York City (population 18,000), Philadelphia (population 23,000), and Charles Town (Charlestown, South Carolina) (population 8000). He argues they grew from small villages to take major leadership roles in promoting trade, land speculation, immigration, and prosperity, and in disseminating the ideas of the Enlightenment, and new methods in medicine and technology. Furthermore, they sponsored a consumer taste for English amenities, developed a distinctly American educational system, and began systems for care of people in need. The colonial governments were much less powerful and intrusive than corresponding national governments in Europe. They experimented with new methods to raise revenue, build infrastructure, and solve urban problems. They were more democratic than European cities, in that a large fraction of the men could vote, and class lines were more fluid. Contrasted to Europe, printers (especially as newspaper editors) had a much larger role in shaping public opinion, and lawyers moved easily back and forth between politics and their profession. Bridenbaugh argues that by the mid-18th century, the middle-class businessmen, professionals, and skilled artisans dominated the cities.

There were few cities in the entire South, and Charleston (Charles Town) and New Orleans were the most important before the American Civil War broke out in 1861. The Province of Carolina was settled mainly by planters from the overpopulated British sugar island colony of Barbados, who brought large numbers of African slaves from that island.

=== New England ===
In New England, the Puritans created self-governing communities of religious congregations of farmers, or yeomen, and their families. High-level politicians gave out plots of land to settlers, or proprietors, who then divided the land amongst themselves. Large portions were usually given to men of higher social standing, but every man who wasn't indentured or criminally bonded had enough land to support a family. Every male citizen had a voice in the town meeting. The town meeting levied taxes, built roads, and elected officials who managed town affairs. The towns did not have courts; that was a function of the county, whose officials were appointed by the state government.

The Congregational church which the Puritans founded was not automatically joined by all New England residents because of Puritan beliefs that God singled out specific people for salvation. Instead, membership was limited to those who could convincingly "test" before members of the church that they had been saved. They were known as "the elect" or "Saints."

In 1652, the Massachusetts General Court authorized Boston silversmith John Hull to produce local coinage in shilling, sixpence and threepence denominations to address a coin shortage in the colony. To that point, the colony's economy had been entirely dependent on barter and foreign currency, including English, Spanish, Dutch, Portuguese, and counterfeit coins. In 1661 after the restoration of the monarchy, the English government considered the Boston mint to be treasonous. However, the colony ignored the English demands to cease operations until at least 1682, when Hull's contract as mintmaster expired, and the colony did not move to renew his contract or appoint a new mintmaster. The coinage was a contributing factor to the revocation of the Massachusetts Bay Colony charter in 1684.

==== Farm and family life ====
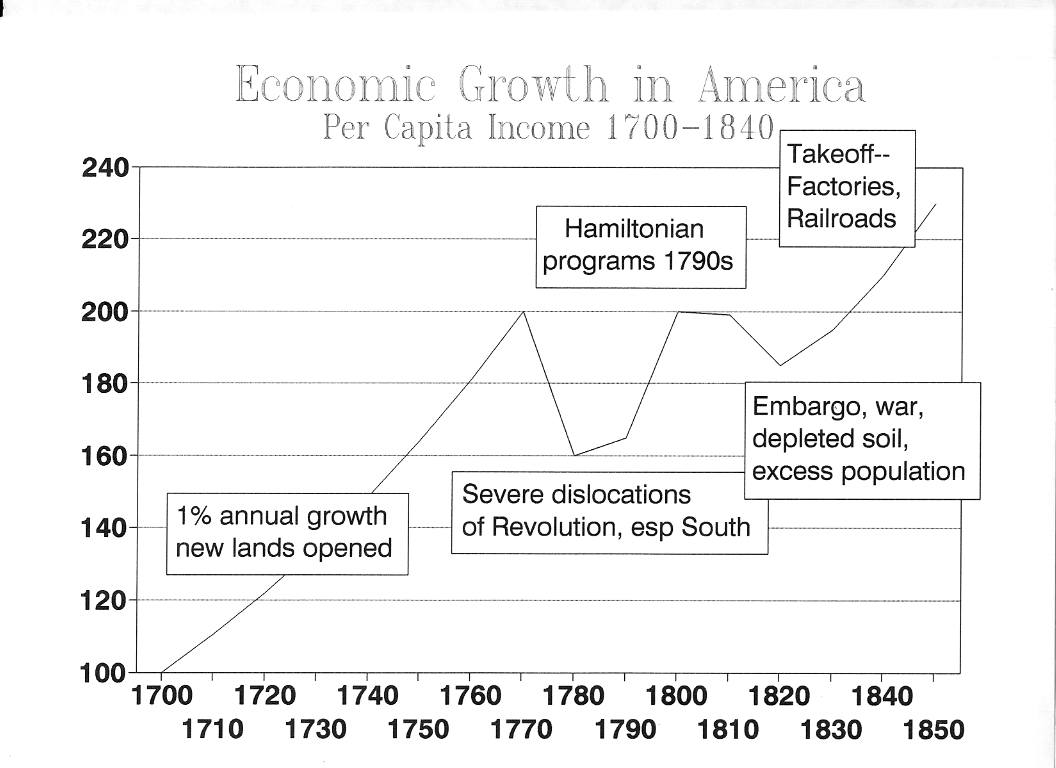
Long-term economic growth in the United States

A majority of New England residents were small farmers. A man had complete power over the property within these small farm families. When married, an English woman gave up her maiden name. The role of wives was to raise and nurture healthy children and support their husbands. Most women carried out these duties. During the 18th century, couples usually married between the ages of 20–24, and 6–8 children were typical of a family, with three on average surviving to adulthood. Farm women provided most of the materials needed by the rest of the family by spinning yarn from wool and knitting sweaters and stockings, making candles and soap from ashes, and churning milk into butter.

Most New England parents tried to help their sons establish farms of their own. When sons married, fathers gave them gifts of land, livestock, or farming equipment; daughters received household goods, farm animals, or cash. Arranged marriages were very unusual; normally, children chose their own spouses from within a circle of suitable acquaintances who shared their race, religion, and social standing. Parents retained veto power over their children's marriages.

By the middle of the 18th century, New England's population had grown dramatically, going from about 100,000 people in 1700 to 250,000 in 1725 and 375,000 in 1750 thanks to high birth rates and relatively high overall life expectancy. (A 15-year-old boy in 1700 could expect to live to about 63.) Colonists in Massachusetts, Connecticut, and Rhode Island continued to subdivide their land between farmers; the farms became too small to support single families, and this threatened the New England ideal of a society of independent yeoman farmers.

Some farmers obtained land grants to create farms in undeveloped land in Massachusetts and Connecticut or bought plots of land from speculators in New Hampshire in what later became Vermont. Other farmers became agricultural innovators. They planted nutritious English grass such as red clover and timothy-grass, which provided more feed for livestock, and potatoes, which provided a high production rate that was an advantage for small farms. Families increased their productivity by exchanging goods and labor with each other. They lent livestock and grazing land to one another and worked together to spin yarn, sew quilts, and shuck corn. Migration, agricultural innovation, and economic cooperation were creative measures that preserved New England's yeoman society until the 19th century.

==== Dwellings and material culture ====
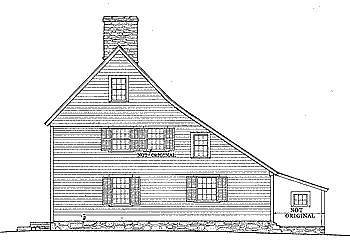
Saltbox-style homes originated in New England after 1650

New England farming families generally lived in wooden houses because of the abundance of trees. A typical New England farmhouse was one-and-a-half stories tall and had a strong frame (usually made of large square timbers) that was covered by wooden clapboard siding. A large chimney stood in the middle of the house that provided cooking facilities and warmth during the winter. One side of the ground floor contained a hall, a general-purpose room where the family worked and ate meals. Adjacent to the hall was the parlor, a room used to entertain guests that contained the family's best furnishings and the parents' bed. Children slept in a loft above, while the kitchen was either part of the hall or was located in a shed along the back of the house. Colonial families were large, and these small dwellings had much activity and there was little privacy.

The furniture of the time was very basic, common household items include a trestle table, benches and stools, while chairs were rare. Bedsteads were expensive which lead to their rarity, so most people slept on mats, which were rolled up when not in use. People kept items in simple-made chests. The wealthy had larger bound chests including locks and cabinets, cupboards and dressers. The latter were used to store cups and cooking utensils. Glass-made items were also rare. For drinking cups, leather jacks and bombards were common.

==== Town life ====
By the mid-18th century in New England, shipbuilding was a staple, particularly as the North American wilderness offered a seemingly endless supply of timber. The British crown often turned to the inexpensive yet strongly built American ships. There was a shipyard at the mouth of almost every river in New England.

By 1750, a variety of artisans, shopkeepers, and merchants provided services to the growing farming population. Blacksmiths, wheelwrights, and furniture makers set up shops in rural villages. There they built and repaired goods needed by farm families. Stores were set up by traders selling English manufactures such as cloth, iron utensils, and window glass, as well as West Indian products such as sugar and molasses. The storekeepers of these shops sold their imported goods in exchange for crops and other local products, including roof shingles, potash, and barrel staves. These local goods were shipped to towns and cities all along the Atlantic Coast. Enterprising men set up stables and taverns along wagon roads to serve this transportation system.

These products were delivered to port towns such as Boston and Salem in Massachusetts, New Haven in Connecticut, and Newport and Providence in Rhode Island. Merchants then exported them to the West Indies, where they were traded for molasses, sugar, gold coins, and bills of exchange, also known as credit slips. They carried the West Indian products to New England factories, where the raw sugar was turned into granulated sugar and the molasses distilled into rum. The gold and credit slips were sent to England where they were exchanged for manufactures, which were shipped back to the colonies and sold along with the sugar and rum to farmers.

Other New England merchants took advantage of the rich fishing areas along the Atlantic Coast and financed a large fishing fleet, transporting its catch of mackerel and cod to the West Indies and Europe. Some merchants exploited the vast amounts of timber along the coasts and rivers of northern New England. They funded sawmills that supplied cheap wood for houses and shipbuilding. Hundreds of New England shipwrights built oceangoing ships, which they sold to British and American merchants.

Many merchants became very wealthy by providing their goods to the agricultural population, and ended up dominating the society of sea port cities. Unlike yeoman farmhouses, these merchants lived in elegant 2 1/2-story houses designed in the new Georgian style, imitating the lifestyle of the upper class of England. These Georgian houses had symmetrical façades with equal numbers of windows on both sides of the central door. The interior consisted of a passageway down the middle of the house with specialized rooms off the sides, such as a library, dining room, formal parlor, and master bedroom. Unlike the multi-purpose space of the yeoman houses, each of these rooms served a separate purpose. These houses contained bedrooms on the second floor that provided privacy to parents and children.

==== Culture and education ====
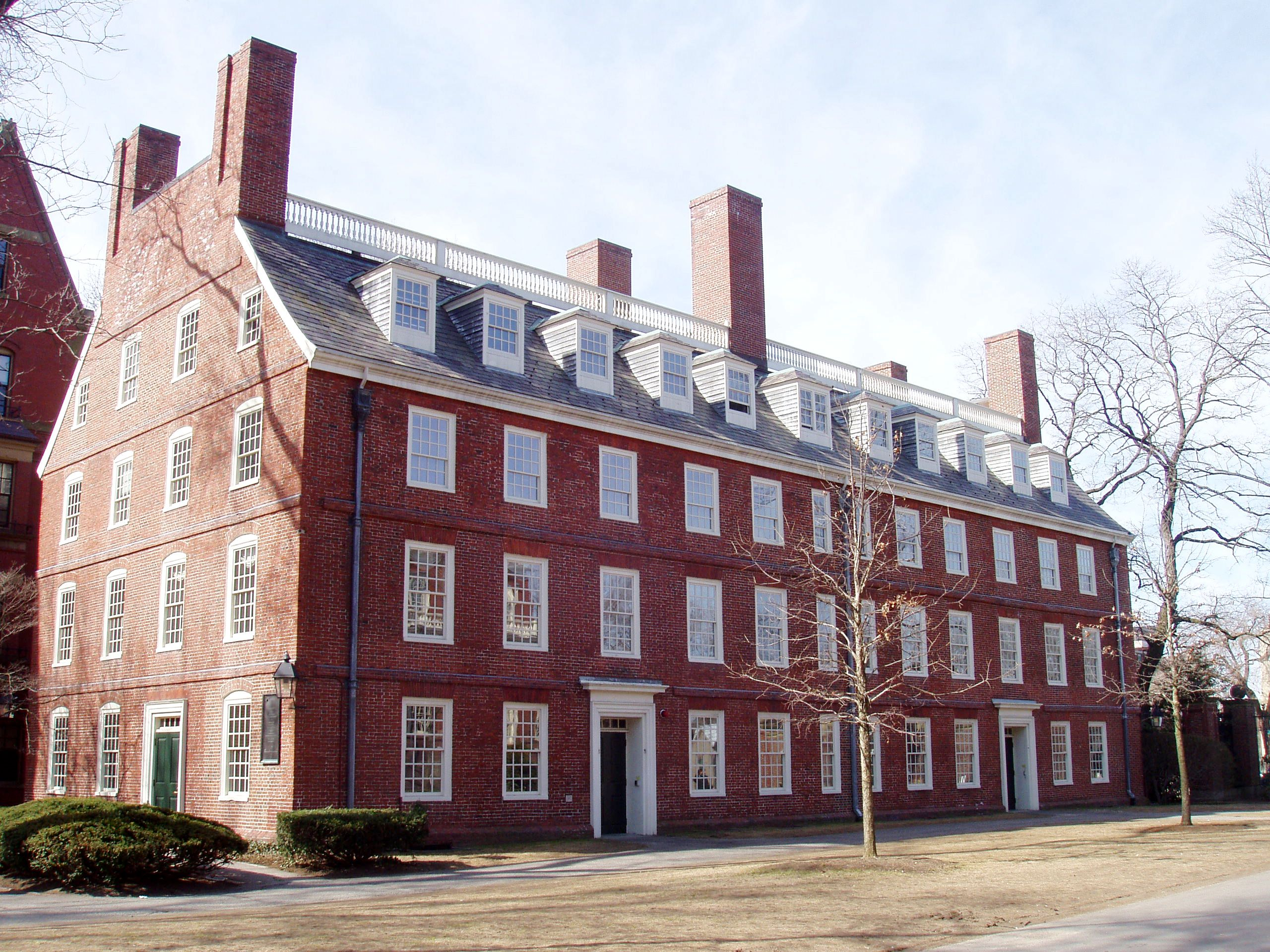
Massachusetts Hall, built between 1718 and 1720, the oldest building at Harvard University, the first U.S. university, founded in 1636

Education was primarily the responsibility of families, but numerous religious groups established tax-supported elementary schools, especially the Puritans in New England, so that their children could read the Bible. Nearly all the religious denominations set up their own schools and colleges to train ministers. Each city and most towns had private academies for the children of affluent families.

The practical sciences were of great interest to colonial Americans, who were engaged in the process of taming and settling a wild frontier country. The mainstream of intellectual activity in the colonies was on technological and engineering developments rather than more abstract topics such as politics or metaphysics. American scientific activity was pursued by such people as:

- David Rittenhouse, who constructed the first planetarium in the Western Hemisphere
- New York lieutenant governor Cadwallader Colden, botanist and anthropologist
- Benjamin Rush, physician, social reformer, and member of the American Philosophical Society
- Benjamin Franklin, founder of the American Philosophical Society who contributed important discoveries to physics such as electricity, but was more successful in his practical inventions, including stoves and lightning rods

The arts in colonial America were not as successful as the sciences. Literature in the European sense was nearly nonexistent, with histories being far more noteworthy. These included The History and present State of Virginia (1705) by Robert Beverly and History of the Dividing Line (1728–29) by William Byrd, which was not published until a century later. Instead, the newspaper was the principal form of reading material. Printing was expensive, and most publications focused on purely practical matters, such as major news, advertisements, and business reports. Almanacs were very popular, also, Benjamin Franklin's Poor Richard's Almanack being the most famous. Literary magazines appeared at mid-century, but few were profitable and most went out of business after only a few years. American publications never approached the intellectual quality of European writers, but they were much more widespread and achieved a greater readership than anything produced by Voltaire, Locke, or Rousseau.

New Englanders wrote journals, pamphlets, books, and especially sermons, which exceeded those written by all other colonies combined. Boston minister Cotton Mather published Magnalia Christi Americana (The Great Works of Christ in America, 1702), and revivalist Jonathan Edwards wrote his philosophical work A Careful and Strict Enquiry Into...Notions of...Freedom of Will... (1754). Most music had a religious theme, as well, and was mainly the singing of Psalms. Because of New England's deep religious beliefs, artistic works that were insufficiently religious or too "worldly" were banned, especially the theater. The leading theologian and philosopher of the colonial era was Jonathan Edwards of Massachusetts, an interpreter of Calvinism and the leader of the First Great Awakening.

Art and drama were somewhat more successful than literature. Benjamin West was a noteworthy painter of historical subjects, and two first-rate portrait painters emerged in John Copley and Gilbert Stuart, yet all three men spent much of their lives in London. Theater was more developed in the Southern colonies, especially South Carolina, but nowhere did stage works attain the level of Europe. Puritans in New England and Quakers in Pennsylvania opposed theatrical performances as immoral and ungodly.

Elementary education was widespread in New England. Early Puritan settlers believed that it was necessary to study the Bible, so children were taught to read at an early age. It was also required that each town pay for a primary school. About 10 percent enjoyed secondary schooling and funded grammar schools in larger towns. Most boys learned skills from their fathers on the farm or as apprentices to artisans. Few girls attended formal schools, but most were able to get some education at home or at so-called "Dame schools" where women taught basic reading and writing skills in their own houses. By 1750, nearly 90% of New England's women and almost all of its men could read and write.

Puritans founded Harvard College in Cambridge, Massachusetts in 1636 and, later, Yale College in New Haven, Connecticut in 1701. Later, Baptists founded Rhode Island College, which is now Brown University, in Providence, Rhode Island in 1764 and Congregationalists established Dartmouth College in Hanover, New Hampshire in 1769. Virginia founded the College of William and Mary in 1693; it was primarily Anglican. The colleges were designed for aspiring ministers, lawyers, or doctors. Every student shared the same curriculum, which focused on Latin and Greek, mathematics, and history, philosophy, logic, ethics, rhetoric, oratory, and a little basic science. There were no separate seminaries, law schools, or divinity schools. The first medical schools were founded late in the colonial era in Philadelphia and New York.

=== Delaware Valley and Mid-Atlantic region ===
Unlike New England, the Mid-Atlantic region gained much of its population from new immigration and, by 1750, the combined populations of New York, New Jersey, and Pennsylvania had reached nearly 300,000 people. By 1750, about 60,000 Irish and 50,000 Germans came to live in British North America, many of them settling in the Mid-Atlantic region. William Penn founded the colony of Pennsylvania in 1682, and attracted an influx of British Quakers with his policies of religious liberty and freehold ownership. The first major influx of settlers were the Scotch Irish, who headed to the frontier. Many Germans came to escape the religious conflicts and declining economic opportunities in Germany and Switzerland.

Thousands of poor German farmers, chiefly from the Palatine region in Germany, migrated to upstate districts after 1700. They largely kept to themselves, married their own, spoke German, attended Lutheran churches, and retained their own customs and foods. They emphasized farm ownership. Some mastered English to become conversant with local legal and business opportunities. They ignored the indigenous peoples and tolerated slavery, although few were rich enough to own a slave.

==== Ways of life ====
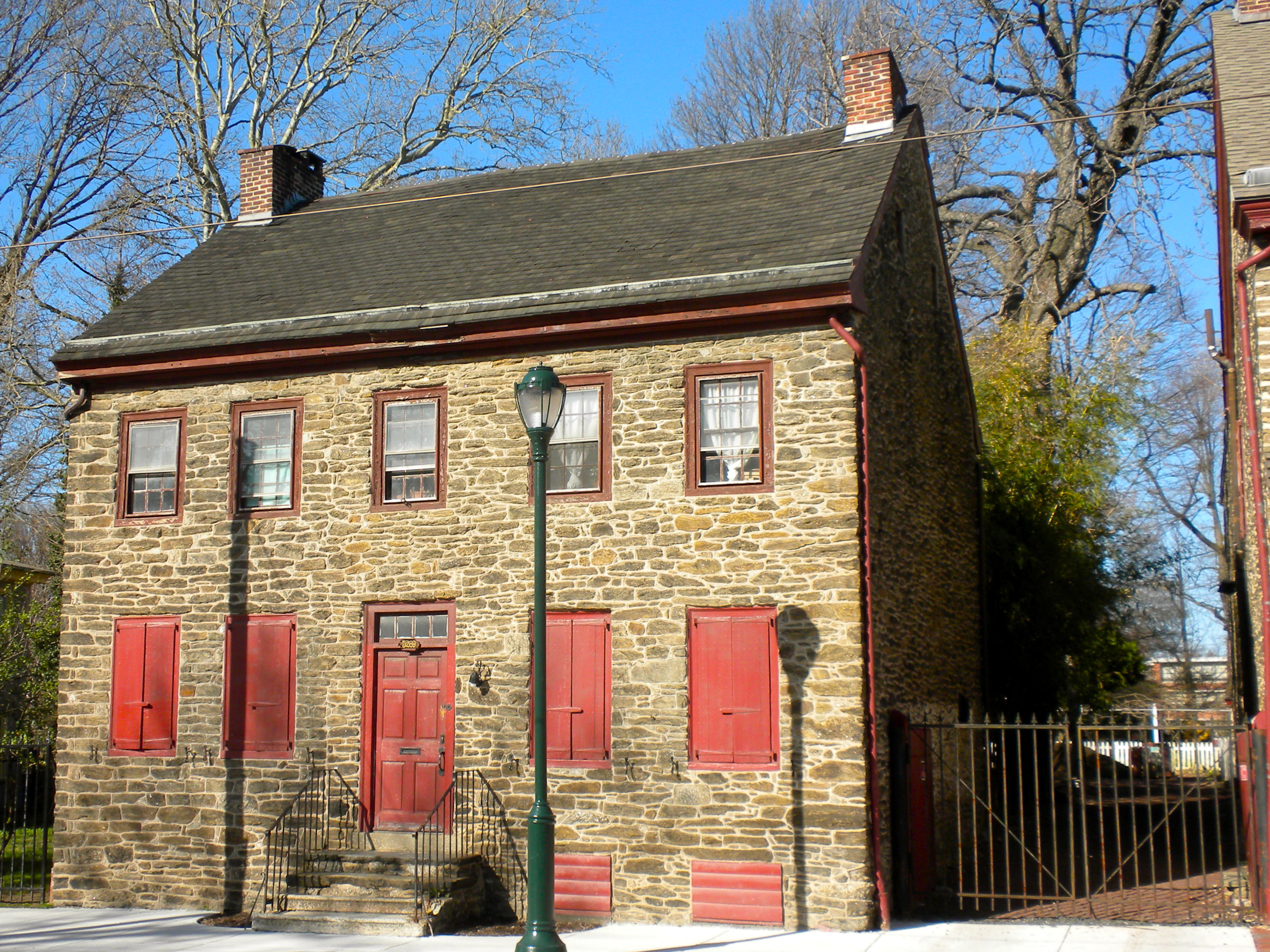
Grumblethorpe Tenant House in the Germantown section of Philadelphia, where 80 percent of the buildings were made entirely of stone

Much of the architecture of the Middle Colonies reflects the diversity of its people. In Albany and New York City, a majority of the buildings were Dutch style with brick exteriors and high gables at each end, while many Dutch churches were octagonal. German and Welsh settlers in Pennsylvania used cut stone to build their houses, following the way of their homeland and completely ignoring the plethora of timber in the area. An example of this would be Germantown, Pennsylvania where 80 percent of the buildings in the town were made entirely of stone. On the other hand, settlers from Ireland took advantage of America's ample supply of timber and constructed sturdy log cabins.

Ethnic cultures also affected styles of furniture. Rural Quakers preferred simple designs in furnishings such as tables, chairs, and chests, and shunned elaborate decorations. However, some urban Quakers had much more elaborate furniture. The city of Philadelphia became a major center of furniture-making because of its massive wealth from Quaker and British merchants. Philadelphian cabinet makers built elegant desks and highboys. German artisans created intricately carved designs on their chests and other furniture, with painted scenes of flowers and birds. German potters also crafted a large array of jugs, pots, and plates of both elegant and traditional design.

By the time of the Revolutionary War, approximately 85 percent of white Americans were of English, Irish, Welsh, or Scottish descent. Approximately 8.8 percent of whites were of German ancestry, and 3.5 percent were of Dutch origin.

==== Farming ====
Ethnicity made a difference in agricultural practice. This can be seen where German farmers generally preferred oxen rather than horses to pull their plows, while Scots-Irish established a farming economy based on hogs and corn. Eventually, cows were brought with the horses. Almost all the farms had cows on their land. In Ireland, people farmed intensively, working small pieces of land trying to get the largest possible production rate from their crops. In the American colonies, settlers from Northern Ireland focused on mixed farming. Using this technique, they grew corn for human consumption and as feed for hogs and other livestock. Many improvement-minded farmers of all different backgrounds began using new agricultural practices to raise their output. During the 1750s, these agricultural innovators replaced the hand sickles and scythes used to harvest hay, wheat, and barley with the cradle scythe, a tool with wooden fingers that arranged the stalks of grain for easy collection. This tool was able to triple the amount of work done by farmers in one day. Farmers also began fertilizing their fields with dung and lime and rotating their crops to keep the soil fertile. By 1700, Philadelphia was exporting 350,000 bushels of wheat and 18,000 tons of flour annually. The Southern colonies in particular relied on cash crops such as tobacco and cotton. South Carolina produced rice and indigo. North Carolina was somewhat less involved in the plantation economy, but because a major producer of naval stores. Virginia and Maryland came to be almost totally dependent on tobacco, which would ultimately prove fatal at the end of the 18th century thanks to exhausted soil and collapsing prices, but for most of the century, the soil remained good and a single-crop economy profitable.

Before 1720, most colonists in the mid-Atlantic region worked with small-scale farming and paid for imported manufactures by supplying the West Indies with corn and flour. In New York, a fur-pelt export trade to Europe flourished adding additional wealth to the region. After 1720, mid-Atlantic farming stimulated with the international demand for wheat. A massive population explosion in Europe brought wheat prices up. By 1770, a bushel of wheat cost twice as much as it did in 1720. Farmers also expanded their production of flax seed and corn since flax was a high demand in the Irish linen industry and a demand for corn existed in the West Indies. Thus, by mid-century, most colonial farming was a commercial venture, although subsistence agriculture continued to exist in New England and the middle colonies. Some immigrants who just arrived purchased farms and shared in this export wealth, but many poor German and Irish immigrants were forced to work as agricultural wage laborers. Merchants and artisans also hired these homeless workers for a domestic system for the manufacture of cloth and other goods. Merchants often bought wool and flax from farmers and employed newly arrived immigrants, who had been textile workers in Ireland and Germany, to work in their homes spinning the materials into yarn and cloth. Large farmers and merchants became wealthy, while farmers with smaller farms and artisans only made enough for subsistence. The Mid-Atlantic region, by 1750, was divided by both ethnic background and wealth.

==== Seaports ====
Seaports that expanded from the wheat trade had more social classes than anywhere else in the Middle Colonies. By 1773, the population of the three largest cities had grown: Philadelphia reached 40,000, New York City reached 25,000, and Baltimore reached 6,000. Merchants dominated seaport society, and about 40 merchants controlled half of Philadelphia's trade. Wealthy merchants in Philadelphia and New York, like their counterparts in New England, built elegant Georgian-style mansions such as those in Fairmount Park.

Shopkeepers, artisans, shipwrights, butchers, coopers, seamstresses, cobblers, bakers, carpenters, masons, and many other specialized crafts made up the middle class of seaport society. Wives and husbands often worked as a team and taught their children their skills to pass it on through the family. Many of these artisans and traders made enough money to create a modest life. Laborers stood at the bottom of seaport society. These poor people worked on the docks unloading inbound vessels and loading outbound vessels with wheat, corn, and flax seed. Many of these were African American; some were free, while others were enslaved. In 1750, blacks made up about 10 percent of the population of New York and Philadelphia. Hundreds of seamen worked as sailors on merchant ships, some of whom were African American.

=== Southern Colonies ===
The Southern Colonies were mainly dominated by the wealthy planters in Maryland, Virginia, and South Carolina. They owned increasingly large plantations that were worked by African slaves. Of the 650,000 inhabitants of the South in 1750, about 250,000 or 40 percent, were slaves. The plantations grew tobacco, indigo and rice for export, and raised most of their own food supplies. In addition, many small subsistence farms were family owned and operated by yeoman. Most white men owned some land, and therefore could vote.

==== Women in the South ====
Historians have paid special attention to the role of women, family, and gender in the colonial South since the social history revolution in the 1970s.

Very few women were present in the early Chesapeake colonies. In 1650, estimates put Maryland's total population near 600 with fewer than 200 women present. Much of the population consisted of young, single, white indentured servants and, as such, the colonies lacked social cohesiveness, to a large degree. African women entered the colony as early as 1619, although their status remains a historical debate—free, slave, or indentured servant.

In the 17th century, high mortality rates for newcomers and a very high ratio of men to women made family life either impossible or unstable for most colonists. These factors made families and communities fundamentally different from their counterparts in Europe and New England in the Virginia-Maryland region before 1700, along with dispersed settlements and a reluctance to live in villages, together with a growing immigration of white indentured servants and black slaves. These extreme conditions both demeaned and empowered women.

Women were often vulnerable to exploitation and abuse, especially teenage girls who were indentured servants and lacking male protectors. On the other hand, young women had much more freedom in choosing spouses, without parental oversight, and the shortage of eligible women enabled them to use marriage as an avenue to upward mobility. The high death rates meant that Chesapeake wives generally became widows who inherited property; many widows increased their property by remarrying as soon as possible. The population began to stabilize around 1700, with a 1704 census listing 30,437 white people present with 7,163 of those being women. Women married younger, remained wed longer, bore more children, and lost influence within the family polity.

== See also ==
- British North America
- Chronology of the colonization of North America
- Colonial American military history
- Credit in the Thirteen Colonies
- Cuisine of the Thirteen Colonies
- Disease in colonial America
- Early American publishers and printers
- European colonization of the Americas
- Indigenous peoples of the Americas
- List of incidents of civil unrest in Colonial North America
- List of North American settlements by year of foundation
- Political culture of the United States
- Slavery in the colonial United States
- Thirteen Colonies
- United Colonies, the name for the emerging nation, 1775–1776, before independence
