= Provincial Congress =

Colonial legislatures during the American Revolution

A provincial congress was an extralegal general convention or representative assembly patterned after colonial lower houses formed in ten of the thirteen Colonies during the American Revolution to initiate self-rule. Some were referred to as provincial congresses while others used different terms. The provincial congresses were generally replaced or renamed when the ten British colonies declared themselves sovereign states.

== Overview ==
Colonial government in America was a system of governance modeled after the British government of the time, with the king corresponding to the governor, the House of Commons to the colonial assembly, and the House of Lords to the governor's council. Colonial assemblies, based on their rights as Englishmen, did not accept that the British Parliament in which they had no representatives had authority over them to impose taxes (or certain other laws), and that it was the colonial assembly’s duty to decide what should be imposed on their fellow colonists (the Massachusetts Circular Letter was an example of that argument). Legally, the crown governor's authority was unassailable, but assemblies began to resist efforts by some governors and royal officials to enforce acts of Parliament or to raise local taxes that governors demanded. In resisting that authority, assemblies increasingly depended on arguments based upon natural rights and the common welfare, giving life to the notion that governments derived, or ought to derive, their authority from the consent of the governed.

Committees of correspondence were formed as shadow governments in the Thirteen colonies during the American Revolution. During the First Continental Congress (in 1774), committees of inspection were formed to enforce the Continental Association trade boycott with Britain in response to the British Parliament’s Intolerable Acts. By 1775, the committees had become counter-governments that gradually replaced royal authority and took control of local governments. Known as the Committees of Safety, they regulated the economy, politics, morality, and militia of their individual communities. After the British Proclamation of Rebellion and the King’s speech before Parliament (27 October 1775) the colonies moved towards independence.

Provisional governments began to create new state constitutions and governments. Committees of safety were a later outcome of the committees of correspondence. Committees of safety were executive bodies that governed during adjournments of, were created by, and derived their authority from provincial assemblies or congresses.

In some colonies there were little or no changes to their assemblies until statehood. They had no need of a provisional legislative body since their governors did not dissolve or prevent the legislative assemblies from meeting. This was the case in the Charter colonies with more autonomy, such as Connecticut and Rhode Island, which elected colonial governors who were aligned with their assemblies. (Connecticut Governor Jonathan Trumbull and Rhode Island Governor Nicholas Cooke served as both the last colonial governors and first state governors.) The Delaware Colony was a proprietary colony under Governor John Penn of the Province of Pennsylvania, which included the “Lower Counties of the Delaware", but it maintained a separate Delaware assembly. It was generally allowed more independence of action in their colonial assembly than in other colonies.

== List of provincial congresses and bodies ==
- Maryland Provincial Convention
- Massachusetts Provincial Congress
- New York Provincial Congress
- Provincial Congress of Georgia
- Provincial Congress of New Jersey
- North Carolina Provincial Congress
- South Carolina Provincial Congress
- Pennsylvania Provincial Conference
- New Hampshire Provincial Congress

== See also ==
- Colonial government in the Thirteen Colonies
- Continental Congress
