= Colonial government in the Thirteen Colonies =

Government in British America

The Thirteen Colonies (shown in red) in 1775

The governments of the Thirteen Colonies of British America developed in the 17th and 18th centuries under the influence of the British constitution. The British monarch issued colonial charters that established either royal colonies, proprietary colonies, or corporate colonies. In every colony, a governor led the executive branch, and the legislative branch was divided into two houses: a governor's council and a representative assembly. Men who met property qualifications elected the assembly. In royal colonies, the British government appointed the governor and the council. In proprietary colonies, the proprietors appointed the governor and his council. In corporate colonies, voters elected these officials. By the mid-1700s most colonies were royal colonies, a few were still proprietary or corporate.

In domestic matters, the colonies were largely self-governing on many issues; however, the British government did exercise veto power over colonial legislation, and regardless of the type of colonial government, retained control of the law and equity courts; judges were selected by the British government and served at the king's pleasure. Diplomatic affairs were handled by the British government, as were trade policies and wars with foreign powers (wars with Native Americans were generally handled by colonial governments).

The American Revolution (1775–1783) was a dispute over the British Parliament's right to enact domestic legislation for the American colonies. The British government's position was that Parliament's authority was unlimited, while the American position was that colonial legislatures were coequal with Parliament and outside of its jurisdiction. As the revolution progressed, the colonial governments were replaced by temporary provincial congresses and ultimately by state constitutions establishing republican governments. The colonial experience informed and shaped the new state constitutions and, ultimately, the United States Constitution adopted in 1789.

== Imperial government ==
=== British constitution ===
After the Glorious Revolution of 1688, Great Britain was governed as a constitutional monarchy with sovereignty residing in the King-in-Parliament. Parliament was a bicameral legislature. Aristocrats inherited seats in the House of Lords, while the gentry and merchants elected the House of Commons. The British monarch possessed executive authority, but he relied on the cabinet ministers of the Privy Council to actually run the government. These ministers depended on majority support in both houses of Parliament to govern effectively. While only 25 percent of adult men met the property qualifications to vote in parliamentary elections, historian Alan Taylor notes:

the English constitution was extraordinarily open and libertarian when compared with the absolute monarchies then developing in the rest of Europe. Consequently, it mattered greatly to the later political culture of the United States that England, rather than Spain or France, eventually dominated colonization north of Florida.

By the start of the American Revolution, the thirteen colonies had developed political systems featuring a governor exercising executive power and a bicameral legislature made up of a council and an assembly. The system was modeled on the British constitution, with the governor corresponding to the monarch, the council to the House of Lords and the assembly to the House of Commons. The American colonists were proud of their status as British subjects and claimed the same rights of Englishmen as their counterparts in the mother country.

=== Crown ===
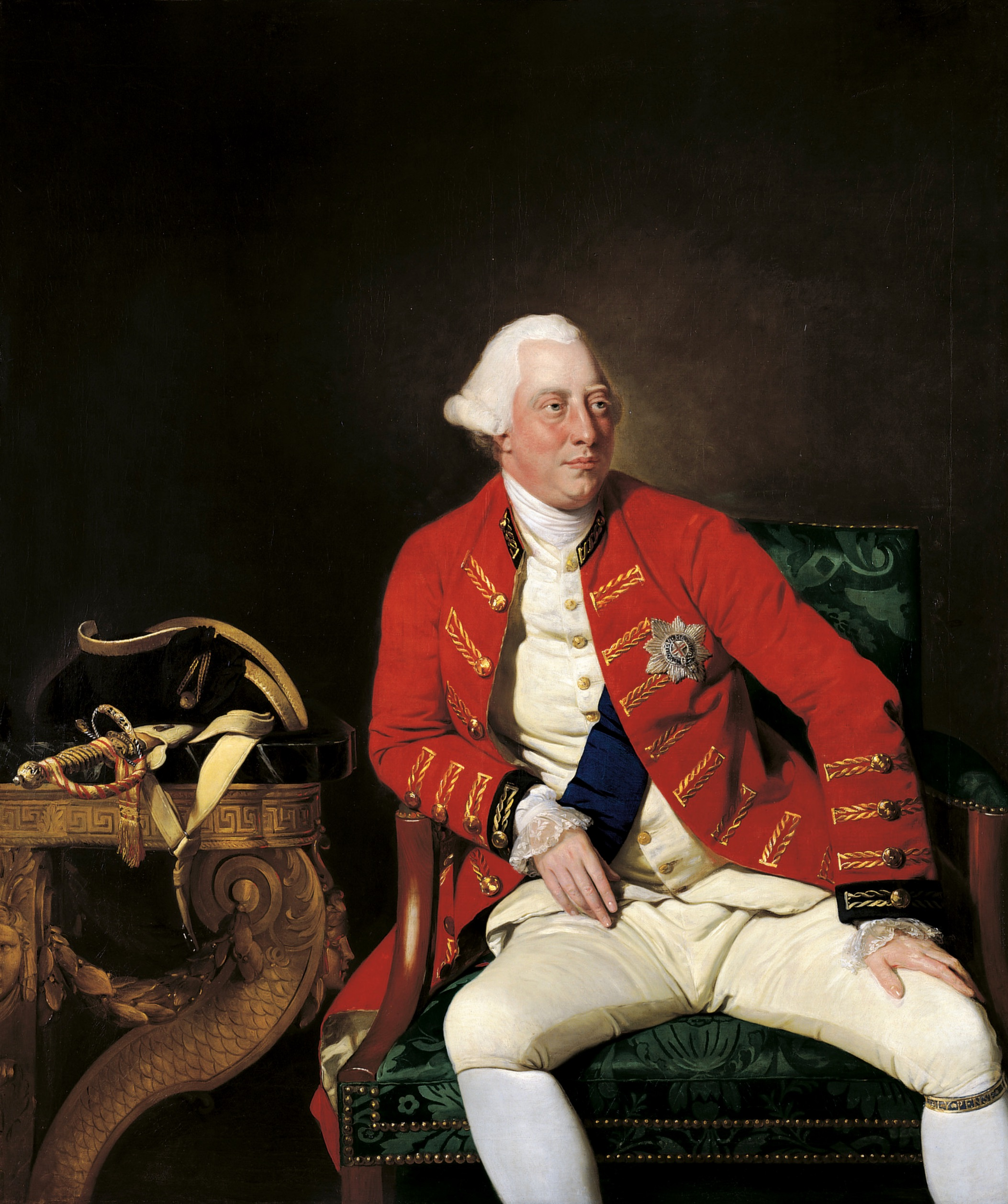
George III, King of Great Britain and Ireland during the American Revolution, was the last monarch to reign over the Thirteen Colonies

The Thirteen Colonies were all founded with royal authorization, and authority continued to flow from the monarch as colonial governments exercised authority in the king's name. They were part of what was then British America in the Kingdom of Great Britain.

A colony's precise relationship to the Crown depended on whether it was a corporate colony, proprietary colony or royal colony as defined in its colonial charter. Whereas royal colonies belonged to the Crown, proprietary and corporate colonies were granted by the Crown to private interests.

Historian Robert Middlekauff describes royal administration of the colonies as inadequate and inefficient because lines of authority were never entirely clear. Before 1768, responsibility for colonial affairs rested with the Privy Council and the Secretary of State for the Southern Department. The Secretary relied on the Board of Trade to supply him with information and pass on his instructions to colonial officials. After 1768, the Secretary of State for Colonial Affairs was responsible for supervising the colonies; however, this ministry suffered from ineffective secretaries and the jealousy of other government ministers.

=== Parliament ===
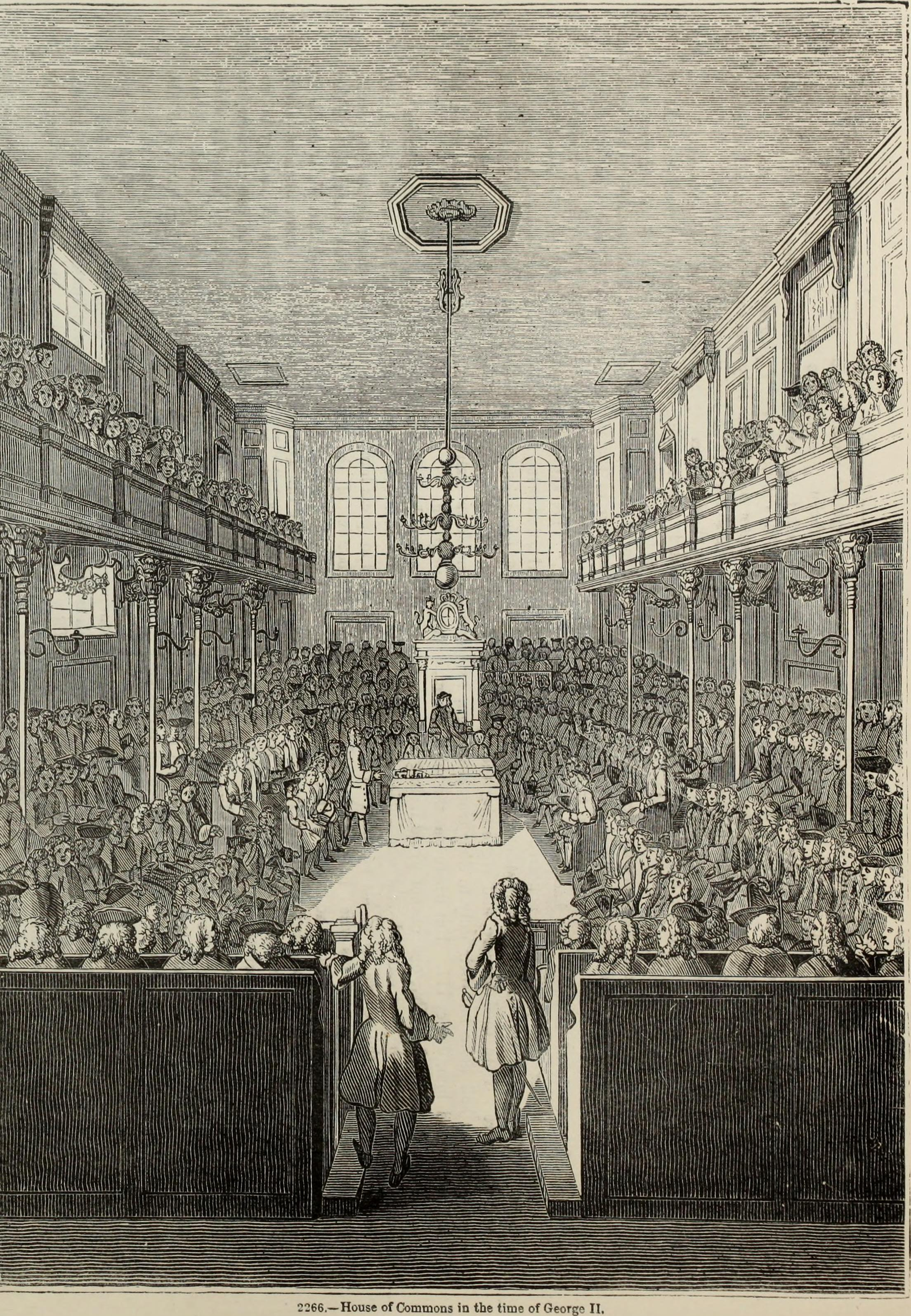
The House of Commons of Great Britain during the reign of George II

Parliament's authority over the colonies was unclear and controversial in the 18th century. As English government evolved from government by the Crown toward government in the name of the Crown (the King-in-Parliament), the convention that the colonies were ruled solely by the monarch gave way to greater involvement of Parliament by the mid 1700s. Acts of Parliament regulated commerce, defined citizenship, and limited the printing of colonial paper money.

The British government argued that Parliament's authority to legislate for the colonies was unlimited. This was stated explicitly in the Declaratory Act 1766. The British also argued that the colonists, while not actually represented in Parliament, were nonetheless virtually represented.

The American view, shaped by Whig political philosophy, was that Parliament's authority over the colonies was limited. For the Americans, legislation was different from taxation. While the colonies initially recognized Parliament's right to legislate for the whole British Empire—such as on matters of trade—they argued that parliamentary taxation was a violation of the principle of taxation by consent since consent could only be granted by the colonists' own representatives. Later, Americans argued that the colonies were outside of Parliament's jurisdiction and that the colonists owed allegiance only to the Crown. In effect, Americans argued that their colonial legislatures were coequal—not subordinate—to Parliament. These incompatible interpretations of the British constitution would become the central issue of the American Revolution.

=== Judicial appeals ===
The Privy Council (technically, the King-in-Council) exercised appellate jurisdiction over the colonies. Appellate jurisdiction was delegated to the Board of Trade in 1678 and transferred to the Privy Council Appeals Committee in 1697.

The Appeals Committee was severely flawed because its membership was actually a committee of the whole of the Privy Council, of whom a quorum was three. Even worse, many Privy Councillors were not lawyers, all Privy Councillors had equal voting power on appeals, and there was no requirement that any of the Privy Councillors hearing a particular appeal had to be a lawyer. As a result, parties to appeals could and did try to tilt the outcome of appeals in their favor by persuading nonlawyer Privy Councillors to show up for the hearings on their appeals. For this reason, the Appeals Committee fell into disrepute among better-informed lawyers and judges in the colonies.

== Provincial government ==
=== Charter ===
Control over a corporate colony was granted to a joint-stock company, such as the Virginia Company. Virginia, Massachusetts, Connecticut and Rhode Island were founded as corporate colonies. New England's corporate colonies were virtually independent of royal authority and operated as republics where property owners elected the governor and legislators.

Proprietary colonies were owned and governed by individuals known as proprietors. To attract settlers, however, proprietors agreed to share power with property owners. Maryland, South Carolina, North Carolina, New York, New Jersey, and Pennsylvania were founded as proprietary colonies.

In 1624, Virginia became the first royal colony when the bankrupt Virginia Company's charter was revoked. Over time, more colonies transitioned to royal control. When the Revolution started, there were eight royal colonies and five non-royal. Maryland, Pennsylvania and Delaware remained proprietary, while Rhode Island and Connecticut continued as corporate colonies.

=== Governor ===
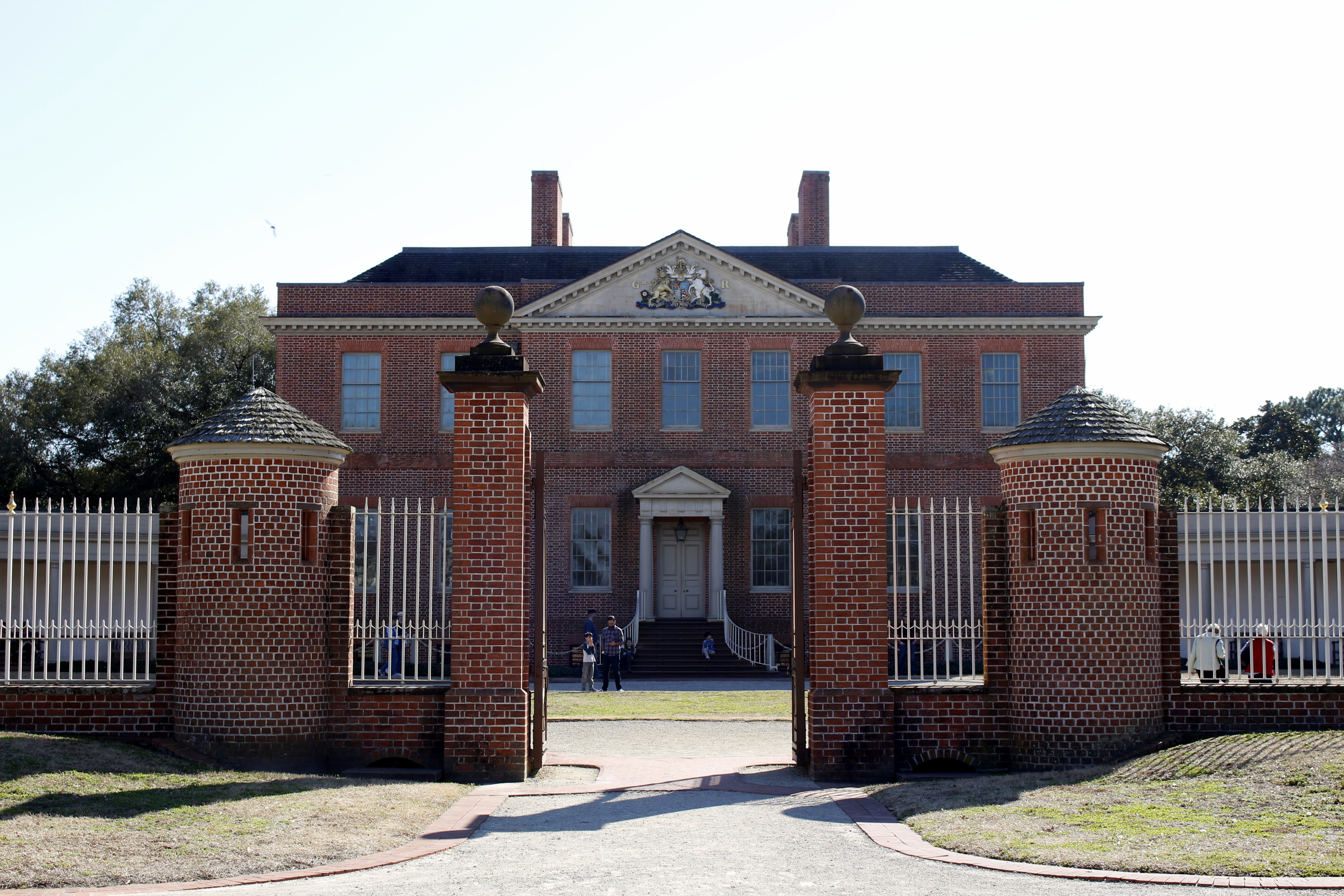
Governor's Palace at New Bern, North Carolina

In royal colonies, governors were appointed by the Crown and represented its interests. Before 1689, governors were the dominant political figures in the colonies. They possessed royal authority transmitted through their commissions and instructions. Among their powers included the right to summon, prorogue and dissolve the elected assembly. Governors could also veto any bill proposed by the colonial legislature.

Gradually, the assemblies successfully restricted the power of governors by gaining control over money bills, including the salaries of the governor and other officials. Therefore, a governor could find his salary withheld by an uncooperative legislature. Governors were often placed in an untenable position. Their official instructions from London demanded that they protect the Crown's power—the royal prerogative—from usurpation by the assembly; at the same time, they were also ordered to secure more colonial funding for Britain's wars against France. In return for military funding, the assemblies often demanded more power.

To gain support for his agenda, the governor distributed patronage. He could reward supporters by appointing them to various offices such as attorney general, surveyor-general or as a local sheriff. These offices were sought after as sources of prestige and income. He could also reward supporters with land grants. As a result of this strategy, colonial politics was characterized by a split between a governor's faction (the court party) and his opposition (the country party).

=== Governor's Council ===
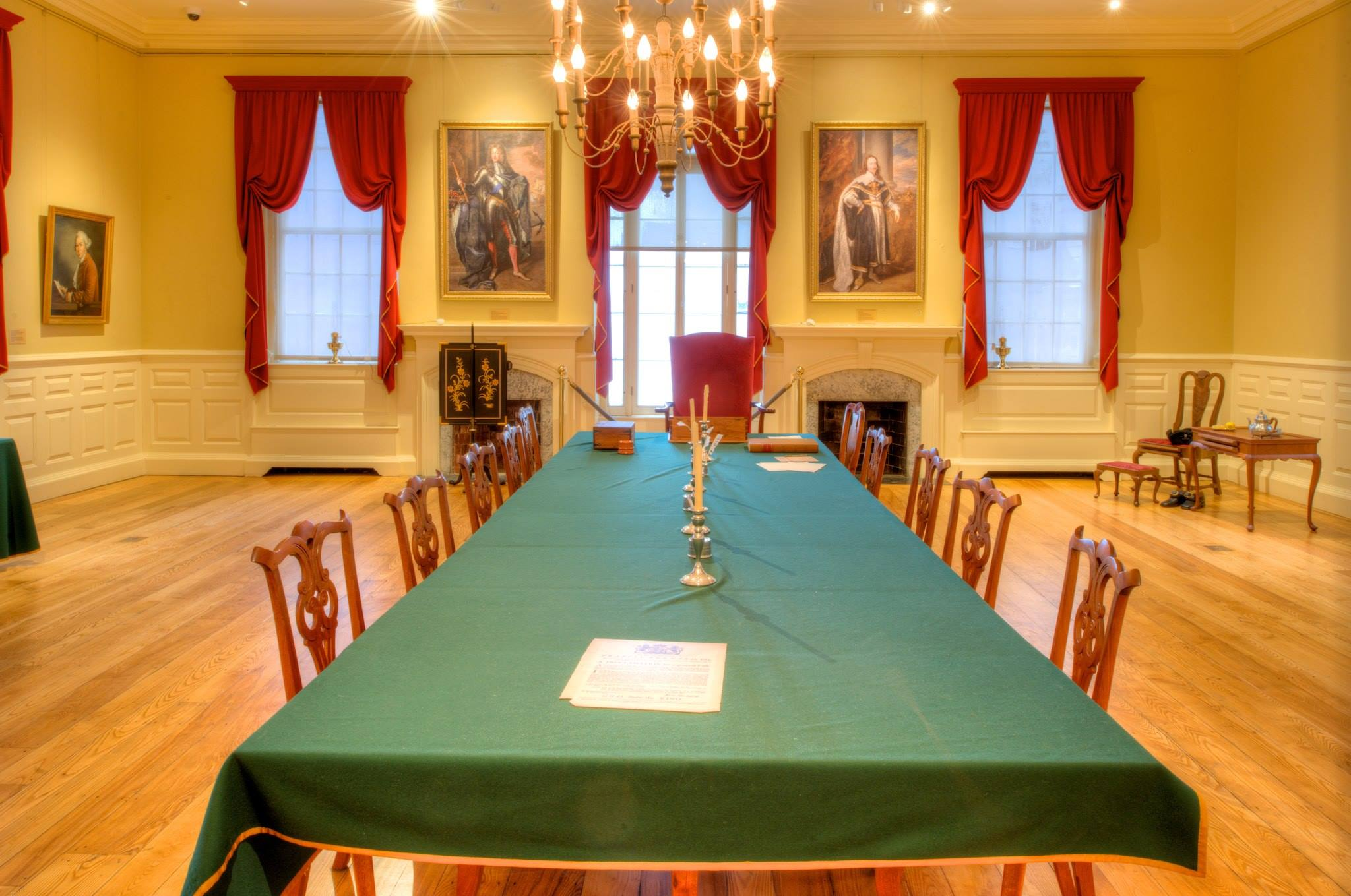
Council Chamber of the Royal Governor, Old Statehouse, in Boston

The executive branch included an advisory council to the governor that varied in size ranging from ten to thirty members. In royal colonies, the Crown appointed a mix of placemen (paid officeholders in the government) and members of the upper class within colonial society. Councilors tended to represent the interests of businessmen, creditors and property owners in general. While lawyers were prominent throughout the thirteen colonies, merchants were important in the northern colonies, and planters were more involved in the southern provinces. Members served "at pleasure" rather than for life or fixed terms. When there was an absentee governor or an interval between governors, the council acted as the government.

The governor's council also functioned as the upper house of the colonial legislature. In most colonies, the council could introduce bills, pass resolutions, and consider and act upon petitions. In some colonies, the council acted primarily as a chamber of revision, reviewing and improving legislation. At times, it would argue with the assembly over the amendment of money bills or other legislation.

In addition to being both an executive and legislative body, the council also had judicial authority. It was the final court of appeal within the colony. The council's multifaceted roles exposed it to criticism. Richard Henry Lee criticized Virginia's colonial government for lacking the balance and separation of powers found in the British constitution due to the council's lack of independence from the Crown.

=== Assembly ===
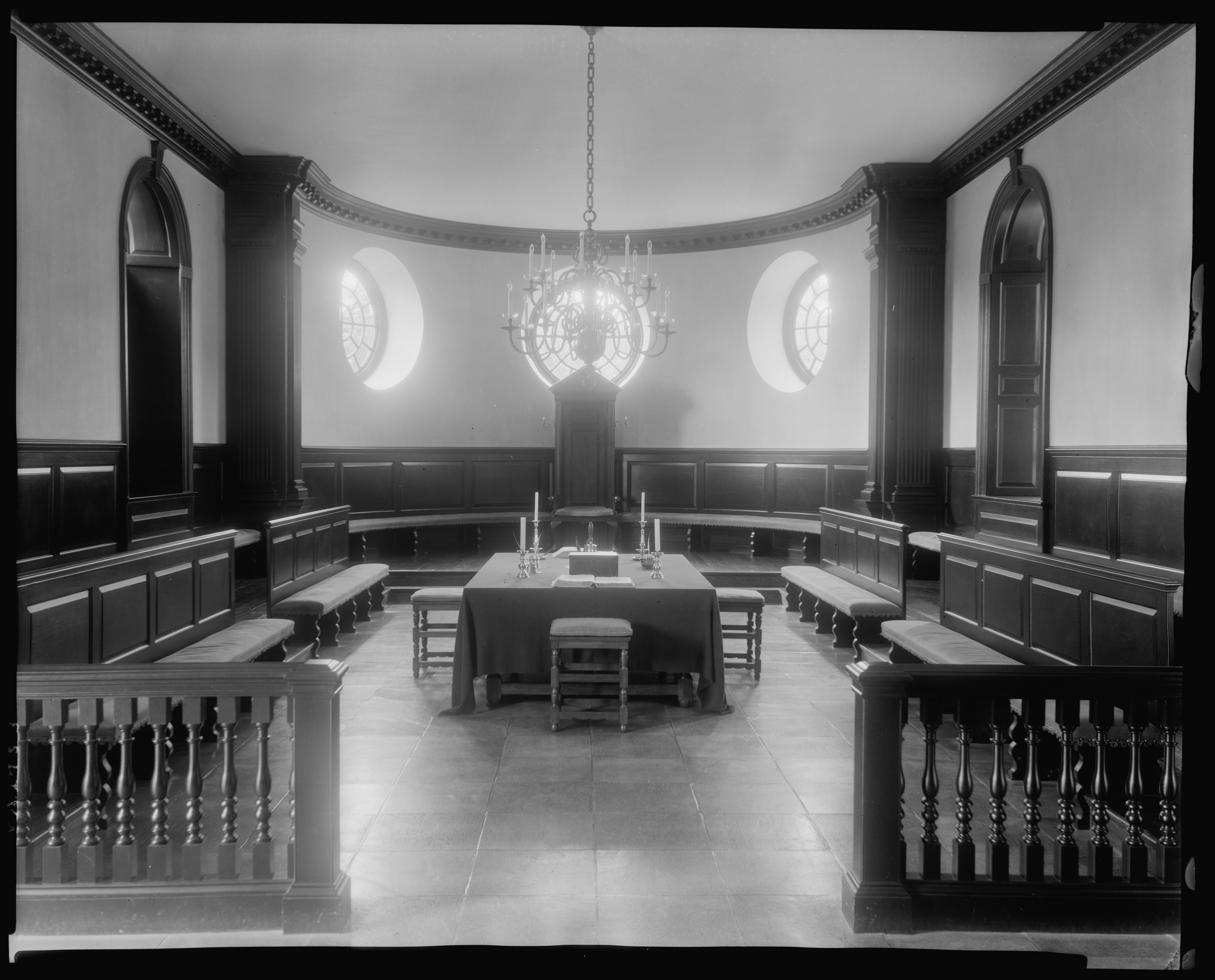
The chamber of the House of Burgesses inside the Capitol building at Colonial Williamsburg

The lower house of a colonial legislature was a representative assembly. These assemblies were called by different names. Connecticut variously used the terms General Corte, General Court, and General Assembly; Virginia had a House of Burgesses; Massachusetts had a House of Deputies; New York had a General Assembly; and both South Carolina and Georgia had a Commons House of Assembly. While names differed, the assemblies had several features in common. Members were elected annually by the propertied citizens of the towns or counties. Usually they met for a single, short session; but the council or governor could call a special session.

As in Britain, the right to vote was limited to men with freehold "landed property sufficient to ensure that they were personally independent and had a vested interest in the welfare of their communities". Due to the greater availability of land, the right to vote was more widespread in the colonies where by one estimate around 60 percent of adult white males could vote. In England and Wales, only 17–20 percent of adult males were eligible. Six colonies allowed alternatives to freehold ownership (such as personal property or tax payment) that extended voting rights to owners of urban property and even prosperous farmers who rented their land. Groups excluded from voting included laborers, tenant farmers, unskilled workers and indentured servants. These were considered to lack a "stake in society" and to be vulnerable to corruption.

Tax issues and budget decisions originated in the assembly. Part of the budget went toward the cost of raising and equipping the colonial militia. As the American Revolution drew near, this subject was a point of contention and conflict between the provincial assemblies and their respective governors.

The perennial struggles between the colonial governors and the assemblies are sometimes viewed, in retrospect, as signs of a rising democratic spirit. However, those assemblies generally represented the privileged classes, and they were protecting the colony against unreasonable executive encroachments. Legally, the crown governor's authority was unassailable. In resisting that authority, assemblies resorted to arguments based upon natural rights and the common welfare, giving life to the notion that governments derived, or ought to derive, their authority from the consent of the governed.

== Local government ==
Virginia and Maryland were colonies characterized by dispersed plantations and few towns. The main unit of local government was the county, which was controlled by wealthy planters. On the assembly's advice, the governor appointed the judges, the sheriff, and the county clerk. In addition to conducting trials, the county court was responsible for many other functions including:

- tavern and ferry licensing
- road maintenance
- local taxation
- militia supervision
- assembly elections
- enforcing colonial laws

== Union proposals ==
Before the American Revolution, attempts to create a unified government for the thirteen colonies were unsuccessful. Multiple plans for a union were proposed at the Albany Congress in 1754. One of these plans, proposed by Benjamin Franklin, was the Albany Plan.

== Demise ==
During the American Revolution, the colonial governments ceased to function effectively as royal governors prorogued and dissolved the assemblies. By 1773, committees of correspondence were governing towns and counties, and nearly all the colonies had established provincial congresses, which were legislative assemblies acting outside of royal authority. These were temporary measures, and it was understood that the provincial congresses were not equivalent to proper legislatures.

By May 1775, the Massachusetts Provincial Congress felt that a permanent government was needed. On the advice of the Second Continental Congress, Massachusetts once again operated under the Charter of 1691 but without a governor (the governor's council functioned as the executive branch). In the fall of 1775, the Continental Congress recommended that New Hampshire, South Carolina and Virginia form new governments. New Hampshire adopted a republican constitution on January 5, 1776. South Carolina's constitution was adopted on March 26, and Virginia's constitution was adopted on June 29.

In May 1776, the Continental Congress called for the creation of new governments "where no government sufficient to the exigencies of their affairs have been hitherto established" and "that the exercise of every kind of authority under the ... Crown should be totally suppressed". The Declaration of Independence in July further encouraged the states to form new governments, and most states had adopted new constitutions by the end of 1776. Because of the Revolutionary War, New York and Georgia did not complete constitutions until 1777.

== See also ==
- Colonial history of the United States
- Impeachment in the Thirteen Colonies
- Proprietary House
- Salutary neglect
