= Charter colony =

Class of colonial government

Charter colony is one of three classes of colonial government established in the 17th century English colonies in North America, the other classes being proprietary colony and crown colony. These colonies were operated under a corporate charter given by the crown. The colonies of Virginia, Rhode Island, Connecticut, and Massachusetts Bay were at one time or another charter colonies. The crown might revoke a charter and convert the colony into a crown colony. In a charter colony, Britain granted a charter to the colonial government establishing the rules under which the colony was to be governed. The charters of Rhode Island and Connecticut granted the colonists significantly more political liberty than other colonies. Rhode Island and Connecticut continued to use their colonial charters as their State constitutions after the American Revolution.

== Massachusetts Bay Colony ==
In 1628, a Puritan group of well-rounded businessmen created the Governor for and Company of Massachusetts Bay to be a profitable investment in the colonies. The Council for New England authorized a land grant, allowing the company rights to the area between the Charles and Merrimack rivers westward to the Pacific Ocean. Seeking surplus protection for their endeavor, the Puritans requested and were granted a charter from England. In 1629, the businessmen undertaking the New World endeavor signed the Cambridge Agreement, agreeing to accomplish the Atlantic voyage for complete authority over the charter and the colony. The power transfer was an influential step to creating a theocratic Massachusetts. Political power was held by the staunch Puritanical fellow believers. In 1684, the royal charter was taken away, splitting the Massachusetts Bay company and the colony. In 1691, Plymouth Colony and Maine were absorbed in a new royal charter.

== Rhode Island ==
Rhode Island's permanent settlement by European colonists began in 1636 when a group of refugees from the Massachusetts Bay Colony left the colony to seek freedom of worship. Roger Williams, the unofficial head of the group of refugees, acquired land from Native Americans and established the town of Providence. Other early towns settled in the Rhode Island area were Portsmouth (1638), Newport (1639), and Warwick (1642). The lands on which these original four towns were settled were held only through Indian deeds, so naturally, they caught the attention of nearby colonies. In order to protect the small haven that the town had established, Williams acquired a parliamentary patent from England between the years 1643 and 1644. Rhode Island is a charter colony. In the early 1660s, John Clarke was given the task of getting from King Charles II a charter that would both protect the colony from surrounding larger colonies and preserve the religious ideals that had been present with the colony since its beginning. The charter that the colony received was the royal charter of 1663. This charter, said to be one of the most liberal of the colonial era, not only granted the religious freedom that the colony sought, but also allowed Rhode Island to have local autonomy and gave the colony a much tighter grip on its territory.

== Connecticut ==
A royal charter was not granted for Connecticut until 1662. The charter was proposed by John Winthrop the Younger or John Withthrop Jr. and granted by Charles II. Up to that date, the people of Connecticut had only negotiated titles for ownership with the Indians, having no titles recognized by England on Connecticut soil. The only restrictions limiting the newly appointed charter's independent powers were, like other royal charters, the boundaries set by English law. While Connecticut power's had the ability to create new laws, they were to not exceed the limits or contradict with the rules set place by English government. Attempting to absorb the New Haven Colony created tensions due to the colony's resistance to any attempted control by Connecticut. Only after the perceived threat of absorption by New York was realized, did New Haven give in and agree to merge with Connecticut (though not before losing many people wishing to maintain independence from Connecticut rule, through migration to New Jersey.) Connecticut was not free from the control of England through the royal charter until after the conflict with King James II. Even after the conflict with England, Connecticut was still able to retain a liberal charter from England.

== See also ==
- Proprietary colony
- Royal colony
- Colonial charters in the Thirteen Colonies
- Somers Isles Company
- Providence Island colony
- British America
- British colonization of the Americas
- North Borneo
- Impact of Western European colonialism and colonisation
