= History of monarchy in Australia =

Australia is a constitutional monarchy whose Sovereign also serves as Monarch of the United Kingdom, New Zealand, Canada and eleven other former dependencies of the United Kingdom including Papua New Guinea, which was formerly a dependency of Australia. These countries operate as independent nations, and are known as Commonwealth realms. The history of the Australian monarchy has involved a shifting relationship with both the monarch and also the British government.

The east coast of Australia was claimed in 1770, by Captain James Cook, in the name of and under instruction from King George III. The colony of New South Wales was founded in the name of the British sovereign eighteen years later, followed by five more: Tasmania (1825), Western Australia (1829), South Australia (1836), Victoria (1851), and Queensland (1859).

== Royal visits before Federation 1901 ==
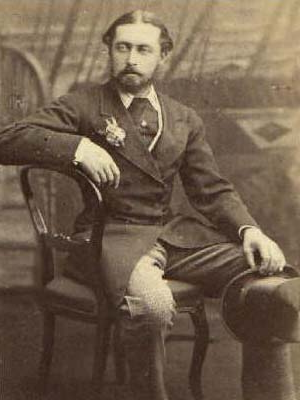
Prince Alfred, the first member of the British royal family to tour Australia.

Prince Alfred, fourth child of Queen Victoria, became the first member of the Royal Family to visit the burgeoning colonies of Australia. He visited for five months in 1867, when he commanded HMS Galatea. He toured Adelaide, Melbourne, Brisbane, Tasmania and Sydney. The Melbourne Argus wrote on 26 November 1867: '[The Colony of] Victoria has not known in her thirty years' life a brighter day than yesterday. A Royal Prince, son of the greatest and noblest Queen that ever sat on the Throne of the British Empire, has landed on our shores, enjoyed our hospitality, and we are proud to know that we have done him honour worthy of ourselves and of the family he represents.'

On his second visit to Sydney, the only assassination attempt against a member of the royal family in Australia took place. While the prince picnicked at Clontarf, near Sydney, Henry James O'Farrell, a man of Irish descent, approached Alfred and shot at him, lodging a bullet in his spine. The attack caused indignation and embarrassment in the colony, leading to a wave of anti-Irish sentiment. The next day, 20,000 people attended a meeting to protest at "yesterday's outrage"; Australians felt discomfited by the negative attention being drawn to their colonies.

After the prince spent five weeks in hospital, the Legislative Assembly of New South Wales voted to approve the erection of a monument to the event, "in testimony of the heartfelt gratitude of the community at the recovery of HRH", which became the Prince Alfred Hospital. The Prince granted the use of his coat of arms as the hospital's crest, and the institution later received royal designation from King Edward VII in 1902.

Fourteen years after the arrival of Prince Alfred, his nephews Princes George and Albert arrived to tour South Australia, Victoria and New South Wales, while midshipmen on HMS Bacchante.

== Federation ==
On 1 January 1901 Australia became a nation and dominion of the monarchy.

In the latter half of the nineteenth century, public concern over intercolonial tariffs, defence and immigration led to a meeting of colonial representatives in Melbourne in 1889. Dominated by the "Father of Federation", New South Wales Premier Sir Henry Parkes, they agreed in principle to a union of the Australian colonies under the British Crown.

A series of constitutional conventions prepared a constitution, which Australians then presented to London. On 1 January 1901, the six Australian colonies federated into one self-governing colony of the British Empire. (Note: "The Commonwealth shall be taken to be a self-governing colony", Commonwealth of Australia Constitution Act) This followed the granting of Royal Assent to the Commonwealth of Australia Constitution Act by Queen Victoria on 9 July 1900. Styled a Dominion from 1907, Australia was later referred to as a realm of the Crown from the 1950s onward, so as to reflect the equal status of Australia with the other countries under the shared Crown, which came into effect with the passage of the Statute of Westminster in 1931.

The death of the Queen – cast on the Empire a shadow like the blackness of an eclipse, and nowhere was that shadow darker than in Australasia – she was the symbol – the human embodiment – of the Empire...

— W. H. Fitchett, author and editor, Review of Reviews for Australasia, 20 February 1901

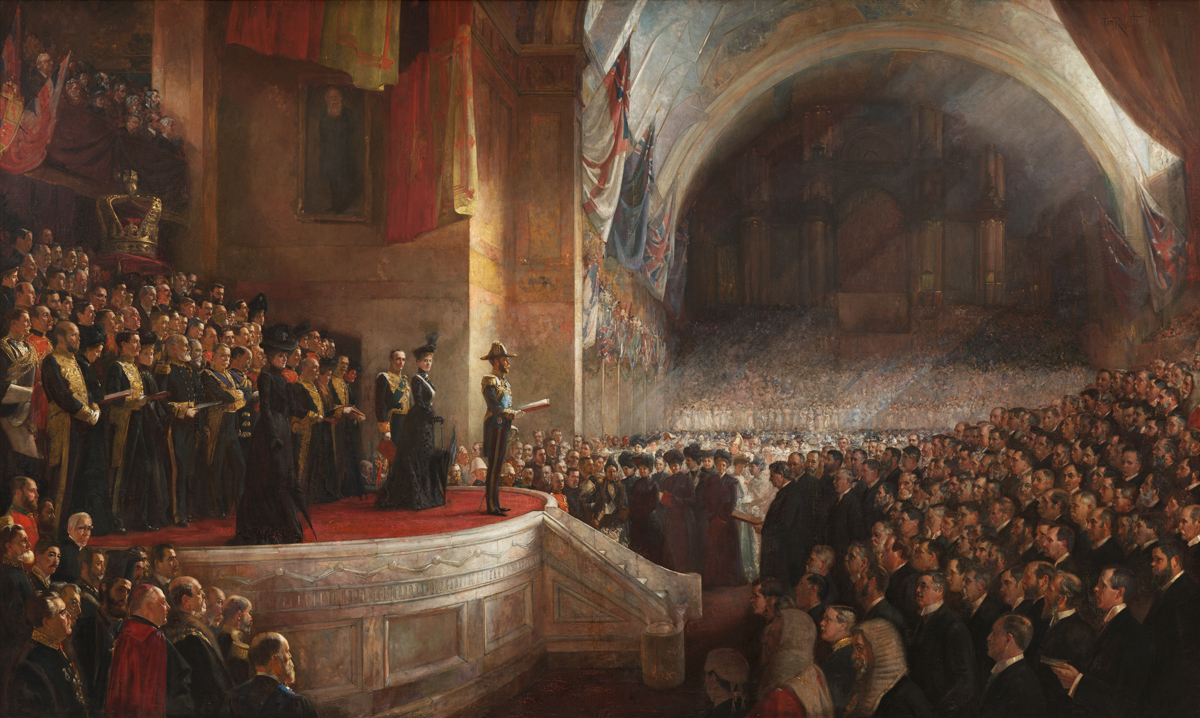
The opening of the Parliament of Australia on 9 May 1901, Melbourne, Australia

In 1901 Prince George (then the Prince of Wales and later King George V) returned to open the first Parliament of the Commonwealth of Australia, in Melbourne.

In 1920 Prince Edward, Prince of Wales (later Edward VIII) visited Australia. The public called him the "Digger prince" (digger in Australian slang means an Australian soldier with a particular reputation for bravery and fair play).

In 1927, Prince Albert (later George VI) visited Australia to open the first Parliament to sit in Parliament House, Canberra, the Australian capital.

Prince Henry, Duke of Gloucester, came to assist in the celebrations of the centenary of the state of Victoria in 1932. In 1945 he was appointed Governor-General of the Commonwealth, against the advice of the Australian government. He was the only member of the Royal Family to serve as a viceroy in Australia.

== The Statute of Westminster ==
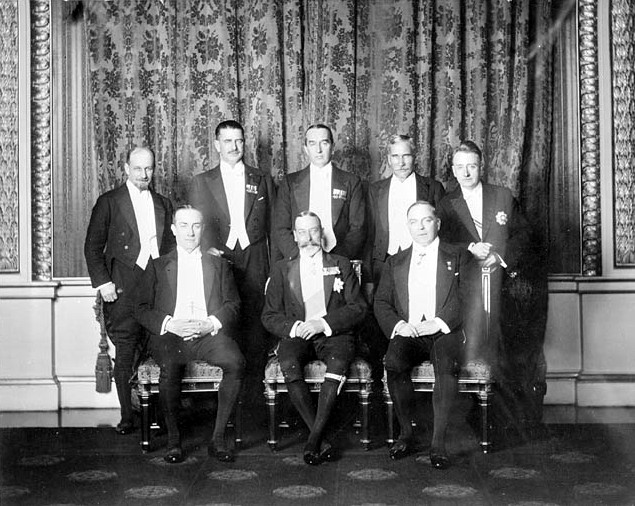
George V with his prime ministers at the 1926 Imperial Conference. The Balfour Declaration was issued at the conference, which saw the governors general end their relation with the British government, and serve only as the representative of the Monarch.

During the 1926 Imperial Conference, the governments of the Dominions and of the United Kingdom endorsed the Balfour Declaration of 1926, which declared that the Dominions were autonomous members of the British Empire, equal to each other and to the United Kingdom. The Statute of Westminster 1931 gave legal effect to the Balfour Declaration and other decisions made at the Imperial Conferences. Most importantly, it declared that the Parliament of the United Kingdom no longer had any legislative authority over the Dominions. Previously, the Dominions were legally self-governing colonies of the United Kingdom, and thus had no legal international status. The Statute made the Dominions de jure independent nations.

The Statute took effect immediately over Canada, South Africa and the Irish Free State. However, Australia, New Zealand and Newfoundland had to ratify the Statute through legislation before it would apply to them. Canada also requested certain exemptions from the Statute in regard to the Canadian Constitution.

Australian politicians initially resisted ratification of the Statute. John Latham, the Attorney-General and Minister for External Affairs under Prime Minister Joseph Lyons, was particularly opposed to ratifying the Statute, because he thought it would weaken military and political ties with the United Kingdom. Latham had attended both the 1926 Imperial Conference and the 1919 Paris Peace Conference, and he had much experience in international affairs. He preferred that the relationship between the United Kingdom and the Dominions not be codified in legislation.

However, other politicians supported the Statute, and the new independence it gave to Australia.

With the passage of the Statute of Westminster Adoption Act 1942, the British Parliament could no longer legislate for the Australian Commonwealth without the express request and consent of the Australian Parliament. The act received Royal Assent on 9 October 1942, but the adoption of the Statute was made retroactive to 3 September 1939, when Australia entered World War II.

== The Isaacs appointment ==
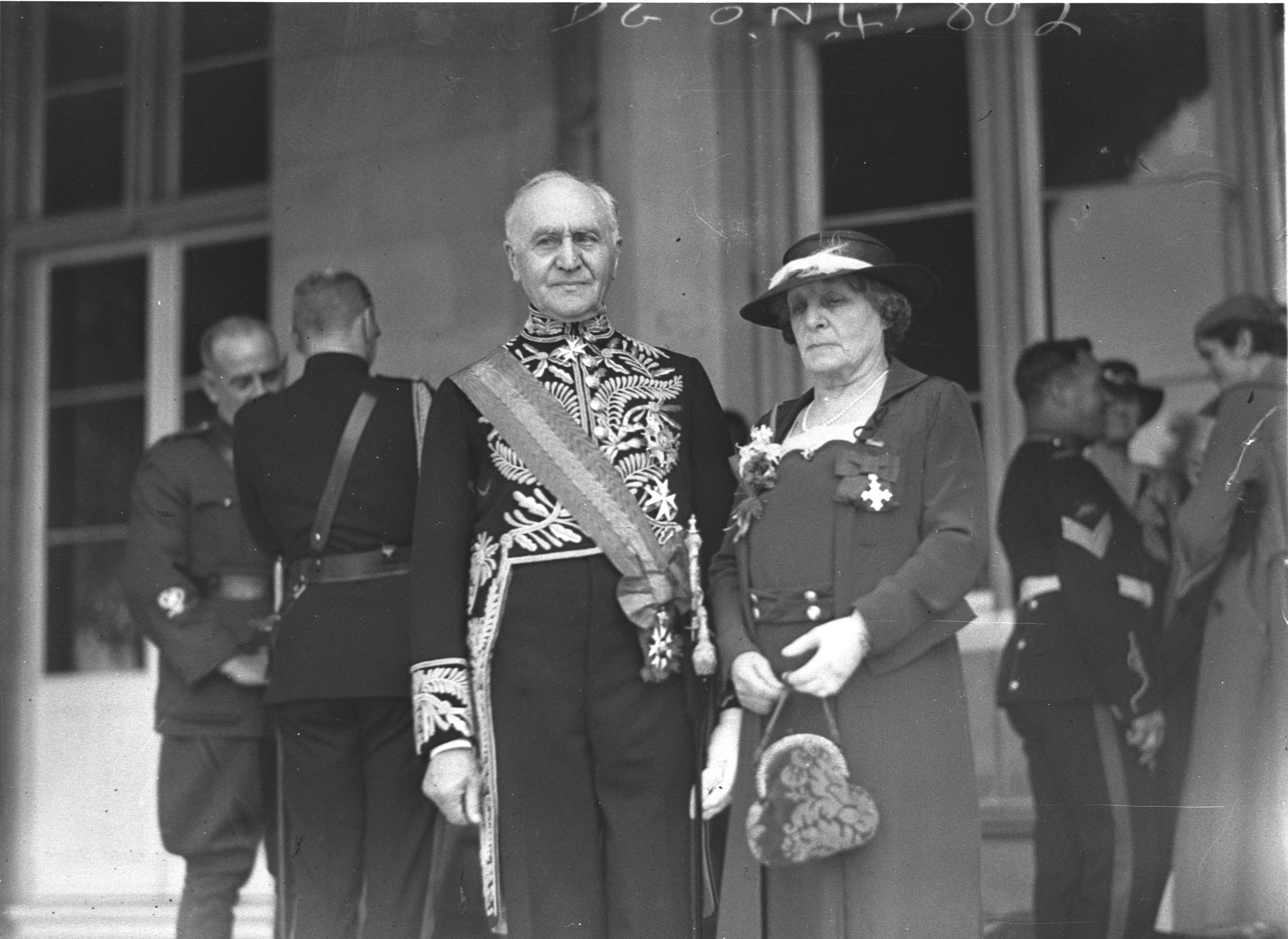
Sir Isaac Isaacs and Lady Isaacs, c. 1934

An important change in the relationship between the Sovereign and the Australian government and the Governor-General of Australia was marked by the appointment of Sir Isaac Isaacs as Governor-General. Isaacs was the first Australian-born Governor-General. The Commonwealth Cabinet, headed by James Scullin, considered his name in 1930. Isaacs was Chief Justice and a Justice of the High Court.

Prime Minister Billy Hughes had asserted the right of dominion governments to be consulted on the choice of Governors-General in 1919. Prime Minister Edmund Barton had made a similar assertion two decades earlier. Hughes was invited to select the name of the Governor-General from a list of three (British) names made up by the Secretary of State of the Colonial Office. The choice was however recommended to the King, George V, by the Secretary of State for Dominion Affairs.

But the Commonwealth government directly nominating and recommending a Governor-General occasioned a controversy, both in the press at home and in Buckingham Palace. The Leader of the Opposition, John Latham, took the view that the federal executive councillors could advise the Governor-General, but not the King. George V was of the same opinion. The King's private secretary wrote to the secretary of State in London:

His Majesty feels strongly that it would be a grave mistake to give the Prime Minister of the Commonwealth an opportunity of naming the next Governor-General

And George, believing that the Governor-General was the personal representative of the Sovereign, intervened directly. The Palace wrote:

The King feels that, with the change in the position of the governor-general (sic) made at the Imperial Conference of 1926, which divested them of all political power and eliminated them from the administrative machinery of the respective Dominions, leaving them merely as the representative of the Sovereign, more than ever His Majesty should be consulted in the selection of candidates, and indeed, subject of course to the concurrence of the British Prime Minister, be left to make the choice himself.

Scullin raised the question of dominion governments directly advising the King on vice-regal appointments at the 1930 Imperial Conference. It was decided that the King should act on the advice of his dominion ministers. Still, Scullin had to go to London personally to persuade the King to appoint Isaacs. George reluctantly agreed. After Isaacs, two more British nominees followed: Lord Gowrie (1936–1945) and Prince Henry, Duke of Gloucester (1945–1947). Nevertheless, the principle had been established that the Governor-General was the constitutional representative, not the personal representative, of the Sovereign. This was an important step in establishing the independence of the office. In 1988, the commission established by the government of Bob Hawke to review the Constitution could report:

Although the Governor-General is the Queen's representative in Australia, the Governor-General is in no sense a delegate of the Queen.

== Secessionist Movement ==
The isolated, mineral-rich colony of Western Australia had been reluctant to federate. The Constitution does not list Western Australia as one of the original states. Discontent with federation lead to a referendum on 8 April 1933. In answer to the question 'are you in favour of the State of Western Australia withdrawing from the Federal Commonwealth established under the Commonwealth of Australia Constitutional Act (Imperial)?' the people of Western Australia voted in the affirmative by two to one.

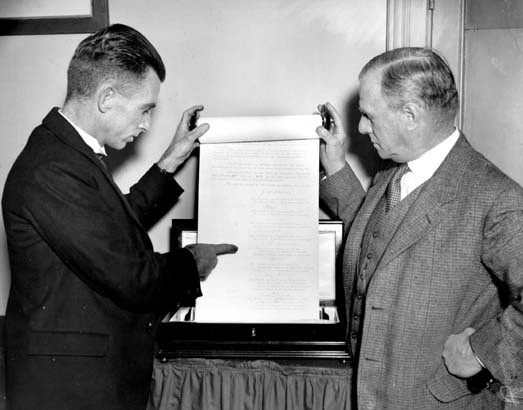
Keith Watson (left) and James MacCallum Smith (right), showing a page of the 1933 secession petition.

The referendum brought the secessionist Labor government of Philip Collier to power. In 1934 the new government sent a delegation to London to petition the King, George V, and the British Parliament to overturn the Commonwealth of Australia Constitution Act 1900. Such an act would have dissolved the Commonwealth and left the states free to federate anew or not as they wished. A joint committee of the House of Lords and House of Commons considered the petition, and rejected it in 1935. It did so on the grounds that it could not overturn the Act without the approval of the Federal Parliament.

== Abdication of Edward VIII ==
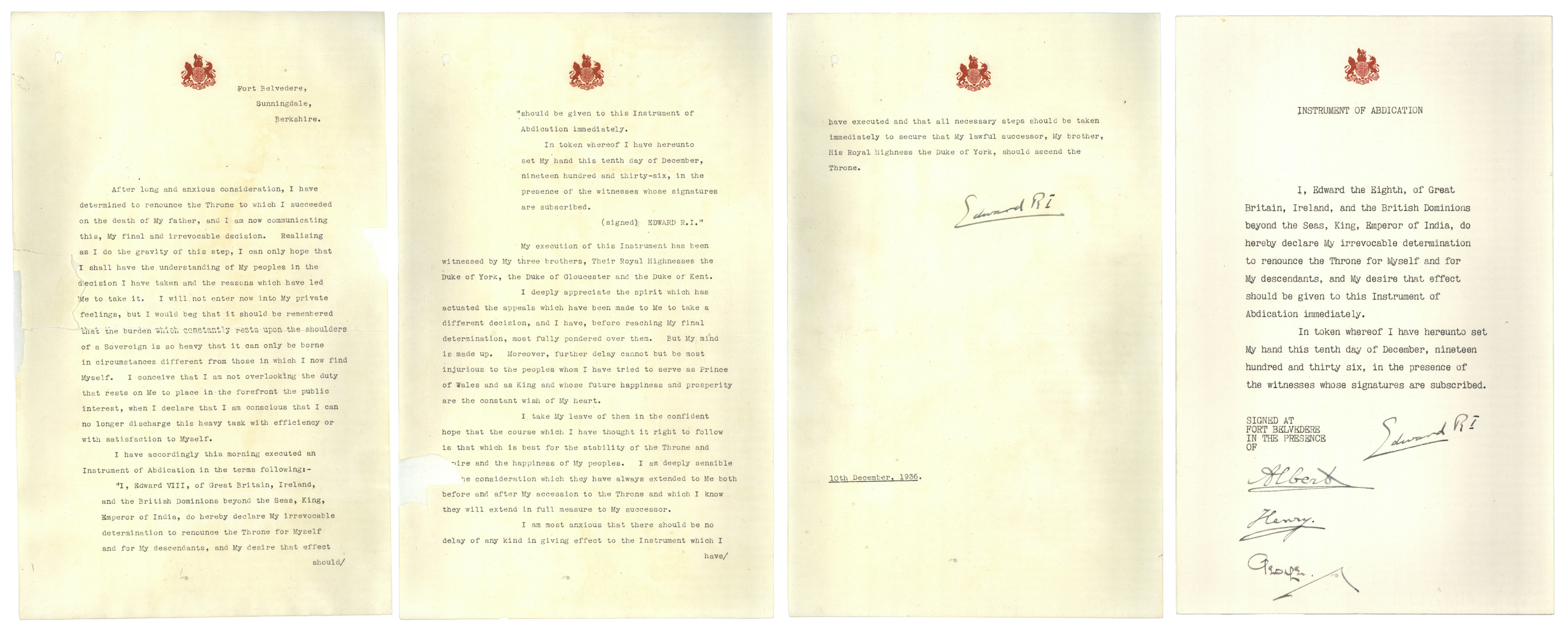
Abdication statement of Edward VIII

On 10 December 1936 Edward VIII abdicated after it became clear that the British and Dominion governments would not accept his intended marriage to American divorcee and commoner, Wallis Simpson. The Statute of Westminster required the Dominion governments be consulted on matters relating to the succession. The Dominions Office in London proposed three solutions to the crisis to the governments of Australia, New Zealand, South Africa, India and Canada:

- marriage of the King to Simpson; Simpson would become Queen
- a morganatic marriage (Simpson would not have the title or honours of a queen, and any issue would have no rights of succession)
- abdication of the King.

Australia, South Africa and Canada chose abdication. India and New Zealand had no firm view. According to Harold Laski, writing in The New York Times,

This issue is independent of the personality of the King. It is independent of the personality of the Prime Minister. It does not touch on the wisdom or unwisdom of the marriage the King has proposed. It is not concerned with the pressure, whether of the churches or the aristocracy, that is hostile to this marriage. It is the principle that out of this issue no precedent must be created that makes the Royal authority once more a source of independent political power in the State.

According to this view, the constitutional independence of the Dominions was at stake. This event demonstrated the legal independence of the Dominion monarchies established by the Statute of Westminster.

== Reign of Elizabeth II ==
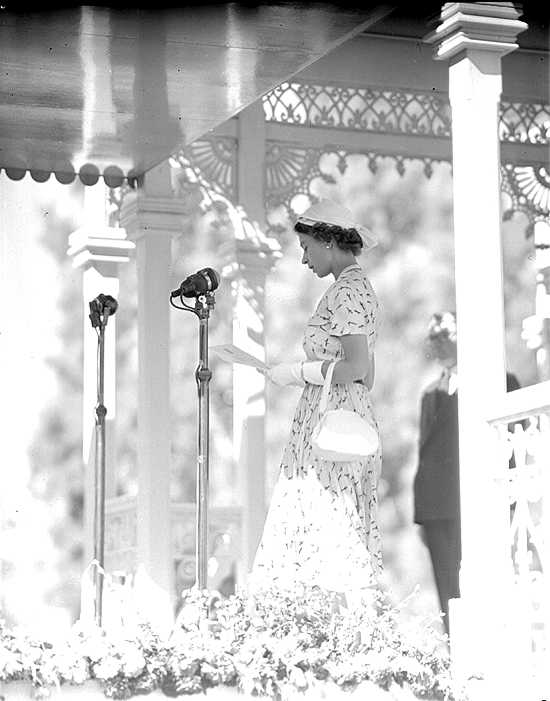
Queen Elizabeth II reads a speech in Sydney during her visit in Australia in 1954.

In 1954, Queen Elizabeth II became the first reigning Australian monarch to visit Australia. Her presence provided a sense of certainty to the nation, as well as focusing world attention on Australia. Around 7 million Australians (of a total population of just under 9 million at the time) greeted her.

She returned on several occasions (a total of 15 official visits) and officiated at such important moments as the bicentenary in 1970 of James Cook's voyage along the East Coast of Australia; the opening of the Sydney Opera House in 1973; her Silver Jubilee in 1977; proclamation of the Australia Act in 1986; various events commemorating the bicentenary of the arrival of First Fleet and the opening of the new Parliament House in Canberra in 1988; the centenary of federation in 2000; her Golden Jubilee in 2002; and more.

The National Carillon in Canberra was dedicated by Elizabeth II on 25 April 1970. The Swan Bells in Perth include the twelve bells of Saint Martin-in-the-Fields that were cast between 1725 and 1770 by three generations of the Rudhall family of bell founders from Gloucester, under the order of the Prince of Wales, later crowned as King George II. Donated to Perth in 1988, they are known to have pealed as the explorer James Cook set sail on the voyage that founded Australia, and are the only sets of royal bells to have left England.

=== Queen of Australia ===
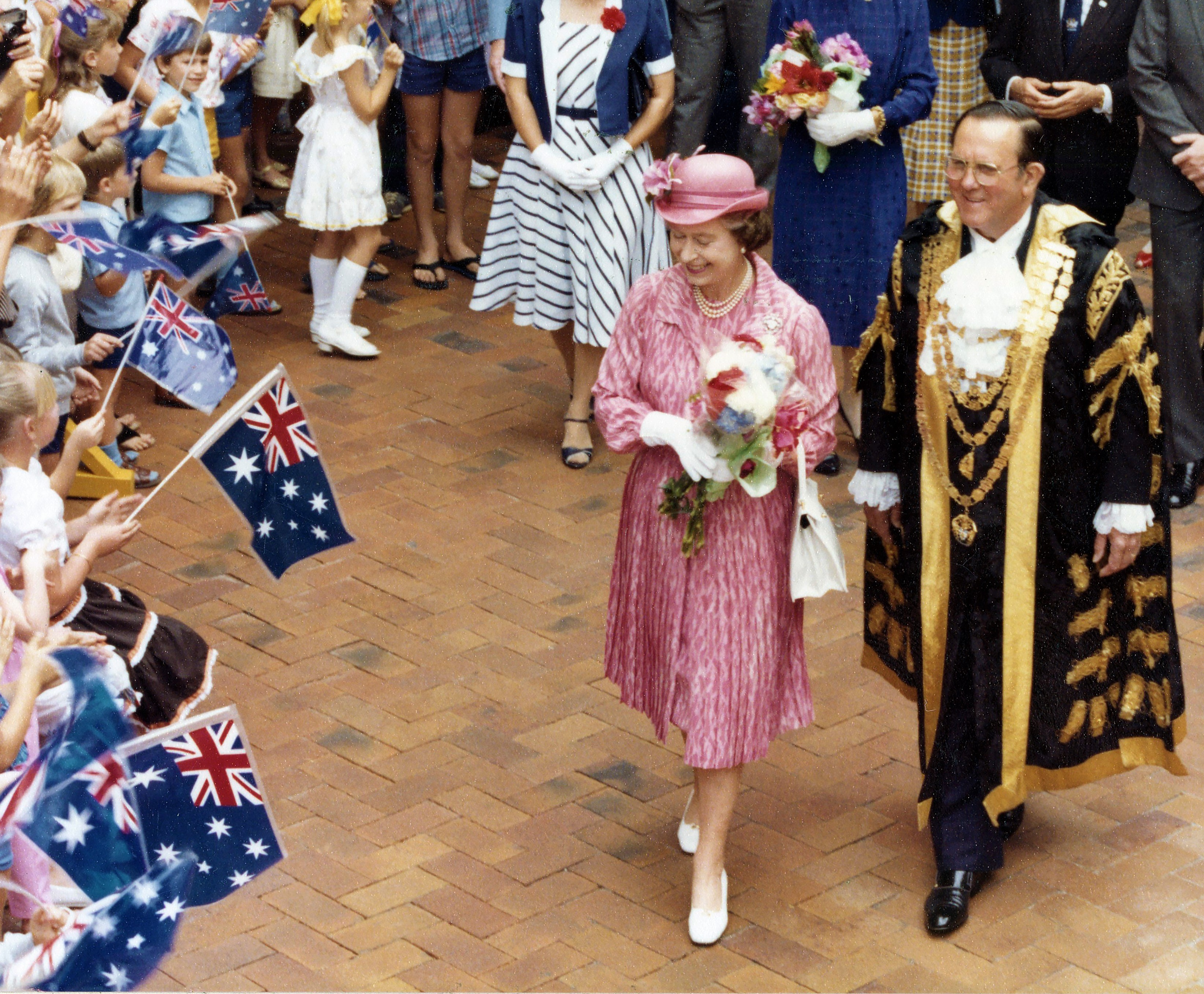
The Queen of Australia in Brisbane, 1982

Elizabeth II was the first monarch of Australia to adopt a separate Australian standard to represent her as Australia's sovereign

Elizabeth II was the first monarch to be styled sovereign of Australia. In 1953 the Australian Parliament passed two bills. The first was the Royal Style and Titles Act 1953. This added the word "Australia" to the Queen's titles. The Royal Style and Titles Act 1973 removed "Defender of the Faith" from her Australian title. In 1958 Elizabeth amended the letters patent of Queen Victoria which constituted the office of Governor-General.

Until then Australian constitutional documents were signed by the monarch and counter-signed by a British minister of state. But now such documents were to be counter-signed by the Prime Minister of Australia. Further, they were to be sealed with the Great Seal of the Commonwealth of Australia. Queen Victoria's letters patent had ordered a Great Seal for Australia in 1900, but it was never made. On 19 October 1955 Elizabeth, advised by Prime Minister Robert Menzies, issued a warrant for the seal.

The Royal Powers Act 1953 further secured the sovereign's new status as Queen of Australia by conferring on her powers that the Constitution did not give her. The Queen could now preside at Federal Executive Councils in person and open the Commonwealth Parliament. Elizabeth II performed both actions three times each during her reign.

On 30 May 1973 the prerogative of appointing Australian ambassadors to nations outside the Commonwealth was transferred to the Governor-General. Likewise the viceroy assumed authority to appoint high commissioners to Commonwealth countries. The line of communication between sovereign and viceroy became the Australian High Commission in London, in place of the British High Commission in Canberra. When mention of the United Kingdom was removed from the Queen's titles in Australia in the same year, the government of the state of Queensland, concerned that this action was a first step towards declaring Australia to be a republic, sought to declare her "Queen of Australia, Queensland and her Other Realms and Territories", in order to ensure that the monarchy would at least be entrenched in Queensland.

The action was blocked by the High Court of Australia in the so-called Queen of Queensland case in 1974. However, it highlighted the fact that the relation of the Australian states to the Crown was then independent of the relation of the Commonwealth to the Crown, and this paradox led to the Hannah and the Wran affairs which eventually led to the Australia Act 1986.

=== The Dismissal, and the Hannah and Wran Affairs ===
The Australian monarch rarely intervenes in Australian affairs. During the 1975 constitutional crisis over the failure of Gough Whitlam's Labor government to secure supply, the Queen remained neutral, which both sides of the debate took to imply tacit approval. When Governor-General Sir John Kerr dismissed Whitlam, the Labor Speaker of the House of Representatives, Gordon Scholes, asked the Queen to revoke her viceroy's act. The Queen's Private Secretary replied:

As we understand the situation here, the Australian Constitution firmly places the prerogative powers of the Crown in the hands of the Governor-General as the representative of the Queen of Australia. The only person competent to commission an Australian Prime Minister is the Governor-General, and The Queen has no part in the decisions which the Governor-General must take in accordance with the Constitution. Her Majesty, as Queen of Australia, is watching events in Canberra with close interest and attention, but it would not be proper for her to intervene in person in matters which are so clearly placed within the jurisdiction of the Governor-General by the Constitution Act.

The reluctance of the Queen of Australia to become involved in this high-profile political crisis involving the Commonwealth government contrasted with other instances when the monarch and her officers became directly involved in the politics of Australian states. In 1975, prior to the Dismissal, the Governor of Queensland, Sir Colin Hannah criticised the Whitlam government in a partisan manner. At the time, Hannah was commissioned Administrator, or acting governor-general, whenever John Kerr was out of the country. The Queen acted on Whitlam's advice to withdraw this commission. The United Kingdom government later advised the Queen not to dismiss him, on the grounds that it would be hard to justify the dismissal of Hannah for political involvement, when Kerr remained beyond reproach for his role in the 1975 constitutional crisis. She did, however, refuse to extend his term.

The Premier of Queensland, Joh Bjelke-Petersen argued that the Queen is to be advised by the state premier on her choice of governors, and so London ought not to advise the sovereign in the matter. Whitlam's successor, Malcolm Fraser, sought to have Hannah's commission restored. He was refused, and the British foreign secretary, Lord Carrington, then the principal adviser to the Queen on state matters, advised Hannah of his impropriety during Whitlam's term of office.

This episode greatly concerned Australian state premiers on both sides of politics. They had governed in the belief that convention meant they were the Queen's advisers in state matters, not British ministers. London's actions were indicative of the direct relationship between the Queen of the United Kingdom and the Governors of the Australian states. This relationship now appeared to bypass the Queen's role as the Australian monarch, and her link to the Governor-General and the Commonwealth. Apparently the Queen of the United Kingdom still had direct powers over the Australian states where she acted in that role on the advice of her British ministers.

State governors had been dismissed by monarchs before. In 1917 George V had recalled Sir Gerald Strickland, Governor of New South Wales. Strickland had leaked to the press that he was about to dismiss the premier, William Holman. However, the king had been acting at the request of Holman, and the king had acted according to convention, on the advice of his chief minister.

In 1980 Neville Wran, the Premier of New South Wales, announced his intention to introduce a bill that would require the Queen to be advised by Australian state ministers alone on matters concerning the governance of that state.

Wran had tested the British ministers by requesting the Governor of New South Wales not be told of his impending re-appointment. When British officials ignored this request, Wran took it as proof of their willingness to interfere in Australian state affairs. Buckingham Palace was alarmed at the impending bill, and when it was passed through both houses of the New South Wales Parliament, Lord Carrington wrote to Sir Roden Cutler, the state's Governor, telling him that the Queen would refuse royal assent to the bill. (Note: 'I recalled to her majesty [sic] that it was my duty to advise her to refuse her assent to legislation which in my own view was unconstitutional whatever my view of the merits of such legislation might be.') The secretary of the Premier's Department, Gerry Gleason, told the British Consul-General that New South Wales was 'being buggered about' and that the British needed their 'backsides kicked'. (Note: Australians have a relaxed attitude towards colourful language. It is not uncommon for it to be used in political discourse.)

The constitutional problem was resolved by the Australia Act 1986. By this act all state governors are appointed by the Queen on the advice of the state's premier alone. British ministers have no constitutional authority to advise the Queen on any matter related to the Australian states. There is debate as to whether the actions of the Australian states have in effect made Queen Elizabeth their direct monarch the same way she is Queen of Australia, effectively making her the Queen of New South Wales, of Victoria, of Tasmania, of South Australia, of Western Australia, and also the Queen of Queensland. (Note: The relationship between the sovereign, her governors and governments, including a discussion of the Hannah and Wran affairs, is discussed by Anne Twomey (2006))

=== Referendum on the monarchy ===
In the 1970s more Australians began to seriously reconsider Australia's constitutional framework. The constitutional crisis of 1975 occasioned many to question the role of the monarchy in a modern Australia. There were no serious attempts to alter the constitutional role of the Queen until the Australia Act 1986. Nevertheless Australians were more conscious of being an independent nation, and there was a downplaying of the monarchy in Australia, with references to the monarchy being removed from the public eye (e.g., the Queen's portrait from public buildings and schools).

Public attitudes were quietly changing, though republicanism did not become a seriously considered proposition until 1991, when Labor Prime Minister Paul Keating formed the Republic Advisory Committee to investigate the possibility of Australia becoming a republic. Under Liberal/National Coalition Prime Minister John Howard, Australia held a two-question referendum. The first question asked whether Australia should become a republic with a president appointed by parliament, a bi-partisan appointment model which had previously been decided at a constitutional convention in February 1998.

The second question, generally deemed to be far less important politically, asked whether Australia should alter the constitution to insert a preamble. Neither of the amendments passed, with the question on the republic defeated by 54.4% in the popular vote and 6-0 in the states. While monarchists declared the result proof that the people were happy with the monarchy, republican voices stated that it was indicative of the lack of choice given in the republican model.

Four months after the referendum, the Queen returned to Australia in 2000. In Sydney, in a speech at the Conference Centre in Darling Harbour, she stated her belief in the democratic rights of Australians on all issues including that of the monarchy:

My family and I would, of course, have retained our deep affection for Australia and Australians everywhere, whatever the outcome. For some while it has been clear that many Australians have wanted constitutional change... You can understand, therefore, that it was with the closest interest that I followed the debate leading up to the referendum held last year on the proposal to amend the Constitution. I have always made it clear that the future of the monarchy in Australia is an issue for you, the Australian people, and you alone to decide by democratic and constitutional means. It should not be otherwise. As I said at the time, I respect and accept the outcome of the referendum. In the light of the result last November I shall continue faithfully to serve as Queen of Australia under the constitution to the very best of my ability, as I have tried to do for the last 48 years.

=== The new millennium ===
In March 2006, organisers of the 2006 Commonwealth Games in Melbourne came under fire when it was announced that they would not play "God Save the Queen" at the ceremonies where the Queen was to open the Games. Despite the fact that the song is officially the Australian Royal Anthem, to be played whenever the sovereign is present, the games organisers refused to play it. After repeated calls from Prime Minister John Howard, organisers agreed to play eight bars of the Royal Anthem at the opening ceremony.

However, there remained speculation that the opening of the games could be "thrown into chaos" should thousands of Australians continue to sing "God Save the Queen" after the eight bars were complete, drowning out singer Dame Kiri Te Kanawa and the Melbourne Symphony Orchestra. In the end, with the crowd singing along, Dame Kiri sang Happy Birthday to the Queen, the rendition of which then turned into an abbreviated God Save the Queen, and at which point the majority of attendees at the stadium stood.

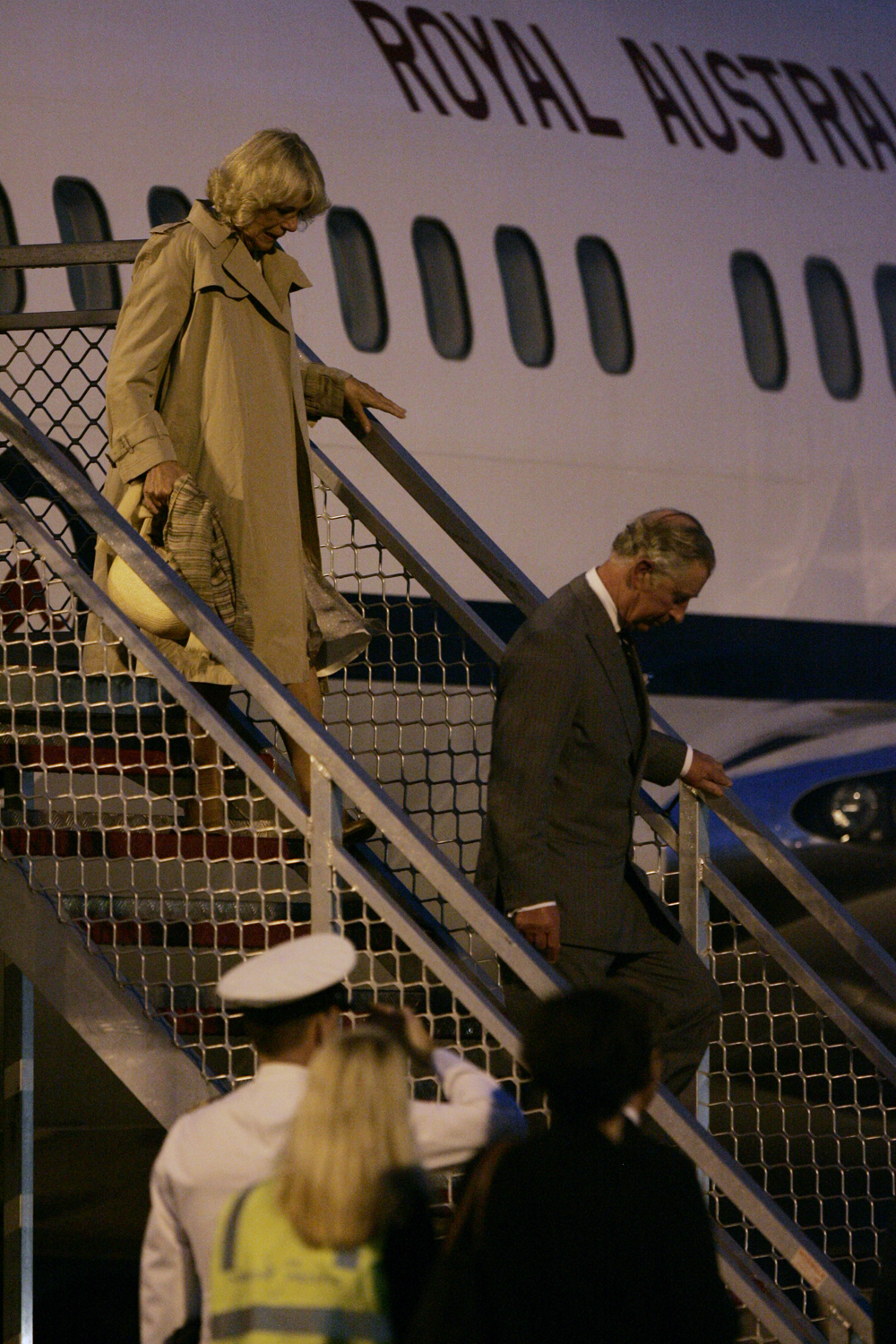
Prince Charles and Camilla, Duchess of Cornwall, arriving at Sydney Airport from Melbourne, 8 November 2012

When Labor Prime Minister Kevin Rudd assumed office in 2007, he stated that the republic was not a priority for his first term. He did affirm that it formed part of the Labor policy platform. During a visit to Britain in April 2008 he stated his belief that the republican debate should continue. During the weekend of 19/20 April a meeting of various members of Australian society met in Canberra to come up with ideas for Australia's future. This has become known as the Australia 2020 Summit. The republic was floated again, and widely supported. Rudd came out in support and intimated that the republic may become a reality before the end of the reign of Elizabeth II. Former Prime Minister Julia Gillard (2010-2013 ) stated that she is a republican. However she wished an appropriate model of republic be explored before the issue was taken to the people again. Kevin Rudd did not flag the question of a republic during his second term of office as Prime Minister.

Malcolm Turnbull said of Queen Elizabeth's reign: "She's been an extraordinary head of state, and I think, frankly, in Australia, there are more Elizabethans than there are monarchists."

On 22 February 2009, Princess Anne represented the Queen at the National Bushfires Memorial Service in Melbourne. The Queen also showed her support for the people of Australia by making a personal statement about the bushfires and by also making a private donation to the Australian Red Cross Appeal. The Duke of Edinburgh was the first to sign a book of condolences at the Australian High Commission in London.

== Monarchs of Australia ==
The monarchs of Australia are the same as those of the United Kingdom. The sovereigns reigned over Australia as monarchs of the United Kingdom until 1942 (by a legal fiction, from 1939). From that year they reigned as sovereigns in right of Australia, though the first to be accorded an Australian title, Queen of Australia, was Elizabeth II, in 1953. After the Queen's death in 2022, her son Charles III took over.

Sovereigns of Australia from 1900 to present:
#	Name	Picture	Reign
House of Hanover
1	Victoria		1 January 1901 – 22 January 1901
House of Saxe-Coburg and Gotha
2	Edward VII		22 January 1901 – 6 May 1910
House of Windsor
3	George V		6 May 1910 – 20 January 1936
4	Edward VIII		20 January 1936 – 11 December 1936
5	George VI		11 December 1936 – 6 February 1952
6	Elizabeth II		6 February 1952 – 8 September 2022
7	Charles III		8 September 2022

== See also ==
- History of monarchy in Canada
- History of monarchy in the United Kingdom
- Republicanism in Australia

== Citations ==
=== References ===
- Andrews, E. M. (1993). The Anzac Illusion: Anglo-Australian Relations during World War I. Cambridge University Press. ISBN 0-521-41914-X.
- Day, David (1997). Claiming a Continent: a History of Australia. Harper Collins. ISBN 9780732256234.
- Day, David (1999). Claiming a Continent: a History of Australia. Angus & Robertson. ISBN 9780207190629.
- Smith, David (2005). Head of State: the Governor-general, the Monarchy, the Republic and the Dismissal. Macleay Press. ISBN 9781876492151.
- Twomey, Anne (2006). The Chameleon Crown: the Queen and her Australian Governors. Leichhardt, NSW: Federation Press. ISBN 978-186287-629-3.
- Whitlam, Gough (2005). The Truth of the Matter: His Powerful Account of the Dismissal. Melbourne University Press.
- Whittington, Don (1966). "The Liberal Party and the Monarchy". In Geoffrey Dutton (ed.). Australia and the Monarchy: a Symposium. Melbourne: Sun Books.
