= History of the monarchy of the United Kingdom =

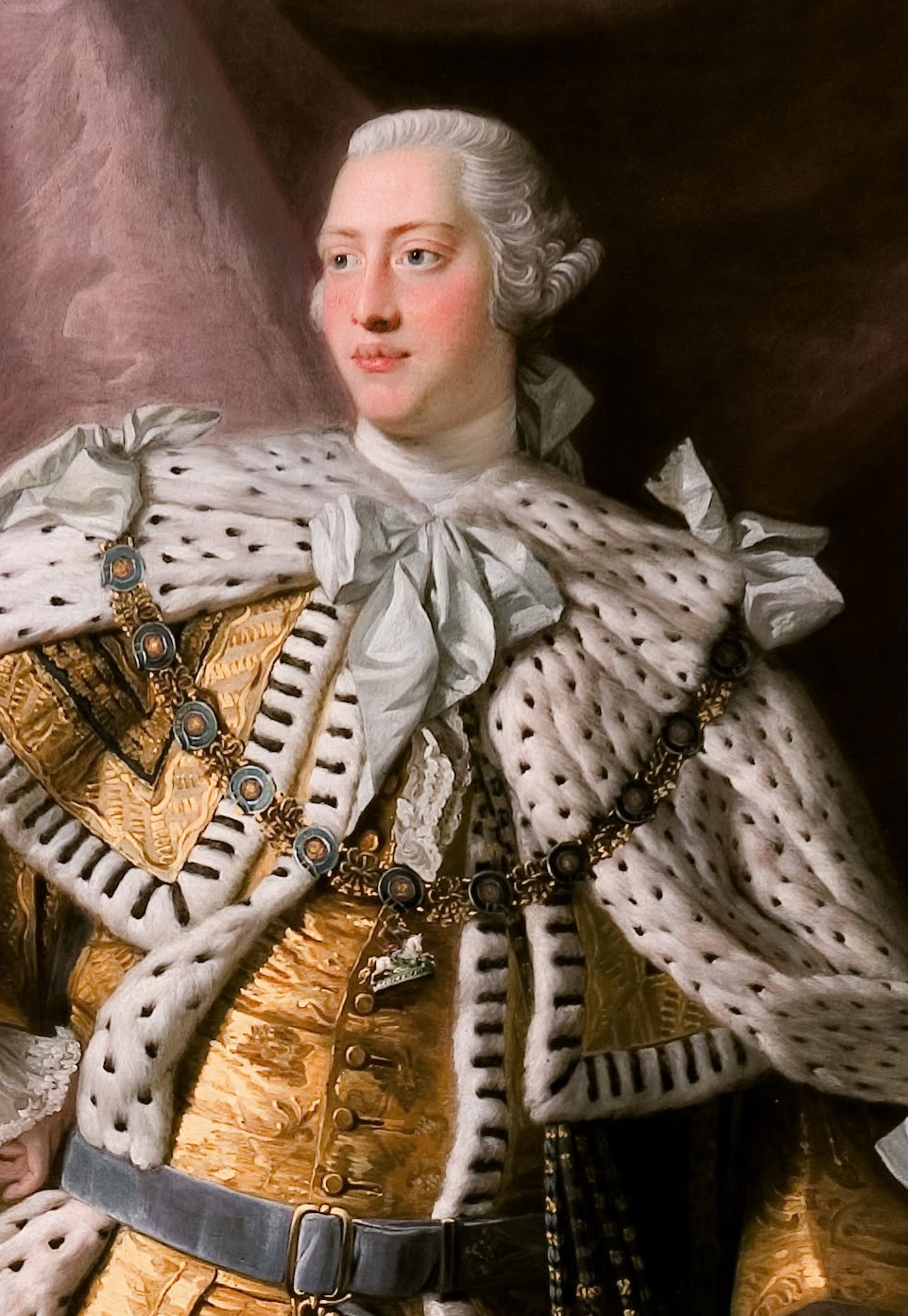
King George III, during whose reign in 1801 Great Britain and Ireland unified into the United Kingdom

The history of the monarchy of the United Kingdom and its evolution into a constitutional and ceremonial monarchy is a major theme in the historical development of the British constitution. The British monarchy traces its origins to the petty kingdoms of Anglo-Saxon England and early medieval Scotland, which consolidated into the kingdoms of England and Scotland by the 10th century. The Norman and Plantagenet dynasties expanded their authority throughout the British Isles, creating the Lordship of Ireland in 1177 and conquering Wales in 1283. In 1215, King John agreed to limit his own powers over his subjects according to the terms of Magna Carta. To gain the consent of the political community, English kings began summoning Parliaments to approve taxation and to enact statutes. Gradually, Parliament's authority expanded at the expense of royal power.

The Crown of Ireland Act 1542 granted English monarchs the title King of Ireland. From 1603, the English and Scottish kingdoms were ruled by a single sovereign in the Union of the Crowns. During the Interregnum (1649–1660), the monarchy was abolished and replaced with various forms of republican government before ultimately being restored in 1660. Following the installation of William III and Mary II as co-monarchs in the Glorious Revolution, a constitutional monarchy was established with power shifting to Parliament. The Bill of Rights 1689, and its Scottish counterpart the Claim of Right Act 1689, further curtailed the power of the monarchy and excluded Roman Catholics from succession to the throne.

In 1707, England and Scotland merged to create the Kingdom of Great Britain. In 1801, the Kingdom of Ireland joined to create the United Kingdom of Great Britain and Ireland. The British monarch was the nominal head of the vast British Empire.

The Balfour Declaration of 1926 recognised the evolution of the Dominions of the Empire into separate, self-governing countries within a Commonwealth of Nations. In the years after the Second World War, a majority of British colonies and territories became independent, effectively bringing the Empire to an end. The monarchs then adopted the title Head of the Commonwealth as a symbol of the free association of its independent member states. The United Kingdom and fourteen other independent sovereign states that share the same monarch are called Commonwealth realms. Although the monarch is shared, each country is sovereign and independent of the others, and the monarch has a different, specific, and official national title and style for each realm.

== English monarchy ==
=== Anglo-Saxon period (800s–1066) ===
By 865, Viking invaders had conquered all of the Anglo-Saxon kingdoms except Wessex, which survived under the rule of Alfred the Great (r. 871–899). Alfred's son Edward the Elder (r. 899–924) and grandson Æthelstan (r. 924–939) gradually expanded and consolidated their control over the rest of England. Æthelstan first adopted the title "king of the English" and is considered the founder of the English monarchy.

While the king theoretically held all governing authority, he relied on the support of the English church and nobility to govern. The king's council or witan advised the king and also played a role in electing new monarchs. Succession was not strictly based on primogeniture, leading to complex successions and power struggles. Royal revenue came from various sources including the royal demesne, judicial fines, and geld (land tax).

By the time of Edward the Confessor (r. 1042–1066), Anglo-Saxon government had become sophisticated. The treasury had developed into a permanent institution, and Edward appointed the first chancellor. Nevertheless, he faced challenges from the powerful Godwinson family, leading to political turmoil.

After Edward's death, there were competing claims to the English throne. Harold Godwinson was crowned king, but he faced challenges from Duke William of Normandy and King Harald Hardrada of Norway. Following a series of battles, including the famous Battle of Hastings, William emerged victorious, leading to his coronation as King of England on Christmas Day in 1066.

=== House of Normandy (1066–1154) ===
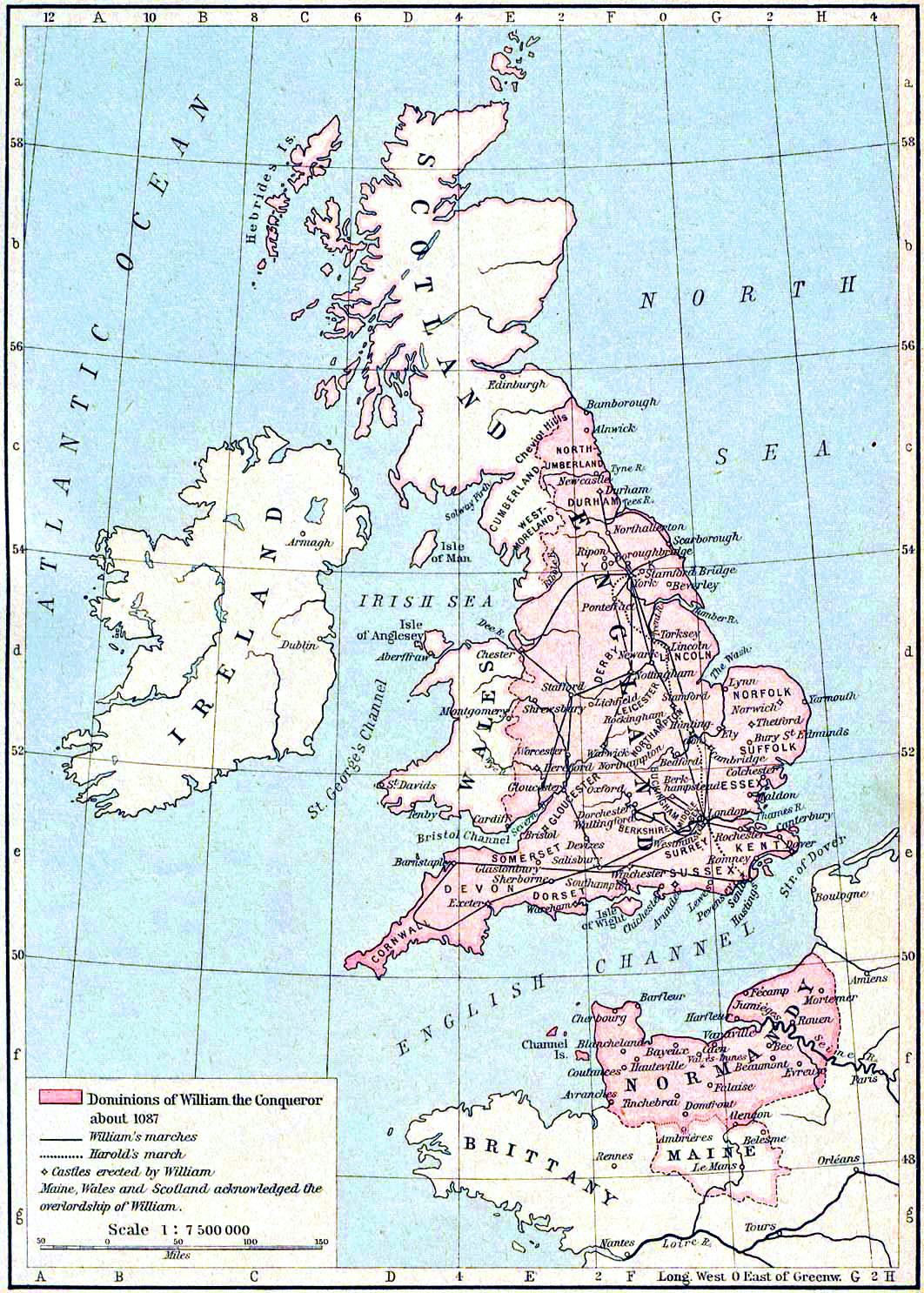
England and Normandy in 1087

After the Norman Conquest, the English monarchy became closely intertwined with French politics and the kings of England were nominal vassals to the kings of France. The king claimed ownership of all land, and the estates of the old Anglo-Saxon nobility were confiscated and redistributed to French-speaking Anglo-Normans according to the principles of feudalism. The Normans maintained the basic system of English government. The witan's role of consultation and advice was filled by the curia regis ('king's court') and magnum concilium ('great council').

The Normans introduced new practices such as royal forests and forest law, which limited the rights of landholders within those areas. The Normans built defensive castles across the country. William the Conqueror (r. 1066–1087) ordered the construction of the White Tower, the central keep of the Tower of London, which became an imposing symbol of the monarch's power.

The Conqueror was succeeded by his sons, William II (r. 1087–1100) and Henry I (r. 1100–1135). The latter formalized the royal household, established the office of chief justiciar, and made royal justice more accessible. His marriage to Matilda of Scotland united the House of Normandy with the House of Wessex. A succession crisis arose when William Adelin, the King's only legitimate son, died. Henry chose his daughter Empress Matilda as his heir, sparking controversy and forcing the nobility to swear oaths of allegiance to her.

Despite the oaths sworn to her, Matilda was unpopular both for being a woman and because of her marriage ties to Anjou, Normandy's traditional enemy. Following Henry's death in 1135, his nephew, Stephen of Blois (r. 1135–1154), laid claim to the throne and took power with the support of most of the barons. Matilda challenged his reign; as a result, England descended into a period of civil war known as the Anarchy (1138–1153). While Stephen maintained a precarious hold on power, he was ultimately forced to compromise for the sake of peace. Both sides agreed to the Treaty of Wallingford by which Stephen adopted Matilda's son, Henry FitzEmpress, as his son and heir.

=== Angevins (1154–1216) ===
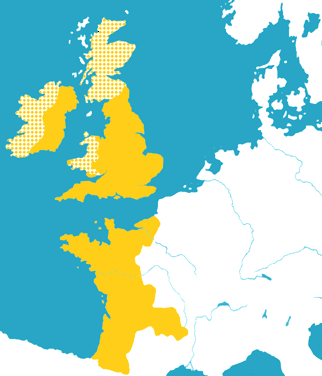
The Angevin Empire during the reign of Henry II

Henry II (r. 1154–1189) implemented legal reforms that became the foundation of England's common law legal system. He also invaded Wales, forced William the Lion of Scotland to acknowledge him as a feudal overlord, and confirmed his feudal overlordship over most of Ireland. Additionally, Henry's clash with Thomas Becket, the archbishop of Canterbury, in the Becket controversy foreshadowed the ongoing struggle between secular and ecclesiastical powers.

Henry was succeeded by his son, Richard I (r. 1189–1199), also known as the Lionheart. He joined the Third Crusade and spent most of his reign outside of England. His absence from the country led to power struggles and opposition against his appointed regent, William de Longchamp. While returning from the Crusade, Richard was imprisoned by the Holy Roman Emperor and had to pay a substantial ransom for his release. His brother John defected to France and plotted to take Richard's lands on the Continent. After his return to England, Richard waged war against Philip II of France. Despite reclaiming most of his territory, Richard died from wounds sustained in battle in 1199, naming John as his successor before his death. Eleanor and Arthur children of John's late elder brother Geoffrey II, Duke of Brittany were passed over; later John had Arthur murdered, and Eleanor was imprisoned until her death in 1241, with her claim only posthumously recognized.

John (r. 1199–1216) faced significant challenges, including the loss of Normandy, financial struggles, and conflicts with the barons and the English church. His attempts to fund military campaigns through taxation and other means led to resentment and distrust among the barons. In 1215, the barons forced John to agree to Magna Carta, which aimed to define and limit royal power. John's attempts to annul Magna Carta led to the First Barons' War, which was ongoing at his sudden death in 1216.

=== Plantagenets (1216–1399) ===
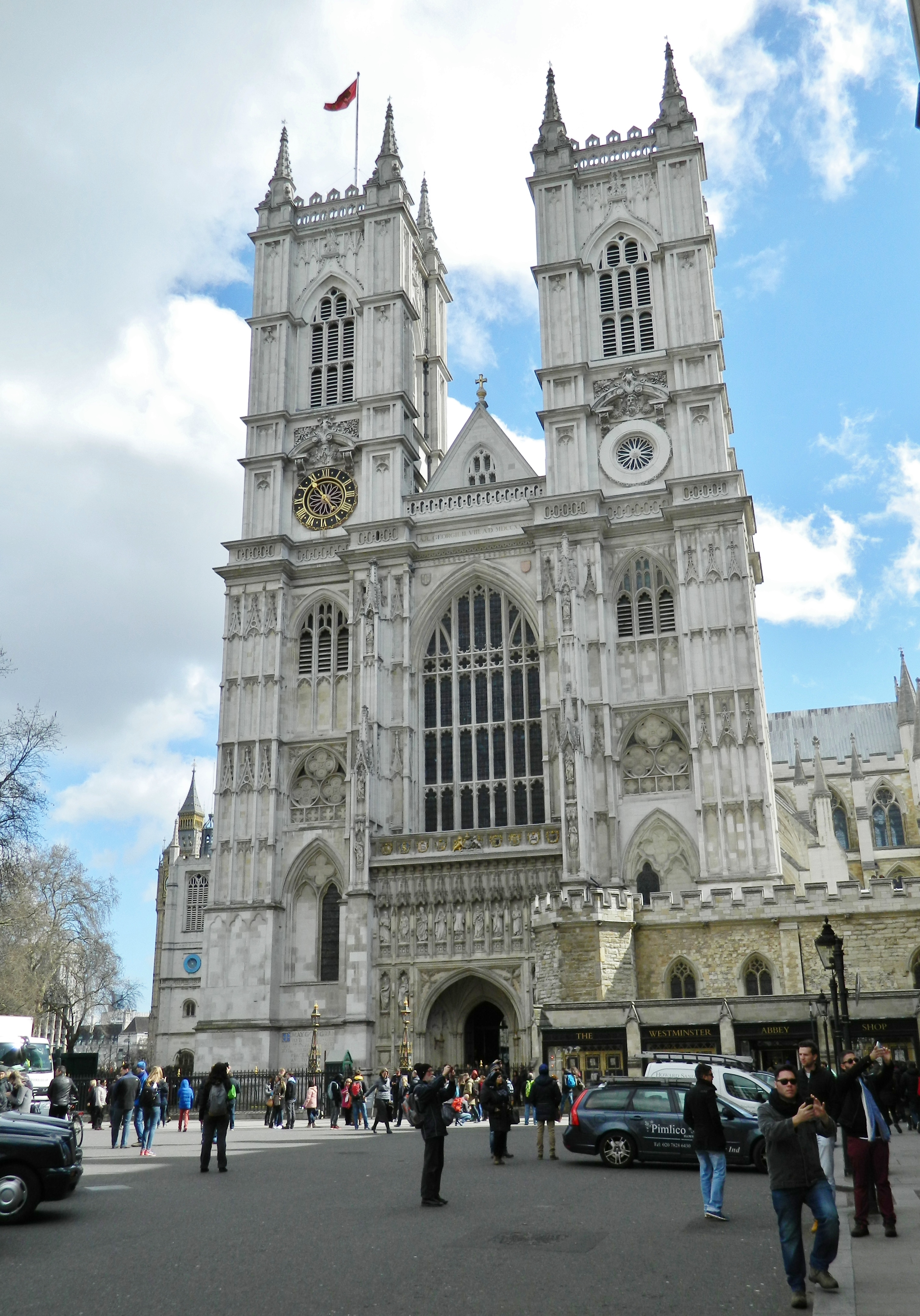
Since the Conquest, monarchs have been crowned at Westminster Abbey. Construction of the present church began in 1245 on the orders of Henry III.

During Henry III's reign (1216–1272), the concept that kings were bound by the law gained traction. This era saw the development of the English Parliament, which claimed the power to grant taxes. In exchange for funding military campaigns in France, Parliament gained concessions of political liberties from the King. Henry was often influenced by foreign favourites, which led to power struggles and resentment, ultimately resulting in widespread consensus that Henry was unfit to rule. In 1258, the King was forced to comply with the Provisions of Oxford, transferring royal power to a council of barons. Henry's attempts to overturn the provisions led to the Second Barons' War, which ended with the King's victory and the restoration of royal authority. Henry's reign was also marked by extravagant spending on royal palaces and Westminster Abbey.

Edward I (r. 1272–1307) initiated a number of reforms through parliamentary statute, summoned the Model Parliament in 1295, and effectively convinced Parliament to finance military campaigns in Wales and Scotland. Edward permanently conquered Wales and enforced English domination with the Statute of Wales. His intervention in the Scottish succession dispute ultimately led to the First War of Scottish Independence. Edward died in 1307 while on his way to invade Scotland.

During the reign of Edward II (1307–1327), conflicts arose between the King and the nobility, largely due to the influence of royal favourites. The King also refused to adhere to the Ordinances of 1311, which aimed to limit the monarch's power. These tensions led to a series of events including the exile and eventual execution of the king's favorite, Piers Gaveston, and later the rise of Hugh Despenser the Younger, who further destabilized the kingdom. In the midst of this turmoil, Edward's wife, Isabella, formed an alliance with Roger Mortimer, leading to Edward's capture and subsequent abdication in 1327, marking the first formal deposition of an English monarch.

Edward III added the French fleur-de-lis to the Royal Arms of England to symbolise his claim to the French throne

Edward III (r. 1327–1377) succeeded his father at age 14, but his mother Isabella and Mortimer actually ruled the country. In 1330, the 17-year-old Edward staged a coup and took control of the government. In 1340, Edward claimed the French throne on the grounds that he was the last male descendant of his grandfather, Philip IV of France. This was the start of the Hundred Years' War. Edward had important military successes, including the Battle of Crécy and the capture of Calais. Towards the end of his reign, setbacks arose, including the loss of Aquitaine. The Good Parliament of 1376 highlighted corruption in the government, leading to the first impeachment of ministers and the removal of Alice Perrers, the royal mistress. Despite these challenges, Edward's reign strengthened Parliament's role in government.

Richard II (r. 1377–1399) became king at the age of 10; however, actual power was held by his uncles and courtiers. Richard's decisive leadership during the Peasants' Revolt showed he was ready to assume power, but his tyrannical rule bred discontent. In 1399, Henry Bolingbroke, the King's cousin, led a rebellion that forced Richard to abdicate. On 30 September, a convention parliament declared Richard deposed and Bolingbroke claimed the vacant throne for himself. While Edward II abdicated in favor of his son, Parliament deliberately broke the line of succession when it deposed Richard. Historian Tracy Borman writes that this "created a dangerous precedent and made the crown fundamentally unstable."

=== House of Lancaster (1399–1461) ===
France in 1435 during the Hundred Years War

Bolingbroke, now Henry IV (r. 1399–1413), faced numerous challenges, including rebellions and plots to restore Richard to the throne. His reign was marked by the Welsh Revolt, the Battle of Shrewsbury, financial difficulties, and the Armagnac–Burgundian Civil War in France.

King Henry V (r. 1413–1422) sought to unify England by making conciliatory gestures towards his father's enemies and honoring the deceased Richard II. His reign was largely free from domestic strife, allowing him to focus on the last phase of the Hundred Years' War with France. Henry's legendary victory at the Battle of Agincourt in 1415 boosted national pride, and he continued to achieve military success, conquering Normandy in 1419 and being recognized as heir and regent of France in 1420 as part of the Treaty of Troyes. Despite his popularity and successful reign, difficulty securing further funds for wars in France and his frequent absences from England created challenges. Henry V died in 1422 during a campaign in France, leaving behind his nine-month-old son, Henry VI (1st r. 1422–1461; 2nd r. 1470–1471), to rule the dual monarchy of England and France.

Henry VI proved to be a weak and incompetent ruler. By 1453, he had lost all his French territories except Calais. Following the French conquest of Gascony, the King suffered a mental breakdown. Parliament appointed Richard, duke of York, as lord protector. York and Queen Margaret of Anjou engaged in a power struggle that started the Wars of the Roses (1455–1487). York claimed the throne as a descendant of Edward III's son Lionel, duke of Clarence. York's son, Edward IV, defeated the Lancastrians and was crowned in 1461. Henry and Margaret fled to Scotland with their son, Edward of Westminster.

=== House of York (1461–1485) ===
Edward IV was constantly at odds with the Lancastrians and his own councillors after his marriage to Elizabeth Woodville, with a brief return to power for Henry VI. Edward IV prevailed, winning back the throne at Barnet and killing the Lancastrian heir, Edward of Westminster, at Tewkesbury. Afterward he captured Margaret of Anjou, eventually sending her into exile, but not before killing Henry VI while he was held prisoner in the Tower. The Wars of the Roses, nevertheless, continued intermittently during his reign and those of his son Edward V and brother Richard III. Edward V disappeared, presumably murdered by Richard. Ultimately, the conflict culminated in success for the Lancastrian branch led by Henry Tudor, in 1485, when Richard III was killed in the Battle of Bosworth Field.

=== Tudors (1485–1603) ===
King Henry VII then neutralised the remaining Yorkist forces, partly by marrying Elizabeth of York, a Yorkist heir. Through skill and ability, Henry re-established absolute supremacy in the realm, and the conflicts with the nobility that had plagued previous monarchs came to an end. The reign of the second Tudor king, Henry VIII, was one of great political change. Religious upheaval and disputes with the Pope, and the fact that his marriage to Catherine of Aragon produced only one surviving child, a daughter, led the monarch to break from the Roman Catholic Church and to establish the Church of England (the Anglican Church) and divorce his wife to marry Anne Boleyn.

In 1155, Pope Adrian IV issued the papal bull Laudabiliter, granting Henry II authority over Ireland. Since then, all English kings claimed dominion over Ireland, using the title Lord of Ireland. Few kings ever visited the island, however. They preferred to rule through lieutenants for Ireland. By 1541, King Henry VIII of England had broken with the Church of Rome and declared himself Supreme Head of the Church of England. The pope's grant of Ireland to the English monarch became invalid, so Henry summoned a meeting of the Irish Parliament to change his title from Lord of Ireland to King of Ireland. Wales – which had been conquered centuries earlier, but had remained a separate dominion – was annexed to England under the Laws in Wales Acts 1535 and 1542.

Henry VIII's son and successor, the young Edward VI, continued with further religious reforms, but his early death in 1553 precipitated a succession crisis. He was wary of allowing his Catholic elder half-sister Mary I to succeed, and therefore drew up a will designating Lady Jane Grey as his heiress. Jane's reign, however, lasted only nine days; with tremendous popular support, Mary deposed her and declared herself the lawful sovereign. Mary I married Philip of Spain, who was declared king and co-ruler. He pursued disastrous wars in France and she attempted to return England to Roman Catholicism (burning Protestants at the stake as heretics in the process). Upon her death in 1558, the pair were succeeded by her Protestant half-sister Elizabeth I. England returned to Protestantism and continued its growth into a major world power by building its navy and exploring the New World.

== Scottish monarchy ==
In Scotland, as in England, monarchies emerged after the withdrawal of the Roman empire from Britain in the early fifth century. The three groups that lived in Scotland at this time were the Picts in the north east, the Britons in the south, including the Kingdom of Strathclyde, and the Gaels or Scotti (who would later give their name to Scotland), of the Irish petty kingdom of Dál Riata in the west. Kenneth MacAlpin is traditionally viewed as the first king of a united Scotland (known as Scotia to writers in Latin, or Alba to the Scots). The expansion of Scottish dominions continued over the next two centuries, as other territories such as Strathclyde were absorbed.

Early Scottish monarchs did not inherit the Crown directly; instead, the custom of tanistry was followed, where the monarchy alternated between different branches of the House of Alpin. As a result, however, the rival dynastic lines clashed, often violently. From 942 to 1005, seven consecutive monarchs were either murdered or killed in battle. In 1005, Malcolm II ascended the throne having killed many rivals. He continued to ruthlessly eliminate opposition, and when he died in 1034 he was succeeded by his grandson, Duncan I, instead of a cousin, as had been usual. In 1040, Duncan suffered defeat in battle at the hands of Macbeth, who was killed himself in 1057 by Duncan's son Malcolm. The following year, after killing Macbeth's stepson Lulach, Malcolm ascended the throne as Malcolm III.

With a further series of battles and deposings, five of Malcolm's sons as well as one of his brothers successively became king. Eventually, the Crown came to his youngest son, David I. David was succeeded by his grandsons Malcolm IV, and then by William the Lion, the longest-reigning King of Scots before the Union of the Crowns. William participated in a rebellion against King Henry II of England but when the rebellion failed, William was captured by the English. In exchange for his release, William was forced to acknowledge Henry as his feudal overlord. The English King Richard I agreed to terminate the arrangement in 1189, in return for a large sum of money needed for the Crusades. William died in 1214, and was succeeded by his son Alexander II. Alexander II, as well as his successor Alexander III, attempted to take over the Western Isles, which were still under the overlordship of Norway. During the reign of Alexander III, Norway launched an unsuccessful invasion of Scotland; the ensuing Treaty of Perth recognised Scottish control of the Western Isles and other disputed areas.

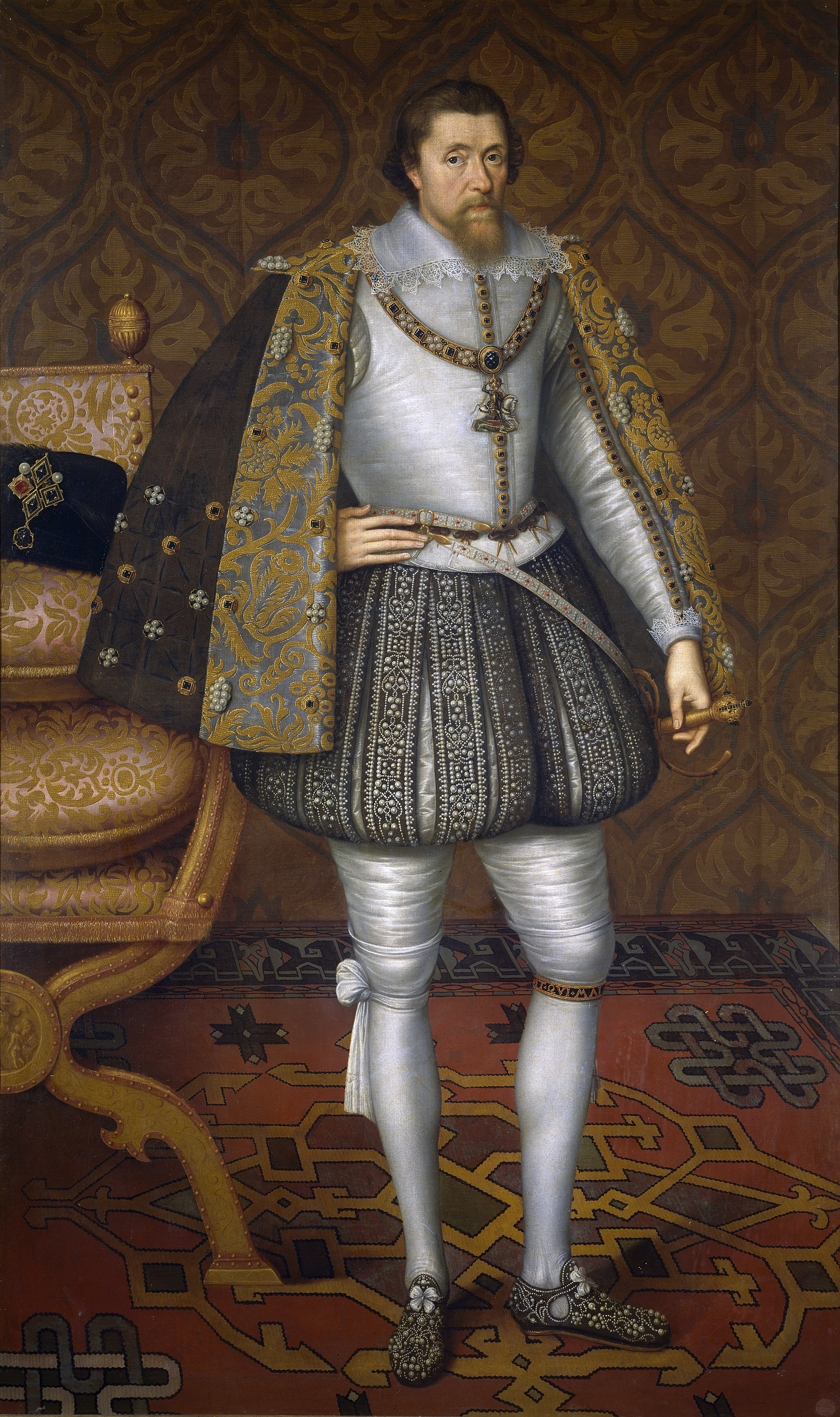
In 1603, James VI and I became the first monarch to rule over England, Scotland, and Ireland together.

Alexander III's death in a riding accident in 1286 precipitated a major succession crisis. Scottish leaders appealed to King Edward I of England for help in determining who was the rightful heir. Edward chose Alexander's three-year-old Norwegian granddaughter, Margaret. On her way to Scotland in 1290, however, Margaret died at sea, and Edward was again asked to adjudicate between 13 rival claimants to the throne. A court was set up and after two years of deliberation, it pronounced John Balliol to be king. Edward proceeded to treat Balliol as a vassal, and tried to exert influence over Scotland. In 1295, when Balliol renounced his allegiance to England, Edward I invaded. During the first ten years of the ensuing Wars of Scottish Independence, Scotland had no monarch, until Robert the Bruce declared himself king in 1306.

Robert's efforts to control Scotland culminated in success, and Scottish independence was acknowledged in 1328. However, only one year later, Robert died and was succeeded by his five-year-old son, David II. On the pretext of restoring John Balliol's rightful heir, Edward Balliol, the English again invaded in 1332. During the next four years, Balliol was crowned, deposed, restored, deposed, restored, and deposed until he eventually settled in England, and David remained king for the next 35 years.

David II died childless in 1371 and was succeeded by his nephew Robert II of the House of Stuart. The reigns of both Robert II and his successor, Robert III, were marked by a general decline in royal power. When Robert III died in 1406, regents had to rule the country; the monarch, Robert III's son James I, had been taken captive by the English. Having paid a large ransom, James returned to Scotland in 1424; to restore his authority, he used ruthless measures, including the execution of several of his enemies. He was assassinated by a group of nobles. James II continued his father's policies by subduing influential noblemen but he was killed in an accident at the age of thirty, and a council of regents again assumed power. James III was defeated in a battle against rebellious Scottish earls in 1488, leading to another boy-king: James IV.

In 1513 James IV launched an invasion of England, attempting to take advantage of the absence of the English King Henry VIII. His forces met with disaster at Flodden Field; the King, many senior noblemen, and hundreds of soldiers were killed. As his son and successor, James V, was an infant, the government was again taken over by regents. James V led another disastrous war with the English in 1542, and his death in the same year left the Crown in the hands of his six-day-old daughter, Mary. Once again, a regency was established.

Mary, a Roman Catholic, reigned during a period of great religious upheaval in Scotland. As a result of the efforts of reformers such as John Knox, a Protestant ascendancy was established. Mary caused alarm by marrying her Catholic cousin, Lord Darnley, in 1565. After Lord Darnley's assassination in 1567, Mary contracted an even more unpopular marriage with the Earl of Bothwell, who was widely suspected of Darnley's murder. The nobility rebelled against the Queen, forcing her to abdicate. She fled to England, and the Crown went to her infant son James VI, who was brought up as a Protestant. Mary was imprisoned and later executed by the English queen Elizabeth I.

== Personal union (1603–1707) ==
=== Early Stuarts (1603–1649) ===
Elizabeth I's death in 1603 ended Tudor rule in England. Since she had no children, she was succeeded by the Scottish monarch James VI, who was the great-grandson of Henry VIII's older sister and hence Elizabeth's first cousin twice removed. James VI ruled in England as James I after what was known as the "Union of the Crowns". Although England and Scotland were in personal union under one monarch – James I & VI became the first monarch to style himself "King of Great Britain" in 1604 – they remained two separate kingdoms. James I & VI's successor, Charles I, experienced frequent conflicts with the English Parliament related to the issue of royal and parliamentary powers, especially the power to impose taxes. He provoked opposition by ruling without Parliament from 1629 to 1640, unilaterally levying taxes and adopting controversial religious policies (many of which were offensive to the Scottish Presbyterians and the English Puritans). His attempt to enforce Anglicanism led to organised rebellion in Scotland (the "Bishops' Wars") and ignited the Wars of the Three Kingdoms. In 1642, the conflict between the King and English Parliament reached its climax and the English Civil War began.

=== Interregnum (1649–1660) ===
The Civil War culminated in the execution of the king in 1649, the overthrow of the English monarchy, and the establishment of the Commonwealth of England. Charles I's son, Charles II, was proclaimed King of Great Britain in Scotland, but he was forced to flee abroad after he invaded England and was defeated at the Battle of Worcester. In 1653, Oliver Cromwell, the most prominent military and political leader in the nation, seized power and declared himself Lord Protector (effectively becoming a military dictator, but refusing the title of king). Cromwell ruled until his death in 1658, when he was succeeded by his son Richard. The new Lord Protector had little interest in governing; he soon resigned. The lack of clear leadership led to civil and military unrest, and to a popular desire to restore the monarchy. In 1660, the monarchy was restored and Charles II returned to Britain.

=== Later Stuarts (1660–1714) ===
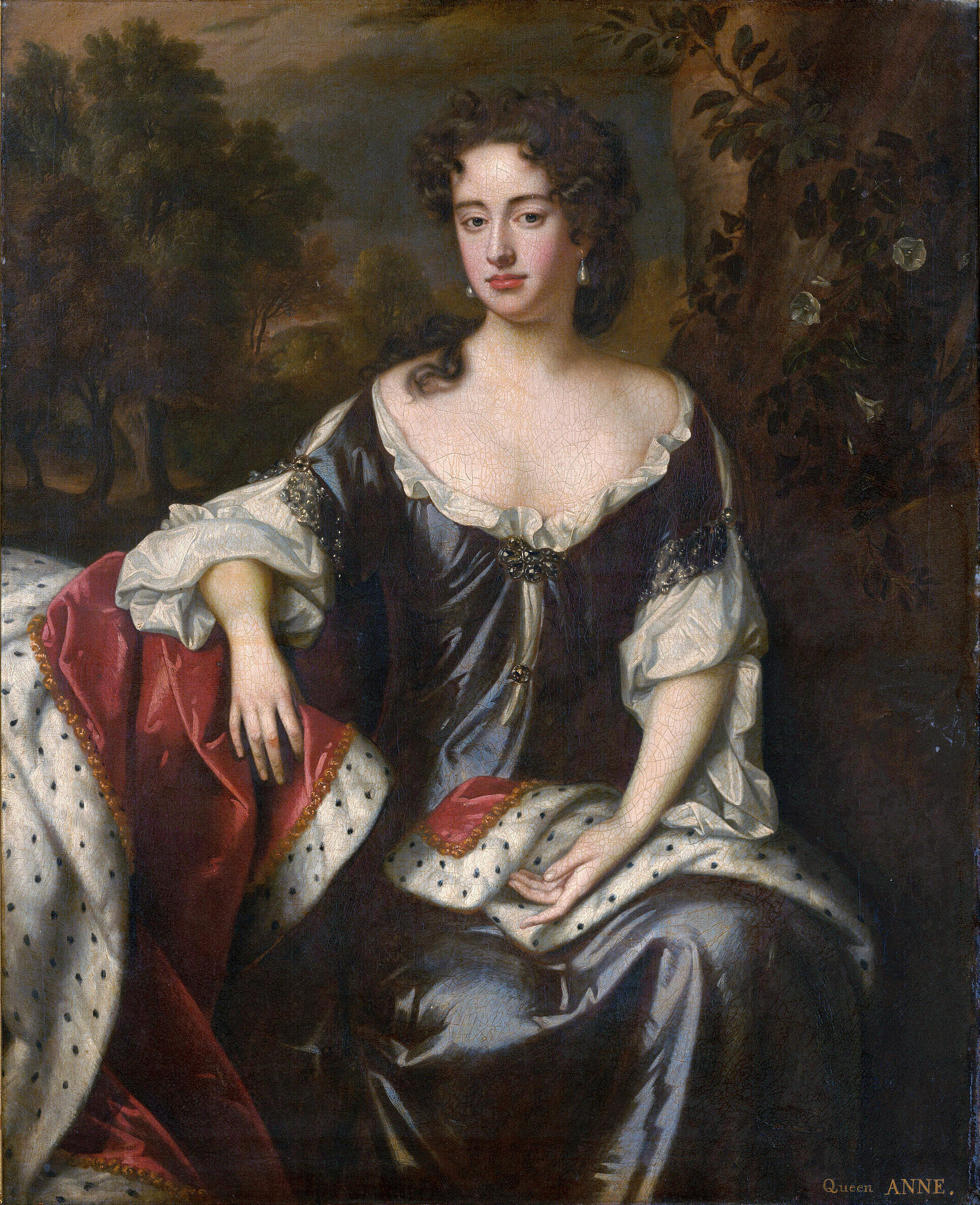
England and Scotland were united as the Kingdom of Great Britain under Queen Anne in 1707.

Charles II's reign was marked by the development of the first modern political parties in England. Charles had no legitimate children, and was due to be succeeded by his Roman Catholic brother, James, Duke of York. A parliamentary effort to exclude James from the line of succession arose; the "Petitioners", who supported exclusion, became the Whig Party, whereas the "Abhorrers", who opposed exclusion, became the Tory Party. The Exclusion Bill failed; on several occasions, Charles II dissolved Parliament because he feared that the bill might pass. After the dissolution of the Parliament of 1681, Charles ruled without a Parliament until his death in 1685. When James succeeded Charles, he pursued a policy of offering religious tolerance to Roman Catholics, thereby drawing the ire of many of his Protestant subjects. Many opposed James's decisions to maintain a large standing army, to appoint Roman Catholics to high political and military offices, and to imprison Church of England clerics who challenged his policies. As a result, a group of Protestants known as the Immortal Seven invited James II & VII's daughter Mary and her husband William III of Orange to depose the king. William obliged, arriving in England on 5 November 1688 to great public support. Faced with the defection of many of his Protestant officials, James fled the realm and William and Mary (rather than James II & VII's Catholic son) were declared joint Sovereigns of England, Scotland and Ireland.

James's overthrow, known as the Glorious Revolution, was one of the most important events in the long evolution of parliamentary power. The Bill of Rights 1689 affirmed parliamentary supremacy, and declared that the English people held certain rights, including the freedom from taxes imposed without parliamentary consent. The Bill of Rights required future monarchs to be Protestants, and provided that, after any children of William and Mary, Mary's sister Anne would inherit the Crown. Mary II died childless in 1694, leaving William III & II as the sole monarch. By 1700, a political crisis arose, as all of Anne's children had died, leaving her as the only individual left in the line of succession. Parliament was afraid that the former James II or his supporters, known as Jacobites, might attempt to reclaim the throne. Parliament passed the Act of Settlement 1701, which excluded James and his Catholic relations from the succession and made William's nearest Protestant relations, the family of Sophia, Electress of Hanover, next in line to the throne after his sister-in-law Anne. Soon after the passage of the Act, William III & II died, leaving the Crown to Anne.

After Anne's accession, the problem of the succession re-emerged. The Scottish Parliament, infuriated that the English Parliament did not consult them on the choice of Sophia's family as the next heirs, passed the Act of Security 1704, threatening to end the personal union between England and Scotland. The Parliament of England retaliated with the Alien Act 1705, threatening to devastate the Scottish economy by restricting trade. The Scottish and English parliaments negotiated the Acts of Union 1707, under which England and Scotland were united into a single Kingdom of Great Britain, with succession under the rules prescribed by the Act of Settlement.

== Hanoverians (1714–1901) ==
In 1714, Queen Anne was succeeded by her second cousin, and Sophia's son, George I, Elector of Hanover, who consolidated his position by defeating Jacobite rebellions in 1715 and 1719. The new monarch was less active in government than many of his British predecessors, but retained control over his German kingdoms, with which Britain was now in personal union. Power shifted towards George's ministers, especially to Sir Robert Walpole, who is often considered the first British prime minister, although the title was not then in use. The next monarch, George II, witnessed the final end of the Jacobite threat in 1746, when the Catholic Stuarts were completely defeated. During the long reign of his grandson, George III, Britain's American colonies were lost, the former colonies having formed the United States of America, but British influence elsewhere in the world continued to grow, and the United Kingdom of Great Britain and Ireland was created by the Acts of Union 1800.

From 1811 to 1820, George III suffered a severe bout of what is now believed to be porphyria, an illness rendering him incapable of ruling. His son, the future George IV, ruled in his stead as Prince Regent. During the Regency and his own reign, the power of the monarchy declined, and by the time of his successor, William IV, the monarch was no longer able to effectively interfere with parliamentary power. In 1834, William dismissed the Whig Prime Minister, William Lamb, 2nd Viscount Melbourne, and appointed a Tory, Sir Robert Peel. In the ensuing elections, however, Peel lost. The king had no choice but to recall Lord Melbourne. During William IV's reign, the Reform Act 1832, which reformed parliamentary representation, was passed. Together with others passed later in the century, the Act led to an expansion of the electoral franchise and the rise of the House of Commons as the most important branch of Parliament.

The final transition to a constitutional monarchy was made during the long reign of William IV's successor, Victoria. As a woman, Victoria could not rule Hanover, which only permitted succession in the male line, so the personal union of the United Kingdom and Hanover came to an end. The Victorian era was marked by great cultural change, technological progress, and the establishment of the United Kingdom as one of the world's foremost powers. In recognition of British rule over India, Victoria was declared Empress of India in 1876. However, her reign was also marked by increased support for the republican movement, due in part to Victoria's permanent mourning and lengthy period of seclusion following the death of her husband in 1861.

== Windsors (1901–present) ==
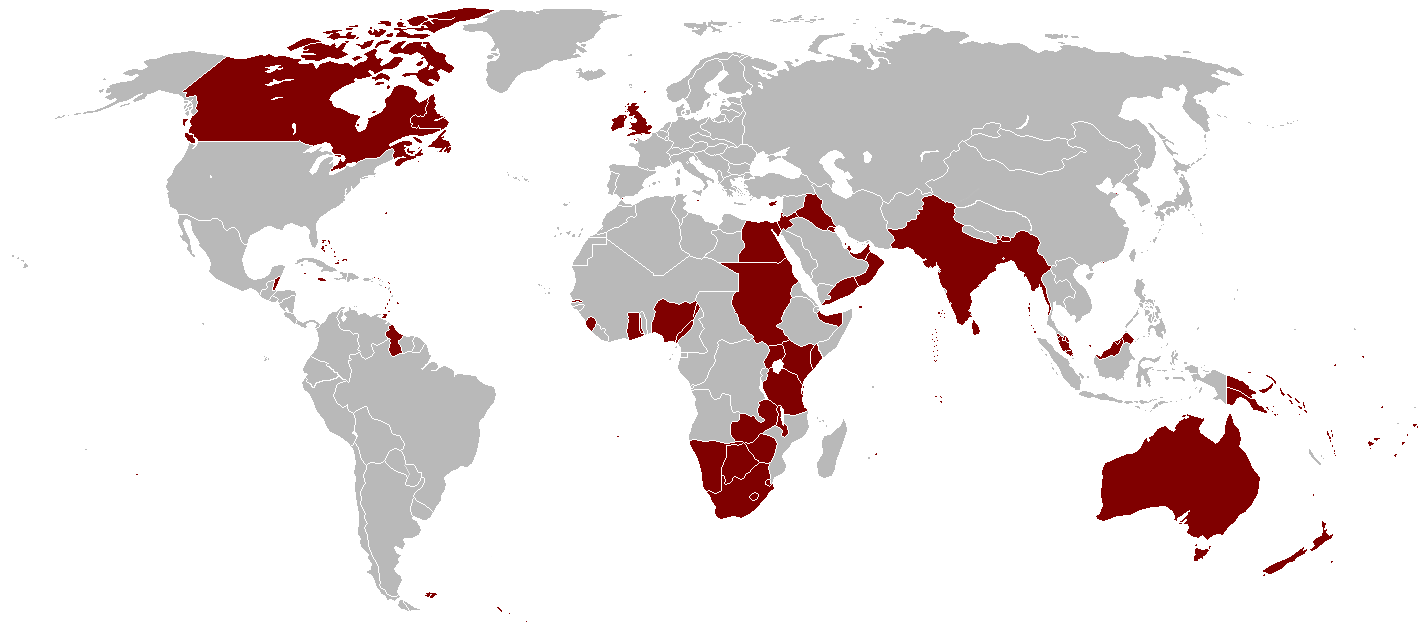
Map of the British Empire in 1921

Victoria's son, Edward VII, became the first monarch of the House of Saxe-Coburg and Gotha in 1901. In 1910, the next monarch, George V, changed "Saxe-Coburg and Gotha" to "Windsor" in response to the anti-German sympathies aroused by the First World War. George V's reign was marked by the separation of Ireland into Northern Ireland, which remained a part of the United Kingdom, and the Irish Free State, an independent nation, in 1922.

Current Commonwealth realms Territories, dependencies and associated states of current realms Former Commonwealth realms and Dominions that are now republics

During the twentieth century, the Commonwealth of Nations evolved from the British Empire. Prior to 1926, the British Crown reigned over the British Empire collectively; the Dominions and Crown Colonies were subordinate to the United Kingdom. The Balfour Declaration of 1926 gave complete self-government to the Dominions, effectively creating a system whereby a single monarch operated independently in each separate Dominion. The concept was solidified by the Statute of Westminster 1931, which has been likened to "a treaty among the Commonwealth countries".

The monarchy thus ceased to be an exclusively British institution, although it is often still referred to as "British" for legal and historical reasons and for convenience. The monarch became separately monarch of the United Kingdom, Canada, Australia, New Zealand, and so forth. The independent states within the Commonwealth would share the same monarch in a relationship likened to a personal union.

George V's death in 1936 was followed by the accession of Edward VIII, who caused a public scandal by announcing his desire to marry the divorced American Wallis Simpson, even though the Church of England opposed the remarriage of divorcees. Accordingly, Edward announced his intention to abdicate; the Parliaments of the United Kingdom and of other Commonwealth countries granted his request. Edward VIII and any children by his new wife were excluded from the line of succession, and the Crown went to his brother, George VI. George served as a rallying figure for the British people during World War II, making morale-boosting visits to the troops as well as to munitions factories and to areas bombed by Nazi Germany. In June 1948 George VI relinquished the title Emperor of India, although remaining head of state of the Dominion of India.

At first, every member of the Commonwealth retained the same monarch as the United Kingdom, but when the Dominion of India became a republic in 1950, it would no longer share in a common monarchy. Instead, the British monarch was acknowledged as "Head of the Commonwealth" in all Commonwealth member states, whether they were realms or republics. The position is purely ceremonial, and is not inherited by the British monarch as of right but is vested in an individual chosen by the Commonwealth heads of government. Member states of the Commonwealth that share the same person as monarch are informally known as Commonwealth realms.

In the 1990s, republicanism in the United Kingdom grew, partly on account of negative publicity associated with the Royal Family (for instance, immediately following the death of Diana, Princess of Wales). However, polls from 2002 to 2007 showed that around 70–80% of the British public supported the continuation of the monarchy. This support has remained constant since then—according to a 2018 survey, a majority of the British public across all age groups still support the monarchy's continuation.

== See also ==
- Family tree of British monarchs
- History of monarchy in Australia
- History of monarchy in Canada
- List of British royal residences
- List of English ministries
