= Colonial charters in the Thirteen Colonies =

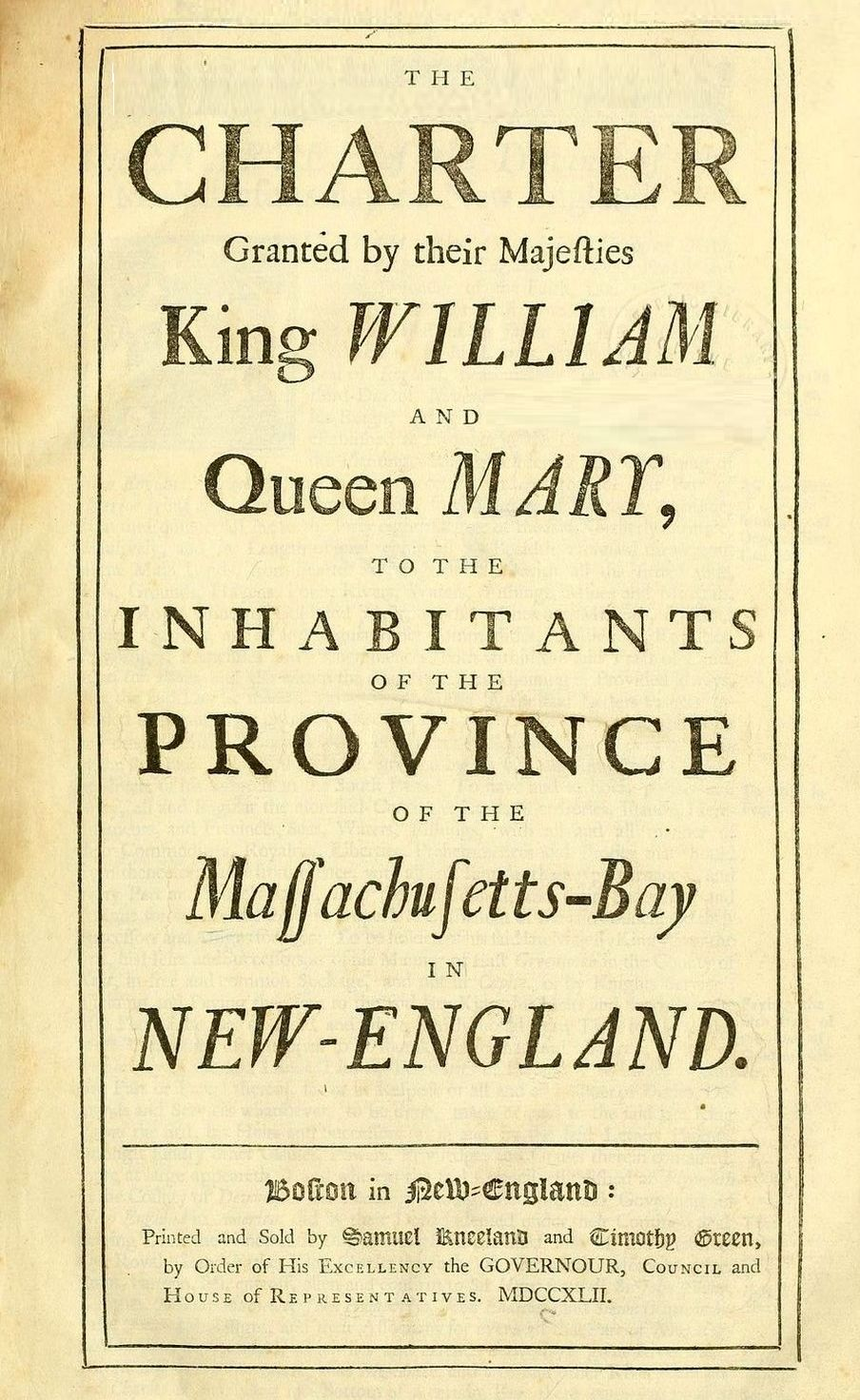
Charter of Massachusetts Bay, 1742

A charter is a document that gives colonies the legal rights to exist. Charters can bestow certain rights on a town, city, university, or other institution.

Colonial charters were approved when the king gave a grant of exclusive powers for the governance of land to proprietors or a settlement company. The charters defined the relationship of the colony to the mother country as free from involvement from the Crown. For the trading companies, charters vested the powers of government in the company in England. The officers would determine the administration, laws, and ordinances for the colony but only as conforming to the laws of England. Proprietary charters gave governing authority to the proprietor, who determined the form of government, chose the officers, and made laws subject to the advice and consent of the freemen. All colonial charters guaranteed to the colonists the vague rights and privileges of Englishmen, which would later cause trouble during the American Revolution. In the second half of the 17th century, the Crown looked upon charters as obstacles to colonial control and substituted the royal colony for corporations and proprietary governments.

== History ==
The Virginia and Massachusetts charters were given to business corporations. Regular meetings of company officers and stockholders were the only governmental institutions required. The Virginia charter, issued in 1606, and revised in 1609 and 1612, was revoked upon bankruptcy of the sponsoring and organizing Virginia Company of London in 1624. The second Colonial Charter was granted to Massachusetts Bay in 1629, settling at Boston and Salem, a decade after the first "New Englanders" at Plymouth Colony further south towards Cape Cod. In 1684, the Chancery Court in England voided the charter and changed the status of the former private colony to a royal colony. Charles II placed Massachusetts under the authority of the unified Dominion of New England in 1685. After William III and Mary II had ascended to the thrones of England, Scotland, and Ireland, in addition to the stewardship of the Dutch Republic, they issued Massachusetts Bay a new liberal charter in 1691.

Charles II granted Connecticut its charter in 1662 with the right of self-government. When James II ascended the throne in 1685, he tried to revoke the Connecticut charter and sent Sir Edmund Andros to receive it for the Crown. Captain Joseph Wadsworth spirited the precious document out a window and stole the charter and hid it in a hollow oak tree, the "Charter Oak," until James was overthrown. Connecticut temporarily lost the right of self-government under the unification of the several colonies into the Dominion of New England in 1687 until it was reinstated 1689. The last charter by Charles II was issued to Rhode Island in 1663. Connecticut and Rhode Island attained colonial charters as already established colonies that allowed them to elect their own governors.

The concept of charters changed as a result of political upheavals, especially after the three English Civil Wars in the 1640s, and the later "Glorious Revolution" of 1688 with their Roman Catholic-Protestant/Anglican conflicts, which also transformed into struggles between the King and Parliament. As the conflicts traveled across the Atlantic Ocean, most colonies eventually surrendered their charters to the Crown by 1763 and became royal colonies, as the King and his Ministers asserted more centralized control of their previously-neglected and autonomous Thirteen Colonies. By the late 1600s, the colonial Maryland had its Proprietary Charter to the Lords Baltimore revoked and had become a royal colony with its Governor of Maryland, appointed by the Monarch, with the advice of his Ministers and the Colonial Offices and Board of Trade of members from Parliament.

By 1776, Pennsylvania and its lower Delaware Bay counties remained proprietary colonies under a charter originally granted to William Penn and his heirs. The Province of Connecticut and the Province of Rhode Island and Providence Plantations continued as corporation colonies under charters, and Massachusetts was governed as a royal province that operated under a charter after the unification of the Massachusetts Bay Colony headquartered in Boston and the "first landing" Plymouth Colony at Plymouth, Massachusetts, with its famous "Mayflower Compact" from 1620. Further south, the Provinces of Virginia, North Carolina, South Carolina, and Georgia to the undefined border with Spanish Florida, all had their original charters dismissed with different opinions about the role and powers and taxing authority between the royal governors and their increasingly-restless and defiant colonial Assemblies. Royal authority reasserted itself and colonies became governed more directly from London with increasing friction as the 18th century progressed to its revolutionary climax.

== See also ==
- Colonial government in the Thirteen Colonies
- Colonial history of the United States
- Proprietary colony
- State constitution (United States)
