= Maryland Provincial Convention =

Historical legislature of Maryland

- Continental Union Flag

Type
- Type: Unicameral

History
- Founded: June 22, 1774
- Disbanded: July 28, 1776
- Succeeded by: Maryland General Assembly

Leadership
- President of the Convention: Thomas Johnson (1774–1775)
- President (later sessions): Samuel Chase (1775–1776)
- Secretary/Clerk: William Paca

Structure
- Authority: Governmental authority in Patriot-controlled territory in Maryland

Meeting place
- Annapolis, Maryland

Constitution
- Maryland Constitution of 1776

The Maryland Provincial Convention (also called The Maryland Convention or the Maryland Provincial Congress), was an extralegal representative assembly that served as the revolutionary government of Maryland during the early stages of the American Revolution. It replaced royal authority and guided the colony's transition from a British province into an independent state. Prominent Marylanders included Thomas Johnson, Samuel Chase, Charles Carroll of Carrollton, William Paca, and John Hanson.

== Background ==
As tensions rose between the Thirteen Colonies and Great Britain, royal authority in Maryland weakened. The colonial Assembly had been dissolved by Governor Robert Eden in 1774, leaving a governance vacuum.

In response, Maryland Patriots organized a series of conventions to coordinate resistance to British policies and assume governing responsibilities. These conventions acted as the de facto government of Maryland before the establishment of a formal state constitution.

== First Convention ==
The First Maryland Convention met in Annapolis on June 22, 1774. Delegates from the colony's counties and towns discussed grievances against Britain, endorsed the Continental Congress, and supported boycotts of British goods. The convention also authorized local committees to enforce the Continental Association and prepare militia forces for defense. Thomas Johnson served as the first president, leading sessions that helped unify revolutionary efforts across the colony.

== Subsequent conventions ==
Maryland held additional conventions in 1775 and 1776 to strengthen governance, organize military defenses, and manage civil affairs. Samuel Chase served as president during the later sessions. These conventions directed Maryland's militias and managed logistics for the war effort prepared for independent governance by drafting a state constitution.

The transition to state government happened on July 28, 1776, the Maryland Provincial Convention adopted the Maryland Constitution of 1776, formally establishing the state's government and ending the extralegal convention system. The newly formed Maryland General Assembly succeeded the conventions as the permanent legislative body.

== Functions and legacy ==
The Maryland Provincial Convention was unicameral and combined legislative and executive powers. It served as the central authority in the colony after royal governance collapsed, organized militias, enforced Continental policies, and laid the foundations for Maryland's transition to statehood.
