= Proprietary colony =

Type of English colony

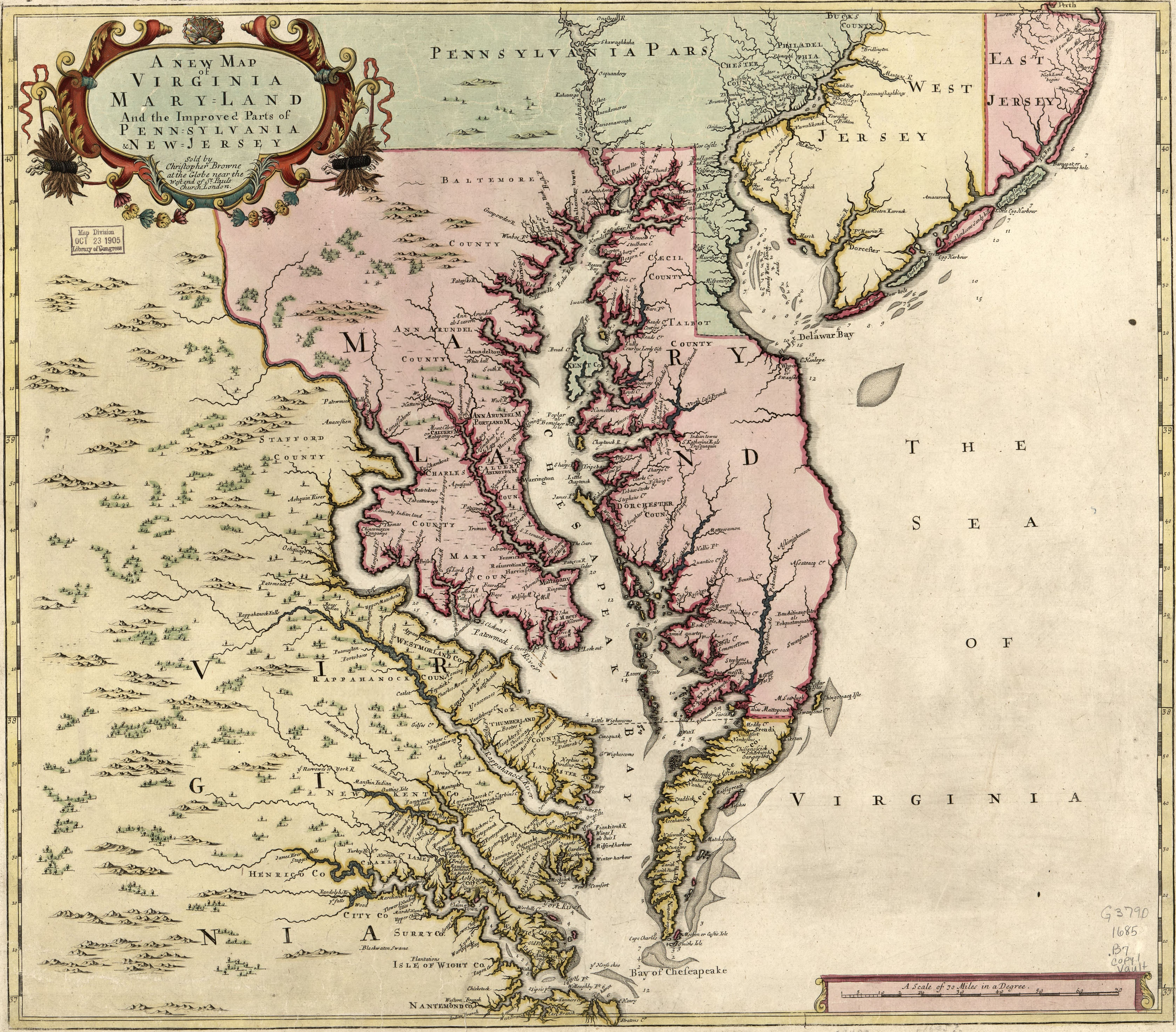
1685 map of the Province of Maryland, which was founded as a proprietary colony

Proprietary colonies were a type of colony in English America which existed during the early modern period. In English overseas possessions established from the 17th century onwards, all land in the colonies belonged to the Crown, which held ultimate authority over their management. All English colonies were divided by the Crown via royal charters into one of three types of colony; proprietary colonies, charter colonies and Crown colonies. Under the proprietary system, individuals or companies (often joint-stock companies), known as proprietors, were granted commercial charters by the Crown to establish overseas colonies. These proprietors were thus granted the authority to select the governors and other officials in the colony.

This type of indirect rule eventually fell out of favour in the English colonial empire due to a variety of reasons, including the gradual sociopolitical stabilisation of England's American colonies, the easing of bureaucratic difficulties in managing the colonies and increasing economic or administrative difficulties faced by proprietors. Successive English sovereigns sought to solidify their power and authority throughout the empire, and gradually converted proprietary colonies to Crown colonies, which were administered by officials directly appointed by the Crown. By the 18th century, most former proprietary colonies had been converted into Crown colonies.

== Practice ==
Proprietary colonies in America were governed by a lord proprietor, who, holding authority by virtue of a royal charter, usually exercised that authority almost as an independent sovereign. These colonies were distinct from Crown colonies in that they were commercial enterprises established under authority of the crown. Proprietary governors had legal responsibilities over the colony as well as responsibilities to shareholders to ensure the security of their investments.

The proprietary system was a mostly inefficient system, in that the proprietors were, for the most part, like absentee landlords. Many never even visited the colonies they owned. By the early 18th century, nearly all of the proprietary colonies had either surrendered their charters to the crown to become royal colonies, or else had significant limitations placed on them by the crown.

== Examples ==
=== The Caribbean ===
- Barbados

=== British America colonies before the American Revolution ===
The provinces of Maryland, Carolina and several other colonies in the Americas were initially established under the proprietary system.

King Charles II used the proprietary solution to reward allies and focus his own attention on Britain itself. He offered his friends colonial charters which facilitated private investment and colonial self-government. The charters made the proprietor the effective ruler, albeit one ultimately responsible to English Law and the King. Charles II gave the former Dutch colony New Netherlands to his younger brother The Duke of York, who established the Province of New York. He gave an area to William Penn who established the Province of Pennsylvania.

The land of what is now New Hampshire was settled by people whose land claims were granted under the authority of the Massachusetts Bay Colony. However, in 1679, Charles II partitioned Massachusetts to create the Province of New Hampshire. The new province was intended to be a proprietary colony owned by Robert Tufton Mason. The settlers mounted a legal campaign and successfully resisted the proprietary structure.

The British America colonies before the American Revolution consisted of 20 colonies on the continent's mainland. After the conflict, thirteen of those became states of the United States of America. By the time of the Revolution some had consolidated multiple grants, while others, such as conflicting claims to what became the state of Vermont and the western borders of numerous states, including New York and Virginia, as well as the sovereignty of what became the state of Maine in 1820, remained unresolved well after.

== Similar practices outside of English rule ==
=== Historical precedent ===
In medieval times, it was customary in Continental Europe for a sovereign to grant almost regal powers of government to the feudal lords of his border districts to prevent foreign invasion. Those districts or manors were often called palatinates or counties palatine because the lord wielded the power of the king in his palace. His power was regal in kind but inferior in degree to that of the king.

That type of arrangement had caused many problems in Norman times for certain English border counties. Those territories were known as counties palatine and lasted at least in part to 1830 for good reason: remoteness, poor communications, governance carried out under difficult circumstances. The monarch and the government retained their usual right to separate head and body, figuratively or literally, at any time. (See also the hereditary title marquess.)

=== French examples ===
In 1603, Henry IV, the King of France, granted Pierre Du Gua de Monts the exclusive right to colonize lands in North America at a latitude between 40° and 60° North. The King also gave Dugua a monopoly in the fur trade for those territories and named him Lieutenant General for Acadia and New France. In return, Dugua promised to bring 60 new colonists each year to what would be called Acadie. In 1607, the monopoly was revoked, and the colony failed, but in 1608, he sponsored Samuel de Champlain to open a colony at Quebec.

The Îles Glorieuses (Glorioso Islands) were on 2 March 1880 settled and named by the Frenchman Hippolyte Caltaux (b. 1847–d. 1907), who was their proprietor from until 1891. It was only on 23 August 1892 that they were claimed for the French Third Republic, as part of the Indian Ocean colony of French Madagascar. Caltaux again became their proprietor from 1901 to his death. On 26 June 1960, the islands became a regular French possession, administered by the High Commissioner for Réunion. On 3 January 2005, they were transferred to the administrators of the French Southern and Antarctic Lands.

== See also ==
- English colonial empire
- Proprietary governor
- Proprietary House
- Colonial government in the Thirteen Colonies
- Crown colony
- Commonwealth
- Lord proprietor
- Donatário
- Quia Emptores
