= Tobacco colonies =

Region in early English North America

The tobacco colonies were those that lined the sea-level coastal region of English North America known as Tidewater, extending from a small part of Delaware south through Maryland and Virginia into the Albemarle Sound region of North Carolina (the Albemarle Settlements). During the seventeenth century, the European demand for tobacco increased more than tenfold. This increased demand called for a greater supply of tobacco, and as a result, tobacco became the staple crop of the Chesapeake Bay Region.

== The Colonies ==
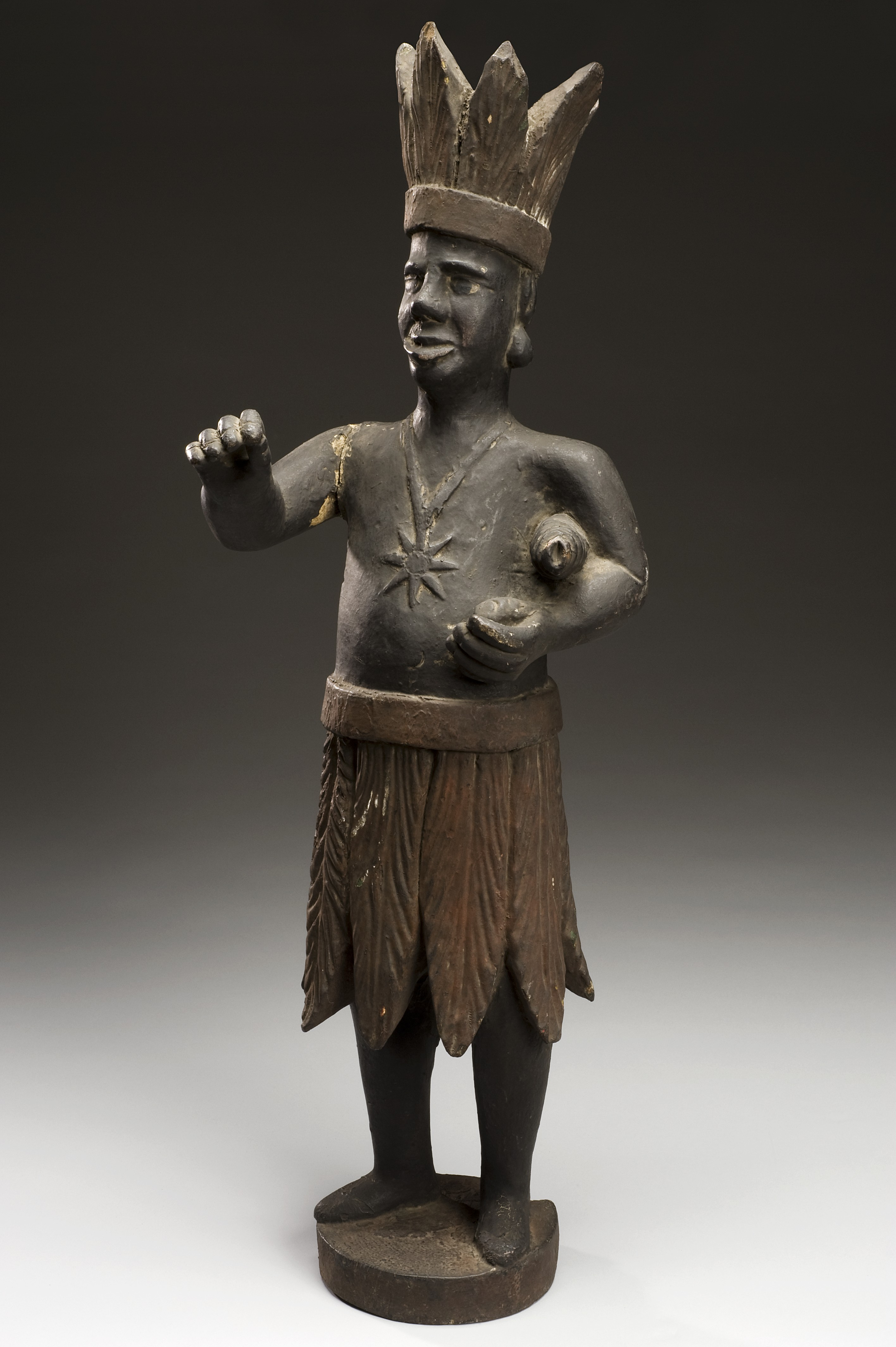
Cigar store Indian likely meant to portray a Powhatan leader, made in ~1750 and used to advertise a tobacconist's shop in England until 1900.

=== Virginia ===
The development of tobacco as an export began in Virginia in 1614 when one of the English colonists, John Rolfe, experimented with a plant he had brought from the West Indies, 'Nicotania tabacum'. In the same year, the first tobacco shipment was sent to England. The British prized tobacco, for it was a way to display one's wealth to the public. Only those of high status could afford the new product.

As tobacco's popularity grew, it became the savior of the colonies. Due to the rough climate, the colonies were not able to produce other crops necessary for survival. With no crops, they lacked an income and a food supply, so the colonists took the opportunity to begin growing tobacco. The Virginia climate and land structure was perfect for tobacco plantations. As Virginia tobacco rapidly gained popularity abroad, it became more difficult to encourage the production of diverse crops or other commodities in the colony. Land was readily available and quick profits could be made on tobacco.

Tobacco cultivation is labor-intensive, requiring a large labor force. Indentured servants came to Virginia, as well as other colonies, where they worked for several years in return for passage to the New World. The first slaves arrived in Virginia in 1619, but it was several decades before slavery became the dominant labor force in the colony. Tobacco was Virginia's primary agricultural export throughout the colonial period.

As time passed, the Virginia Colony steadily increased its tobacco production. However, between the years of 1740 and 1770, the few decades just prior to the American Revolution, the population of Virginia was increasing more quickly than its tobacco production was, resulting in greater economic diversification.

=== Maryland ===
In 1634 a second English colony, Maryland, was founded along the Chesapeake Bay. The land was granted by Charles I to Cecil Calvert, 2nd Baron Baltimore, as a proprietary colony. Founded as a source of income for Baltimore and a refuge for Roman Catholics, tobacco soon became the dominant export in Maryland as it had in Virginia. While there were some enslaved people who worked the plantations in Maryland from the very beginning, slavery was not widespread until after 1700. Until that time, most of the work on the tobacco plantations was done by indentured servants. The abundance of tobacco plantations in Maryland resulted in a lack of towns. Due to the geography of the Chesapeake Bay, there was no need for ports and roads. The inlets, creeks, coves, and river mouths allowed for ships to come directly to plantation wharves to trade English goods for tobacco (or corn, another widely-grown crop in Maryland).

=== North Carolina ===
While at first tobacco was grown in much larger quantities in Virginia and Maryland (the first and second largest colonial producers, respectively), North Carolina also grew the crop, and was ranked third among the colonies in tobacco production. North Carolina tobacco plantations were mostly concentrated along the coast and close to the Virginia border. This region was conducive to growing tobacco due to its proximity to the Albemarle Sounds. Compared to the other tobacco colonies, North Carolina was less developed, with no cities and barely any small towns or villages.

== Types of tobacco ==
There were two major types of tobacco grown in the colonies – Sweet-scented and Orinoco. Orinoco was coarser, bulkier, and the shape of the leaf was pointier. Sweet-scented leaves on the other hand were rounder and were made up of finer fibers. Orinoco was grown all over the Chesapeake Bay, whereas Sweet-scented was only grown along the Potomac, James, York, and Rappahannock Rivers. While those in England preferred Sweet-scented tobacco, which had a milder flavor, the rest of Europe tended to prefer Orinoco, which was therefore more profitable for colonial plantation owners.

== Economic ties to England ==
The tobacco colonies were economic entities of England and were forced to adhere to the mercantile system. Under mercantilism, England acquired natural resources and raw materials from the colonies, turned them into finished products, and then sold them, often back to the colonies, for a profit. During the colonial period, the British discouraged cotton production in America to protect its woolen and linen manufacturers. As a result, more tobacco was produced. As the populations of the tobacco colonies increased, so did tobacco exports to England. Between 1622 and 1628, tobacco imports from the tobacco colonies to England increased from 60,000 pounds to 500,000 pounds. By 1639, the figure had reached 1,500,000 pounds, and by the late 1600s, it was up to more than 20,000,000 pounds per year. The London export in 1689 totaled 5,156,676 lbs. and valued at £96,687.

== See also ==
- Atlantic Creole
- British colonization of North America
- Chesapeake Colonies
- Colonial South and the Chesapeake
- History of slavery
- Mercantilism
- Scramble (slave auction)
- Seasoning (colonialism)
- Slavery in the colonial history of the United States
- The Slave Route Project
- Thirteen Colonies
  - Middle Colonies
  - New England Colonies
  - Southern Colonies
- Tobacco and Slaves (1986 book)
- Tobacco in the American Colonies
