= Colonial South and the Chesapeake =

Cultural and historic region of British North America

During the British colonization of North America, the Thirteen Colonies provided England with an outlet for surplus population as well as a new market. The colonies exported naval stores, fur, lumber and tobacco to Britain, and food for the British sugar plantations in the Caribbean. The culture of the Southern and Chesapeake Colonies was different from that of the Northern and Middle Colonies and from that of their common origin in the Kingdom of Great Britain.

== Colonial economics ==
The economy was based on subsistence farming and export-oriented agriculture, supported by a few trade-oriented port cities.

=== Agriculture ===
Though indigo and rice were also grown, the demand for tobacco and the ease with which it grew turned tobacco into the largest cash crop for the Chesapeake and southern colonies. The desirable niche that tobacco held in the world market resulted in great local prosperity.

As agriculture grew in importance in the southern economy, the demand for more workers grew as well. Early on, labor shortages were solved temporarily by indentured servitude; however, this system eventually proved inefficient. Because Native Americans proved independent and difficult to enslave for forced cultivation and indentured servants were only temporary, growers in the South turned to African slave importation to meet their demand for labor. These slaves left a lasting impact upon southern agricultural techniques as well as social aspects of southern society. The family was also affected by the change also, because the need for slaves.

=== Trade ===
The region exported tobacco as well as naval stores (rope, masts, turpentine, rosin, pitch, and tar), lumber, grain, rice, and indigo to England, and food to the British colonies in the West Indies

==== Local ====
The local economy in the Chesapeake and southern colonies was characterized by the headright, the right to receive 50 acres (200,000 m^{2}) of land for any immigrant who settled in Virginia or paid for the transportation of an immigrant who settled in Virginia (51.342 acres (207,770 m^{2}) per head). This was intended to promote settlement and ownership of small farms by several immigrants, from which staple crops such as indigo, rice, and especially tobacco could be grown for profit.

Social standing was determined by how much wealth a person had. The best way to get more of it was to acquire more land for more cultivation. Since bringing over indentured servants was the easiest way get more land, it became a popular for wealthy planters to bring in the indentured servants in mass numbers. Also on the rise was the selling and buying of land, due to the fact that captains of ships sold the land that they received every time they landed with a load of indentured servants. This caused the development of large plantations near the Atlantic Coast and little urban activity, as the small farms were forced to live in the back country where Indian relations were volatile.

So it was because of all these effects from the Headright that made the local economy largely rural. As a result, the society became polarized between those who owned large tracts of land near the Atlantic and people whose land was subject to Indian attack as well as former indentured servants who could not afford the favored land . And of course it did not help that, since tobacco prices were unstable from the Navigation Acts, there was a prolonged economic depression. One outcome of this polarized society and economic depravity was Bacon's Rebellion, where farmers, wanting the unused Indian lands, attacked the local tribes and the government. This led to a shift in buying more slaves from Africa, as they did not all speak the same language, making them much easier to control. The local economy polarized the society from the Atlantic Coast plantation owners to the small scale farmers who wanted the unused Indian land.

==== Global ====
Global trade in the Chesapeake and southern colonies was mainly centered on the products of their agriculture. Cash crops like tobacco, rice, and indigo were the areas main exports. The deerskin trade was also a major factor in the economic growth of Charleston, South Carolina, which exported an average of 54,000 deer skins per year between 1699 and 1715. Most of these exports were headed to Britain, whose Navigation Acts restricted trade with other countries. Tobacco, rice, and indigo, which were enumerated products, could only be traded to Britain which had advantages and disadvantages. Obvious disadvantages would be that trade could only occur with one country, eliminating possible buyers. Fortunately, growing demand for these products meant a ready market with mostly escalating prices.

Since the demand for all of these products continued to grow, farmers found themselves with a little extra money around. Thus, slave importing began to grow until Charleston was a leading importer in slaves. These slaves led to increased production, increased profit, and a decrease of payment for workers. All of this moneymaking allowed farmers to buy more slaves to continue the cycle. Slaves brought their African knowledge which aided the development of rice and indigo growing. The diversifying of agriculture was key to avoid economic slumps that could have resulted from the fluctuating tobacco prices. The slaves also completed the trading process known as Triangle trade. The south and Chesapeake's point of the triangle involved the import of slaves from Africa, and the exporting of tobacco and other goods to England.

The agricultural society affected which items southern colonists exported. Slaves imported into the society influenced which crops would be grown and therefore which crops would be exported. Slave's usefulness and the economic gain to be had by using them also increased the number of Africans that were imported. All of the economic success that resulted from these trading tendencies led to a bigger rich-poor gap in society as the rich became richer and bought more slaves to get even more money. Growth of the wealthy class in turn led to the importing of more luxuries to the region as families began to show off their success. At the beginning of the 18th century, global trade of the southern colonies was changing a lot about their society.

== Social issues ==
=== Religion ===
The Chesapeake region had multiple sects of Christianity prevalent during its colonial formation. Maryland provided a strong draw for Roman Catholics who were looking for greater freedom than in England. Virginia had close ties with the established Anglican Church, and there were other smaller Protestant sects that lived throughout the region.

=== Class hierarchy ===
Much like the old world, colonial America was divided into a rigid social structure. Pedigree mattered more than anything, and wealthy, white families stood at the top of the social ladder. These families often controlled vast numbers of workers as well. These workers, enslaved African Americans, were the lowliest of those living in the colonies, standing below even the indentured workers who powered much of the new world. Next, predictably, were these same indentured servants, men who were offered passage to America in return for years of labor. Though some were honest men, wishing to scrape out a new life in the new world, many of these men were criminals, waifs, and convicts, sent to the new world as punishment.

The largest social class in the South and Chesapeake regions were the colonies' merchants, vendors, and small farmers. These people were the rank and file citizens, moderately educated and skilled, but willing to work hard and create the America they needed. Finally, at the top of the social ladder stood the wealthy white families, clergymen, magistrates, and large landholders in America. In this class, etiquette was rigidly enforced; no one was allowed to "dress above their station" and were forced to sit in the church according to their own social standing.

Dr. Alexander Hamilton (1712 – 1756) was a Scottish-born doctor and writer who lived and worked in Annapolis, Maryland. Leo Lemay says his 1744 travel diary Gentleman's Progress: The Itinerarium of Dr. Alexander Hamilton is "the best single portrait of men and manners, of rural and urban life, of the wide range of society and scenery in colonial America."

=== Slavery ===
In the early 17th century, Americans in Virginia and Maryland discovered tobacco to be very profitable. A lot of lands was given to tobacco plantations because of the high demand for the good in Europe. Before the 17th-century indentured servants were used to cultivate the land, but soon the new world's appeal to potential indentured servants decrease because the land grants they were formerly promised were no longer available. Therefore, plantation owners began to import slaves from Africa to do the work. The slaves were taken from their families in Africa and worked all day cultivating, drying leaves, and packing the tobacco. Many slaves tried to escape from their owners but very few succeeded. Generally, they were taken back to the plantation and whipped hundreds of times or castrated as punishment.

Carolina was a slave colony upon conception. Experienced slaves were brought from Africa to cultivate rice and indigo. By the 18th century the slave population outnumbered the white population. Lawmakers feared the growing African population, so they began to enforce restrictions on the number of black people that were imported. Another way they controlled the population was executing slaves convicted of violence against a white.

== Georgia ==
Founded in 1733 as a model yeoman society, slavery was prohibited. James Oglethorpe, one of the Georgia Trustees strongly resisted pressure from South Carolina to introduce slavery (late in life Oglethorpe was closely associated with Granville Sharp and other leading abolitionists). However, by 1749 powerful South Carolina interests and their allies had clandestinely brought so many slaves into Georgia that the Georgia Trustees were unable to stem the tide. The young colony soon became a satellite of South Carolina, and in a few years had 15,000 enslaved black people working on the plantations.

== Carolina ==
Carolina was a slave colony upon conception. Experienced slaves were brought from Africa to cultivate rice and indigo. By the early 18th century the slave population outnumbered the white population.

=== Immigration ===
The first successful settlement in the Chesapeake, Jamestown (1607), was set up by the Virginia Company and therefore its population was made up mostly of English. Because of its large reliance on labor for tobacco plantations that fueled the economy, the Chesapeake relied on indentured servants to work the land. However, after the events of Bacon's Rebellion plantation owners began to find slaves to be a better investment than indentured servants. This was a gradual shift by the 18th century but by 1750 the population of Virginia had skyrocketed to 450,000 and was almost evenly divided between African and European peoples.

Maryland was established by George Calvert as a refuge for Roman Catholics. Although it was intended as a refuge for Catholics a significant part of the population was Protestants and Protestants gained control of the colony during the Wars of the Three Kingdoms.

Carolina, originally one colony, later divided into North and South Carolina due to influences by immigrants. While North Carolina adopted the practices and economy of Virginia due to similar environmental set up and immigrant ethnicity, South Carolina developed differently because of the large influx of immigrants from Barbados. This diversity then led to their split with time. By the early 18th century the English government had restricted the immigration of English people to the colonies which caused a growing number of Scotch-Irish and Germans to emigrate. These people tended to settle in the back country and away from the more developed coastal areas.

==== Families ====
The husband was master of his household and expected to earn a living for his family. A woman's place was at home or helping her husband. Except for children of the elite, all others were expected to work by age 11 or 12.

Although slave marriages were not legally recognized, slaves – particularly females – did what they could to get married.

=== Urban and rural structure ===
Most large population centers in colonial America were located in New England or the Middle Colonies. In the Chesapeake Bay area cities included only Baltimore, Maryland, and Richmond, Virginia. Charleston, South Carolina, and Savannah, Georgia. served as major seaports for the Southern colonies in their trade with Europe, Africa, and the Caribbean. They were highly stratified by wealth.

In the Chesapeake and Southern regions, society was based heavily on agriculture; the urban population was very small. Most of the land was frontier "back country" that was thinly settled and abutted Indian land. The agricultural land was organized into a plantation system: a manorial structure in which a gentry of landed aristocrats (most of whom were successful early settlers to the region) owned the plantation. Bondspeople worked the land. These workers were indentured servants or, increasingly as the trade became more established, African slaves. Slaves made up a large percentage of the South's population.

The remainder of the population was those who were neither landed gentry nor slaves. These colonists (who were not only British—or of British descent—but also German and Scots-Irish) farmed small plots of land which they owned. This group, collectively known as yeoman farmers, constituted the majority of European colonists in the South and the Chesapeake areas. In the upland country, most free European settlers had similar conditions of wealth and were not as stratified as in the cities.

== Colonial politics ==
=== Government systems ===
The first democratically elected government was the House of Burgesses, which was first convened in 1619 in Virginia by Governor George Yeardley. The House of Burgesses, as with most colonial assemblies, was elected by free, white, landowning men.

All the colonies had a standard government: a governor and a council appointed by the crown, and an assembly or house of representatives that was elected by the people. The governor had the most power of any, his duties including judicial, religious, military, appointing officials, leader of legislature, but no power over public funds. The council generally consisted of 12 upper class residents of their colony. Assembly was the only branch with the power over funds and taxation, and it used this power as leverage over the governor to occasionally steal his power. As much power as the governor had, the ability of the assembly to exert power over the British-appointed governor led was a display of the division between the colonies and their mother country.

Bacon's Rebellion, likewise, showed how much influence the people could exert over their government when they disagreed with what the upper class in the government decided. The government was generally run by the rich plantation owners who already had enough land and just wanted to avoid conflict, so the poor free men rebelled by holding the House of Burgesses hostage. While succeeding for a while, the rebellion fell apart when Nathaniel Bacon died, though it still left a reminder of how much influence the average settler had in early American government.

=== British influence ===
As part of the British Empire, the colonies were subject to the control of London. While the British impacted many aspects of American culture, the political prestige and power of Great Britain perhaps had the strongest effect of all. The political structure of the Southern Colonies and the Chesapeake region and the manner of the different American political figures reflected the structure of the British Government.

When the Southern and Chesapeake colonies were first settled, they encountered numerous obstacles including conflicts with the natives. These conflicts led to the appointing of Royal Governors by the King. These governors resembled the King and kept order throughout the colonies. However, many of the traits of local governments remained intact.

In 1660, the King tightened up the royal government's hold in the colonies due to uprisings throughout the South and the Chesapeake region. The power of the Royal Government grew and they were soon in control of their trade. New laws were passed along with the Navigation Acts, and Vice Admiralty Courts were also established to prevent biased judging towards colonists.

As the rulers of the Southern and Chesapeake colonies, the Crown imposed its will upon the region and established control by intervening in legislative affairs. It appointed officials to run each section and they served as rulers away from home. New laws also forced the colonies to change the way they managed their government and economy. While the colonies were separated geographically from their homeland, the powerful political influence of the King and Parliament greatly affected their politics.

== See also ==
- History of the Southern United States
  - History of Georgia
  - History of Maryland
    - History of Baltimore
  - History of North Carolina
  - History of South Carolina
    - History of Charleston, South Carolina
  - History of Virginia
- Colonial history of the United States, including French and Spanish colonization in the South
- Middle Colonies
- Atlantic Creole
- Chesapeake Colonies
- Slavery in the colonial history of the United States
- Tobacco colonies
