= Chesapeake Colonies =

Historic region of British North America

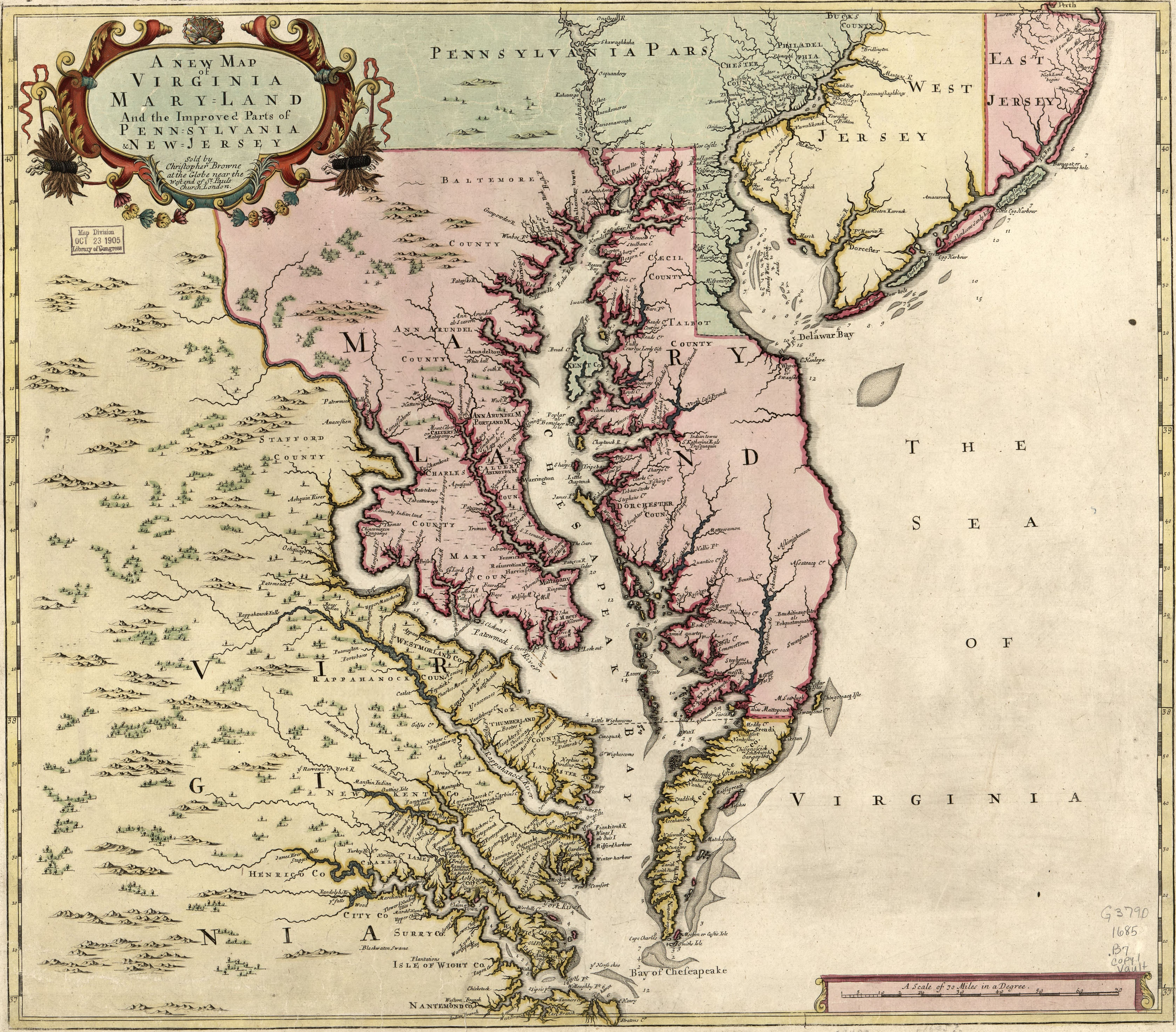
A new map of Virginia, Maryland, and the improved parts of Pennsylvania & New Jersey, 1685 map of the Chesapeake region by Christopher Browne

The Chesapeake Colonies were the Colony and Dominion of Virginia, later the Commonwealth of Virginia, and Province of Maryland, later Maryland, both colonies located in British America and centered on the Chesapeake Bay.

== History ==
Settlements of the Chesapeake region grew slowly due to diseases such as malaria. Most of these settlers were male immigrants from England who died soon after their arrival. Due to the majority being men, eligible women did not remain single for long. The native-born population eventually became immune to the Chesapeake diseases and these colonies were able to continue through all the hardships.

The Chesapeake region had a one-crop economy, based on tobacco. This contributed to the demand for slave labor in the Southern colonies. Tobacco also depleted nutrients in the soil, and new land was continually needed for its cultivation. White indentured servants were also common in this region early in its settlement, gradually being replaced by African slaves by the latter half of the seventeenth century due to improved economic conditions in Europe and the resulting decrease in emigration to the Chesapeake region. Indentured servants were people who signed a contract of indenture requiring them to work for their Chesapeake masters for an average of five to seven years, in return for the cost of the Atlantic crossing. When finished, they might be given land, or goods consisting of a suit of clothes, some farm tools, seed, and perhaps a gun.

== See also ==
- Atlantic Creole
- British colonization of North America
- Colonial families of Maryland
- Colonial South and the Chesapeake
- First Families of Virginia
- History of White Americans in Baltimore
- Old Stock Americans
- Washington metropolitan area
- Province of Maryland
- Thirteen Colonies
  - Middle Colonies
  - New England Colonies
  - Southern Colonies
- Tobacco colonies
