= Southern Colonies =

16/17th-century British colonies which became the Southern United States

The Southern Colonies with in British America consisted of the Province of Maryland, the Colony of Virginia, the Province of Carolina (in 1712 split into North and South Carolina), and the Province of Georgia. In 1763, the newly created colonies of East Florida and West Florida were added to the Southern Colonies by Great Britain until the Spanish Empire took back Florida. These colonies were the historical core of what became the Southern United States, or "Dixie". They were located south of the Middle Colonies, although Virginia and Maryland (located on the expansive Chesapeake Bay in the Upper South) were also called the Chesapeake Colonies.

Bacon's Rebellion shaped the way that servitude and slavery worked in the South. After a series of attacks on the Susquehannock, attacks that ensued after the group of natives burnt one of Bacon's farms, Bacon's arrest, along with other arrest warrants, were issued by Governor Berkely, for attacking the natives without his permission. Bacon avoided detainment, though, and then burnt Jamestown, in response to the governor previously denying him land in fear of native attacks. Bacon hadn't believed his policies were entirely conventional, saying that they didn't ensure protection to the English settlers, as well as the exclusion of Bacon from Berkeley's social clubs and friend groups. The rebellion dissolved some time in 1676, following Charles II's initial sending of troops to restore order in the colony. This rebellion influenced the view of the Africans, helping create a completely African servitude and workforce in the Chesapeake Colonies, alleviating primarily White servitude, a working class that could be repugnant at times through disobedience and mischief. This also helped racial superiority in white regions, helping the poor and wealthy white people feel almost equal. It diminished alliances between white and black people, as had happened in Bacon's Rebellion.

The colonies developed prosperous economies based on the cultivation of cash crops, such as tobacco, indigo, and rice. An effect of the cultivation of these crops was the presence of slavery in significantly higher proportions than in other parts of British America.

== Carolina ==
The Province of Carolina, originally chartered in 1608, was an English and later British colony of North America. Because the original charter was unrealized and was ruled invalid, a new charter was issued to a group of eight English noblemen, the Lords Proprietors, on March 24, 1663. Led by Anthony Ashley-Cooper, 1st Earl of Shaftesbury, the province of Carolina was controlled from 1663 to 1729 by these lords and their heirs.

Shaftesbury and his secretary, the philosopher John Locke, devised an intricate plan to govern the many people arriving in the colony. The Fundamental Constitutions of Carolina sought to ensure the colony's stability by allotting political status by a settler's wealth upon arrival - making a semi-manorial system with a Council of Nobles and a plan to have small landholders defer to these nobles. However, the settlers did not find it necessary to take orders from the council.

By 1680, the colony had a large export industry of tobacco, lumber, and pitch.

In 1691, dissent over the governance of the province led to the appointment of a deputy governor to administer the northern half of Carolina. After nearly a decade in which the British government sought to locate and buy out the proprietors, both Carolinas became royal colonies.

== Georgia ==
The British colony of Georgia was founded by James Oglethorpe on February 12, 1733. The colony was administered by the Georgia Trustees under a charter issued by and named for King George II. The Trustees implemented an elaborate plan for the settlement of the colony, known as the Oglethorpe Plan, which envisioned an agrarian society of Yeoman farmers and prohibited slavery. In 1742 the colony was invaded by the Spanish during the War of Jenkins' Ear. In 1752, after the government failed to renew subsidies that had helped support the colony, the Trustees turned over control to the Crown, and Georgia became a Crown colony, with a governor appointed by the king. The warm climate and swampy lands make it perfect for growing crops such as tobacco, rice, sugarcane, and indigo.

== Maryland ==
George Calvert received a charter from King Charles I to found the colony of Maryland in 1632. When George Calvert died, Cecilius Calvert, later known as Lord Baltimore, became the proprietor. Calvert came from a wealthy Catholic family and was the first individual (rather than a joint-stock company) to receive a grant from the Crown. He received a grant for a large tract of land north of the Potomac river and on either side of Chesapeake Bay. Calvert planned on creating a haven for English Roman Catholics, many of whom were well-to-do nobles such as himself who could not worship in public. He planned on creating an agrarian manorial society where each noble would have a large manor and tenants would work in the fields and on other tasks. However, with extremely cheap land prices, many Protestants moved to Maryland and bought land for themselves. They soon became a majority of the population, and in 1642 religious tension began to erupt. Calvert was forced to take control and pass the Maryland Toleration Act in 1649, making Maryland the second colony to have freedom of worship, after Rhode Island. However, the Act did little to help religious peace. In 1654, Protestants barred Catholics from voting, ousted a pro-tolerance Governor, and repealed the Toleration Act. Maryland stayed Protestant until Calvert again took control of the colony in 1658.

== Virginia ==
The Colony of Virginia existed as an English colony briefly during the 16th century, and then continuously from 1607 until the American Revolution (as a British colony after 1707). The name Virginia was first applied by Sir Walter Raleigh and Queen Elizabeth I in 1584. Jamestown was the first town created by the Virginia colony. After the English Civil War in the mid 17th century, the Virginia Colony was nicknamed "The Old Dominion" by King Charles II for its perceived loyalty to the English monarchy during the era of the Commonwealth of England.

While other colonies were being founded, Virginia continued to grow. Tobacco planters held the best land near the coast, so new settlers pushed inland. Sir William Berkeley, the colony's governor, sent explorers over the Blue Ridge Mountains to open up the back country of Virginia to settlement.

After independence from Great Britain in 1776 the Virginia Colony became the Commonwealth of Virginia, one of the original thirteen states of the United States, adopting as its official slogan "The Old Dominion". The states of West Virginia, Kentucky, Indiana, Illinois, and portions of Ohio, were all later created from the territory encompassed earlier by the Colony of Virginia.

== See also ==
- Chesapeake Colonies
- Colonial South and the Chesapeake
- Colonial history of the United States
- Confederate States of America
- Mid-Atlantic
- Middle Colonies
- New England Colonies
- South Atlantic States
