= Thirteen Colonies =

British colonies forming the United States

- 1607–1776
- Flag of British America (1707–1775); Flag of the United Colonies (1775–1777)
- Anthem: God Save the King
- The Thirteen Colonies (shown in red) in 1775 with modern borders overlaid
- Status: British colonies (British Empire)
- Government: System of various colonial arrangements New England Colonies: Province of New Hampshire; Province of Massachusetts Bay; Colony of Rhode Island and Providence Plantations; Connecticut Colony; Middle Colonies: Province of New York; Province of New Jersey; Province of Pennsylvania; Delaware Colony; Southern Colonies: Province of Maryland; Colony of Virginia; Province of North Carolina; Province of South Carolina; Province of Georgia
- Monarch
  - 1607–1625: James I and VI (first)
  - 1760–1776: George III (last)
- Historical era: British colonization of the Americas
  - Roanoke Colony: 1585
  - Virginia Colony: 1607
  - New England: 1620
  - Rhode Island Royal Charter: 1663
  - New Netherland ceded to England: 1667
  - Treaty of Utrecht: 1713
  - Province of Georgia: 1732
  - French and Indian War: 1754–1763
  - Articles of Association: 1774
  - Independence declared: 1776
  - Treaty of Paris: 1783

Population
  - 1625: 1,980
  - 1775: 2,400,000
Preceded by	Succeeded by
Pre-colonial North America; New Netherland	United Colonies
- Today part of: United States

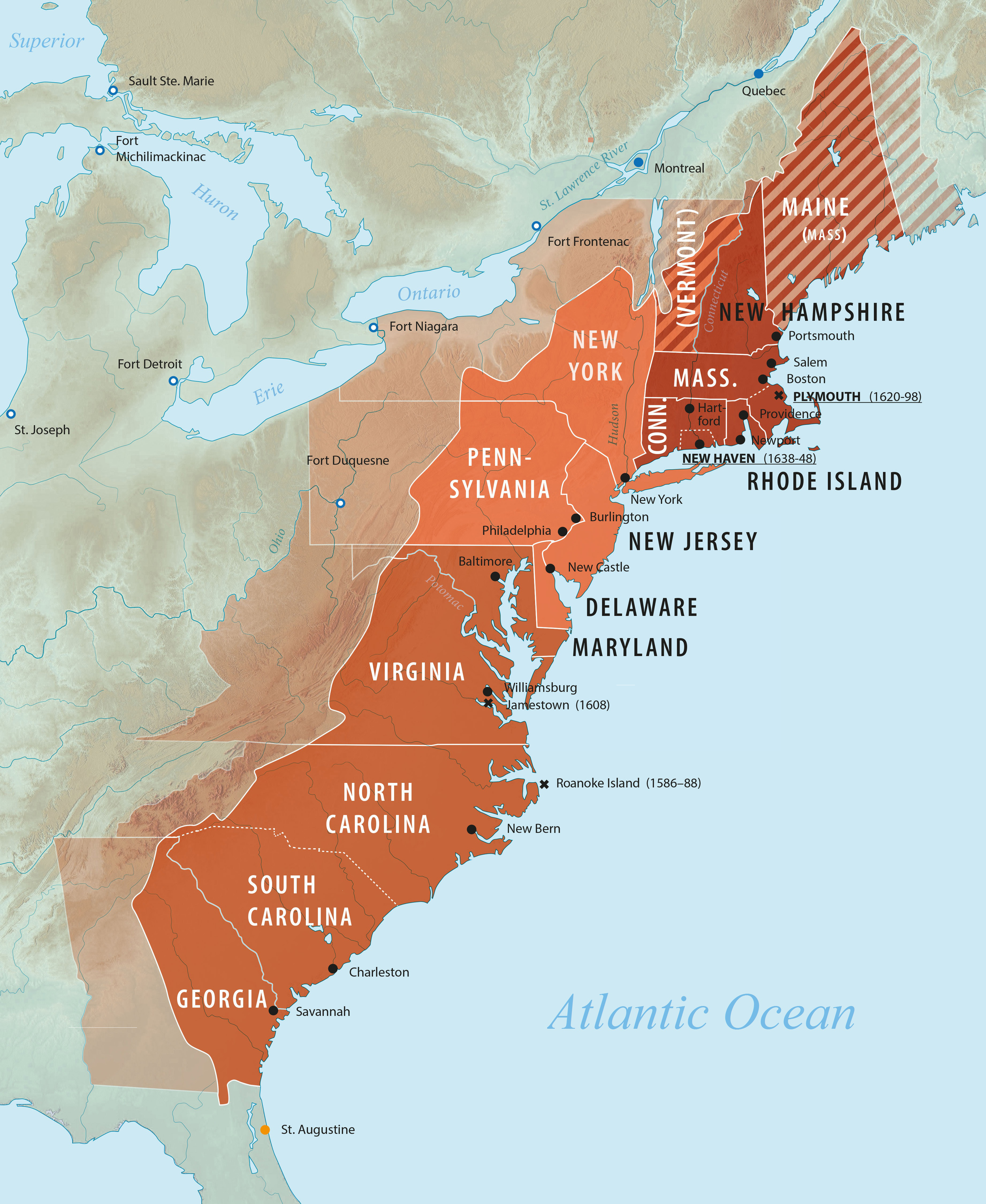
The Thirteen Colonies of British America: (dark red): New England Colonies (red-brown): Middle Colonies (brown): Southern Colonies

The Thirteen Colonies were the British colonies on the Atlantic coast of North America which broke away from the British Crown in the American Revolutionary War (1775–1783), and joined to form the United States of America.

The Thirteen Colonies in their traditional groupings were: the New England Colonies (Province of New Hampshire, Province of Massachusetts Bay, Colony of Rhode Island and Providence Plantations, and Connecticut Colony); the Middle Colonies (Province of New York, Province of New Jersey, Province of Pennsylvania, and Delaware Colony); and the Southern Colonies (Province of Maryland, Colony of Virginia, Province of North Carolina, Province of South Carolina, and Province of Georgia). These colonies were part of British America, which also included territory in the Floridas, the Caribbean, and what is today Canada.

The Thirteen Colonies were separately administered under the Crown, but had similar political, constitutional, and legal systems, and each was dominated by Protestant English-speakers. The first of the colonies, Virginia, was established at Jamestown in 1607. Maryland, Pennsylvania, and the New England Colonies were substantially motivated by their founders' concerns related to the practice of religion. The other colonies were founded for business and economic expansion. The Middle Colonies were established on the former Dutch colony of New Netherland.

Between 1625 and 1775, the colonial population grew from 2 thousand to 2.4 million, largely displacing the region's Native Americans. The population included people subject to a system of slavery, which was legal in all of the colonies. In the 18th century, the British government operated under a policy of mercantilism, in which the central government administered its colonies for Britain's economic benefit.

The 13 colonies had a degree of self-governance and active local elections, (Note: In no colony was there universal suffrage; the vote was restricted to free male subjects of a certain wealth measured by amount of property or extent of taxes paid, excluding the working classes, women, the enslaved, and Native Americans (Indians) from voting. Moreover, colonies, as in Britain, had varying religious tests for participation in government.) and they resisted London's demands for more control over them. The French and Indian War (1754–1763) against France and its Indian allies led to growing tensions between Britain and the 13 colonies. During the 1750s, the colonies began collaborating instead of dealing directly with Britain. With the help of colonial printers and newspapers, these inter-colonial activities and concerns were shared and led to calls for protection of the colonists' "Rights as Englishmen", especially the principle of "no taxation without representation".

Late 18th century conflicts with the British government over taxes and rights led to the American Revolution, in which the Thirteen Colonies joined for the first time to form the Continental Congress and raised the Continental Army, declaring independence in 1776. They fought the Revolutionary War with the aid of the Kingdom of France and, to a much lesser degree, the Dutch Republic and the Kingdom of Spain.

== British colonies ==
In 1606, King James I of England granted charters to both the Plymouth Company and the London Company for the purpose of establishing permanent settlements in America. The London Company established the Colony of Virginia in 1607, the first permanently settled English colony on the continent. The Plymouth Company founded the Popham Colony on the Kennebec River, but it was short-lived. The Plymouth Council for New England sponsored several colonization projects, culminating with Plymouth Colony in 1620 which was settled by English Puritan separatists, known today as the Pilgrims. The Dutch, Swedish, and French also established successful American colonies at roughly the same time as the English, but they eventually came under the English crown. The Thirteen Colonies were complete with the establishment of the Province of Georgia in 1732, although the term "Thirteen Colonies" became current only in the context of the American Revolution. (Note: The number 13 is mentioned as early as 1720. This includes Carolina as a single colony and does not include Georgia, but instead counts Nova Scotia and Newfoundland as British colonies.)

In London, beginning in 1660, all colonies were governed through a state department known as the Southern Department, and a committee of the Privy Council called the Board of Trade and Plantations. In 1768, a specific state department was created for America, but it was disbanded in 1782 when the Home Office took responsibility.

=== New England colonies ===
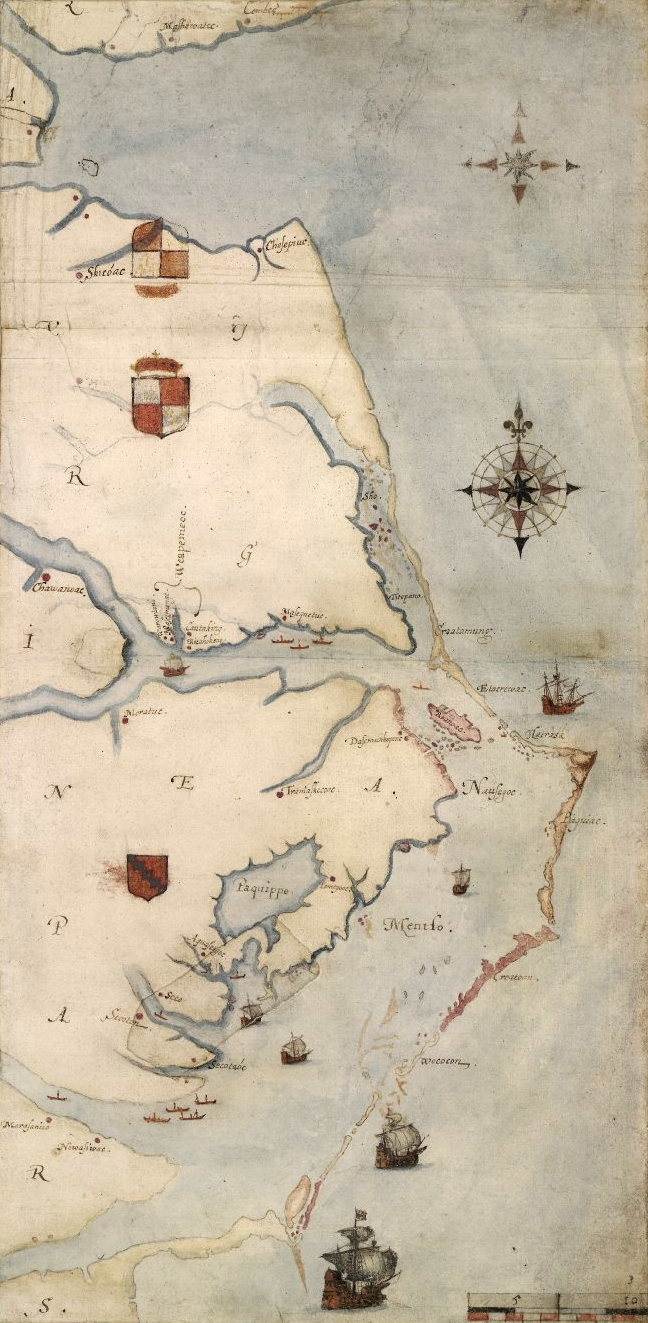
A 1584 map of the east coast from Chesapeake Bay to Cape Lookout, drawn by the English colonial governor, explorer, artist, and cartographer John White; in 1607, Jamestown, the first permanent English settlement, was established in this region.

1. Province of Massachusetts Bay, chartered as a royal colony in 1691
  - Popham Colony, established in 1607; abandoned in 1608
  - Plymouth Colony, established in 1620; merged with Massachusetts Bay Colony in 1691
  - Province of Maine, patent issued in 1622 by Council for New England; patent reissued by Charles I in 1639; absorbed by Massachusetts Bay Colony by 1658
  - Massachusetts Bay Colony, established in 1628; merged with Plymouth Colony in 1691
2. Province of New Hampshire, established in 1629; merged with Massachusetts Bay Colony in 1641; chartered as royal colony in 1679
3. Connecticut Colony, established in 1636; chartered as royal colony in 1662
  - Saybrook Colony, established in 1635; merged with Connecticut Colony in 1644
  - New Haven Colony, established in 1638; merged with Connecticut Colony in 1664
4. Colony of Rhode Island and Providence Plantations chartered as royal colony in 1663
  - Providence Plantations, established by Roger Williams in 1636
  - Portsmouth, established in 1638 by John Clarke, William Coddington, and others
  - Newport, established in 1639 after a disagreement and split among the settlers in Portsmouth
  - Warwick, established in 1642 by Samuel Gorton
  - These four settlements merged into a single Royal colony in 1663

Plymouth, Massachusetts Bay, Connecticut, and New Haven Colonies formed the New England Confederation in 1643, and all New England colonies were included in the Dominion of New England (1686–1689).

=== Middle colonies ===
5. Delaware Colony (before 1776, the Lower Counties on Delaware), established in 1664 as proprietary colony
6. Province of New York, established as a proprietary colony in 1664; chartered as royal colony in 1686; included in the Dominion of New England (1686–1689)
7. Province of New Jersey, established as a proprietary colony in 1664; chartered as a royal colony in 1702
  - East Jersey, established in 1674; merged with West Jersey to re-form Province of New Jersey in 1702; included in the Dominion of New England
  - West Jersey, established in 1674; merged with East Jersey to re-form Province of New Jersey in 1702; included in the Dominion of New England
8. Province of Pennsylvania, established in 1681 as a proprietary colony

=== Southern colonies ===
9. Colony of Virginia, established in 1607 as a proprietary colony; chartered as a royal colony in 1624.
10. Province of Maryland, established 1632 as a proprietary colony.
11. Province of North Carolina, previously part of the Carolina province (see below) until 1712; chartered as a royal colony in 1729.
12. Province of South Carolina, previously part of the Carolina province (see below) until 1712; chartered as a royal colony in 1729.
13. Province of Georgia, established as a proprietary colony in 1732; royal colony from 1752.

The Province of Carolina was initially chartered in 1629, and initial settlements were established after 1651. That charter was voided in 1660 by Charles II, and a new charter was issued in 1663, making it a proprietary colony. The Carolina province was divided into separate proprietary colonies, north and south, in 1712, before both became royal colonies in 1729.

Earlier, along the coast, the Roanoke Colony was established in 1585, re-established in 1587, and found abandoned in 1590.

== 17th century ==
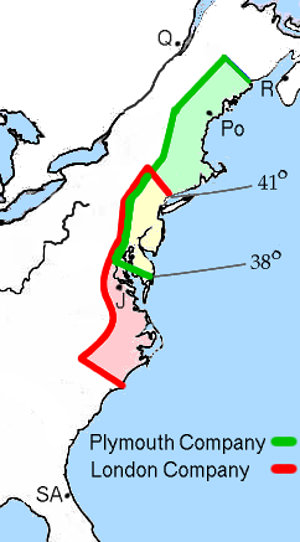
The 1606 grants by James I to the London and Plymouth companies. The overlapping area (in yellow) was granted to both companies on the stipulation that neither would establish a settlement within 100 miles (160 km) of each other. The location of early settlements is shown, including Jamestown (J), Quebec (Q), Popham (Po), Port Royal (R), and St. Augustine (SA).

=== Southern colonies ===
The first British colony was Jamestown, established on May 14, 1607, near Chesapeake Bay. The business venture was financed and coordinated by the London Virginia Company, a joint-stock company looking for gold. Its first years were extremely difficult, with very high death rates from disease and starvation, wars with local Indians, and little gold. The colony survived and flourished by turning to tobacco as a cash crop.

In 1632, King Charles I granted the charter for the Province of Maryland to Cecil Calvert, 2nd Baron Baltimore. Calvert's father had been a prominent Catholic official who encouraged Catholic immigration to the English colonies. The charter offered no guidelines on religion.

The Province of Carolina was the second attempted English settlement south of Virginia, the first being the failed attempt at Roanoke. It was a private venture, financed by a group of English Lords Proprietors who obtained a Royal Charter to the Carolinas in 1663, hoping that a new colony in the south would become profitable like Jamestown. Carolina was not settled until 1670, and even then, the first attempt failed because there was no incentive for emigration to that area. Eventually, however, the Lords combined their remaining capital and financed a settlement mission to the area led by Sir John Colleton. The expedition located fertile and defensible ground at Charleston, originally Charles Town for Charles II of England.

=== Middle colonies ===
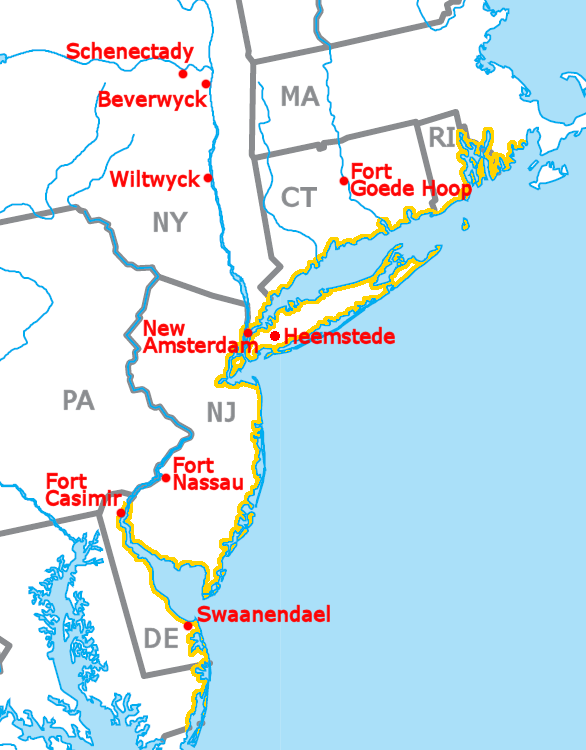
New Netherland with 17th-century Dutch claims in areas that later became English colonies shown in red and yellow. Present U.S. states are shown in gray. Four British colonies, New York, New Jersey, Pennsylvania, and Delaware, are referred to as the middle colonies.

Beginning in 1609, Dutch traders established fur trading posts on the Hudson River, Delaware River, and Connecticut River, seeking to protect their interests in the fur trade. The Dutch West India Company established permanent settlements on the Hudson River, creating the Dutch colony of New Netherland.

In 1626, Peter Minuit purchased the island of Manhattan from the Lenape Indians and established the outpost of New Amsterdam. Relatively few Dutch settled in New Netherland, but the colony came to dominate the regional fur trade. It also served as the base for extensive trade with the English colonies, and many products from New England and Virginia were carried to Europe on Dutch ships. The Dutch also engaged in the burgeoning Atlantic slave trade, bringing some enslaved Africans to the English colonies in North America, although many more were sent to Barbados and Brazil. The West India Company desired to grow New Netherland as it became commercially successful, yet the colony failed to attract the same level of settlement as the English colonies did. Many of those who did immigrate to the colony were English, German, Walloon, or Sephardim.

In 1638, Sweden established the colony of New Sweden in the Delaware Valley. The operation was led by former members of the Dutch West India Company, including Peter Minuit. New Sweden established extensive trading contacts with English colonies to the south and shipped much of the tobacco produced in Virginia. The colony was conquered by the Dutch in 1655, while Sweden was engaged in the Second Northern War.

Beginning in the 1650s, the English and Dutch engaged in a series of wars, and the English sought to conquer New Netherland. Richard Nicolls captured the lightly defended New Amsterdam in 1664, and his subordinates quickly captured the remainder of New Netherland. The 1667 Treaty of Breda ended the Second Anglo-Dutch War and confirmed English control of the region. The Dutch briefly regained control of parts of New Netherland in the Third Anglo-Dutch War but surrendered claim to the territory in the 1674 Treaty of Westminster, ending the Dutch colonial presence in America.

The British renamed the colony of New Amsterdam to "York City" or "New York". Large numbers of Dutch remained in the colony, dominating the rural areas between Manhattan and Albany, while people from New England started moving in, as well as immigrants from Germany. New York City attracted a large polyglot population, including a large black slave population. In 1674, the proprietary colonies of East Jersey and West Jersey were created from lands formerly part of New York.

Pennsylvania was founded in 1681 as a proprietary colony of Quaker William Penn. The main population elements included the Quaker population based in Philadelphia, a Scotch-Irish population on the Western frontier, and numerous German colonies in between. Philadelphia became the largest city in the colonies with its central location, excellent port, and a population of about 30,000.

=== New England ===
The Pilgrims were a small group of Puritan separatists who felt that they needed to distance themselves physically from the Church of England, which they perceived as corrupted. They initially moved to the Netherlands, but eventually sailed to America in 1620 on the Mayflower. Upon their arrival, they drew up the Mayflower Compact, by which they bound themselves together as a united community, thus establishing the small Plymouth Colony. William Bradford was their main leader. After its founding, other settlers traveled from England to join the colony.

More Puritans immigrated in 1629 and established the Massachusetts Bay Colony with 400 settlers. They sought to reform the Church of England by creating a new, ideologically pure church in the New World. By 1640, 20,000 had arrived; many died soon after arrival, but the others found a healthy climate and an ample food supply. The Plymouth and Massachusetts Bay colonies together spawned other Puritan colonies in New England, including the New Haven, Saybrook, and Connecticut colonies. During the 17th century, the New Haven and Saybrook colonies were absorbed by Connecticut.

Roger Williams established Providence Plantations in 1636 on land provided by Narragansett sachem Canonicus. Williams was a Puritan who preached religious tolerance, separation of church and state, and a complete break with the Church of England. He was banished from the Massachusetts Bay Colony over theological disagreements; he founded the settlement based on an egalitarian constitution, providing for majority rule "in civil things" and "liberty of conscience" in religious matters.

In 1637, a second group, including Anne Hutchinson, established a second settlement on Rhode Island, today called Aquidneck. Samuel Gorton and others established a settlement near Providence Plantations, which they called Shawomet. However, Massachusetts Bay attempted to seize the land and put it under its own authority, so Gorton travelled to London to gain a charter from the King. Robert Rich, 2nd Earl of Warwick assisted him in gaining the charter, so he changed the name of the settlement to Warwick. Roger Williams secured a Royal Charter from the King in 1663, which united all four settlements into the Colony of Rhode Island and Providence Plantations.

Other colonists settled to the north, mingling with adventurers and profit-oriented settlers to establish more religiously diverse colonies in New Hampshire and Maine. Massachusetts absorbed these small settlements when it made significant land claims in the 1640s and 1650s, but New Hampshire was eventually given a separate charter in 1679. Maine remained a part of Massachusetts until achieving statehood in 1820.

In 1685, King James II of England closed the legislatures and consolidated the New England colonies into the Dominion of New England, putting the region under the control of Governor Edmund Andros. In 1688, the colonies of New York, West Jersey, and East Jersey were added to the dominion. Andros was overthrown, and the dominion was closed in 1689, after the Glorious Revolution deposed King James II; the former colonies were re-established. According to Guy Miller, the Rebellion of 1689 was the "climax of the 60-year-old struggle between the government in England and the Puritans of Massachusetts over the question of who was to rule the Bay colony."

== 18th century ==
In 1702, East and West Jersey were combined to form the Province of New Jersey.

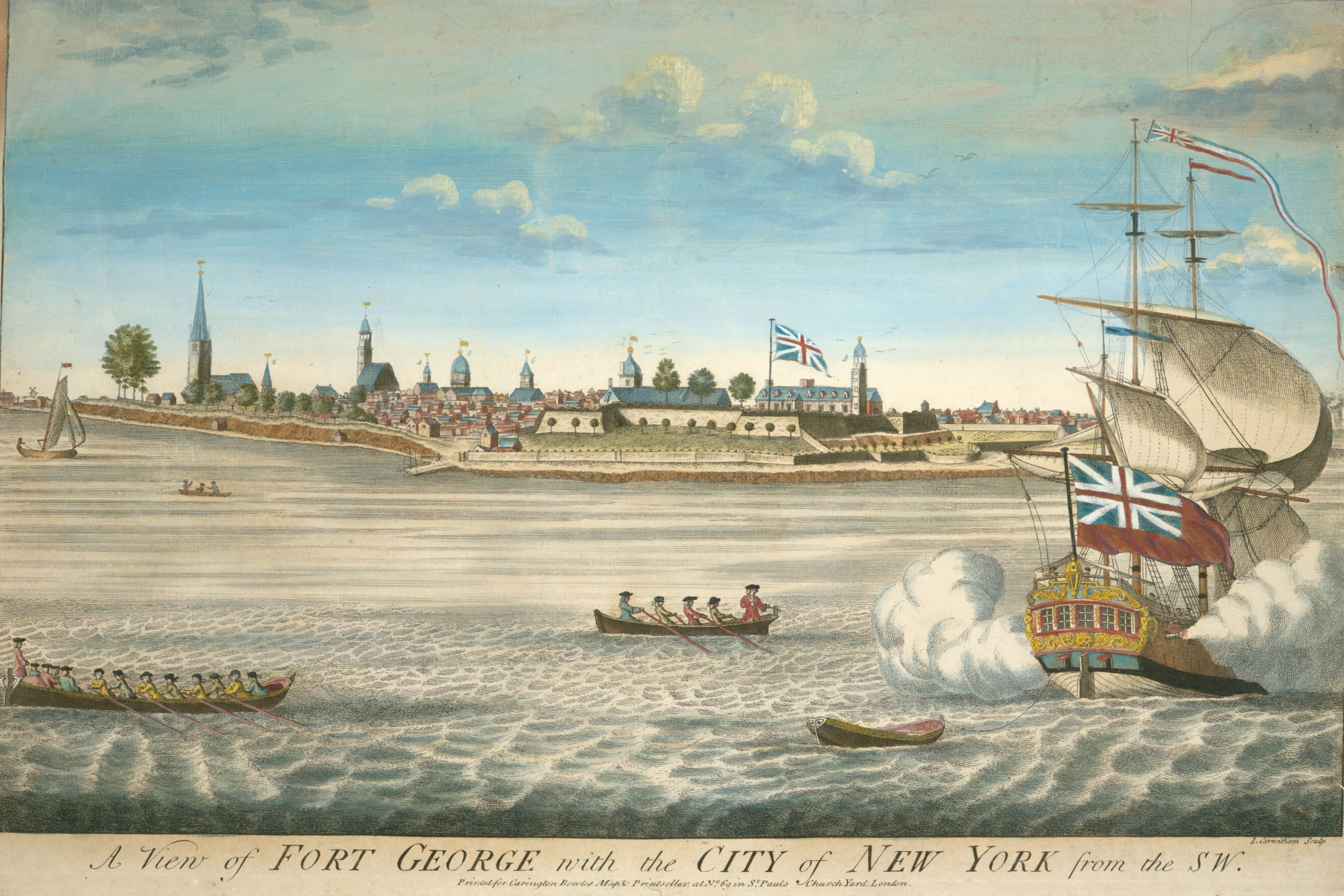
Fort George and New York, c. 1731

The northern and southern sections of the Carolina colony operated more or less independently until 1691, when Philip Ludwell was appointed governor of the entire province. From that time until 1708, the northern and southern settlements remained under one government. However, during this period, the two halves of the province began increasingly to be known as North Carolina and South Carolina, as the descendants of the colony's proprietors fought over the direction of the colony. The colonists of Charles Town finally deposed their governor and elected their own government. This marked the start of separate governments in the Province of North-Carolina and the Province of South Carolina. In 1729, the king formally revoked Carolina's colonial charter and established both North Carolina and South Carolina as crown colonies.

In the 1730s, Parliamentarian James Oglethorpe proposed that the area south of the Carolinas be colonized with the "worthy poor" of England to provide an alternative to the overcrowded debtors' prisons. Oglethorpe and other English philanthropists secured a royal charter as the Trustees of the colony of Georgia on June 9, 1732. Oglethorpe and his compatriots hoped to establish a utopian colony that banned slavery and recruited only the most worthy settlers, but by 1750, the colony remained sparsely populated. The proprietors gave up their charter in 1752, at which point Georgia became a crown colony.

The population of the Thirteen Colonies grew immensely in the 18th century. According to historian Alan Taylor, the population was 1.5 million in 1750, which represented four-fifths of the population of British North America. More than 90 percent of the colonists lived as farmers, though some seaports also flourished. In 1760, the cities of Philadelphia, New York, and Boston had a population of more than 16,000, which was small by European standards. By 1770, the economic output of the Thirteen Colonies made up forty percent of the gross domestic product of the entire British Empire.

As the 18th century progressed, colonists began to settle far from the Atlantic coast. Pennsylvania, Virginia, Connecticut, and Maryland all laid claim to the land in the Ohio River valley. The colonies engaged in a scramble to purchase land from Indian tribes, as the British insisted that claims to land should rest on legitimate purchases. Virginia was particularly intent on western expansion, and most of the elite Virginia families invested in the Ohio Company to promote the settlement of the Ohio Country.

=== Global trade and immigration ===
The British American colonies became part of the global British trading network, as the value tripled for exports from America to Britain between 1700 and 1754. The colonists were restricted in trading with other European powers, but they found profitable trade partners in the other British colonies, particularly in the Caribbean. The colonists traded foodstuffs, wood, tobacco, and various other resources for Asian tea, West Indian coffee, and West Indian sugar, among other items. American Indians far from the Atlantic coast supplied the Atlantic market with beaver fur and deerskins. America had an advantage in natural resources and established its own thriving shipbuilding industry, and many American merchants engaged in the transatlantic trade.

Improved economic conditions and easing of religious persecution in Europe made it more difficult to recruit labor to the colonies, and many colonies became increasingly reliant on slave labor, particularly in the South. The population of slaves in America grew dramatically between 1680 and 1750, and the growth was driven by a mixture of forced immigration and the reproduction of slaves. Slaves supported vast plantation economies in the South, while slaves in the North worked in a variety of occupations. There were a few local attempted slave revolts, such as the Stono Rebellion and the New York Conspiracy of 1741, but these uprisings were suppressed.

While the colonies also attracted immigrants from other European countries, English migrants formed the majority of the settler population after 1700. Immigrants from the rest of Europe travelled to all of the colonies, but the Middle Colonies attracted the most and continued to be more ethnically diverse than the other colonies. Numerous settlers immigrated from Ireland, including some Catholics and many Protestants—particularly "New Light" Ulster Presbyterians. Protestant Germans also immigrated in large numbers, particularly to Pennsylvania. In the 1740s, the Thirteen Colonies underwent a religious revival known as the First Great Awakening.

=== French and Indian War ===
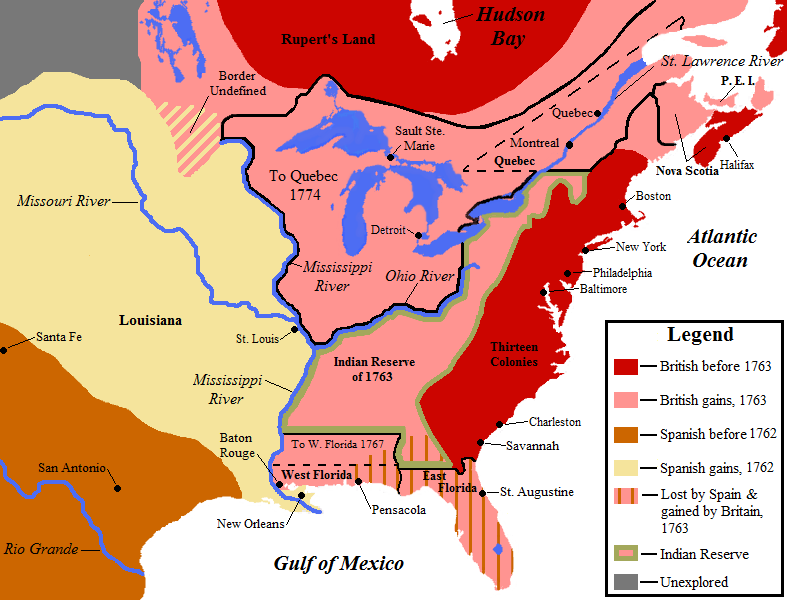
Territorial changes following the French and Indian War; land held by the British before 1763 is shown in red and land gained by Britain in 1763 is shown in pink

In 1738, an incident involving a Welsh mariner named Robert Jenkins sparked the War of Jenkins' Ear between Britain and Spain. Hundreds of North Americans volunteered for Admiral Edward Vernon's assault on Cartagena de Indias, a Spanish city in South America. The war against Spain merged into a broader conflict known as the War of the Austrian Succession, but most colonists called it King George's War. In 1745, British and colonial forces captured the town of Louisbourg, and the war came to an end with the 1748 Treaty of Aix-la-Chapelle. However, many colonists were angered when Britain returned Louisbourg to France in return for Madras and other territories. In the aftermath of the war, both the British and French sought to expand into the Ohio River valley.

The French and Indian War (1754–1763) was the American extension of the general European conflict known as the Seven Years' War. Previous colonial wars in North America had started in Europe and then spread to the colonies, but the French and Indian War is notable for having started in North America and spread to Europe. One of the primary causes of the war was increasing competition between Britain and France, especially in the Great Lakes and the Ohio Valley.

The French and Indian War took on a new significance for the British North American colonists when William Pitt the Elder decided that major military resources needed to be devoted to North America to win the war against France. For the first time, the continent became one of the main theaters of what could be termed a world war. During the war, it became increasingly apparent to American colonists that they were under the authority of the British Empire, as British military and civilian officials took on an increased presence in their lives.

The war also increased a sense of American unity in other ways. It caused men to travel across the continent who might otherwise have never left their own colony, fighting alongside men from decidedly different backgrounds who were nonetheless still American. Throughout the course of the war, British officers trained Americans for battle, most notably George Washington, which benefited the American cause during the Revolution. Also, colonial legislatures and officials had to cooperate intensively in pursuit of the continent-wide military effort. The relations were not always positive between the British military establishment and the colonists, setting the stage for later distrust and dislike of British troops.

At the 1754 Albany Congress, Pennsylvania colonist Benjamin Franklin proposed the Albany Plan which would have created a unified government of the Thirteen Colonies for coordination of defense and other matters, but the plan was rejected by the leaders of most colonies.

In the Treaty of Paris (1763), France formally ceded to Britain the eastern part of its vast North American empire, having secretly given to Spain the territory of Louisiana west of the Mississippi River the previous year. Before the war, Britain held the thirteen American colonies, most of present-day Nova Scotia, and most of the Hudson Bay watershed. Following the war, Britain gained all French territory east of the Mississippi River, including Quebec, the Great Lakes, and the Ohio River valley. Britain also gained Spanish Florida, from which it formed the colonies of East and West Florida. In removing a major foreign threat to the thirteen colonies, the war also largely removed the colonists' need for colonial protection.

The British and colonists triumphed jointly over a common foe. The colonists' loyalty to the mother country was stronger than ever before. However, disunity was beginning to form. British Prime Minister William Pitt the Elder had decided to wage the war in the colonies with the use of troops from the colonies and tax funds from Britain itself. This was a successful wartime strategy, but after the war was over, each side believed that it had borne a greater burden than the other. The British elite, the most heavily taxed of any in Europe, pointed out angrily that the colonists paid little to the royal coffers. The colonists replied that their sons had fought and died in a war that served European interests more than their own. This dispute was a link in the chain of events that soon brought about the American Revolution.

=== Growing dissent ===
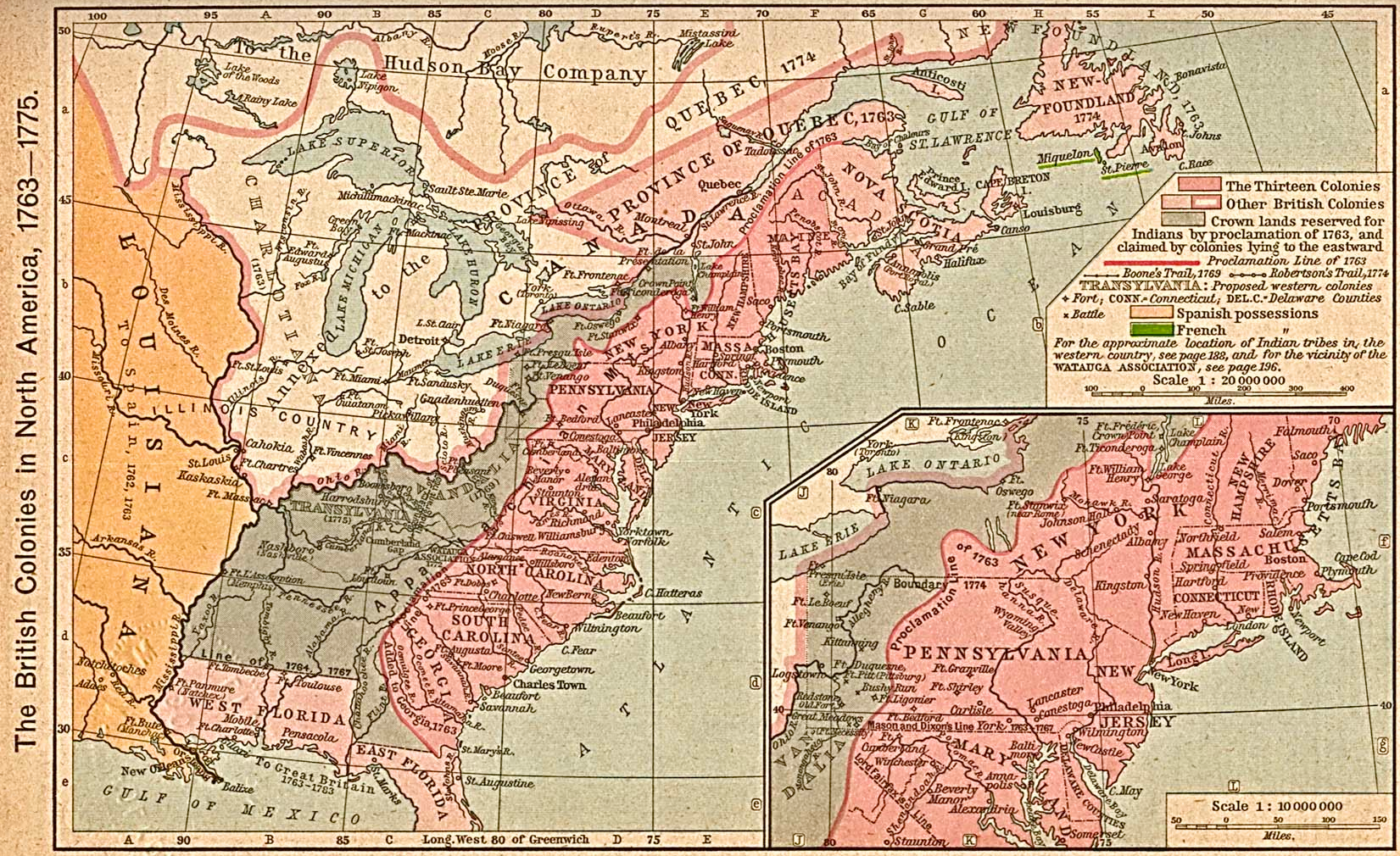
A map of the Thirteen Colonies (in red) and nearby colonial areas (1763–1775) just before the Revolutionary War

The British were left with large debts following the French and Indian War, so British leaders decided to increase taxation and control of the Thirteen Colonies. They imposed several new taxes, beginning with the Sugar Act 1764. Later acts included the Currency Act 1764, the Stamp Act 1765, and the Townshend Acts of 1767. Colonial newspapers and printers in particular took strong exception against the Stamp Act which imposed a tax on newspapers and official documents, and played a central role in disseminating literature among the colonists against such taxes and the idea of taxation without colonial representation.

The Royal Proclamation of 1763 restricted settlement west of the Appalachian Mountains, as this was designated an Indian Reserve. Some groups of settlers disregarded the proclamation, however, and continued to move west and establish farms. The proclamation was modified and was no longer a hindrance to settlement, but the fact angered the colonists that it had been promulgated without their prior consultation.

=== American Revolution ===
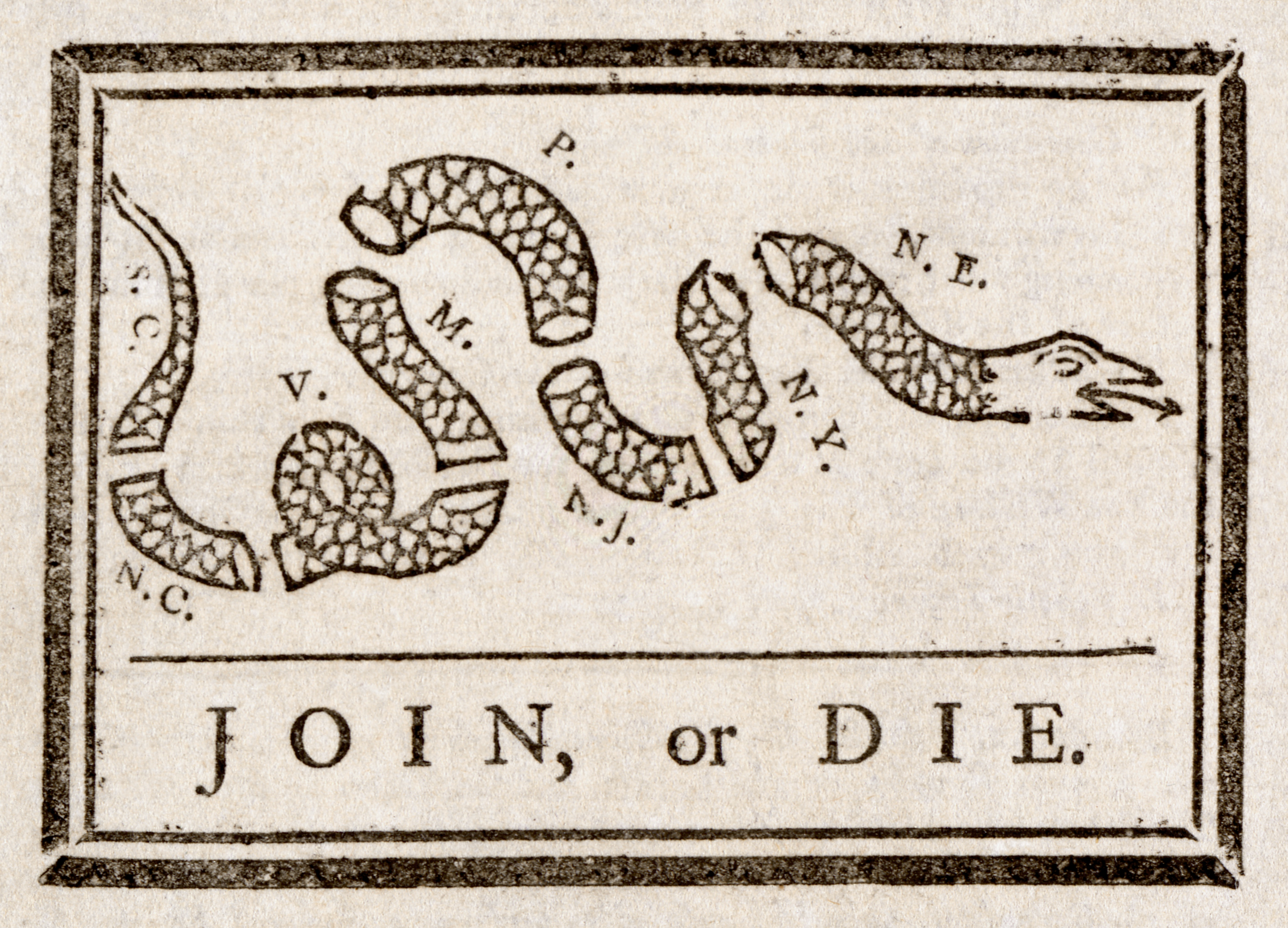
Join, or Die by Benjamin Franklin was recycled to encourage the former colonies to unite against British rule.

Parliament had directly levied duties and excise taxes on the colonies, bypassing the colonial legislatures, and Americans began to insist on the principle of "no taxation without representation" with intense protests over the Stamp Act of 1765. They argued that the colonies had no representation in the British Parliament, so it was a violation of their rights as Englishmen for taxes to be imposed upon them. Parliament rejected the colonial protests and asserted its authority by passing new taxes.

Colonial discontent grew with the passage of the 1773 Tea Act, which reduced taxes on tea sold by the East India Company in an effort to undercut the competition, and Prime Minister North's ministry hoped that this would establish a precedent of colonists accepting British taxation policies. Trouble escalated over the tea tax, as Americans in each colony boycotted the tea, and those in Boston dumped the tea in the harbor during the Boston Tea Party in 1773 when the Sons of Liberty dumped thousands of pounds of tea into the water. Tensions escalated in 1774 as Parliament passed the laws known as the Intolerable Acts, which greatly restricted self-government in the colony of Massachusetts. These laws also allowed British military commanders to claim colonial homes for the quartering of soldiers, regardless of whether the American civilians were willing or not to have soldiers in their homes. The laws further revoked colonial rights to hold trials in cases involving soldiers or crown officials, forcing such trials to be held in England rather than in America. Parliament also sent Thomas Gage to serve as Governor of Massachusetts and as the commander of British forces in North America.

By 1774, colonists still hoped to remain part of the British Empire, but discontentment was widespread concerning British rule throughout the Thirteen Colonies. Colonists elected delegates to the First Continental Congress, which convened in Philadelphia in September 1774. In the aftermath of the Intolerable Acts, the delegates asserted that the colonies owed allegiance only to the king; they would accept royal governors as agents of the king, but they were no longer willing to recognize Parliament's right to pass legislation affecting the colonies. Most delegates opposed an attack on the British position in Boston, and the Continental Congress instead agreed to the imposition of a boycott known as the Continental Association. The boycott proved effective, and the value of British imports dropped dramatically. The Thirteen Colonies became increasingly divided between Patriots opposed to British rule and Loyalists who supported it.

== American Revolutionary War ==
Minutemen during the Battles of Lexington and Concord, April 1775

In response, the colonies formed bodies of elected representatives known as Provincial Congresses, and colonists began to boycott imported British merchandise. Later in 1774, 12 colonies sent representatives to the First Continental Congress in Philadelphia. During the Second Continental Congress, the remaining colony of Georgia sent delegates as well. Quebec and Nova Scotia were invited to send delegates but declined.

Massachusetts Governor Thomas Gage feared a confrontation with the colonists; he requested reinforcements from Britain, but the British government was not willing to pay for the expense of stationing tens of thousands of soldiers in the Thirteen Colonies. Gage was instead ordered to seize Patriot arsenals. He dispatched a force to march on the arsenal at Concord, Massachusetts, but the Patriots learned about it and blocked their advance. The Patriots repulsed the British force at the April 1775 Battles of Lexington and Concord, then lay siege to Boston.

By spring 1775, all royal officials had been expelled, and the Continental Congress hosted a convention of delegates for the Thirteen Colonies. It raised an army to fight the British and named George Washington its commander, made treaties, declared independence, and recommended that the colonies write constitutions and become states, later enumerated in the 1777 Articles of Confederation. (Note: The States of: New Hampshire; Massachusetts bay; Rhode Island and Providence Plantations; Connecticut; New York; New Jersey; Pennsylvania; Delaware; Maryland; Virginia; North Carolina; South Carolina; Georgia (see Articles of Confederation and Perpetual Union).)

In May 1775, the Second Continental Congress, assembled in the revolutionary capital of Philadelphia, began recruiting soldiers for the Revolutionary War against the British, printing its own money, and appointing George Washington as commander of Patriot militias. Those from New England that had launched the Siege of Boston, which forced British troops to withdraw from Boston. The patriot militias were later formalized into the Continental Army under Washington's command.

=== Declaration of Independence ===
The Committee of Five presents their draft of the Declaration of Independence to the Second Continental Congress in Philadelphia.

The Second Continental Congress charged the Committee of Five, including John Adams, Benjamin Franklin, Thomas Jefferson, Robert R. Livingston, and Roger Sherman, with authoring the Declaration of Independence. The committee, in turn, asked Jefferson to author the first draft, which Jefferson largely wrote in isolation between June 11, 1776, and June 28, 1776, from the second floor of a three-story home he was renting at 700 Market Street in Philadelphia, now called the Declaration House and within walking distance of Independence Hall. Considering Congress's busy schedule, Jefferson probably had limited time for writing over these 17 days, and he likely wrote his first draft quickly.

On July 4, 1776, the Second Continental Congress unanimously adopted and issued the Declaration as a letter of grievances to King George III;

With the help chiefly of France, they defeated the British in the American Revolutionary War. The decisive victory came at the Siege of Yorktown in 1781. In the Treaty of Paris (1783), Britain officially recognized the independence of the United States of America.

== Population of Thirteen Colonies ==
Population of the thirteen British colonies (Note: The population figures are estimates by historians; they do not include the Indian tribes outside the jurisdiction of the colonies. They do include Indians living under colonial control, as well as slaves and indentured servants.)
Year	Estimated Population
1610	350
1620	2,302
1630	4,246
1640	25,734
1650	49,368
1660	75,058
1670	111,935
1680	151,507
1690	210,372
1700	250,588
1710	331,711
1720	466,185
1730	629,445
1740	905,563
1750	1,170,760
1760	1,593,625
1770	2,148,076

The colonial population rose to a quarter of a million during the 17th century, and to nearly 2.5 million on the eve of the American Revolution. The estimates do not include the Indian tribes outside the jurisdiction of the colonies. Good health was important for the growth of the colonies: "Fewer deaths among the young meant that a higher proportion of the population reached reproductive age, and that fact alone helps to explain why the colonies grew so rapidly." There were many other reasons for the population growth besides good health, such as the Great Migration.

By 1776, about 85% of the white population's ancestry originated in the British Isles (English, Scots-Irish, Scottish, Welsh), 9% of German origin, 4% Dutch, and 2% Huguenot French and other minorities. Over 90% were farmers, with several small cities that were also seaports linking the colonial economy to the larger British Empire. These populations continued to grow at a rapid rate during the late 18th and early 19th centuries, primarily because of high birth rates and relatively low death rates. Immigration was a minor factor from 1774 to 1830.

According to the United States Historical Census Database (USHCDB), the ethnic populations in the British American Colonies of 1700, 1755, and 1775 were:

Ethnic composition in the British American Colonies of 1700, 1755, 1775
1700	Percent	1755	Percent	1775	Percent
English and Welsh	80.0%	English and Welsh	52.0%	English	48.7%
African	11.0%	African	20.0%	African	20.0%
Dutch	4.0%	German	7.0%	Scots-Irish	7.8%
Scottish	3.0%	Scots-Irish	7.0%	German	6.9%
Other European	2.0%	Irish	5.0%	Scottish	6.6%
		Scottish	4.0%	Dutch	2.7%
		Dutch	3.0%	French	1.4%
		Other European	2.0%	Swedish	0.6%
				Other	5.3%
Colonies	100%	Colonies	100%	Thirteen Colonies	100%

=== Slavery ===
Chattel slavery was legal and practiced in all of the Thirteen Colonies. In most places, it involved house servants or farm workers. It was of economic importance in the export-oriented tobacco plantations of Virginia and Maryland and on the rice and indigo plantations of South Carolina. About 287,000 slaves were imported into the Thirteen Colonies over a period of 160 years, or 2% of the estimated 12 million taken from Africa to the Americas via the Atlantic slave trade. The great majority went to sugar colonies in the Caribbean and to Brazil, where life expectancy was short and the numbers had to be continually replenished. By the mid-18th century, life expectancy was much higher in the American colonies.

Slaves imported into Colonial America
1620–1700	1701–1760	1761–1770	1771–1780	Total
21,000	189,000	63,000	15,000	288,000

The numbers grew rapidly through a very high birth rate and low mortality rate, reaching nearly four million by the 1860 census. From 1770 until 1860, the rate of natural growth of North American slaves was much greater than for the population of any nation in Europe, and was nearly twice as rapid as that in England.

The legal status of chattel slavery has been explained by William M. Wiecek:

By the time of the Revolution, each of the mainland colonies had at least the rudiments of a statutory law of slavery...and nine of them had fairly elaborate slave codes that specified four basic legal characteristics of American slavery. First, the statutes defined slavery as a lifetime condition, distinguishing it from servitude and other forms of unfree status, which lasted only for a term of years. Second, slave status was made heritable through the mother. In so providing, the American colonies reversed the common-law rule that personal status followed the condition of the father.... The third fundamental statutory characteristic of American slavery was racial identification....The fourth and most troublesome of the elements of slavery for colonial legislators was the precise legal status of a slave as property.... southern jurisdictions ...settled on the legal definition of a slave as a "chattel personal."

=== Women ===
Women who were colonists were a minority of the population overall and their life varied depending on location and social status. The exact composition of males and females is unknown as there was no central census among all the colonies that was undertaken prior to the Revolution but select colonies did undertake them.

Unmarried women had the same level of rights as single men did. Single women could own property, enter contracts, file lawsuits or be subjected to them and make wills. Widowed and spinster (old unmarried women) had these abilities as well. When a woman got married under the common law system, she would need her husband's permission to make legal decisions. Although women could not hold office they could legally vote in some states with the exception of South Carolina, Delaware and Pennsylvania but this was often not exercised. Another way women participated in the political process was through political organizations.

=== Disease ===
The diseases that afflicted the early immigrant settlers were a dangerous threat to life. Some of the diseases were new, and treatments were ineffective. Malaria was deadly to many new arrivals, especially in the Southern colonies. Of newly arrived able-bodied young men, over one-fourth of the Anglican missionaries died within five years of their arrival in the Carolinas. Mortality was high for infants and small children, especially for diphtheria, smallpox, yellow fever, and malaria. Most sick people turned to local healers and used folk remedies. Others relied upon the minister-physicians, barber-surgeons, apothecaries, midwives, and ministers; a few used colonial physicians trained either in Britain or through an apprenticeship in the colonies. One common treatment was blood letting. The method was crude due to a lack of knowledge about germs and infection among medical practitioners. There was little government control, regulation of medical care, or attention to public health. By the 18th century, Colonial physicians, following the models in England and Scotland, introduced modern medicine to the cities in the 18th century, and made some advances in vaccination, pathology, anatomy, and pharmacology.

== Religion ==
According to Patricia Bonomi, "early Americans in all sections lived not in a spiritual desert but in a world where religion formed a key component of their mental landscape." Protestantism was the predominant religious affiliation in the Thirteen Colonies. There were also a few Catholics in Maryland, as well as Jews and deists; many colonists had no religious connection. The Church of England was officially established in most of the South. The Puritan movement divided into the Congregational and the Unitarian denominations, and was the established religious affiliation in Massachusetts and Connecticut into the 19th century. In practice, this meant that tax revenues were allocated to church expenses. The Anglican parishes in the South were under the control of local vestries and had public functions such as the repair of the roads and the relief of the poor. After 1700, the vestry no longer dominated the minister.

The colonies were religiously diverse, with different Protestant denominations brought by British, German, Dutch, and other immigrants. The Reformed tradition was the foundation for Presbyterian, Congregationalist, and Continental Reformed denominations. French Huguenots set up their own Reformed congregations. The Dutch Reformed Church was strong among Dutch Americans in New York and New Jersey, while Lutheranism was prevalent among German immigrants. Germans also brought diverse forms of Anabaptism, especially the Mennonite variety. Reformed Baptist preacher Roger Williams founded Providence Plantations which became the Colony of Rhode Island and Providence Plantations. Jews were clustered in a few port cities. The Baltimore family founded Maryland and brought in fellow Catholics from England. Catholics were about 1.6% of the population or 40,000 in 1775. Of the 200–250,000 Irish who came to the Colonies between 1701 and 1775, less than 20,000 were Catholic, many of whom hid their faith or lapsed because of prejudice and discrimination. Between 1770 and 1775 3,900 Irish Catholics arrived out of almost 45,000 white immigrants (7,000 English, 15,000 Scots, 13,200 Scots-Irish, 5,200 Germans). Most Catholics were English Recusants, Germans, Irish, or blacks; half lived in Maryland, with large populations also in New York and Pennsylvania. Presbyterians were chiefly immigrants from Scotland and Ulster who favored the back-country and frontier districts.

Quakers were well established in Pennsylvania, where they controlled the governorship and the legislature for many years. Quakers were also numerous in Rhode Island. Baptists and Methodists were growing rapidly during the First Great Awakening of the 1740s. Many denominations sponsored missions to the local Indians.

== Education ==
Map of higher education in the 13 Colonies immediately prior to the American Revolution.

Higher education was available for young men in the north, and most students were aspiring Protestant ministers. Nine institutions of higher education were chartered during the colonial era. These colleges, known collectively as the colonial colleges were New College (Harvard), the College of William & Mary, Yale College (Yale), the College of New Jersey (Princeton), King's College (Columbia), the College of Philadelphia (University of Pennsylvania), the College of Rhode Island (Brown), Queen's College (Rutgers) and Dartmouth College. The College of William & Mary and Queen's College later became public institutions, while the other institutions account for seven of the eight private Ivy League universities.

Except for the College of William and Mary, these institutions were all located in New England and the Middle Colonies. The southern colonies held the belief that the family had the responsibility of educating their children, mirroring the common belief in Europe. Wealthy families either used tutors and governesses from Britain or sent children to school in England. By the 1700s, university students based in the colonies began to act as tutors.

Most New England towns sponsored public schools for boys, but public schooling was rare elsewhere. Girls were educated at home or by small local private schools, and they had no access to college. Aspiring physicians and lawyers typically learned as apprentices to an established practitioner, although some young men went to medical schools in Scotland.

== Government ==
The three forms of colonial government in 1776 were provincial (royal colony), proprietary, and charter. These governments were all subordinate to the British monarch with no representation in the Parliament of Great Britain. The administration of all British colonies was overseen by the Board of Trade in London beginning late in the 17th century.

The provincial colony was governed by commissions created at the pleasure of the king. A governor and his council were appointed by the crown. The governor was invested with general executive powers and authorized to call a locally elected assembly. The governor's council would sit as an upper house when the assembly was in session, in addition to its role in advising the governor. Assemblies were made up of representatives elected by the freeholders and planters (landowners) of the province. The governor had the power of absolute veto and could prorogue (i.e., delay) and dissolve the assembly. The assembly's role was to make all local laws and ordinances, ensuring that they were not inconsistent with the laws of Britain. In practice, this did not always occur, since many of the provincial assemblies sought to expand their powers and limit those of the governor and crown. Laws could be examined by the British Privy Council or Board of Trade, which also held veto power over legislation. New Hampshire, New York, Virginia, North Carolina, South Carolina, and Georgia were crown colonies. Massachusetts became a crown colony at the end of the 17th century.

Proprietary colonies were governed much as royal colonies, except that lord proprietors appointed the governor rather than the king. They were set up after the English Restoration of 1660 and typically enjoyed greater civil and religious liberty. Pennsylvania (which included Delaware), New Jersey, and Maryland were proprietary colonies.

Charter governments were political corporations created by letters patent, giving the grantees control of the land and the powers of legislative government. The charters provided a fundamental constitution and divided powers among legislative, executive, and judicial functions, with those powers being vested in officials. Massachusetts, Providence Plantation, Rhode Island, Warwick, and Connecticut were charter colonies. The Massachusetts charter was revoked in 1684 and was replaced by a provincial charter that was issued in 1691. Providence Plantations merged with the settlements at Rhode Island and Warwick to form the Colony of Rhode Island and Providence Plantations, which also became a charter colony in 1636.

=== British role ===
After 1680, the imperial government in London took an increasing interest in the affairs of the colonies, which were growing rapidly in population and wealth. In 1680, only Virginia was a royal colony; by 1720, half were under the control of royal governors. These governors were appointees closely tied to the government in London.

Historians before the 1880s emphasized American nationalism. However, scholarship after that time was heavily influenced by the "Imperial school" led by Herbert L. Osgood, George Louis Beer, Charles McLean Andrews, and Lawrence H. Gipson. This viewpoint dominated colonial historiography into the 1940s, and it emphasized and often praised the attention that London gave to all the colonies. In this view, there was never a threat (before the 1770s) that any colony would revolt or seek independence.

=== Political culture ===
Settlers did not come to the American colonies with the intention of creating a democratic system; yet they quickly created a broad electorate. The 13 colonies had no hereditary aristocrats, as in Europe. There were no rich gentry who owned all the farmland and rented it out to tenants, as in England and in the Dutch settlements in upstate New York. Instead, there was a political system of local control that was governed by men elected in fair elections. The colonies offered a broader base than Britain or indeed any other country. Any property owner could vote for members of the lower house of the legislature. Governors were appointed in London but colonists elected the governor in Connecticut and Rhode Island. Women, children, indentured servants, and slaves were subsumed under the interest of the family head and did not have a vote or a voice. Indians and free blacks were politically outside the system and usually could not vote. Voters were required to hold an "interest" in society; as the South Carolina legislature said in 1716, "it is necessary and reasonable, that none but such persons will have an interest in the Province should be capable to elect members of the Commons House of Assembly". The main legal criterion for having an "interest" was ownership of real estate. In Britain, 19 out of 20 men were controlled politically by their landlords. London insisted on this requirement for the colonies, telling governors to exclude from the ballot men who were not freeholders—that is, those who did not own land. However, in most places, good farmland was cheap and so widely owned that 50% to 80% of the men were eligible to vote.

According to historian Donald Radcliffe:

The right to vote had always been extraordinarily widespread—at least among adult white males--even before the country gained its independence....Enfranchisement varied greatly by location. There certainly were communities, particularly newly settled communities where land was inexpensive, in which 70 or 80 percent of all white men were enfranchised. Yet there were also locales...where the percentages were far lower, closer to 40 or 50 percent....On the whole, the franchise was far more widespread than it was in England, yet as the revolution approached, the rate of property ownership was falling, and the proportion of adult white males who were eligible to vote was probably less than 60 percent.

The colonial political culture emphasized deference, so that local notables were the men who ran and were chosen. But sometimes they competed with each other and had to appeal to the common man for votes. There were no political parties, and would-be legislators formed ad hoc coalitions of their families, friends, and neighbors. Election day brought in all the men from the countryside to the county seat or town center to make merry, politick, shake hands with the grandees, meet old friends, and hear the speeches—all the while toasting, eating, treating, tippling, and gambling. They voted by shouting their choice to the clerk, as supporters cheered or booed. In Virginia candidate George Washington spent £39 for treats for his supporters. The candidates knew that they had to "swill the planters with bumbo" (rum). Elections were carnivals where all men were equal for one day and traditional restraints were relaxed.

Voting was voluntary, and typically about half the men eligible to vote turned out on election day. Turnout was usually higher in Pennsylvania and New York, where long-standing factions based on ethnic and religious groups mobilized supporters at a higher rate. New York and Rhode Island developed long-lasting two-faction systems that held together for years at the colony level, but they did not reach into local affairs. The factions were based on the personalities of a few leaders and an array of family connections, and they had little basis in policy or ideology. Elsewhere, the political scene was in a constant whirl, based on personality rather than long-lived factions or serious disputes on issues.

The colonies were independent of one another before 1774; indeed, all the colonies began as separate and unique settlements or plantations. Further, efforts had failed to form a colonial union through the Albany Congress of 1754 led by Benjamin Franklin. The thirteen all had well-established systems of self-government and elections based on the Rights of Englishmen which they were determined to protect from imperial interference.

=== Economic policy ===
The British Empire at the time was operated under the mercantile system, where all trade was concentrated within the Empire, and trade with other empires was forbidden. The goal was to enrich Britain, its merchants, and its government. Whether the policy was good for the colonists was not an issue in London, but Americans became increasingly restive with mercantilist policies.

Mercantilism meant that the government and the merchants became partners to increase political power and private wealth, to the exclusion of other empires. The government protected its merchants—and kept others out—by trade barriers, regulations, and subsidies to domestic industries to maximize exports from and minimize imports to the realm. The government had to fight smuggling, which became a favorite American technique in the 18th century to circumvent the restrictions on trading with the French, Spanish, or Dutch. The tactic used by mercantilism was to run trade surpluses, so that gold and silver would pour into London. The government took its share through duties and taxes, with the remainder going to merchants in Britain. The government spent much of its revenue on a superb Royal Navy, which not only protected the British colonies but threatened the colonies of the other empires, and sometimes seized them. Thus, the British Navy captured New Amsterdam (New York) in 1664. The colonies were captive markets for British industry, and the goal was to enrich the mother country. Colonial commodities were shipped on British ships to the mother country where Britain sold them to Europe reaping the benefits of the export trade. Finished goods were manufactured in Britain and sold in the colonies, or imported by Britain for retail to the colonies, profiting the mother country. Like other New World colonial empires, the British empire's commodity production was dependent on slave labor; as observed in 1720s Britain, "all this great increase in our treasure proceeds chiefly from the labour of negroes" in Britain's colonies.

Britain implemented mercantilism by trying to block American trade with the French, Spanish, or Dutch empires using the Navigation Acts, which Americans avoided as often as they could. The royal officials responded to smuggling with open-ended search warrants (Writs of Assistance). In 1761, Boston lawyer James Otis argued that the writs violated the constitutional rights of the colonists. He lost the case, but John Adams later wrote, "Then and there the child Independence was born."

However, the colonists took pains to argue that they did not oppose British regulation of their external trade; they only opposed legislation that affected them internally.

==== Transportation ====
Transportation was primarily done by water, although a road network did exist in the colonies. As transportation was often done by water, a sizable shipbuilding industry developed, especially in New England. Rivers were utilized for transportation purposes.

Most roads existed along the Atlantic Coast and connected other cities. Some individual colonies built their own road networks. By 1764, a stagecoach route existed between Philadelphia and New York City, and by 1773, the stagecoach network extended to Providence and Boston.

== Other British colonies ==
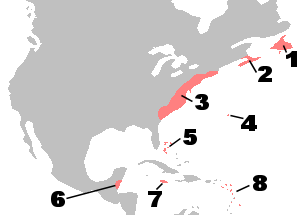
Some of the British colonies in North America, c. 1750: 1. Newfoundland; 2. Nova Scotia; 3. Thirteen Colonies; 4. Bermuda; 5. Bahamas; 6. British Honduras; 7. Jamaica; 8. British Leeward Islands and Barbados

Besides the grouping that became known as the "thirteen colonies", Britain in the late-18th century had another dozen colonial possessions in the New World surrounding the 13 colonies. The British West Indies, Newfoundland, the Province of Quebec, Nova Scotia, Prince Edward Island, Bermuda, and East and West Florida remained loyal to the British crown throughout the war (although Spain reacquired Florida as the war was ending, and in 1821 sold it to the United States). Several of the other colonies evinced a certain degree of sympathy with the Patriot cause, but their geographical isolation and the dominance of British naval power precluded any effective participation. The British crown had only recently acquired several of those lands, and many of the issues facing the Thirteen Colonies did not apply to them, especially in the case of Quebec and Florida.

== Historiography ==
The first British Empire centered on the Thirteen Colonies, which attracted large numbers of settlers from Britain. The "Imperial School" between the 1900s and 1930s took a favorable view of the benefits of empire, emphasizing its successful economic integration. The Imperial School included such historians as Herbert L. Osgood, George Louis Beer, Charles M. Andrews, and Lawrence Gipson.

The shock of Britain's defeat in 1783 caused a radical revision of British policies on colonialism, thereby producing what historians call the end of the First British Empire, even though Britain still controlled Canada and some islands in the West Indies. Ashley Jackson writes:

The first British Empire was largely destroyed by the loss of the American colonies, followed by a "swing to the east" and the foundation of a second British Empire based on commercial and territorial expansion in South Asia.

Much of the historiography concerns the reasons why the Americans rebelled in the 1770s and successfully broke away. Since the 1960s, the mainstream of historiography has emphasized the growth of American consciousness and nationalism and the colonial republican value-system, in opposition to the aristocratic viewpoint of British leaders.

Historians in recent decades have mostly used one of three approaches to analyze the American Revolution:

- The Atlantic history view places North American events in a broader context, including the French Revolution and Haitian Revolution. It tends to integrate the historiographies of the American Revolution and the British Empire.
- The new social history approach looks at community social structure to find issues that became magnified into colonial cleavages.
- The ideological approach centers on republicanism in the Thirteen Colonies. The ideas of republicanism dictated that the United States would have no royalty or aristocracy or national church. They did permit continuation of the British common law, which American lawyers and jurists understood, approved of, and used in their everyday practice. Historians have examined how the rising American legal profession adapted the British common law to incorporate republicanism by selective revision of legal customs and by introducing more choice for courts.

== See also ==
- American Revolutionary War § Prelude to revolution
- British colonization of the Americas
- Colonial American military history
- Colonial government in the Thirteen Colonies
- Colonial history of the United States
- Colonial South and the Chesapeake
- Credit in the Thirteen Colonies
- Cuisine of the Thirteen Colonies
- History of the United States (1776–1789)
- Shipbuilding in the American colonies
- United Colonies, the name used by the Second Continental Congress in 1775–1776

== Bibliography ==
- Galloway, Joseph (1780). Cool thoughts on the consequences of American independence, &c. printed for J. Wilkie. London. ISBN 978-0-6652-05965. OCLC 24301390. OL 19213819M – via Internet Archive.
- Greene, Jack P. & Pole, J. R., eds. (2003). A Companion to the American Revolution (2nd ed.). Wiley. ISBN 9781405116749.
- Keyssar, Alexander. The right to vote: the contested history of democracy in the United States (2000) online
- Landsman, Ned C. Crossroads of Empire: The Middle Colonies in British North America (2011).
- Mays, Terry M. (2016). Historical Dictionary of the American Revolution. Rowman & Littlefield. ISBN 978-1-5381-1972-3.
- Meinig, Donald William (1986). The Shaping of America: Atlantic America, 1492–1800. Yale University Press. ISBN 9780300082906.
- Middlekauff, Robert (1966). Winks, Robin (ed.). The American Continental Colonies in the Empire. The Historiography of the British Empire–Commonwealth: Trends, Interpretations and Resources. Duke University Press. ISBN 9780822301936.
- Middlekauff, Robert (2005) [1982]. The Glorious Cause: the American Revolution, 1763–1789. Oup USA. ISBN 9780195162479.
- Morgan, Edmund Sears (1953). The Stamp act crisis; prologue to revolution. University of North Carolina Press.
- Ratcliffe, Donald. "The right to vote and the rise of democracy, 1787–1828." Journal of the Early Republic 33.2 (2013): 219–254. online Archived June 2, 2023, at the Wayback Machine
- Richter, Daniel (2011). Before the Revolution: America's ancient pasts. Harvard University Press. ISBN 9780674055803.
- Rodriguez, Junius P. (2007). Slavery in the United States: A Social, Political, and Historical Encyclopedia. ABC-CLIO. ISBN 978-1-8510-95445.
- South Carolina. Convention (1862). Journal of the Convention of the people of South Carolina. published by order of the Convention. Columbia, South Carolina: R. W. Gibbes. p. 461. OCLC 1047483138 – via Internet Archive.
- Taylor, Alan (2002). American Colonies. Penguin. ISBN 9780142002100.
- Taylor, Alan (2016). American Revolutions: A Continental History, 1750–1804. W.W. Norton & Co. ISBN 9780393253870.
- ——; Ray, Michael (2015). American Revolution. Encyclopedia Britannica.
