= Middle Colonies =

Subset of British American Thirteen Colonies

U.S. States: Delaware; New Jersey; New York; Pennsylvania

The Middle Colonies were a subset of the Thirteen Colonies in British America, located between the New England Colonies and the Southern Colonies. Along with the Chesapeake Colonies, this area now roughly makes up the Mid-Atlantic states.

Much of the area was part of the Dutch colony of New Netherland until the British exerted their control over the region. The British captured much of the area in their war with the Dutch around 1664, and the majority of the conquered land became the Province of New York. The Duke of York and the King of England would later grant others ownership of the land which would become the Province of New Jersey and the Province of Pennsylvania. The Delaware Colony later separated from Pennsylvania, which was founded by William Penn.

The Middle Colonies had much fertile soil, which allowed the area to become a major exporter of wheat and other grains. The lumber and shipbuilding industries were also successful in the Middle Colonies because of the abundant forests, and Pennsylvania was moderately successful in the textile and iron industries. The Middle Colonies were the most ethnically and religiously diverse British colonies in North America with settlers from England, Scotland, Ireland, the Netherlands, and German states. Farm land was both productive and much less expensive than in Europe. Later settlers included members of various Protestant denominations, which were protected in the Middle Colonies by written freedom of religion laws. This tolerance was very unusual and distinct from the situation in other British colonies.

== History ==
The Middle Colonies were explored by Henry Hudson for the Dutch East India Company in 1609, sailing up the Hudson River to present-day Albany, New York, and along the Delaware Bay. The Dutch further explored and charted the area in multiple voyages between 1610 and 1616; the first Dutch settlements were built in 1613 and the name New Netherland appeared on maps from 1614 on. With Swedish funding, the third governor of New Netherland later founded the colony of New Sweden in the region around Delaware Bay in 1638. This area was reclaimed by the Dutch in 1655. In October 1664, as a prelude to the Second Anglo-Dutch War, the English largely conquered this land from the Dutch. Though the war ended in a Dutch victory in 1667, the English retained New Netherland and renamed it New York after the English King's brother, the Duke of York, who had co-instigated the war for personal gain and had commanded the attack on New Netherland. In 1673, the Dutch retook the area but relinquished it under the Treaty of Westminster (1674), ending the Third Anglo-Dutch War the next year.

== Province of New Jersey ==
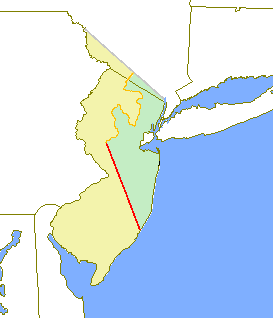
A map showing the borders of West New Jersey (left) and East New Jersey (right)

King Charles II renamed the land west of the Hudson River in New Jersey, and gave the region between New England and Maryland to his brother, the Duke of York, who later became King James II of England, as a proprietary colony. James II later granted the land between the Hudson River and the Delaware River to two friends who had been loyal to him through the English Civil War: Sir George Carteret and Lord Berkeley of Stratton. This land grant became the Province of New Jersey.

In 1665, the Concession and Agreement was written in an effort to entice settlers to New Jersey. This document provided for religious freedom, no taxes without assembly approval, and a governor appointed by the proprietors. The first governor appointed in this way was Philip Carteret, who founded Elizabethtown. Colonists were required to pay annual quit-rent taxes. On March 18, 1674, after encountering difficulty collecting the taxes, Lord Berkeley sold his share in the colony to Edward Byllynge, a Quaker businessman from London. This sale divided New Jersey into East Jersey and West Jersey; however, the border between the two was not agreed upon until the Quintipartite Deed in 1676. From 1701 to 1765, colonists skirmished in the New York-New Jersey Line War over disputed colonial boundaries.

On April 15, 1702, Queen Anne united West and East Jersey into one Royal Colony, the Province of New Jersey. Edward Hyde, 3rd Earl of Clarendon became the royal colony's first governor. After Hyde was recalled to England in 1708 over charges of graft, bribery, and corruption, the governor of New York was charged to also preside over New Jersey. Finally, in 1738, King George II appointed a separate governor, Lewis Morris, to run New Jersey.

The Provincial Congress of New Jersey, made up of elected delegates, formed in January 1776 to govern the colony. The Congress had Royal Governor William Franklin arrested on June 15, declaring him "an enemy to the liberties of this country". On July 2, 1776, New Jersey enacted the New Jersey State Constitution, soon after having empowered delegates to the Continental Congress, on June 21, to join in a declaration of independence. The United States Declaration of Independence ended their colonial status.

== Province of Pennsylvania ==
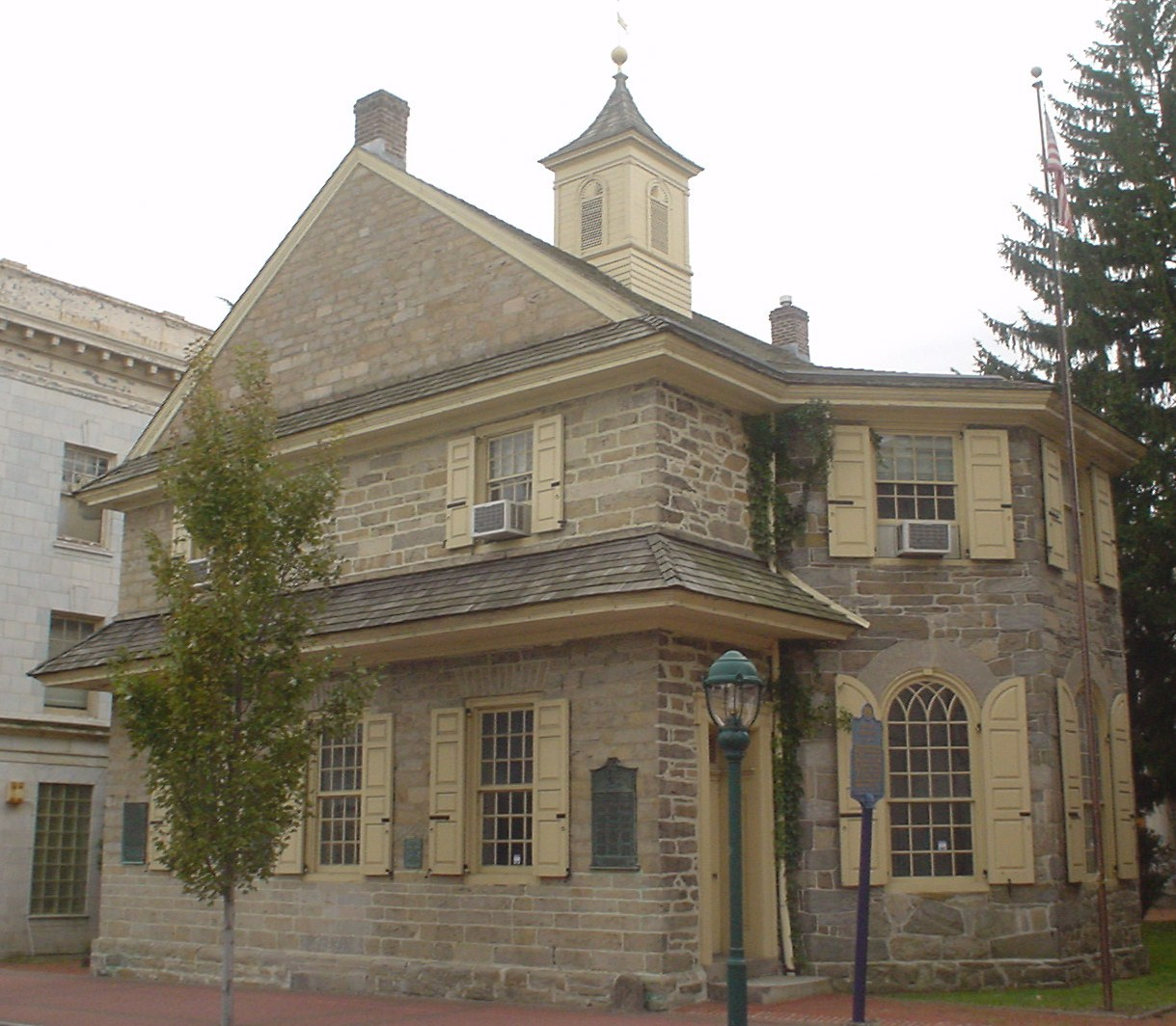
Chester Courthouse in Pennsylvania was built in 1724.

King Charles II granted the land for the Pennsylvania Colony to William Penn on March 4, 1681 as payment for a debt the crown owed his family. Penn wrote the Frame of Government of Pennsylvania before departing for the colony, which called for religious tolerance towards many groups, including the Religious Society of Friends and local natives. As a proprietary colony, Penn governed Pennsylvania, yet its citizens were still subject to the English crown and laws. Penn's cousin William Markham served as the first colonial deputy governor.

Demarcated by the 42nd parallel north and 39th parallel north, Pennsylvania was bordered by the Delaware River and the colonies of New York, Maryland, and New Jersey. In 1704, Dutch land given to Penn by the Duke of York was separated and once again became part of the Delaware Colony. From 1692 to 1694, revolution in England deprived Penn of the governance of his colony. The Pennsylvania Assembly took this opportunity to request expanded power for elected officials, led by David Lloyd. Upon visiting the colony in 1669 and 1701, Penn eventually agreed to allow their Charter of Privileges to be added to the constitution. When the British banned western expansion in 1764, fighting among colonists and against the natives swelled. In 1773, Arthur St. Clair ordered the arrest of a Virginian officer who was commanding troops against armed settlers loyal to Pennsylvania. Pennsylvanian revolutionary sentiment continued to grow, and Philadelphia, the largest city in America, soon became the meeting place of the Continental Congress. The publication of the Pennsylvania Constitution of 1776 by locally elected revolutionaries concluded the history of the Colony, and began the Commonwealth of Pennsylvania.

== Province of New York ==
The first Dutch settlements in the New York area appeared around 1613. The English captured the New Netherland Colony from the Dutch in 1664, renaming it the Province of New York after the King's brother, the Duke of York (later King James II). The Dutch recaptured the colony in July 1673 during the Third Anglo-Dutch War, but gave it back to the English under the Treaty of Westminster in exchange for Suriname. The Duke of York never governed the colony himself: he instead appointed governors, councils, and other officers to run the government. Richard Nicolls served as the first governor of New York.

In 1665, the Province of New Jersey split from New York; however, the New York-New Jersey Line War continued until the final borders were decided in 1769, and approved by the legislatures and the King in 1772 and 1773 respectively. A Colonial Assembly convened in October 1683, making New York the last colony to have an assembly. A constitution was drafted and passed on October 30, 1683, giving the colonists many rights, including the rights to no taxation without representation. However, upon learning of the constitution, James II declared it void.

When the Duke of York became King James II of England, New York became a royal province. In May 1688 the province briefly became part of the Dominion of New England. When James II was overthrown, the citizens of New York rebelled against the Royal Governor in Leisler's Rebellion. When Henry Sloughter became governor in March 1691, the rebellion was crushed and its leader, Jacob Leisler was arrested, tried, and executed for treason. New York's charter and constitution were reinstated soon after. In April 1775, American patriots formed the New York Provincial Congress to replace the assembly. Governor William Tryon and all royal officials were forced from the colony on October 19, 1775. Colonial status ended for the new state with the United States Declaration of Independence in July 1776.

== Delaware Colony ==
Delaware changed hands between the Dutch and Swedes between 1631 and 1655. The Dutch maintained control of Delaware until 1664, when Sir Robert Carr took New Amstel for the Duke of York, renaming it New Castle. A Deputy of the Duke governed Delaware from 1664 to 1682. When William Penn received his land grant of Pennsylvania in 1681, he received the Delaware area from the Duke of York, and dubbed them "The Three Lower Counties on the Delaware River". In 1701, after he had troubles governing the ethnically diverse Delaware territory, Penn agreed to allow them a separate colonial assembly.

== Geography ==
The partly unglaciated Middle Colonies enjoyed fertile soil vastly different from the nearby New England Colonies, which contained more rocky soil. Because of the large grain exports resulting from this soil, the colonies came to be known as the Bread Basket Colonies. Pennsylvania became a leading exporter of wheat, corn, rye, hemp, and flax, making it the leading food producer in the colonies, and later states, between the years of 1725 and 1840. Broad navigable rivers of relaxed current like the Susquehanna River, the Delaware River, and the Hudson River attracted diverse business. Fur trappers moved along these rivers, and there was enough flow to enable milling with water wheel power.

== Industry ==
Abundant forests attracted both the lumbering and shipbuilding industries to the Middle Colonies. These industries, along with the presence of deep river estuaries, led to the appearance of important ports like New York and Philadelphia. While the Middle Colonies had far more industry than the Southern Colonies, it still did not rival the industry of New England. In Pennsylvania, sawmills and gristmills were abundant, and the textile industry grew quickly. The colony also became a major producer of pig iron and its products, including the Pennsylvania long rifle and the Conestoga wagon. Other important industries included printing, publishing, and the related industry of papermaking.

== Politics ==
The Middle Colonies' political groups began as small groups with narrowly focused goals. These coalitions eventually grew into diverse and large political organizations, evolving especially during the French and Indian War.

The Middle Colonies were generally run by Royal or Proprietary Governors and elected Colonial Assemblies. Many Middle Colony constitutions guaranteed freedom of religion and forbade taxation without representation. Royal governors were arrested or overthrown on more than one occasion, most notably when New Jersey arrested its governor and during Leisler's Rebellion in New York. Growing unrest in the Middle Colonies eventually led the region to become the meeting place for the Continental Congress, and a center for revolution. However, there were numerous pockets of neutrals and Loyalists.

== Demographics ==
The Middle Colonies tended to mix aspects of the New England and Southern Colonies. Landholdings were generally farms of 40 to 160 acres (16–65 hectares), owned by the family that worked it. In New York's Hudson Valley, however, the Dutch patroons operated very large landed estates and rented land to tenant farmers.

Ethnically, the Middle Colonies were more diverse than the other British colonial regions in North America and tended to be more socially tolerant. For example, in New York, any foreigner professing Christianity was awarded citizenship, leading to a more diverse populace. As a consequence, early German settlements in the Americas concentrated in the Middle Colonies region. Indentured servitude was especially common in Pennsylvania, New Jersey, and New York in the 18th century, though fewer worked in agriculture.

German immigrants favored the Middle Colonies. German immigration greatly increased around 1717, and many immigrants began coming from the Rhineland. They were erroneously labeled the Pennsylvania Dutch (the German word for German is "Deutsch"), and comprised one-third of the population by the time of the American Revolution. The industry and farming skills they brought with them helped solidify the Middle Colonies' prosperity. They were noted for tight-knit religious communities, mostly Lutheran but also including many smaller sects such as the Moravians, Mennonites and Amish

The Scotch-Irish began immigrating to the Middle Colonies in waves after 1717. They primarily pushed farther into the western frontier of the colonies, where they repeatedly confronted the Indians. Other groups included the French Huguenots, Welsh, Dutch, Swedes, Swiss, and Scots Highlanders.

=== English colonists ===
When the English took direct control of the Middle Colonies around 1664, many Quakers from Rhode Island had already been pushed into the region by Puritans, while Episcopalian businessmen settled in Philadelphia and New York City.

Welsh Quakers, Baptists and Methodists settled in the Welsh Tract of Pennsylvania. While some Welsh colonists like Roger Williams, left to found Rhode Island, Anne Hutchinson founded a seed settlement in New York. Rhode Island was not initially counted as part of New England, having been excluded from the New England Confederation, but later joined the Dominion of New England. Thus, the definition of the Middle Colonies sometimes changed and overlapped with Rhode Island's colonial boundaries. After joining the Dominion of New England, however, Rhode Island was permanently thought of as a New England colony. New York's initial possession of parts of Maine ensured a close relationship with other New England colonies like Vermont and a continuing New England influence in the colony.

Both William Penn and the Lords Baltimore encouraged Irish Protestant immigration, hoping they could obtain indentured servants to work on their estates and on colonial developments. Often areas of the Middle Colonies displayed prevalent Irish cultural influence.

=== Labor ===
Labor was always in short supply. The most common solution was indentured servitude of young whites. These were teenagers in Britain or Germany whose parents arranged for them to work for families in the colonies until age 21, in exchange for their ocean passage. The great majority became farmers or farm wives. By the mid-eighteenth century, African American slaves comprised 12% of the population of New York. Most were house servants in Manhattan, or farm workers on Dutch estates.

=== Religion ===
The Middle Colonies were the religiously diverse part of the British Empire, with a high degree of tolerance. The Penn family were Quakers, and the colony became a favorite destination for that group as well as German Lutherans, German Reformed and numerous small sects such as Mennonites, Amish and Moravian, not to mention Scotch Irish Presbyterians. The Dutch Reformed were strong in upstate New York and New Jersey, and Congregationalists were important in Long Island. The First Great Awakening invigorated religiosity and helped stimulate the growth of Congregational, Methodist and Baptist churches. Non-British colonists included Dutch Calvinist, Swedish Lutherans, Palatine Mennonites, and the Amish. There was a Jewish community already established in New York from 1654 (when it was still New Amsterdam), and Jews settled in what became Pennsylvania from 1655.

== See also ==
- Mid-Atlantic
- New England Colonies
- Southern Colonies
- Chesapeake Colonies
- Colonial history of the United States

== Historiography ==
- Bodle, Wayne. "Themes and Directions in Middles Colonies Historiography, 1980–1994", William and Mary Quarterly, July 1994, Vol. 51 Issue 3, pp. 355–88. JSTOR 2947435.
- Bodle, Wayne. "The "Myth of the Middle Colonies" Reconsidered: The Process of Regionalization in Early America", Pennsylvania Magazine of History and Biography, Vol. 113, No. 4 (Oct. 1989), pp. 527–548. JSTOR 20092405.
- Greenberg, Douglas. "The Middle Colonies in Recent American Historiography", William and Mary Quarterly, July 1979, Vol. 36 Issue 3, pp. 396–427. JSTOR 1943383.
- Richter, Daniel K. "Mid-Atlantic Colonies, RIP." Pennsylvania History 82.3 (2015): 260-281. online
