= Wet season =

Yearly period of high rainfall

The rainfall distribution by month in Cairns, Australia

The wet season (sometimes called the rainy season or monsoon season) is the time of year when most of a region's average annual rainfall occurs. Generally, the season lasts at least one month. Areas with wet seasons are dispersed across portions of the tropics and subtropics.

Under the Köppen climate classification, for tropical climates, a wet season month is defined as a month where average precipitation is 60 millimetres (2.4 in) or more. Dry and rainy months are characteristic of tropical seasonal forests: in contrast to tropical rainforests, which do not have dry or wet seasons, since their rainfall is equally distributed throughout the year. Some areas with pronounced rainy seasons will see a break in rainfall mid-season, when the Intertropical Convergence Zone or monsoon trough moves to higher latitudes in the middle of the warm season.

The wet season takes place on warmer months in tropical savanna and tropical monsoon climates, where precipitation falls mainly during the late afternoon and early evening. Meanwhile, Mediterranean climates have a wet season during the colder months.

In the wet season, air quality improves, fresh water quality improves, and vegetation grows substantially, leading to crop yields late in the season. Rivers overflow their banks, and some animals retreat to higher ground. Soil nutrients diminish and erosion increases. The incidence of malaria and dengue increases in areas where the rainy season coincides with high temperatures, particularly in tropical areas. Some animals have adaptation and survival strategies for the wet season. Often, the previous dry season leads to food shortages in the wet season, as the crops have yet to mature. Crops which can be successfully planted during the wet or rainy season are cassava, maize, groundnut, millet, rice and yam.

The counterpart to the tropical wet season in temperate regions is spring or autumn.

The term green season is also sometimes used as a euphemism by tourist authorities, in reference to the United States dollar banknotes.

== Character of the rainfall ==
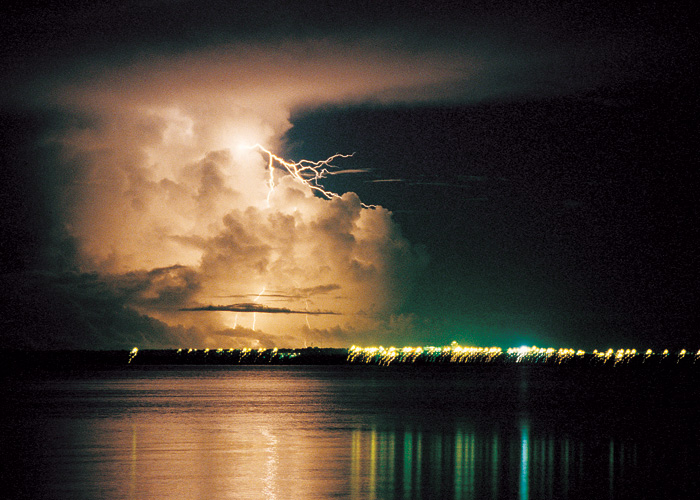
A wet-season storm at night in Darwin, Australia

In areas where the heavy rainfall is associated with a wind shift, the wet season is known as the monsoon season. Many tropical and subtropical climates experience monsoon rainfall patterns. Rainfall in the wet season is mainly due to daytime heating, which leads to diurnal thunderstorm activity within a pre-existing moist airmass, so the rain mainly falls in late afternoon and early evening in savanna and monsoon regions.

Much of the total rainfall each day occurs in the first minutes of the downpour, before the storms mature into their stratiform stage. Most places have only one wet season, but areas of the tropics can have two wet seasons, because the monsoon trough, or Intertropical Convergence Zone, can pass over locations in the tropics twice per year. However, since rain forests have rainfall spread evenly through the year, they do not have a wet season.

== Areas affected ==
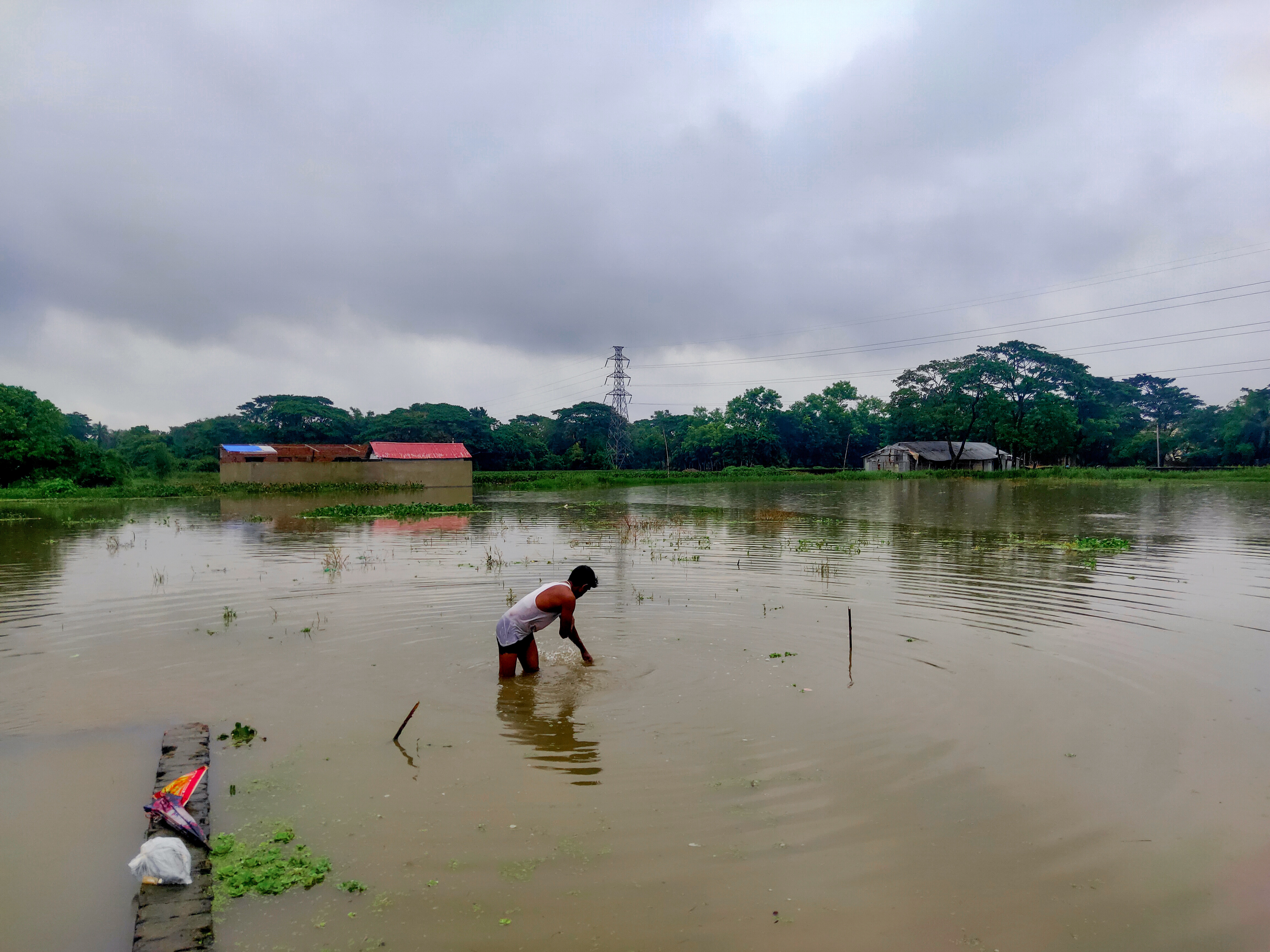
Monsoon floods in Bangladesh

Long-term mean precipitation by month

Areas with a savanna climate in Sub-Saharan Africa, such as Ghana, Burkina Faso, Darfur in western Sudan, Eritrea, Ethiopia, and Botswana have a distinct rainy season. Also subtropical areas like Florida, South and Southeast Texas, and southern Louisiana in the United States have a rainy season. Monsoon regions include the Indian subcontinent, Southeast Asia (including Indonesia and Philippines), northern sections of Australia, Polynesia, Central America, western and southern Mexico, the Desert Southwest of the United States, southern Guyana, and northeast Brazil.

Northern Guyana has two wet seasons: one in early spring and the other in early winter. In western Africa, there are two rainy seasons across southern sections, but only one across the north. Within the Mediterranean climate regime, the west coast of the United States, the southwest coast of Australia and South Africa, the Mediterranean coastline of Italy, Spain, Greece, Lebanon, Syria, Algeria, Morocco, Tunisia, and Turkey, as well as areas further inland in Western Asia which include Jordan, Northern Iraq and most parts of Iran, experience a wet season in the winter months. Similarly, the wet season in the Negev Desert of Israel extends from October through May. At the boundary between the Mediterranean and monsoon climates lies the Sonoran Desert, which receives the two rainy seasons associated with each climate regime.

The wet season is known by many different local names throughout the world. For example, in Mexico it is known as "storm season". Different names are given to the various short "seasons" of the year by the First Nations of Northern Australia: the wet season typically experienced there from December to March is called Gudjewg. The precise meaning of the word is disputed, although it is widely accepted to relate to the severe thunderstorms, flooding, and abundant vegetation growth commonly experienced at this time.

== Effects ==
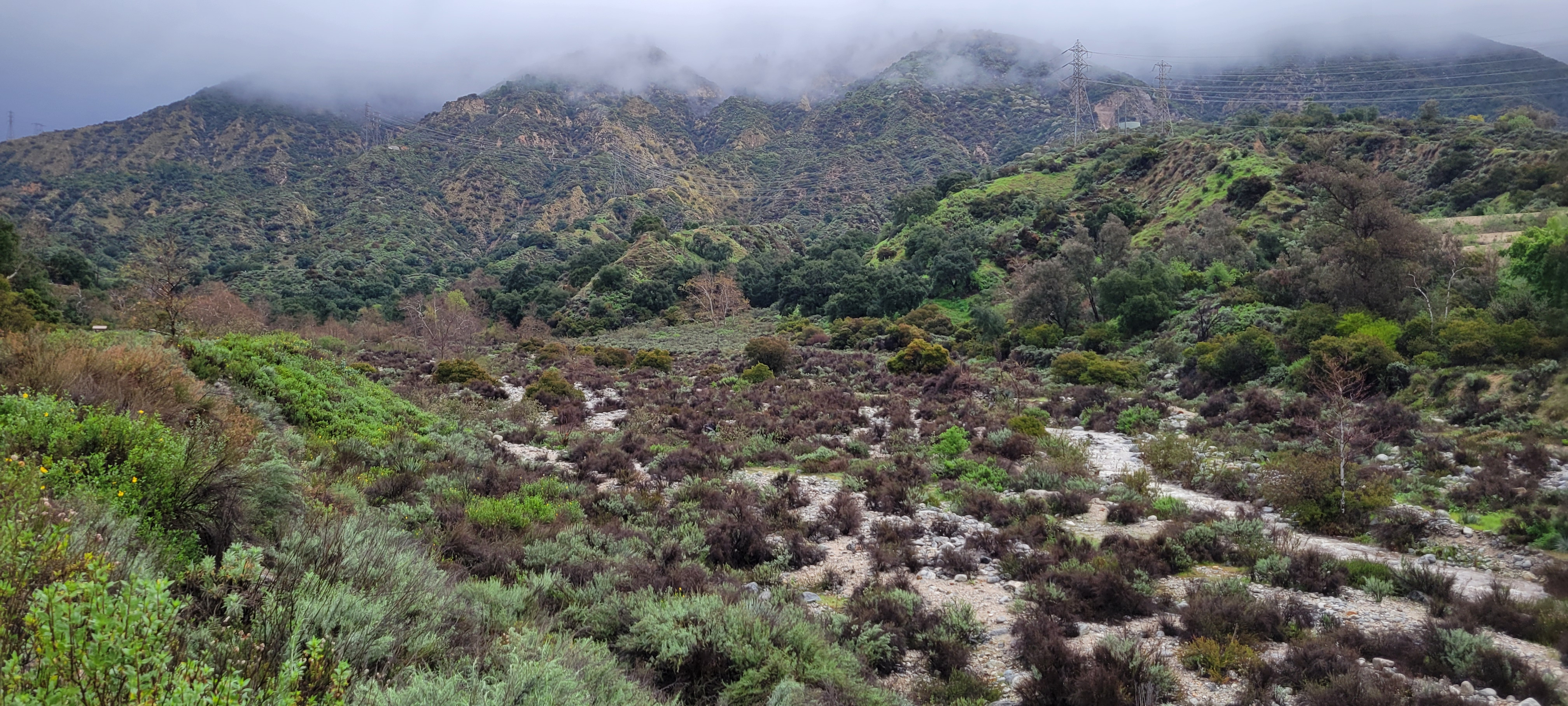
A normally dry, chaparral ecosystem following a successful wet season in Southern California

In tropical areas, when the monsoon arrives, high daytime temperatures drop and overnight low temperatures increase, thus reducing diurnal temperature variation. During the wet season, a combination of heavy rainfall and, in some places such as Hong Kong, an onshore wind, improve air quality.

In Brazil, the wet season is correlated with weaker trade winds off the ocean. The pH level of water becomes more balanced due to the charging of local aquifers during the wet season. Water also softens, as the concentration of dissolved materials reduces during the rainy season. Erosion is also increased during rainy periods.

Arroyos that are dry at other times of the year fill with runoff, in some cases with water as deep as 10 feet (3.0 m). Leaching of soils during periods of heavy rainfall depletes nutrients. The higher runoff from land masses affects nearby ocean areas, which are more stratified, or less mixed, due to stronger surface currents forced by the heavy rainfall runoff.

=== Floods ===
High rainfall can cause widespread flooding, which can lead to landslides and mudflows in mountainous areas. Such floods cause rivers to burst their banks and submerge homes. The Ghaggar-Hakra River, which only flows during India's monsoon season, can flood and severely damage local crops. Floods can be exacerbated by fires that occurred during the previous dry season, which cause soils which are sandy or composed of loam to become hydrophobic, or water repellent. In various ways governments may help people deal with wet season floods. Flood plain mapping identifies which areas are more prone to flooding. Instructions on controlling erosion through outreach are also provided by telephone or the internet.

== Life adaptations ==
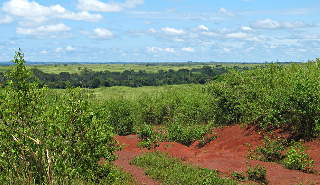
Equatorial savanna in the East Province of Cameroon

=== Humans ===
The wet season is the main period of vegetation growth within the Savanna climate regime. However, this also means that wet season is a time for food shortages before crops reach their full maturity. This causes seasonal weight changes for people in developing countries, with a drop occurring during the wet season until the time of the first harvest, when weights rebound. Malaria incidence increases during periods of high temperature and heavy rainfall. Heavy rains can wash out or flood road networks, causing isolated areas to require supply by boat or airplane.

=== Animals ===
Cows calve, or give birth, at the beginning of the wet season. The onset of the rainy season signals the departure of the monarch butterfly from Mexico. Tropical species of butterflies show larger dot markings on their wings to fend off possible predators and are more active during the wet season than the dry season. Within the tropics and warmer areas of the subtropics, decreased salinity of near shore wetlands due to the rains causes an increase in crocodile nesting. Other species, such as the arroyo toad, spawn within the couple of months after the seasonal rains. Armadillos and rattlesnakes seek higher ground.

== See also ==
- Season of the Inundation (Akhet)
- East Asian rainy season
- Dry season
