= Da-Qing Bank =

Central bank of the Qing dynasty

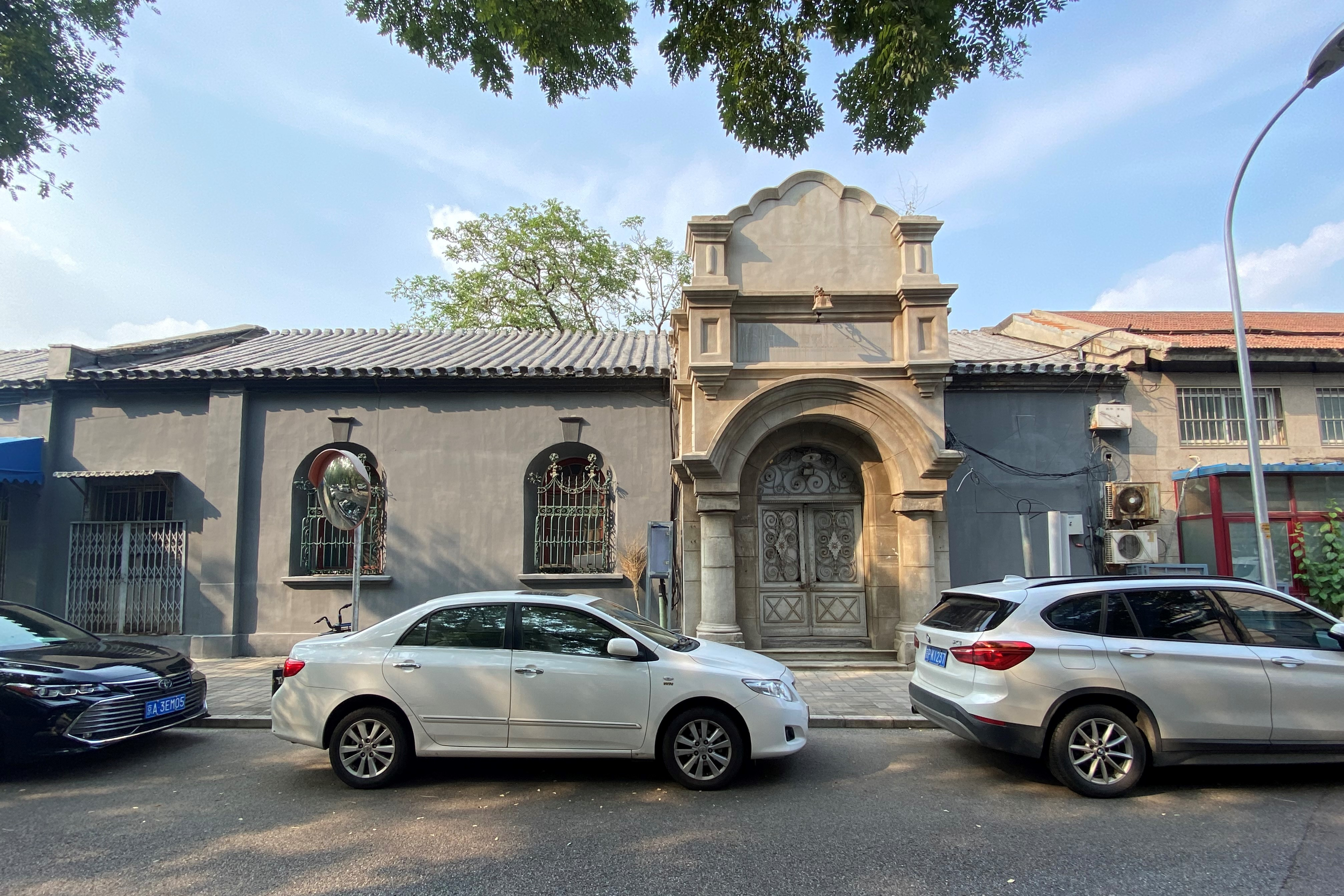
Former street entrance to the Da-Qing Bank head office complex on West Jiaomin Lane in Beijing

The Da-Qing Bank (simplified Chinese: 大清银行; traditional Chinese: 大清銀行, lit. 'Bank of Great Qing', Wade–Giles romanization Ta-Ching Bank), also known as the Great Qing Bank, or previously Hubu Bank (or Hupu Bank), was a state-controlled entity established by the Qing dynasty in 1905 to serve as Imperial China's first central bank. It issued banknotes that were intended to unify the Qing dynasty's currency system. In 1912 following the Xinhai Revolution, the Bank of China was created to take over the role of the Da-Qing Bank, which was liquidated in an orderly manner.

== Name ==
The bank's name "Da Qing yinhang" literally translates as "Great Qing Bank" or "Bank of the Great Qing", with "Great Qing" being synonymous with the Chinese Empire under the Qing dynasty. Western scholars commonly use the name Da-Qing Bank or Great Qing Bank.

From 1905 to 1908, the bank's full name was name was "Great Qing Bank of the Ministry of Revenue" (Da Qing hubu yinhang, Chinese: 大清戶部銀行), also sometimes referred to in English as "Hubu Bank" or (in Wades-Giles romanization) "Hupu Bank".

== History ==
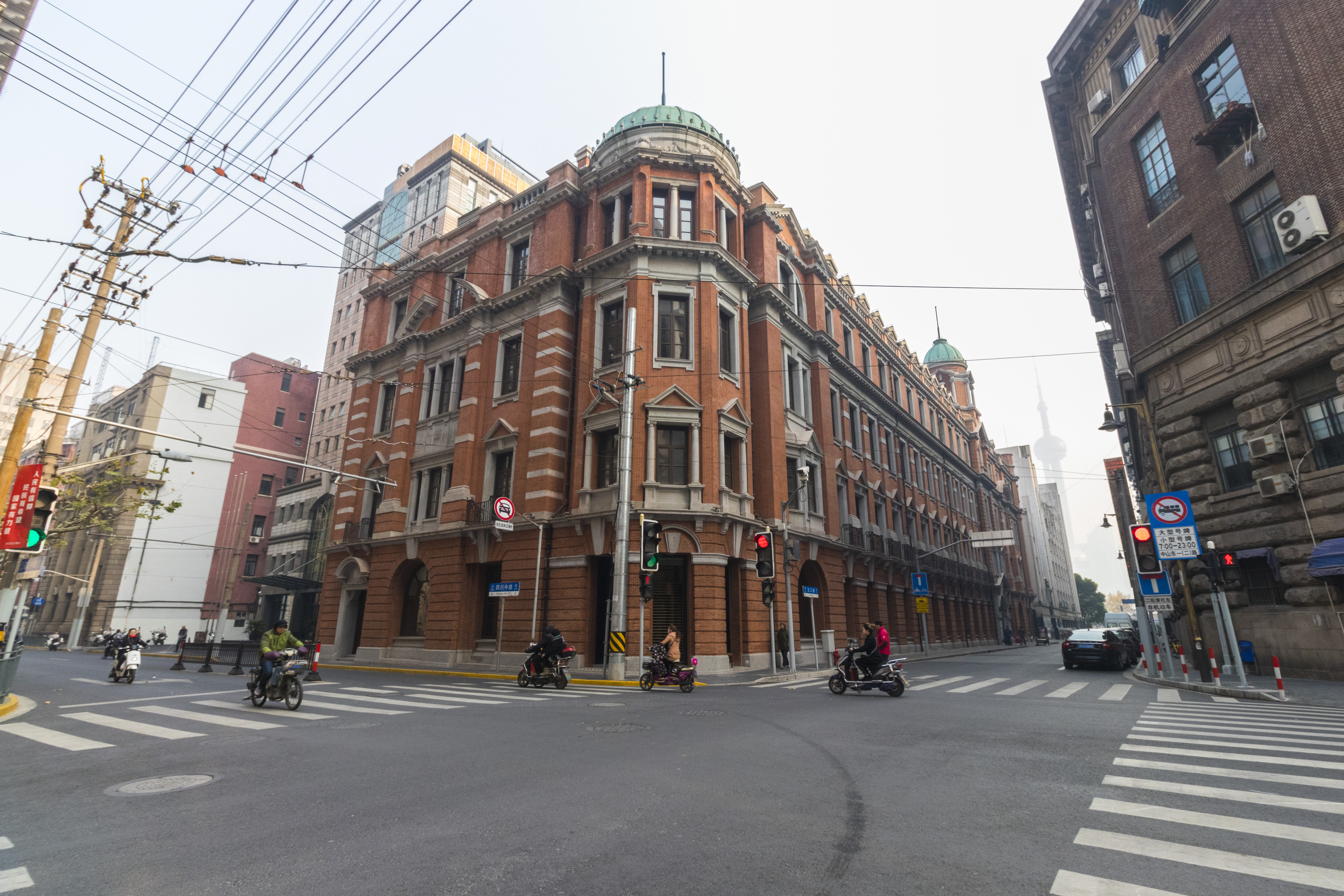
Former office of the Da-Qing Bank in Shanghai, photographed in 2017 after renovation

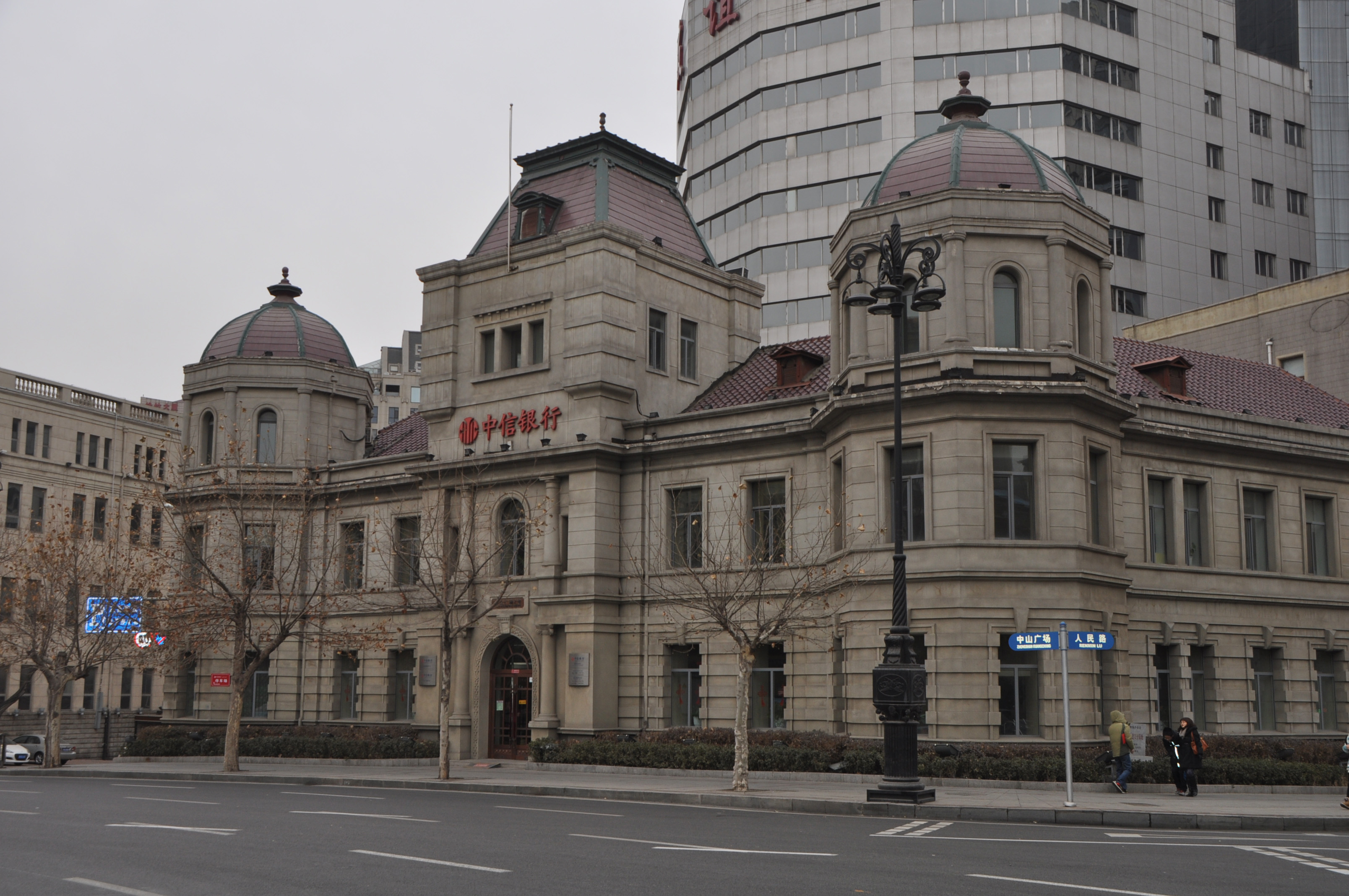
Former branch in Dalian

Debates about the establishment of a national bank became increasingly vivid in the late Qing period, with Peng Shu advocating for a bank that would keep sufficient reserves in "touchable" money (現金) at all times. The large number of private notes that were being produced all over the empire was to be restricted by introducing a stamp duty (印花稅). Reformer Liang Qichao campaigned for the government of the Qing dynasty to emulate the Western world and Japan by moving from the silver standard to the gold standard, unify the currencies of China, and issue government-backed banknotes with a one-third metallic reserve. In 1904, the Ministry of Revenue officially authorised the creation of a central bank, with the primary intent to help finance government deficits by issuing paper money.

The Da-Qing Bank opened its first office in the capital city of Beijing on 27 September 1905 (Guangxu 31). The new bank had a dual nature of being both a central bank and a commercial bank.

The production of banknotes was entrusted to the Beiyang Newspaper (北洋報局) in Northern China. In 1906 the government of the Qing dynasty sent students to Japan to be educated about modern printing techniques, with the aim to have the Shanghai Commercial Press print the cheques of the Ministry's Bank.

The Da-Qing Bank soon opened a branch at 3–5, Hankou Road in Shanghai. Another branch opened in Jinan in 1907.

In 1912 the Da-Qing Government bank was liquidated with its operations transferred to the Bank of China, newly formed by government charter of the Republican government.

== Banknotes ==
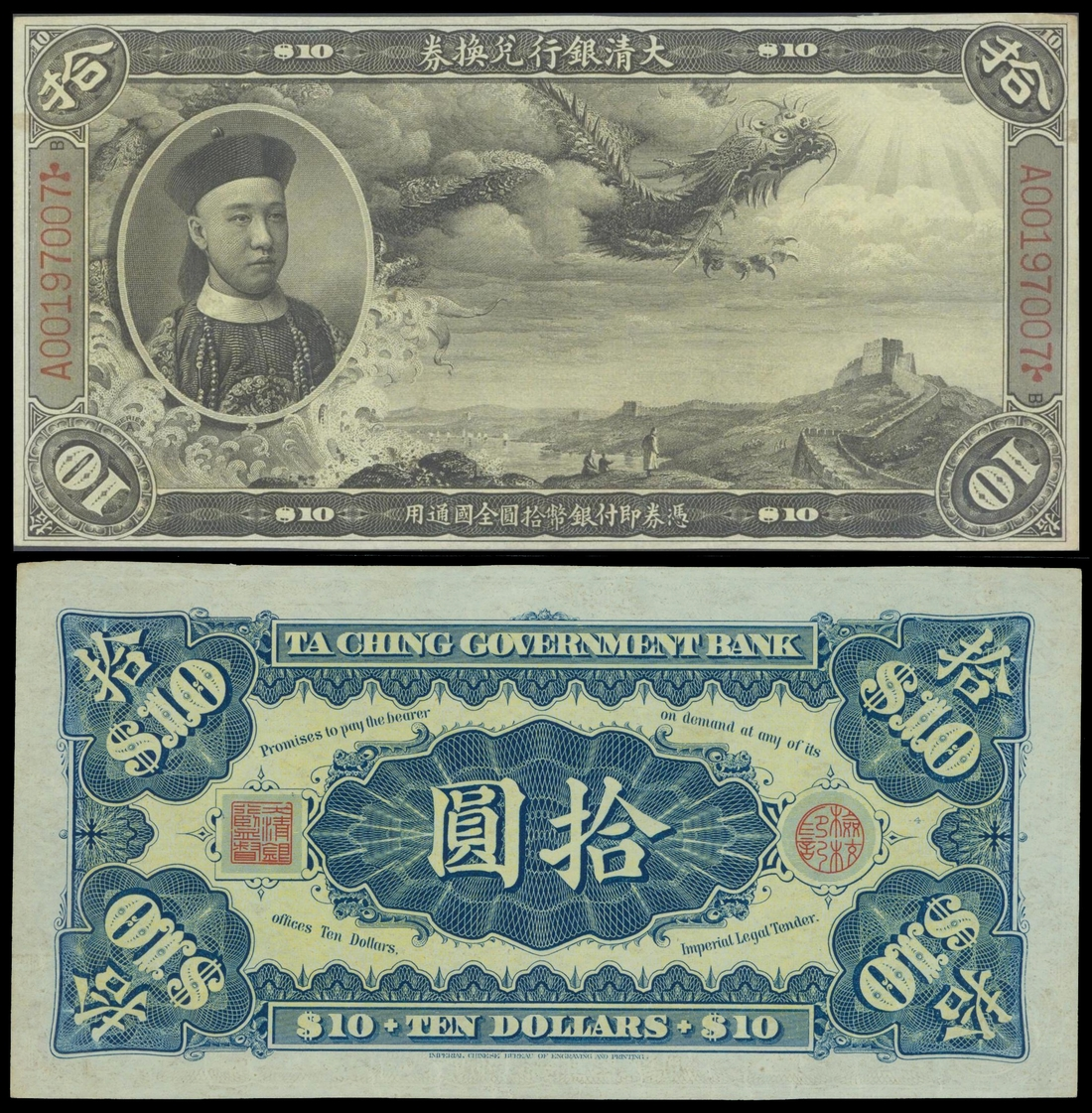
A 10 dollar banknote issued by the Da-Qing Bank depicting Zaifeng, Prince Chun issued in 1910.

The Da-Qing Bank issued two different types of banknotes, one series was denominated in "tael" (兩), these were known as the Yinliang Piao (銀兩票) and had the denominations of 1 tael, 5 taels, 10 taels, 50 taels, and 100 taels. The other series was denominated in "yuan" and were known as Yinyuan Piao (銀元票) and were issued in the denominations of 1 yuan, 5 yuan, 10 yuan, 50 yuan, and 100 yuan. In the year 1907 the Bank of the Ministry of Revenue was renamed to the Da-Qing Bank (大清銀行), accordingly the inscription on all banknotes had to be changed to reflect this. Because there is no advanced engraving technology for banknotes in China at the time and the banknotes that were printed by the Beiyang Newspaper's commercial press were both expensive to make and easy to imitate, the government of the Qing dynasty had later commissioned the American Bank Note Company to print new banknotes for the Da-Qing Bank.

Following the Chinese tradition of issuing new money in a new reign, the Xuantong administration had the design of the official Da-Qing Bank paper notes somewhat changed to herald in the new emperor. The new design was inspired by the designs of the banknotes of the United States dollar of this era; some banknotes showed the portrait of Li Hongzhang, and others depicted that of the emperor's father, Zaifeng, Prince Chun, who was the sitting regent of the infant monarch. At the eve of the Xinhai Revolution in 1911, there were 5,400,000 tael worth of Yinliang banknotes circulating in China, and 12,400,000 yuan in Yinyuan banknotes.

== See also ==
- State Bank of the Russian Empire
- Imperial Bank of China
- Paper money of the Qing dynasty
- History of banking in China
- List of central banks
