= Robert Munroe =

American military officer (1712-1775)

- Born: 1712; Lexington, Massachusetts, Great Britain
- Died: 19 April 1775 (aged 62–63) Lexington, Massachusetts, Great Britain
- Allegiance: United Colonies
- Service years: 1775
- Conflicts: American Revolutionary War Battles of Lexington and Concord †

Robert Munroe (1712 – April 19, 1775) was a soldier from Cambridge Farm, later Lexington, Massachusetts, notable as the third-highest ranking militia officer in the action at Lexington in the Battles of Lexington and Concord, one of the first eight Patriot fatalities in that conflict, and the first officer killed. At the time of his death, he was a militia ensign, now primarily a naval rank in English-speaking countries, but formerly the lowest rank of infantry officer in both the British and United States armies.
