= Banknotes of the Da Qing Bank =

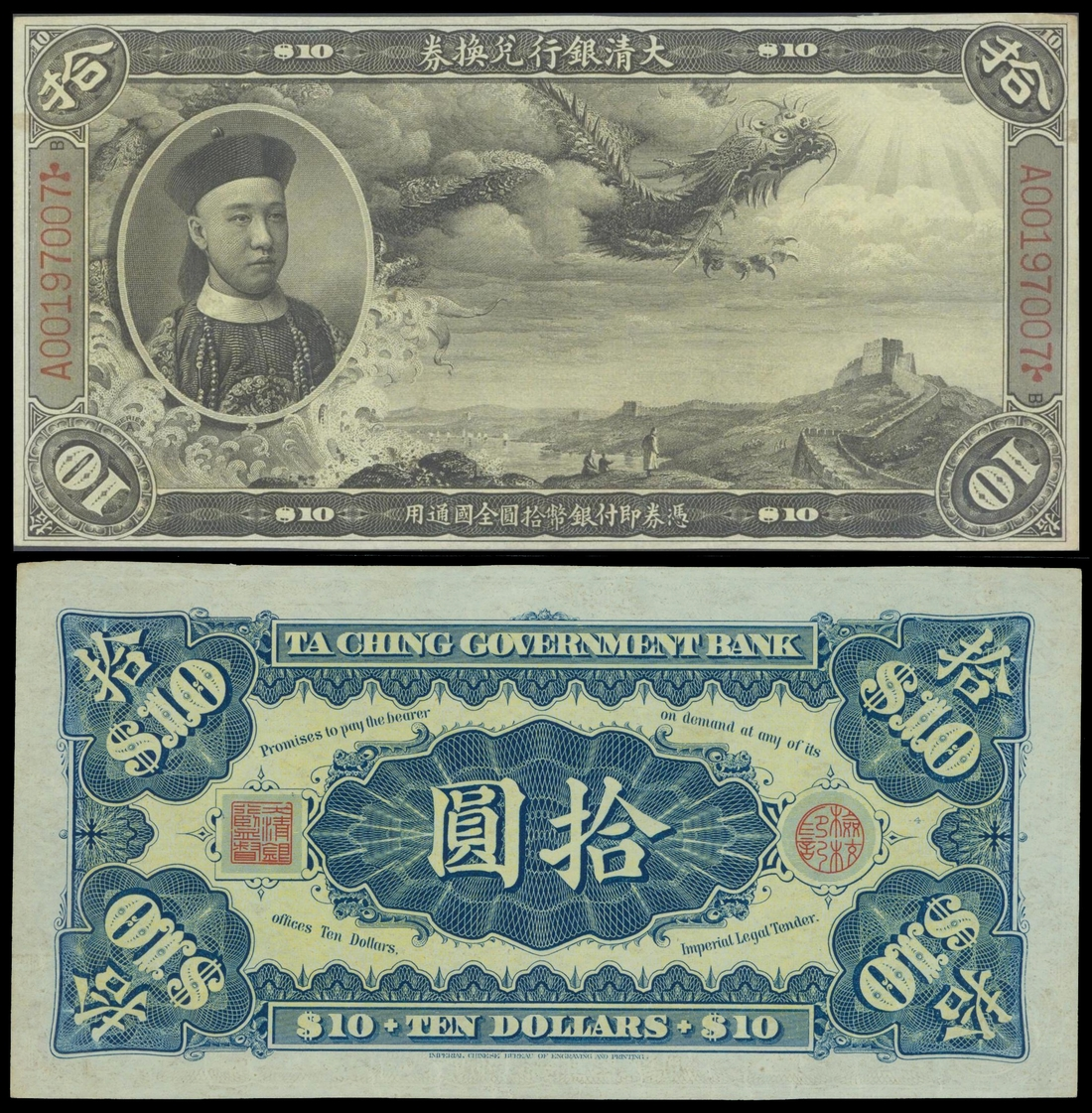
A 10 dollar banknote issued by the Da-Qing Bank depicting Zaifeng, Prince Chun issued in 1910.

The banknotes of the Da-Qing Bank were intended to become the main form of paper money of the Qing dynasty following the bank's establishment in 1905. The Da-Qing Bank had branches throughout China and many of its branches outside of its headquarters in Beijing also issued banknotes.

These banknotes were stipulated to become the only legal tender paper money in China in 1910, but due to the fall of the Qing dynasty in 1911 the Chinese currency system reverted to its original chaotic state during the early Republican era and the Da-Qing Bank would be reorganized as the Bank of China in 1912, which would continue to produce banknotes in Mainland China until 1942 and its Hong Kong branch is still one of the official note-issuing banks for the banknotes of the Hong Kong dollar today.

== History ==
The Da-Qing Bank was the first official financial institution in the history of China to fulfill the functions of a central bank.

=== Background and banknotes of the Da-Qing Bank ===
During the transition from Ming to Qing the Manchu government issued banknotes to finance its expensive military campaigns, but following their conquest of China they abolished these banknotes. Under the reign of the Xianfeng Emperor the Great Qing Treasure Note (大清寶鈔) copper-alloy cash coins-based banknotes and Hubu Guanpiao (戶部官票) silver tael-based banknotes were introduced in response to the Taiping Rebellion, but these banknotes would suffer severe inflation due to mismanagement and were eventually abolished causing the Chinese populace to distrust government-issued paper money once again, though private banknotes would continue to be trusted and to circulate.

Following the opening up of many treaty port cities of China after its defeat during the First Opium War during the 1840s, a large number of major foreign banks entered China and started issuing their own banknotes there for local circulation. During this same era provincial governments started setting up their own official banks to enhance their financial resources. The boom of financial institutions during this era meant that various forms of paper money, private banknotes, foreign banknotes, and many different kinds of local coinages circulated concurrently creating a very chaotic Chinese currency system. During the later part of the Qing dynasty era there was a discussion on whether or not the imperial Chinese government would have to establish a national bank which it finally did in 1905. Peng Shu (彭述) stated before the introduction of new banknotes that the national bank would have to keep sufficient reserves in "touchable" money (現金) at all times. The large number of private notes that were being produced all over the empire was to be restricted by introducing a stamp duty (印花稅). The reformer Liang Qichao campaigned for the government of the Qing dynasty to emulate the Western world and Japan by embracing the gold standard, unify refractory the currencies of China, and issue government-backed banknotes with a one-third metallic reserve. In order to unify the national currency system, in 1905, the government of the Qing dynasty established the "Great Qing Bank of the Ministry of Revenue" (大清戶部銀行) in Beijing, becoming the earliest officially opened national bank in China. The newly established national bank had a dual nature of being both a central bank and a commercial bank. The production of the banknotes was entrusted to the prints of the Beiyang Newspaper (北洋報局) in Northern China. In 1906 the government of the Qing dynasty sent students to Japan to be educated about modern printing techniques, with the aim to have the Shanghai Commercial Press (上海商務印書館) print the cheques of the Ministry's Bank.

The Da-Qing Bank issued two different types of banknotes, one series was denominated in "tael" (兩), these were known as the Yinliang Piao (銀兩票) and had the denominations of 1 tael, 5 taels, 10 taels, 50 taels, and 100 taels. The other series was denominated in "yuan" and were known as Yinyuan Piao (銀元票) and were issued in the denominations of 1 yuan, 5 yuan, 10 yuan, 50 yuan, and 100 yuan.

=== Banknotes of the Da-Qing Bank ===
In 1908, the Great Qing Bank of the Ministry of Revenue changed its name to the Da-Qing Bank (大清銀行) and the inscriptions of the banknotes issued by it had to be changed to reflect its new name. The banknotes issued before the name change were all printed by the Beiyang Newspaper. Because there is no advanced engraving technology for banknotes in China at the time and the banknotes that were printed by the Beiyang Newspaper's commercial press were both expensive to make and easy to imitate, the government of the Qing dynasty had later commissioned the American Bank Note Company to print new banknotes for the Da-Qing Bank.

The banknotes produced by the Da-Qing Bank printed by the American Bank Note Company featured an image of Li Hongzhang on their obverse sides and were subsequently known as "Li Hongzhang notes" (李鴻章像券) to the Chinese public. However, due to the turbulent situation that arose after the death of the Guangxu Emperor and the miscommunications the "Li Hongzhang notes" were printed in various forms and the circulation was chaotic.

During this period, several employees of the Da-Qing Bank were sent to Japan to study modern printing technology and after these people returned to China, they would propose to the imperial court to adopt the Japanese method of copper engraving and some trial banknotes were made, but the proposition was ultimately not adopted by the government of the Qing dynasty.

Following the Chinese tradition of issuing new money in a new reign, the Xuantong administration had the design of the official Da-Qing Bank paper notes somewhat changed to herald in the new emperor. The new design was inspired by the designs of the banknotes of the United States dollar of this era.

In the year 1910, the government of the Qing dynasty issued a new law to solve the chaotic currency situation of China at the time, this law made the banknotes issued by the Da-Qing Bank the only legal tender paper money in China. The law further stipulated that only the Da-Qing Bank can issue paper money and that its banknotes can be used for all payment activities and financial transactions across the country. The government of the Qing dynasty hired the American sculptor L. J. Hatch and several American technicians to train the banknote printing staff and they were set out to design a new version of Da-Qing Bank banknotes. The obverse of these newly designed banknotes featured the face of Zaifeng, Prince Chun and were popularly known as "Da-Qing Dragon banknotes" (大清龍鈔) because they incorporated a Chinese dragon in their designs. The Da-Qing Bank had commissioned eighth trial banknotes based on these designs, they were in the denominations of 1 yuan, 5 yuan, 10 yuan, and 100 yuan. Ultimately, the trial notes all featured a black obverse side and their reverse sides in different colours with the 1 yuan being green, the 5 yuan being purple, the 10 yuan being blue, and the 100 yuan being yellow, they were all printed by a branch of the Da-Qing Bank. Printing of the "Da-Qing Dragon banknotes" began on 1 March 1911. China also became one of the few countries in the world to adopt the technique of steel engraving. These banknotes did not see circulation as in 1911 the Xinhai Revolution broke out which overthrew the Qing dynasty and only a handful of trial banknotes were ever printed.

At the eve of the Xinhai Revolution, there were 5,400,000 tael worth of Yinliang banknotes circulating in China, and 12,400,000 yuan in Yinyuan banknotes.

=== Aftermath ===
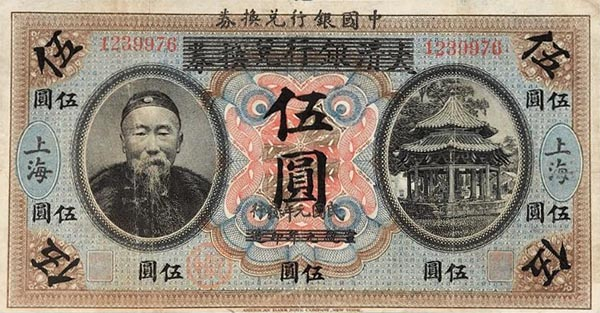
An overprinted 1909 "Li Hongzhang note" (李鴻章像券) of 5 yuan re-issued in 1912 as a "Bank of China note" (中國銀行兌換券).

In the year 1912, the Republic of China was established, and the Da-Qing Bank was reorganized into the Bank of China. In order to alleviate the financial crisis, a large number of "Li Hongzhang notes" were overstamped and changed to "Bank of China notes" (中國銀行兌換券) for circulation.

The Bank of China would continue producing Chinese banknotes until 1942. After the Chinese Civil War ended in 1949, the Bank of China effectively split into two operations. Part of the bank relocated to Taiwan with the Kuomintang (KMT) government, and was privatised in 1971 to become the International Commercial Bank of China (中國國際商業銀行). In 2002, it merged with Chiao Tung Bank (交通銀行) to become the Mega International Commercial Bank. The Mainland operation is the current entity known as the Bank of China. The Hong Kong branch of the Bank of China still issues its own banknotes in Hong Kong today.

== List of banknotes ==
=== 1906 ===
Banknotes of the Da-Qing Bank of the Ministry of Revenue (1906 issue)
Image		Value	Main Color	Description		Date of issue
Obverse	Reverse	Value	Main Color	Obverse	Reverse	Date of issue
		1 dollar				1906
		5 dollars				1906
		10 dollars				1906
		50 dollars				1906

=== 1907 ===
Banknotes of the Da-Qing Bank of the Ministry of Revenue (1907 issue)
Image		Value	Main Color	Description		Date of issue
Obverse	Reverse	Value	Main Color	Obverse	Reverse	Date of issue
		1 dollar				1907
		5 dollars				1907
		10 dollars				1907

=== 1908 ===
Banknotes of the Da-Qing Bank (1908 issue)
Image		Value	Main Color	Description		Date of issue
Obverse	Reverse	Value	Main Color	Obverse	Reverse	Date of issue
		10 dollars				1908

=== 1909 ===
Banknotes of the Da-Qing Bank (1909 issue)
Image		Value	Main Color	Description		Date of issue
Obverse	Reverse	Value	Main Color	Obverse	Reverse	Date of issue
		1 dollar				1909
		5 dollars				1909
		10 dollars				1909
		100 dollars				1909

=== 1910 ===
Banknotes of the Da-Qing Bank (1910 issue)
Image		Value	Main Color	Description		Date of issue
Obverse	Reverse	Value	Main Color	Obverse	Reverse	Date of issue
		1 dollar				1910
		5 dollars				1910
		10 dollars				1910
		100 dollars				1910

=== 1911 ===
Banknotes of the Da-Qing Bank (1911 issue)
Image		Value	Main Color	Description		Date of issue
Obverse	Reverse	Value	Main Color	Obverse	Reverse	Date of issue
		1 tael				1911
		2 taels				1911
