= United Colonies =

Name used for the Thirteen Colonies

United Colonies of North-America
- Continental Union Flag

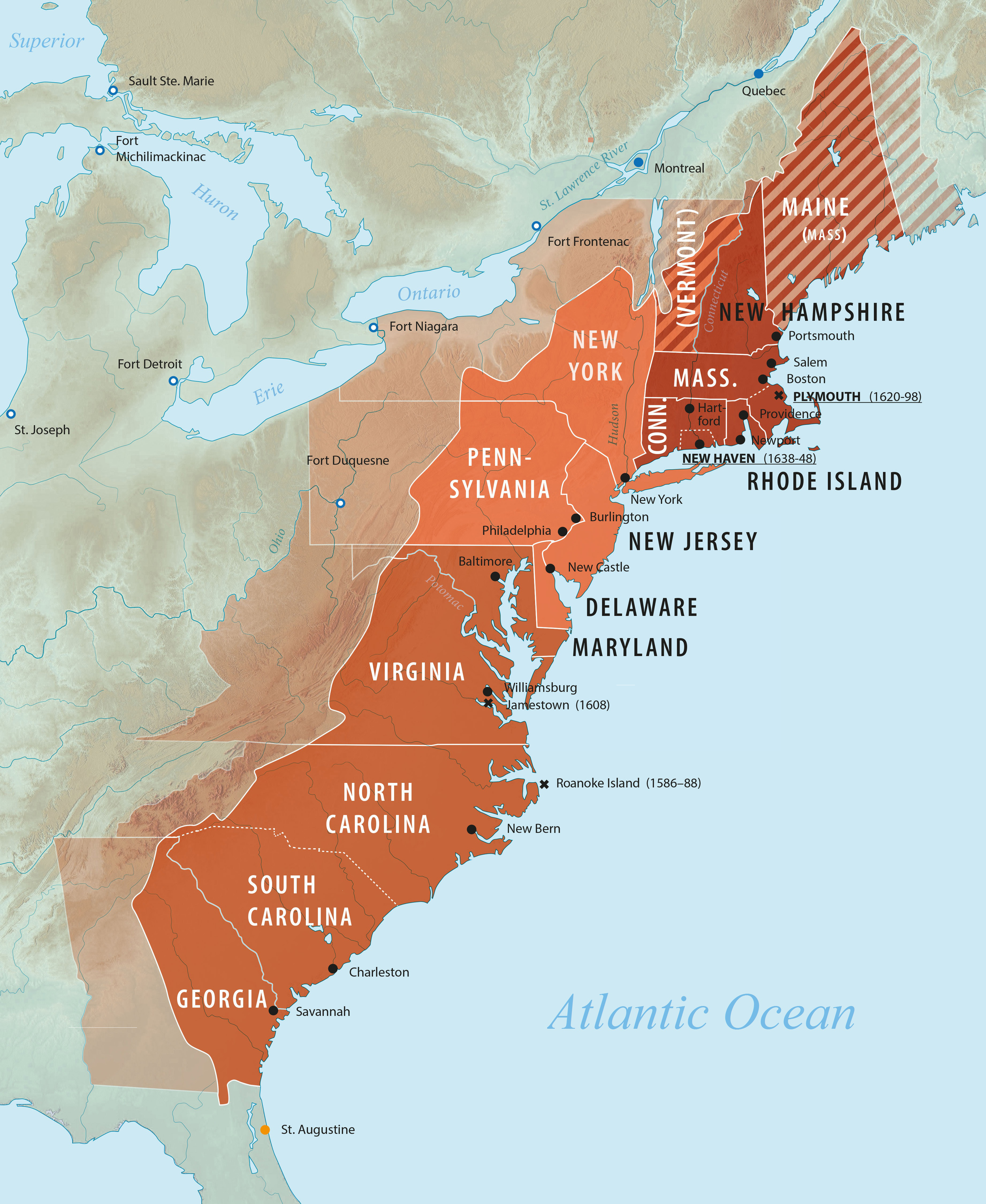
- Thirteen Colonies of North America: Dark red = New England colonies. Deep orange = Middle Atlantic colonies. Red-brown = Southern colonies.
- Status: Unrecognized state
- Capital: Philadelphia (de facto)
- Common languages: English
- Government: Revolutionary confederation
- President of the Continental Congress
  - 1775: Peyton Randolph (first)
  - 1775–1776: John Hancock (last)
- Legislature: Continental Congress
- Historical era: American Revolutionary War
  - Second Continental Congress: May 10, 1775
  - Lee Resolution: July 2, 1776
  - Independence declared: July 4, 1776

Population
  - 1775: 2,400,000
- Currency: Continental currency
Preceded by	Succeeded by
Thirteen Colonies	United States

The United Colonies, officially the United Colonies of North-America, was created in 1775 by the Second Continental Congress in Philadelphia as a newly formed proto-state comprising the Thirteen Colonies. In 1776, before and during America's declared independence, Continental currency banknotes displayed the name 'The United Colonies' from May 1775 until February 1777. The name was being used to refer to the colonies as a whole before the Second Continental Congress met.

== Etymology ==
The precise place or date of its origin is unknown. John Adams used the phrase "united colonies" as early as February 27, 1775, in a letter entitled "To the Inhabitants of the Colony of Massachusetts-Bay" published in the Boston Gazette:

They have declared our cause their own—that they never will submit to a precedent in any part of the united colonies, by which Parliament may take away Wharves and other lawful estates, or demolish Charters; for if they do, they have a moral certainty that in the course of a few years, every right of Americans will be taken away, and governors and councils, holding at the will of a Minister, will be the only legislatives, in the colonies.

On June 19, 1775, the members of the Second Continental Congress called themselves the "delegates of the United Colonies" and appointed George Washington the "General and Commander in chief of the Army of the United Colonies".

On June 7, 1776, Richard Henry Lee, after receiving instructions and wording from the Fifth Virginia Convention, proposed to Congress that they cut their political ties with Great Britain, declare themselves independent, and create a constitution. Known as the Lee Resolution, and passed by the delegates on July 2, 1776, it referred to the United Colonies, reading in part:

Resolved, that these United Colonies are, and of right ought to be, free and independent States, that they are absolved from all allegiance to the British Crown, and that all political connection between them and the State of Great Britain is, and ought to be, totally dissolved.

Two days later, on July 4, 1776, the 56 delegates to the Second Continental Congress, unanimously adopted the Declaration of Independence, which was overseen by the Committee of Five and written principally by Thomas Jefferson in Philadelphia over a period of two weeks in June 1776.

On September 9, 1776, the Second Continental Congress formally dropped the name "United Colonies of North-America" in favor of the "United States of America" as in the July Declaration of Independence.

== Colonial mobilization ==
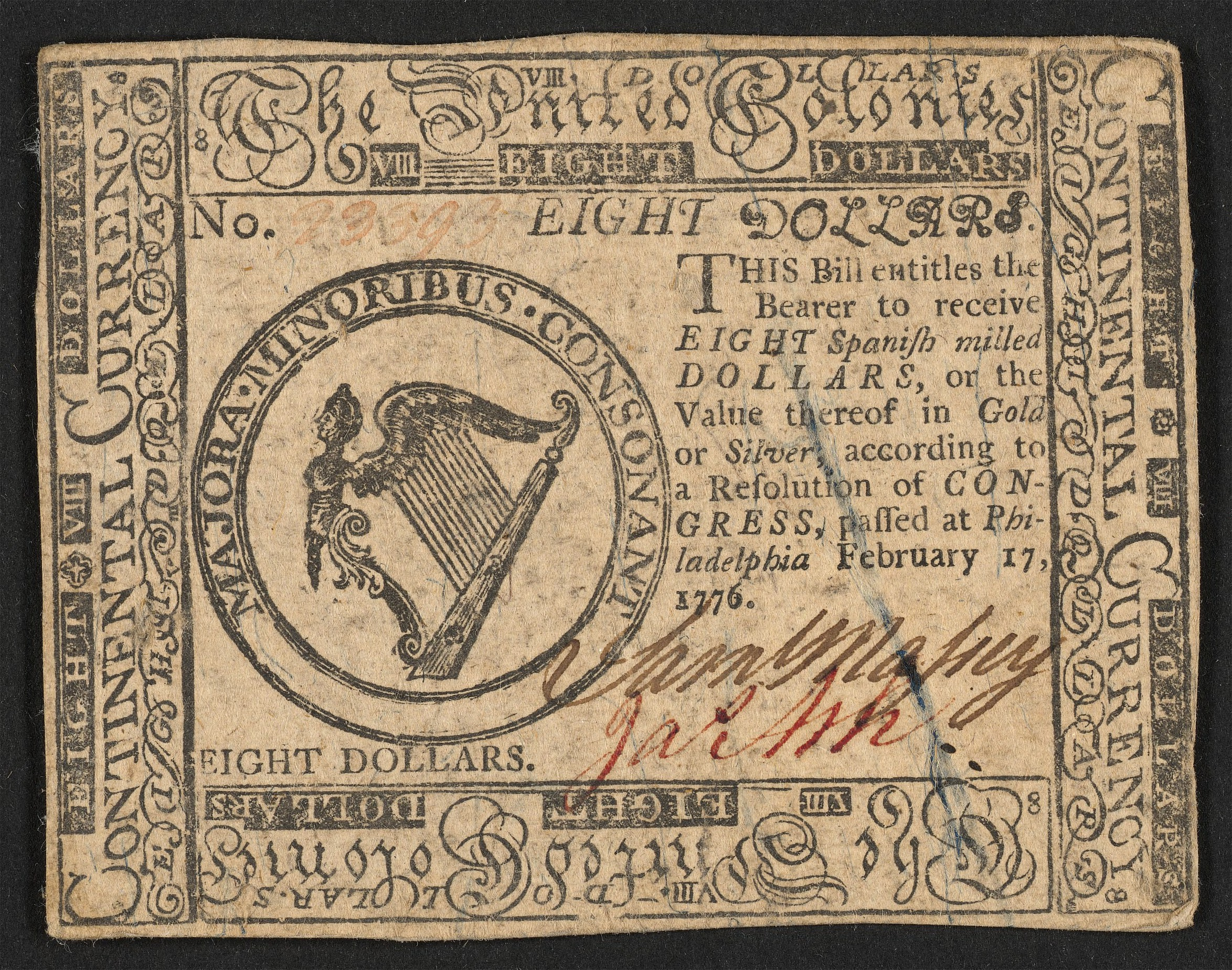
1776 eight-dollar Continental Currency banknote featuring "The United Colonies" name

Congress called on the colonies to restyle themselves as states, with new constitutions. On March 14, 1776, as proposed by John Adams to the Congress:

Resolved That it be recommended to the several Assemblies, Conventions and Committees or Councils of Safety, of the United Colonies, immediately to cause all Persons to be disarmed, within their respective Colonies, who are notoriously disaffected to the cause of America, or who have not associated, and shall refuse to associate to defend by Arms these united Colonies, against the hostile Attempts of the British Fleets and Armies.…"

After the Battles of Lexington and Concord in April 1775, New England American patriot militias mobilized to surround the British Army in Boston. On July 6, 1775, the Second Continental Congress in Philadelphia issued A declaration by the representatives of the United Colonies of North America, now met in General Congress in Philadelphia, setting forth the causes and necessity of their taking up arms. They concluded, "We mean not to dissolve that union which as so long and so happily subsisted between us, in which we sincerely wish to see restored....We have not raised armies with ambitious designs of separating from Great Britain, and establishing independent states."

On May 10, 1775, the Second Continental Congress unanimously resolved:

That it be recommended to the respective Assemblies and Conventions of the United Colonies, where no government sufficient to the exigencies of their affairs hath hitherto been established, to adopt such government, as shall, in the opinion of the representatives of the people, best conduce to the happiness and safety of their constituents, in particular, and America in general.

In preparation for independence, Congress defined treason as levying war against the United Colonies, adhering to the King, or providing aid or comfort to the enemy.

In early 1776, the cause of independence was widely promulgated in Thomas Paine's pamphlet Common Sense. He called on the 13 colonies to write a new constitution:

let their business be to frame a CONTINENTAL CHARTER, or Charter of the United Colonies; (answering to what is called the Magna Carta of England) fixing the number and manner of choosing members of Congress, members of Assembly, with their date of sitting, and drawing the line of business and jurisdiction between them: (Always remembering, that our strength is continental, not provincial.) Securing freedom and property to all men, and above all things the free exercise of religion, according to the dictates of conscience; with such other matter as is necessary for a charter to contain.

Congress voted Independence in the Lee Resolution on July 2, 1776, and two days later, on July 4, unanimously adopted the "Declaration of Independence", written principally by Thomas Jefferson, which read in part:

in the name and by the authority of the good people of these colonies, solemnly publish and declare that these United Colonies are, and of right ought to be, free and independent states; that they are absolved from all allegiance to the British crown, and that all political connection between them and the state of Great Britain is, and ought to be, totally dissolved.

== New agencies ==
Congress appointed George Washington "General & Commander in chief of the army of the United Colonies and of all the forces raised or to be raised by them" on June 19, 1775, and on June 22 instructed him to take charge of the siege of Boston. Congress created a series of new agencies in the name of the United Colonies, including a Navy.

On September 14, 1775, Washington, as "Commander in Chief of the Army of the United Colonies of North America", instructed Colonel Benedict Arnold to invade Quebec, seize military stores, and attempt to convince French Canadians to join the American Revolution.

On September 9, 1776, the Second Continental Congress formally dropped the name "United Colonies" in favor of the “United States of America." Congress ordered, “That in all continental commissions, and other instruments, where, heretofore, the words ‘United Colonies’ have been used, the stile be altered for the future to the 'United States.'”

== See also ==
- Colonial history of the United States
- History of the United States (1776–1789)
- Founding Fathers of the United States
- Perpetual Union
