= Continental currency banknotes =

List of United States banknotes issued 1775–1779

This is a list of Continental currency banknotes, which were printed from 1775 through 1779.

== 1775 ==
Denomination	Obverse	Reverse	Date
$1			November 29, 1775
$2			November 29, 1775
$3			May 10, 1775
$4			May 10, 1775
$5			May 10, 1775
$5			November 29, 1775
$6			November 29, 1775
$7			May 10, 1775
$7			November 29, 1775
$8			May 10, 1775
$8			November 29, 1775
$20			May 10, 1775

== 1776 ==
Denomination	Obverse	Reverse	Date
$1/6			February 17, 1776
$1/3			February 17, 1776
$1/2			February 17, 1776
$2/3			February 17, 1776
$1			February 17, 1776
$2			February 17, 1776
$2			May 9, 1776
$2			November 2, 1776
$3			May 9, 1776
$3			July 22, 1776
$3			November 2, 1776
$4			November 2, 1776
$5			February 17, 1776
$5			July 22, 1776
$5			November 2, 1776
$6			May 9, 1776
$6			November 2, 1776
$7			February 17, 1776
$7			May 9, 1776
$7			July 22, 1776
$8			May 9, 1776
$8			November 2, 1776
$30			July 22, 1776
$30			November 2, 1776

== 1777 ==
Denomination	Obverse	Reverse	Date
$2			May 20, 1777
$3			February 26, 1777
$3			May 20, 1777
$4			February 26, 1777
$6			May 20, 1777
$7			February 26, 1777
$8			May 20, 1777

== 1778 ==
Denomination	Obverse	Reverse	Date
$5			September 26, 1778
$6			April 11, 1778
$7			September 26, 1778
$8			April 11, 1778
$8			September 26, 1778
$20			September 26, 1778
$30			September 26, 1778
$40			September 26, 1778
$50			September 26, 1778
$60			September 26, 1778

== 1779 ==
Denomination	Obverse	Reverse	Date
$1			January 14, 1779
$2			January 14, 1779
$4			January 14, 1779
$5			January 14, 1779
$20			January 14, 1779
$30			January 14, 1779
$35			January 14, 1779
$40			January 14, 1779
$45			January 14, 1779
$55			January 14, 1779
$60			January 14, 1779
$65			January 14, 1779
$70			January 14, 1779
$80			January 14, 1779

== See also ==
- Banknotes of the United States dollar
- Continental Currency dollar coin
- Fugio cent
