= Banknotes of the United States dollar =

From 1775 to 1779, the Continental Congress issued Continental currency banknotes. Then there was a period when the United States just used gold and silver, rather than paper currency. In 1812, the US began issuing Treasury Notes, although the motivation behind their issuance was funding federal expenditures rather than the provision of a circulating medium. In 1861, the US began issuing Demand Notes, which were the first paper money issued by the United States whose main purpose was to circulate. And since 1914, the US has issued Federal Reserve Notes.

Since 1971, Federal Reserve Notes have been the only banknotes of the United States dollar that have been issued. But at some points in the past, the United States had multiple different types of banknotes, such as United States Notes (1862–1971), interest bearing notes (1863-1865), and gold certificates (1865–1934).

== Federal Reserve Notes ==
Federal Reserve Notes were first issued in 1914, and are liabilities of the Federal Reserve System. They were redeemable in gold until 1933. After that date they ceased to be redeemable in anything, much like United States Notes (which later led to the halting of the production of United States Notes). They switched to small size in 1929 and are the only type of currency in circulation today in the United States. They were originally printed in denominations of $5, $10, $20, $50, $100, $500, $1,000, $5,000 and $10,000. The $500, $1,000, $5,000 and $10,000 denominations were last printed in 1945 and discontinued in 1969, making the $100 bill the largest denomination banknote in circulation. A $1 note was added in 1963 to replace the $1 silver certificate after that type of currency had been discontinued. Since United States Notes were discontinued in 1971, Federal Reserve Notes are the only type of currency circulating in the US. In 1976, a $2 note was added, 10 years after the $2 denomination of United States Note was officially discontinued. The denomination proved to be unpopular and is now treated as a curiosity, although it is still being printed. Starting in 1996, all notes except $1 and $2 were redesigned to have a larger portrait of the people depicted on them. Since 2004, all notes (except $1 and $2) were progressively changed to have different colors to make them more easily distinguishable from each other, until the last such note was introduced in 2013 (the $100).

Current circulating banknotes of the United States
Images		Value	Background color	Fluorescent strip color	Description			Date of	
Obverse	Reverse	Value	Background color	Fluorescent strip color	Obverse	Reverse	Watermark	First series	Issue
		$1	Green	None	George Washington (1st president)	Great Seal of the United States	None	1963	1963
		$2	Green	None	Thomas Jefferson (3rd president)	Declaration of Independence by John Trumbull	None	1976	April 13, 1976
		$5	Purple	Blue	Abraham Lincoln (16th president)	Lincoln Memorial	Two watermarks of the number "5"	2006	March 13, 2008
		$5	Purple	Blue	Obverse of the Great Seal of the United States	Lincoln Memorial	Two watermarks of the number "5"	2006	March 13, 2008
		$10	Orange	Orange	Alexander Hamilton (Founding father; 1st treasury secretary)	Treasury Building	Alexander Hamilton	2004 A	March 2, 2006
		$10	Orange	Orange	The phrase "We the People" from the Constitution; The torch of the Statue of Liberty	Treasury Building	Alexander Hamilton	2004 A	March 2, 2006
		$20	Green	Green	Andrew Jackson (7th president)	White House	Andrew Jackson	2004	October 9, 2003
		$20	Green	Green	Eagle	White House	Andrew Jackson	2004	October 9, 2003
		$50	Pink	Yellow	Ulysses S. Grant (18th president)	United States Capitol	Ulysses S. Grant	2004	September 28, 2004
		$50	Pink	Yellow	Flag of the United States	United States Capitol	Ulysses S. Grant	2004	September 28, 2004
		$100	Teal	Pink	Benjamin Franklin (Founding father)	Independence Hall	Benjamin Franklin	2009A	October 8, 2013
		$100	Teal	Pink	Declaration of Independence	Independence Hall	Benjamin Franklin	2009A	October 8, 2013
These images are to scale at 0.7 pixel per millimetre (18 pixel per inch). For table standards, see the banknote specification table.

== Historical banknotes ==
=== Continental currency (1775–1779) ===
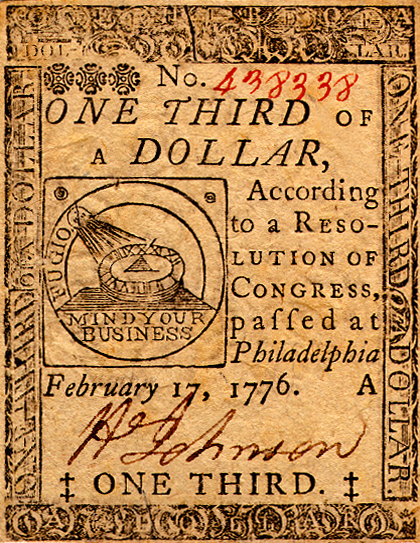
Continental one-third dollar note (obverse)

Before the American Revolution, every one of the Thirteen Colonies had issued its own paper money, most often denominated in British pounds, shillings and pence. In 1776, the newly created United States issued currency which was bought by people who wanted to support the war (it was promised that the currency could be redeemed for Spanish milled dollars once the war would end). At first, the banknotes circulated at par with the stated value, however after a few months they started depreciating until they became almost worthless. The United States agreed to redeem the notes for treasury bonds at 1% of the face value. The issued denominations ranged from $1/6 to $80.

=== Demand Notes (1861–1862) ===
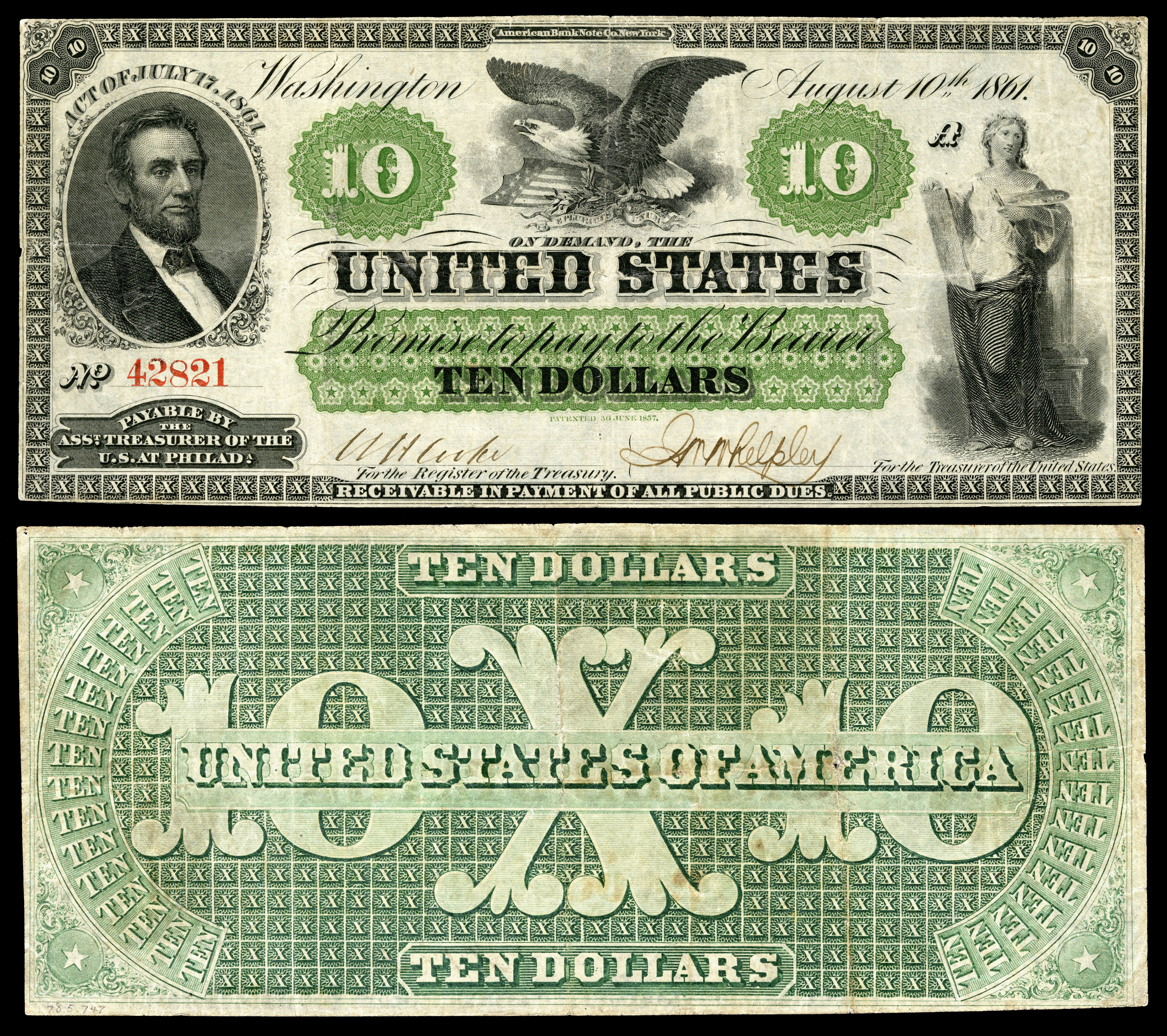
$10 Demand Note

Demand Notes are considered the first paper money issued by the United States whose main purpose was to circulate. They were made because of a coin shortage as people hoarded their coins during the American Civil War and were issued in denominations of $5, $10 and $20. They were redeemable in coin. They were replaced by United States Notes in 1862. After the war ended paper money continued to circulate until present day.

=== United States Notes (1862–1971) ===
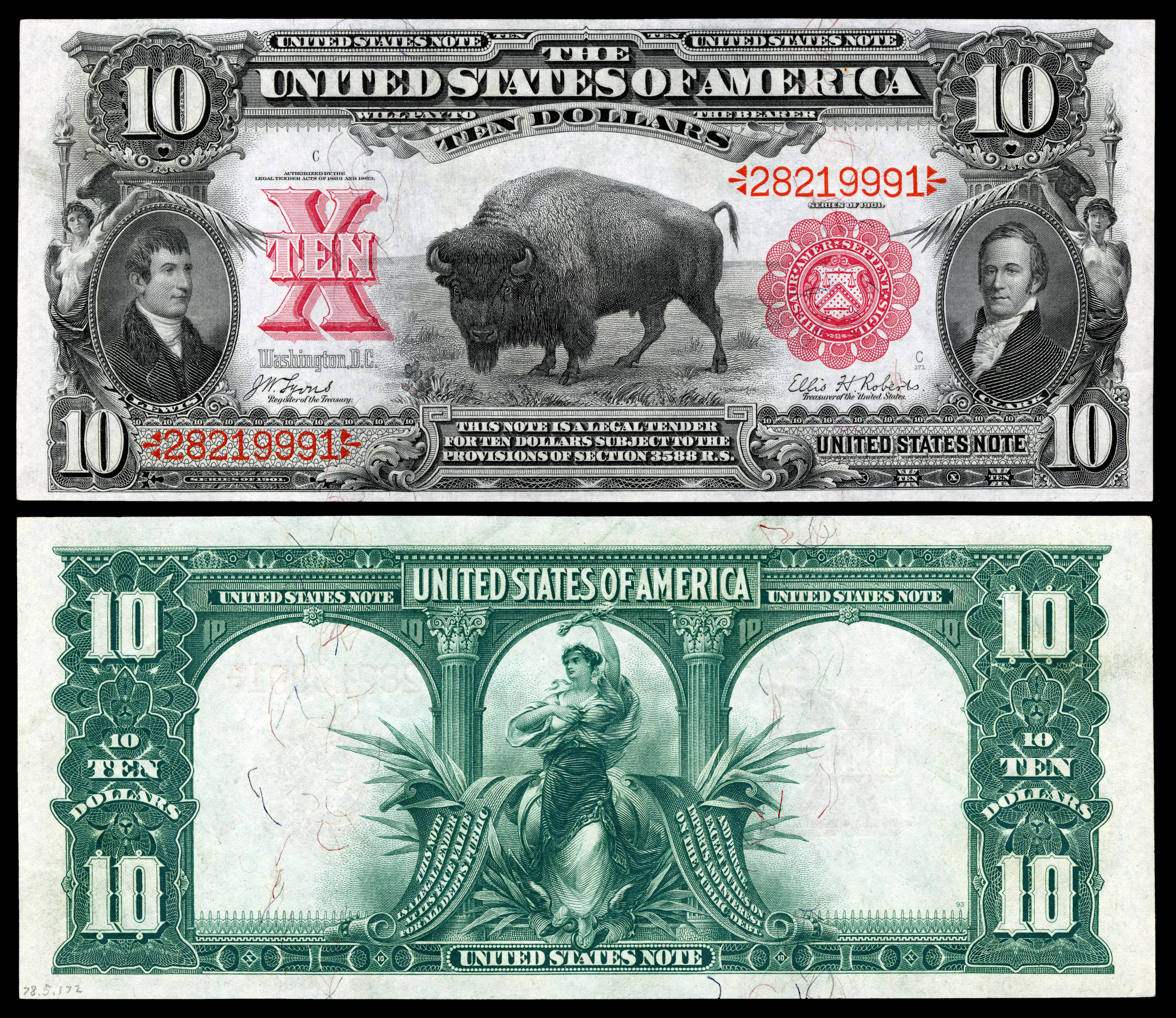
$10 United States large-size note from 1901, nicknamed the "Bison Note"

United States Notes, also known as Legal Tender Notes, succeeded Demand Notes as the main currency form of the United States. They were not redeemable but were receivable for all taxes and debts, which is what persuaded people to circulate them. They had a red seal and were originally issued in denominations of $1, $2, $5, $10, $20, $50, $100, $500 and $1,000. $5,000 and $10,000 notes were issued in 1878 and have not been issued anytime after. United States Notes switched to small size in 1928 and were introduced only in denominations of $1, $2 and $5. In 1934, when Federal Reserve Notes stopped being redeemable in gold, the only difference between them and Legal Tender Notes was that the first were liabilities of the Federal Reserve while the latter were direct liabilities of the United States Treasury Department. The $2 and $5 were issued through 1966, and the $2 note was available only as a United States Note. In 1966 the $5 United States Note was discontinued and the $2 denomination was discontinued altogether. In 1966 a $100 US note was issued to meet legal requirements about the amount of notes in circulation. In 1971 the production of US notes was halted and they were officially discontinued in 1994.

=== Fractional currency (1862–1876) ===
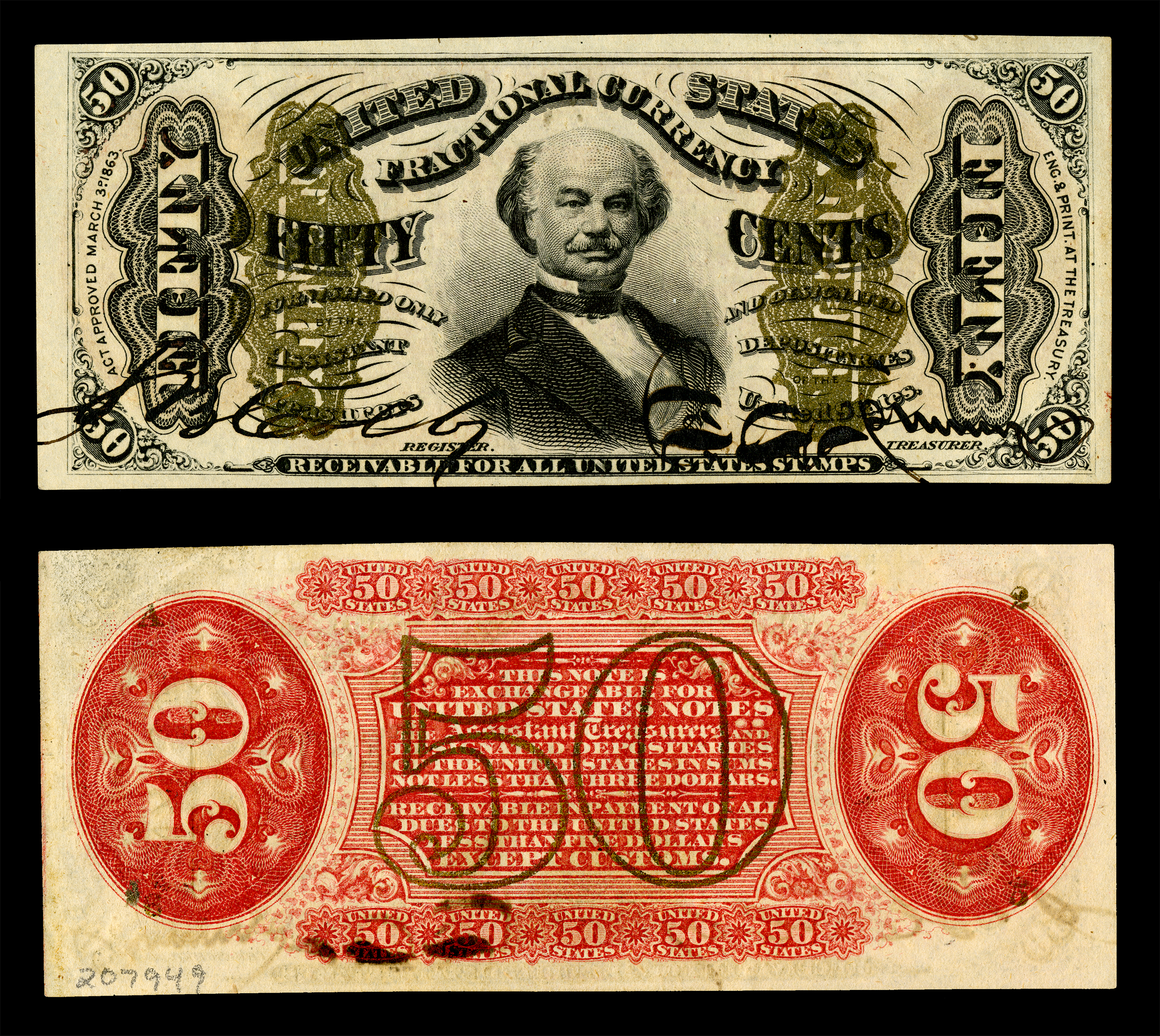
Fifty-cent fractional currency depicting Francis E. Spinner

During the American Civil War silver and gold coins were hoarded by the public because of uncertainty about the outcome of the war. People began to use postage stamps instead, encasing them in metal for better protection. The U.S. government decided to substitute paper currency of denominations under a dollar for coins in order to solve the problem. The denominations issued were 3¢, 5¢, 10¢, 15¢, 25¢ and 50¢. There were five issues of fractional currency.

=== Compound interest treasury notes (1863–1864) ===
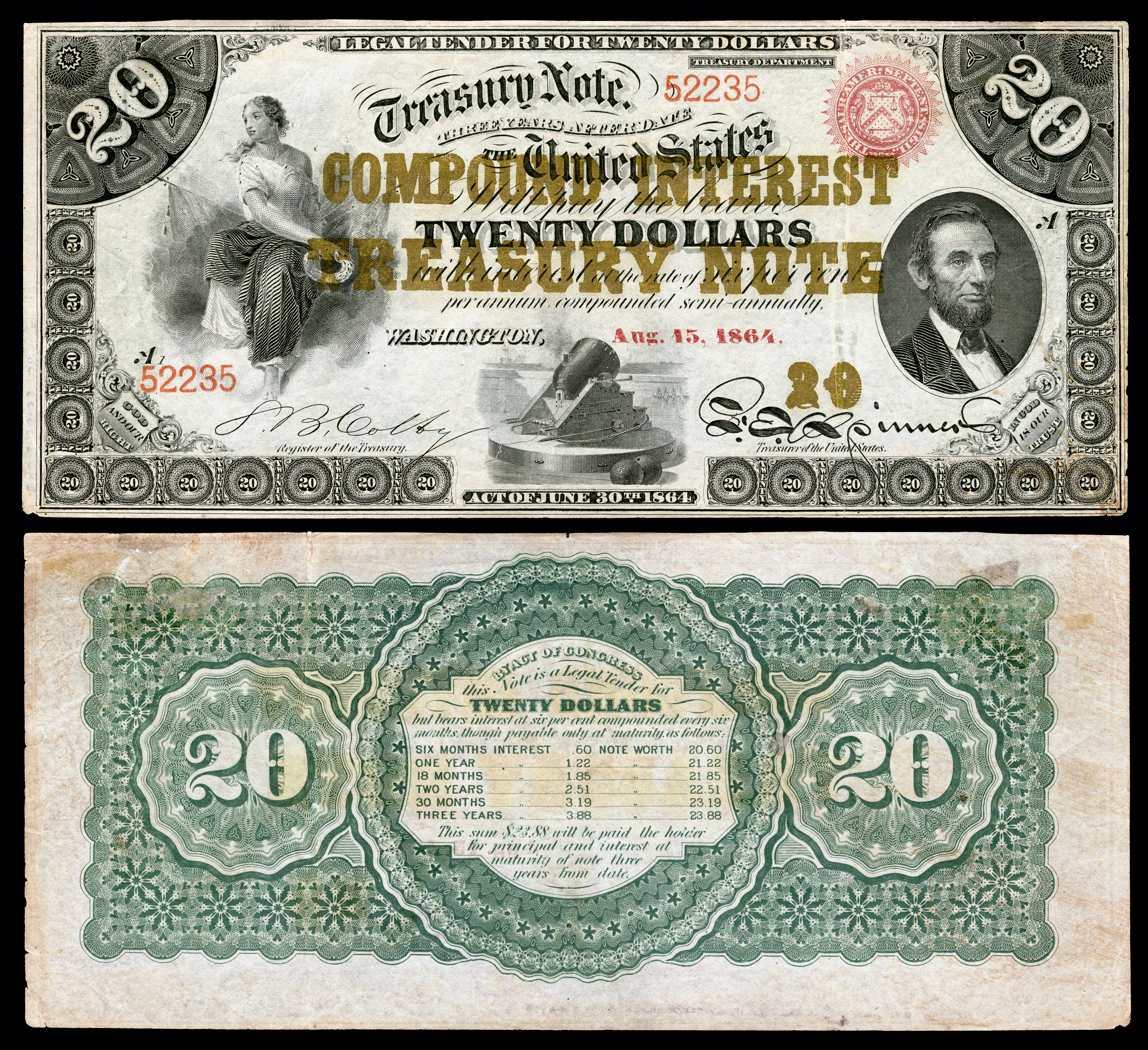
Two-year $20 1864 compound interest treasury note

In 1863 and 1864, compound interest treasury notes were issued. They paid out 6% annual interest compounded semi-annually 3 years after their issue. Their denominations were $10, $20, $50, $100, $500 and $1,000.

=== Gold certificates (1865–1934) ===
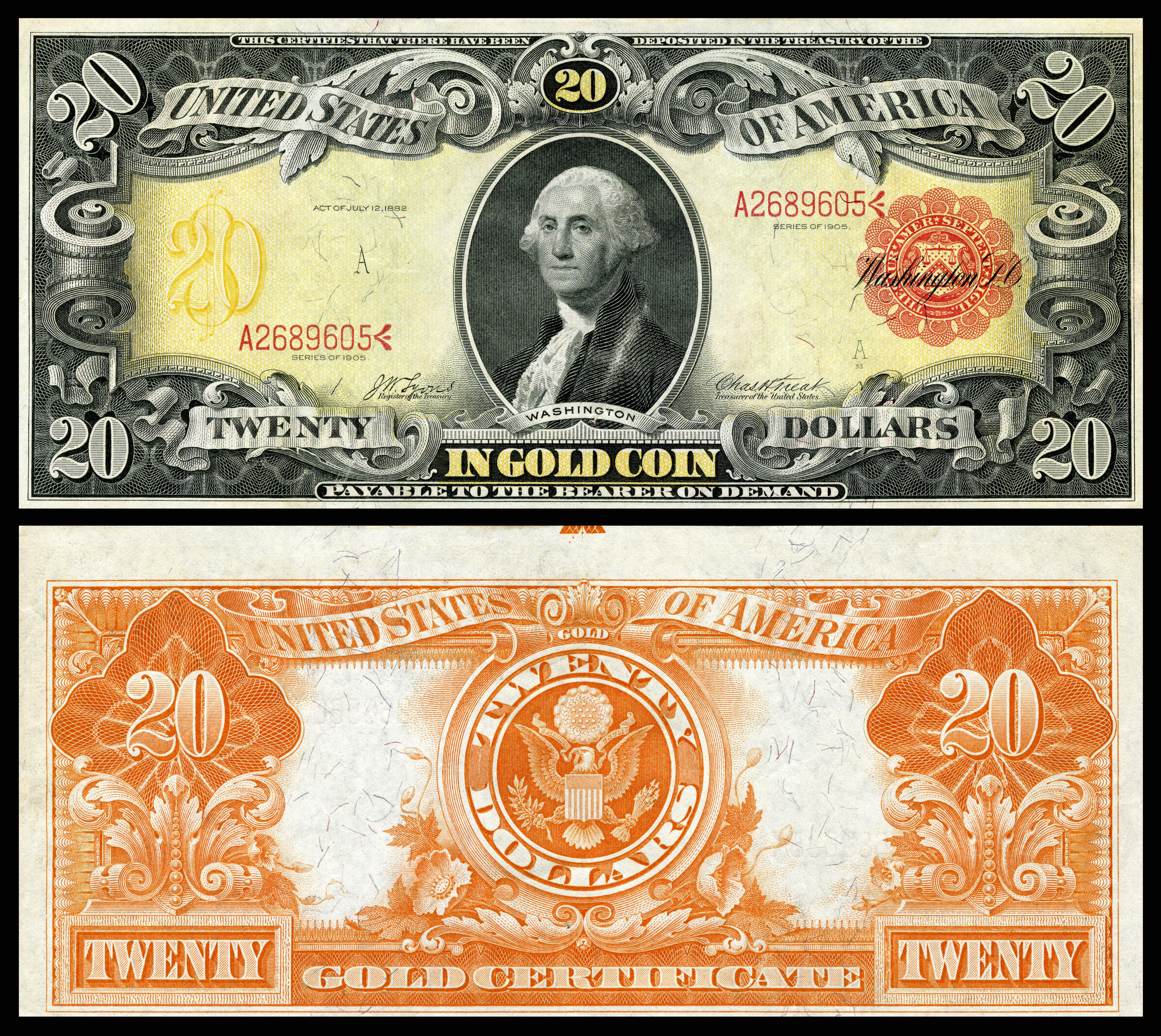
$20 large-size gold certificate, depicting George Washington

Gold certificates were issued from 1865 through 1934 and were redeemable in gold coin. Following the 1933 ban on gold ownership in the United States, they were recalled to be redeemed for United States Notes. They were issued in large size through 1929 and in small size thereafter. They were originally issued in denominations of $20, $100, $500, $1,000, $5,000 and $10,000. A $50 note was added in 1882, followed by a $10 note in 1907. A $100,000 note which was used only for inter-bank transactions was also issued in 1934 but never made available to the general public. It is still illegal to own.

=== National Bank Notes (1869–1933) ===
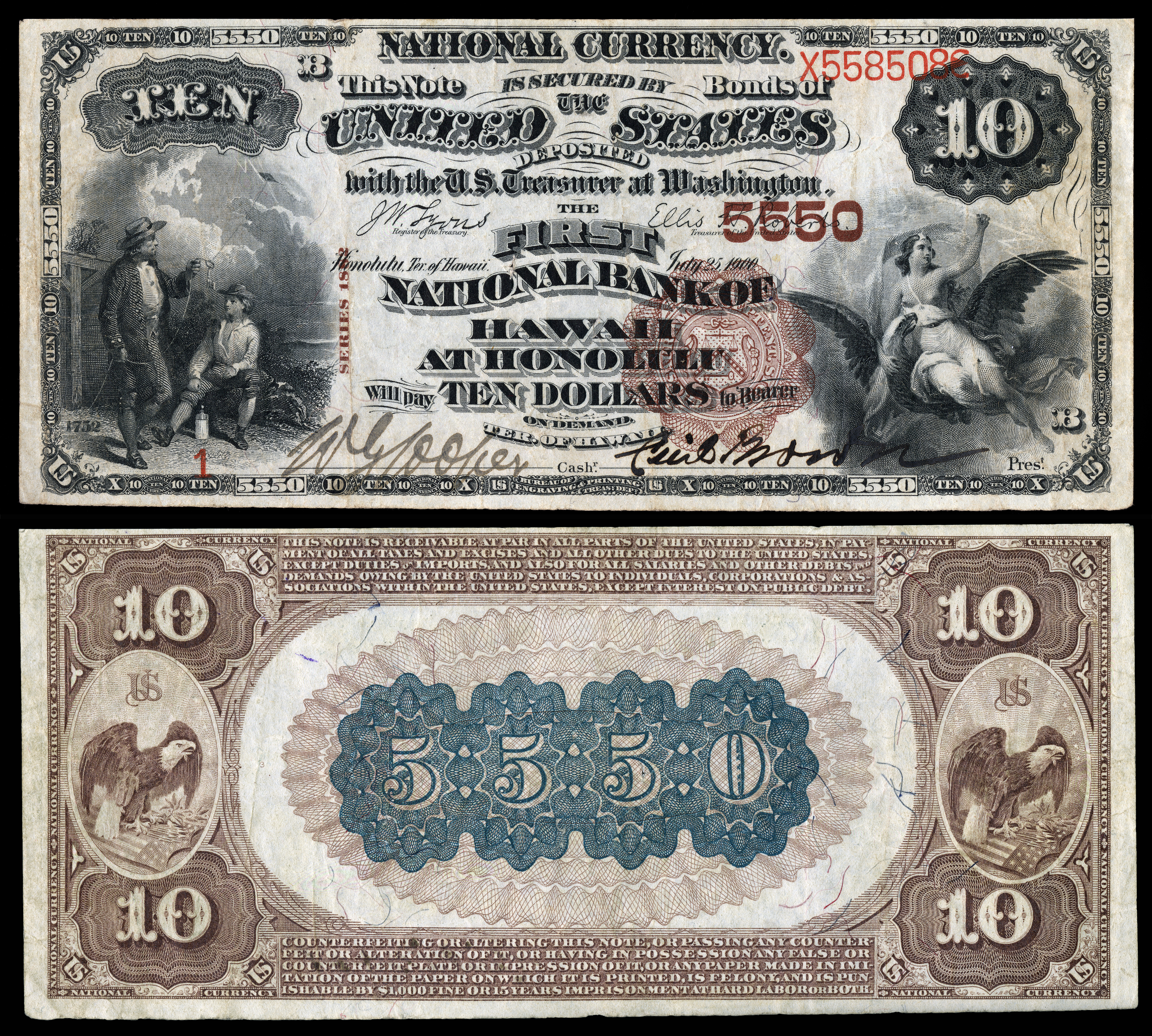
$10 National Bank Note issued by the First National Bank of Hawaii in Honolulu

National Bank Notes were issued by banks chartered or authorized to do so by the Federal Government. The charter expired after 20 years, but could be renewed. They were of uniform appearance except for the name of the bank and were issued as three series or charter periods: 1869–1882, 1882–1902, and 1902–1922. In 1929 the Great Depression motivated an emergency reissue, but they were discontinued in 1933. The denominations issued were $1, $2, $5, $10, $20, $50, $100, $500 and $1,000. The $1, $2, $500 and $1,000 notes were only issued in large size until 1882. The $1 and $2 notes are common from most issuing banks. Only three remaining examples of the $500 note are known, with one held privately; the $1,000 note is unknown to exist.

=== National Gold Bank Notes (1870–1875) ===
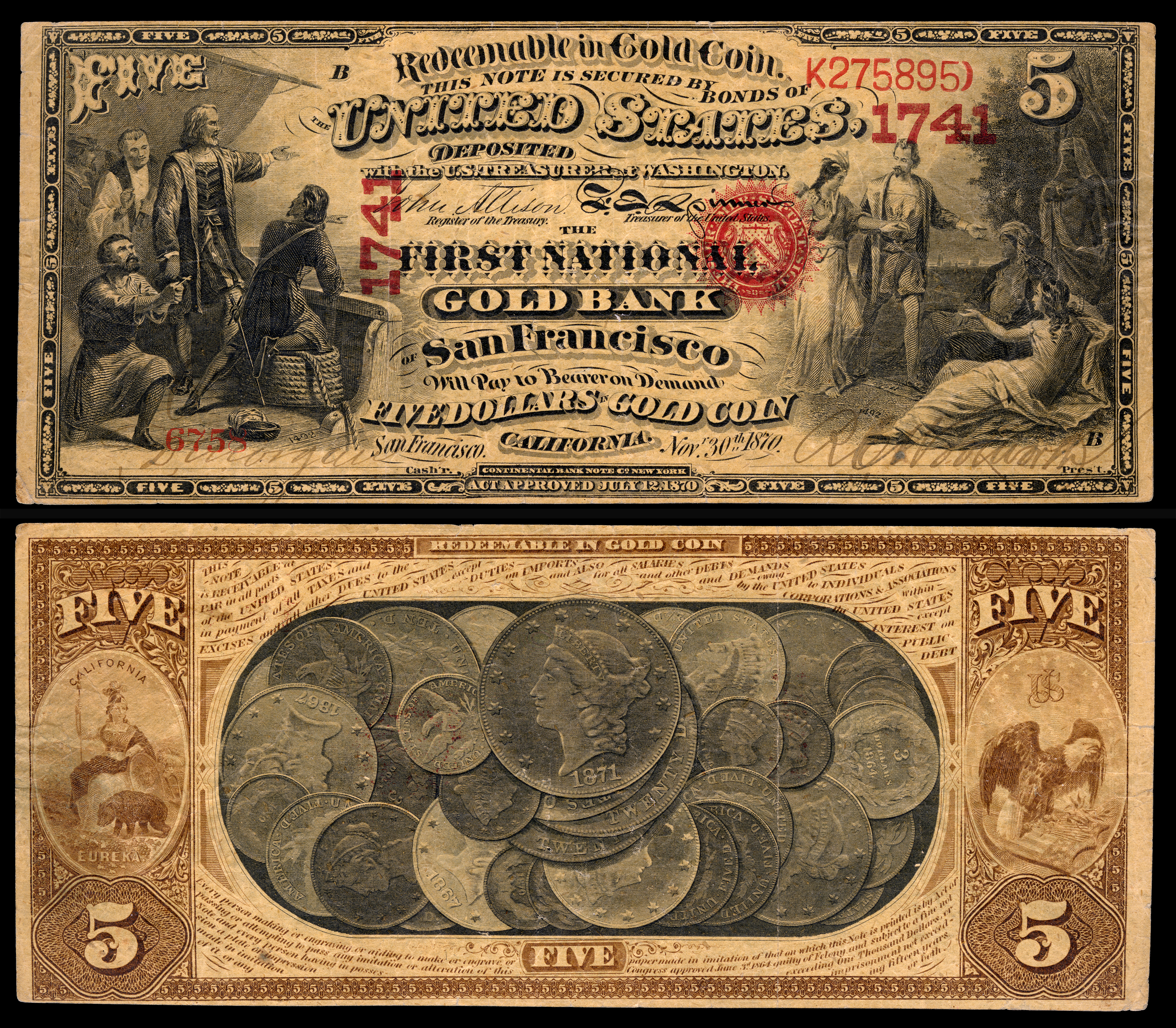
$5 National Gold Bank Note from San Francisco

National Gold Bank Notes were issued by private banks, mostly from California. The concept is similar to that of the National Bank Notes, the difference being that National Gold Bank Notes were redeemable in gold. They were issued from 1870 to 1875 in denominations of $5, $10, $20, $50, $100 and $500. They are all rare with the $5 being by far the most common, with 427 examples known, and the $50 the rarest, with only 7 examples known. The $500 note is not known to exist.

=== Silver certificates (1878–1964) ===
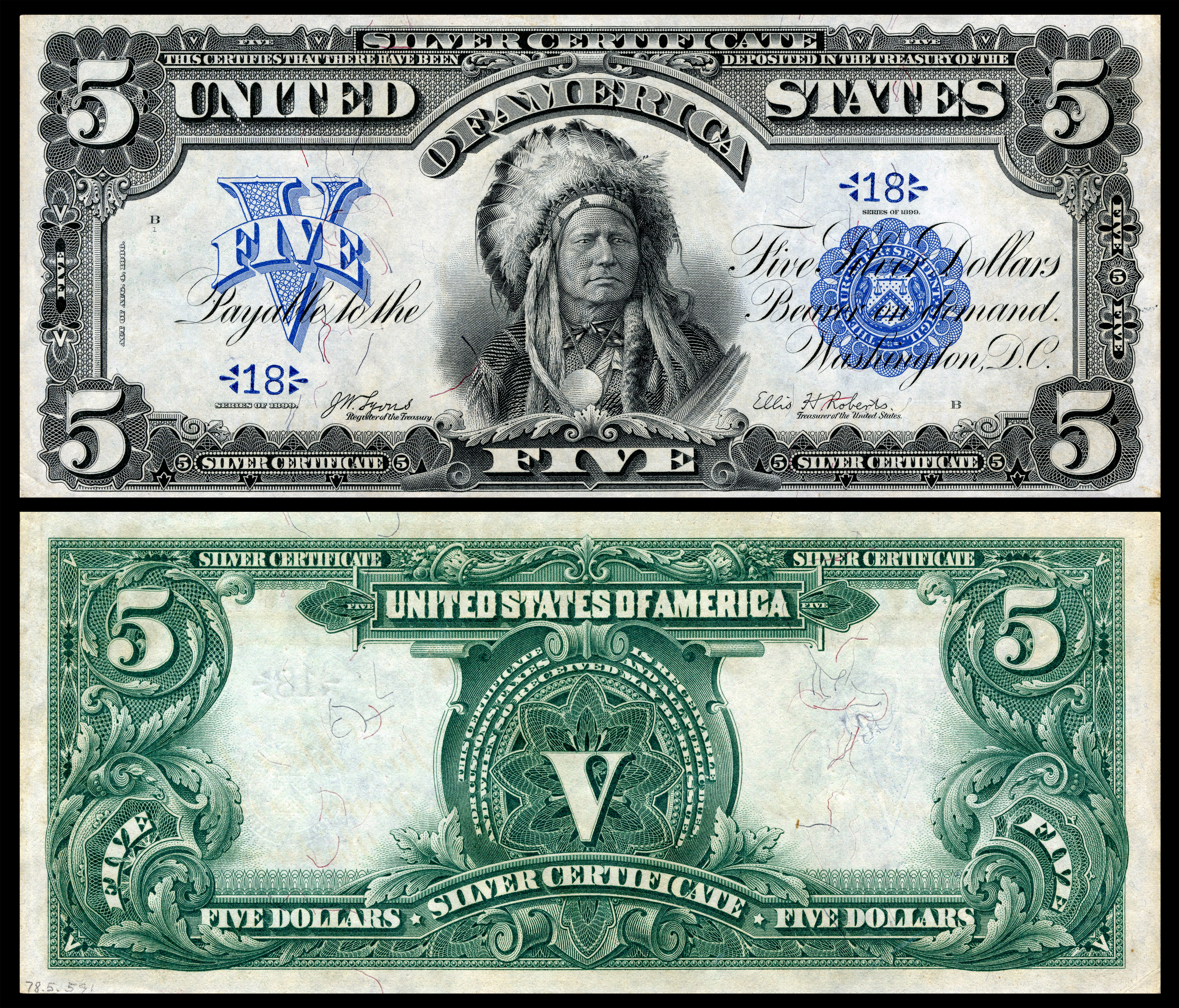
$5 large-size silver certificate, depicting Running Antelope

Silver certificates were issued from 1878 through 1964 and were redeemable in silver coin through 1967 and thereafter in raw silver bullion. Since 1968 they are not redeemable in anything but Federal Reserve Notes. They were removed from circulation in 1964, at the same time as silver coins. They were issued in large size through 1929 and in small size thereafter. They were originally issued in denominations of $10, $20, $50, $100, $500 and $1,000. $1, $2 and $5 notes were added in 1882. Small size notes were only made in denominations of $1, $5 and $10. The small notes were made with a blue seal, except for notes made as an emergency issue for American soldiers in North Africa during World War II, which were made with a yellow seal, as well as a $1 note made for use only in Hawaii during World War II, which had a brown seal.

=== Refunding Certificate (1879) ===
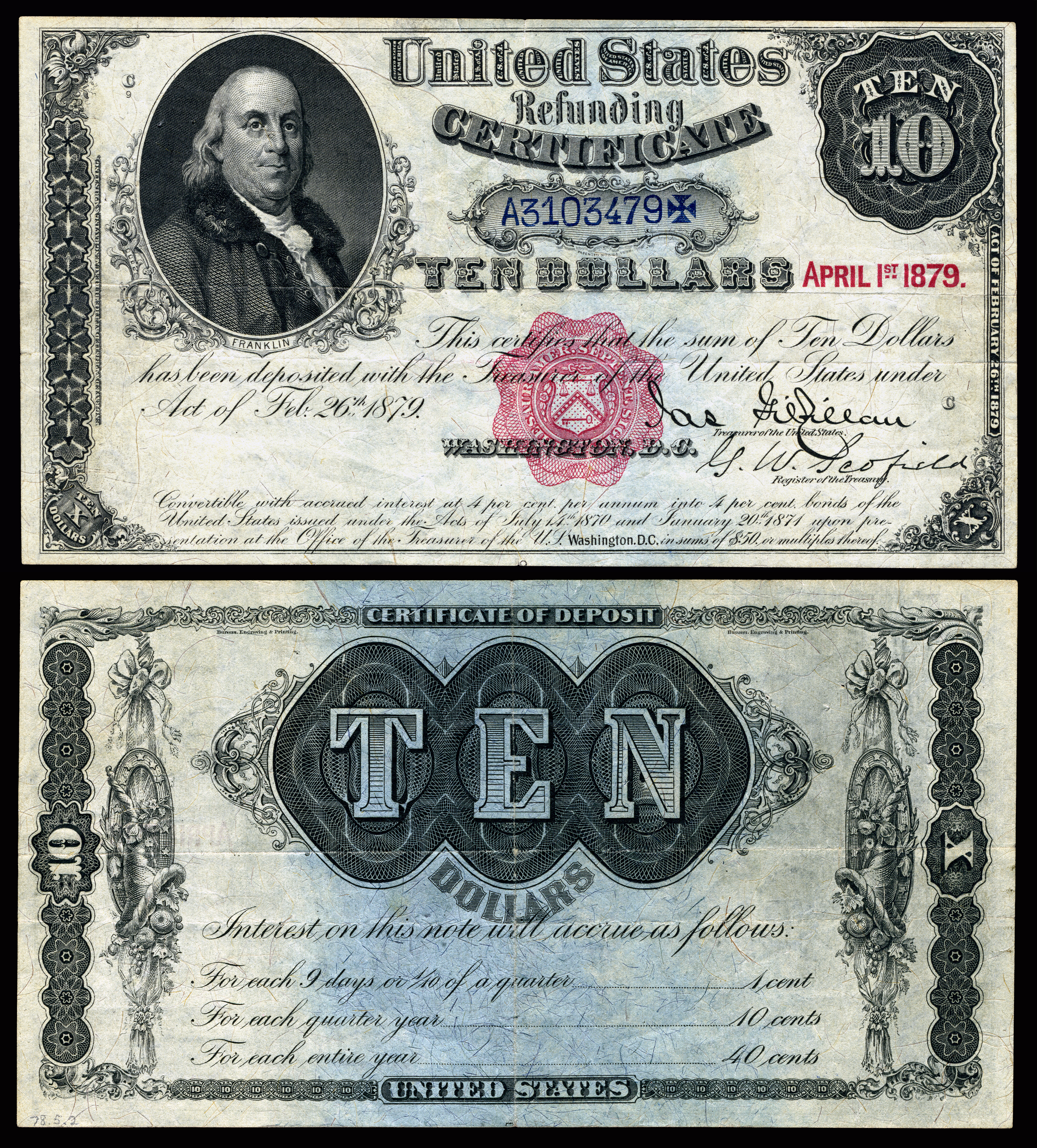
Refunding Certificate

Refunding Certificates, issued only in 1879 and only in the $10 denomination, were special in that their interest (4% per annum) did accrue indefinitely, which was meant as a way to persuade people into buying them. However, as very few of these notes were redeemed, in 1907 Congress passed an act stopping the accrual of interest, fixing the value of the notes at $21.30.

=== Treasury or Coin Notes (1890–1891) ===
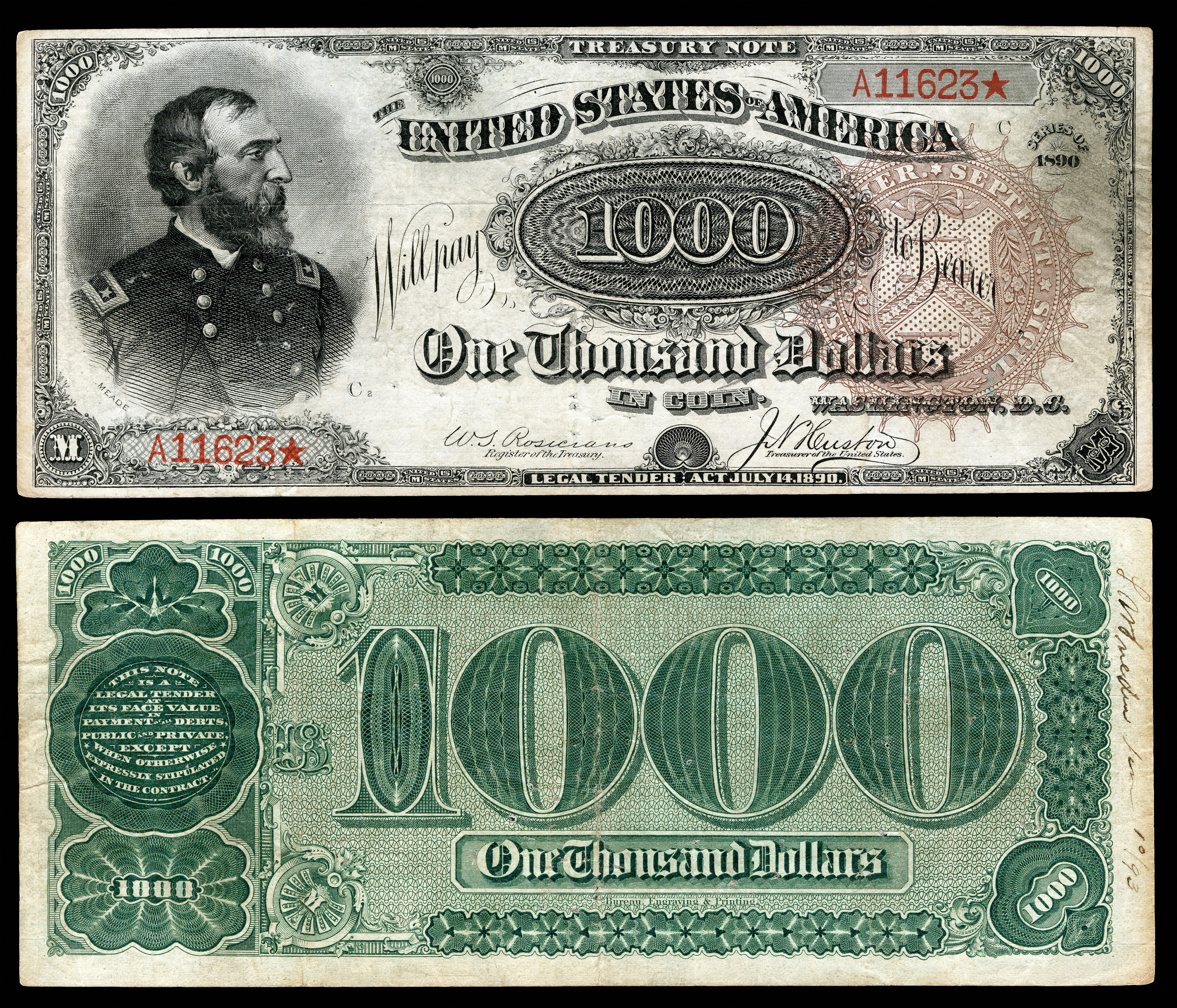
The $1,000 1890 Coin Note, nicknamed the Grand Watermelon

These notes were issued in 1890 and 1891 and were redeemable for coins. It was the decision of the Secretary of the Treasury whether the coins would be silver or gold. They were originally issued in denominations of $1, $2, $5, $10, $20, $100 and $1,000. $50 and $500 notes were introduced in 1891.

=== Federal Reserve Bank Notes (1914–1934) ===
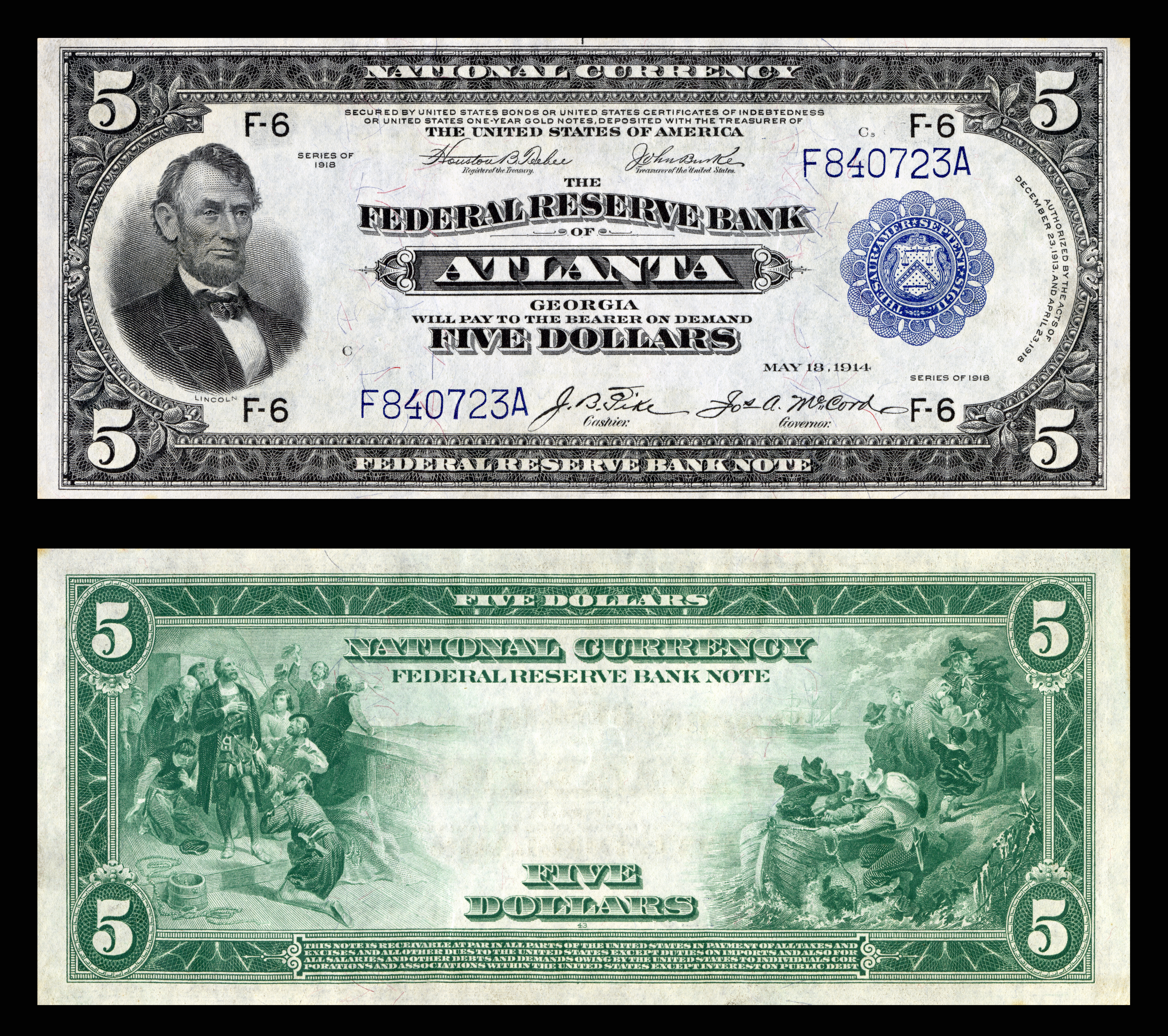
$5 large-size Federal Reserve Bank Note, Series 1918

After the Federal Reserve System was created in 1914, alongside Federal Reserve Notes, which are liabilities of the Federal Reserve System as a whole, Federal Reserve Bank Notes were issued. They were liabilities of only the Federal Reserve Bank which issued them. In 1929, like other kinds of notes they switched to small size. They were discontinued in 1934 and no longer available from banks since 1945.
