= Maryland =

U.S. state

- State
- Flag Seal
- Nicknames: "Old Line State", "Free State", "Little America", "America in Miniature"
- Mottoes: "Fatti maschii, parole femine" (English: "Strong Deeds, Gentle Words") (lit.: Manly deeds, womanly words); The Latin text encircling the seal: Scuto bonæ voluntatis tuæ coronasti nos ("With Favor Wilt Thou Compass Us as with a Shield") Psalm 5:12
- Location of Maryland within the United States
- Country: United States
- Before statehood: Province of Maryland
- Admitted to the Union: April 28, 1788 (7th)
- Capital: Annapolis
- Largest city: Baltimore
- Largest county or equivalent: Montgomery
- Largest metro and urban areas: Washington–Baltimore (combined); Baltimore (metro and urban)

Government
  - Governor: Wes Moore (D)
  - Lieutenant Governor: Aruna Miller (D)
- Legislature: General Assembly
  - Upper house: Senate
  - Lower house: House of Delegates
- Judiciary: Supreme Court of Maryland
- U.S. senators: Chris Van Hollen (D); Angela Alsobrooks (D)
- U.S. House delegation: 7 Democrats; 1 Republican; (list)

Area
  - Total: 12,407 sq mi (32,133 km^{2})
  - Land: 9,774 sq mi (25,314 km^{2})
  - Water: 2,633 sq mi (6,819 km^{2}) 21%
  - Rank: 42nd

Dimensions
  - Length: 200 mi (320 km)
  - Width: 120 mi (200 km)
- Elevation: 350 ft (110 m)
- Highest elevation (Hoye-Crest (Note: Elevation adjusted to North American Vertical Datum of 1988)): 3,360 ft (1,024 m)
- Lowest elevation (Atlantic Ocean): 0 ft (0 m)

Population (2025)
  - Total: ▲6,265,347
  - Rank: 19th
  - Density: 632/sq mi (244/km^{2})
  - Rank: 5th
  - Median household income: $98,700 (2023)
  - Income rank: 3rd
- Demonym: Marylander

Language
  - Official language: None (English, de facto)
- Time zone: UTC−05:00 (Eastern)
  - Summer (DST): UTC−04:00 (EDT)
- USPS abbreviation: MD
- ISO 3166 code: US-MD
- Traditional abbreviation: Md.
- Latitude: 37° 53′ N to 39° 43′ N
- Longitude: 75° 03′ W to 79° 29′ W
- Website: maryland.gov

State symbols of Maryland
List of state symbols
- Flag of Maryland

- Seal of Maryland

- Coat of arms of Maryland
- Song: None. Formerly: "Maryland, My Maryland" by James Ryder Randall (1861), (adopted 1939, repealed 2021)

Living insignia
- Bird: Baltimore oriole
- Cat breed: Calico cat
- Crustacean: Blue crab
- Dog breed: Chesapeake Bay Retriever
- Fish: Rock fish
- Flower: Black-eyed Susan
- Horse breed: Thoroughbred
- Insect: Baltimore checkerspot butterfly
- Reptile: Diamondback terrapin
- Tree: White oak

Inanimate insignia
- Beverage: Milk
- Dance: Square dance
- Dinosaur: Astrodon johnstoni
- Food: Smith Island cake
- Fossil: Ecphora gardnerae gardnerae
- Gemstone: Patuxent River stone
- Mineral: Chromite
- Ship: Skipjack
- Sport: Jousting; Lacrosse

State route marker

State quarter
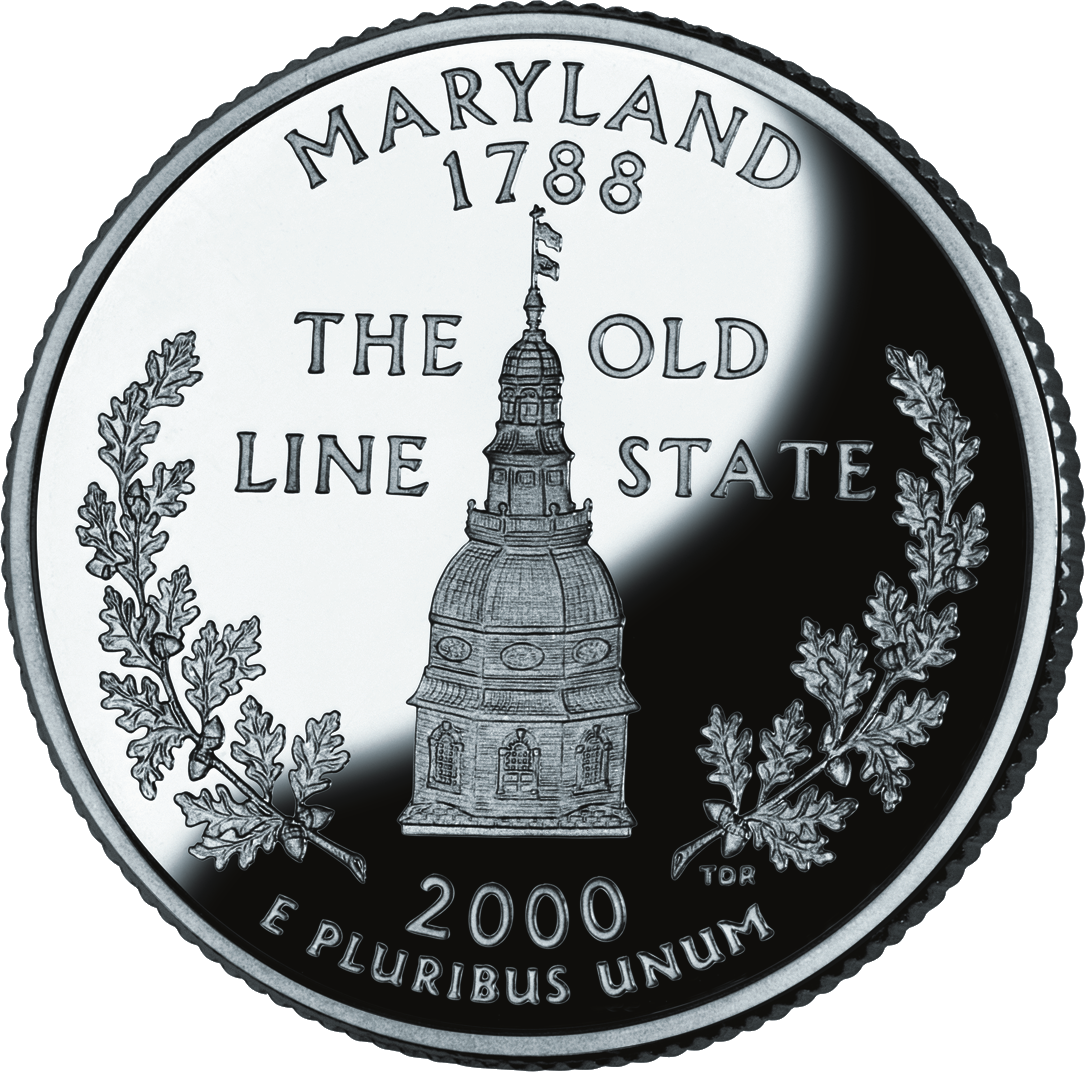
- Released in 2000

Maryland (US: /ˈmɛrələnd/) (Note: In American English, the first syllable is pronounced /ˈmɛr-/ even by the minority of speakers who contrast the vowels in merry /ˈmɛri/ and Mary /ˈmɛəri/. The pronunciation /ˈmɛərɪlənd/ MAIR-il-ənd is the predominant one in British Received Pronunciation.) is a state in the Mid-Atlantic and Southeastern regions of the United States. It borders Virginia to its south, West Virginia to its west, Pennsylvania to its north, and Delaware to its east, as well as with the Atlantic Ocean to its east, and the national capital and federal district of Washington, D.C. to the southwest. With a total area of 12,407 square miles (32,130 km^{2}), Maryland is the ninth-smallest state by land area, and its population of 6.1 million ranks it the 19th-most populous state and the fifth-most densely populated. Maryland's capital city is Annapolis, and the state's most populous city is Baltimore.

Maryland's coastline was first explored by Europeans in the 16th century. Prior to that, it was inhabited by several Native American tribes, mostly the Algonquian peoples. One of the original Thirteen Colonies, the charter for the Province of Maryland was petitioned and secured in 1632 by George Calvert, 1st Baron Baltimore and Cecil Calvert, 2nd Baron Baltimore, and the land first settled in 1634, primarily to provide a religious haven for Catholics persecuted in England. Religious strife was common in Maryland's early years, and Catholics remained a minority, albeit in greater numbers than in any other English colony. Its economy was heavily plantation-based and centered mostly on the cultivation of tobacco. Demand for cheap labor from Maryland colonists led to the importation of numerous indentured servants and enslaved Africans. In 1760, Maryland's current boundaries took form following the settlement of a long-running border dispute with Pennsylvania. Although it was a slave state, Maryland remained in the Union during the American Civil War due to Abraham Lincoln leaving the National Guard there. Its proximity to Washington D.C. and Virginia made it a significant strategic location. After the Civil War ended in 1865, Maryland took part in the Industrial Revolution, driven by its seaports, railroad networks, and mass immigration from Europe.

Since the 1940s, the state's population has grown rapidly, to approximately six million residents, and it is among the most densely populated U.S. states. As of 2015, Maryland had the highest median household income of any state, owing in large part to its proximity to Washington, D.C., and a highly diversified economy spanning manufacturing, retail services, public administration, real estate, higher education, information technology, defense contracting, health care, and biotechnology. Maryland is one of the most multicultural states in the country; it is one of the nine states where non-Whites compose a majority of the population, with the fifth-highest percentage of African Americans, and high numbers of residents born in Africa, Asia, Central America, and the Caribbean. The state's central role in U.S. history is reflected by its hosting of some of the highest numbers of historic landmarks per capita.

The western portion of the state contains stretches of the Appalachian Mountains, the central portion is primarily composed of the Piedmont, and the eastern side of the state makes up a significant portion of the Chesapeake Bay. Sixteen of Maryland's twenty-three counties, and the city of Baltimore, border the tidal waters of the Chesapeake Bay estuary and its many tributaries, which combined total more than 4,000 miles of shoreline. Although one of the smallest states in the U.S., it features a variety of climates and topographical features that have earned it the moniker of America in Miniature. Maryland's geography, culture, and history are diverse, including elements of the Mid-Atlantic, Northeastern, and Southern regions of the country.

== History ==
=== 17th century ===
==== Maryland's first colonial settlement ====
Present-day Maryland was originally inhabited by native tribes such as the Piscataway (including the Patuxent), the Nanticoke (including the Tocwogh, the Ozinie and other subdivisions), the Powhatan, the Lenape, the Susquehannock, the Shawnee, the Tutelo, the Saponi, the Pocomoke and the Massawomeck. George Calvert, 1st Baron Baltimore (1579–1632), sought a charter from King Charles I for the territory between Massachusetts to the north and Virginia to the immediate south. After Baltimore died in April 1632, the charter was granted to his son, Cecilius Calvert, 2nd Baron Baltimore (1605–1675), on June 20, 1632. Officially, the new "Maryland Colony" was named in honor of Henrietta Maria of France, wife of Charles I. Lord Baltimore initially proposed the name "Crescentia", the land of growth or increase, but "the King proposed Terra Mariae [Mary Land], which was concluded on and inserted in the bill."

The original capital of Maryland was St. Mary's City, on the north shore of the Potomac River, and the county surrounding it was the first erected and created in the province, first called Augusta Carolina, after the King, and later named St. Mary's County.

Lord Baltimore's first settlers arrived in the new colony in March 1634, with his younger brother, Leonard Calvert (1606–1647), as the first provincial Governor of Maryland. They made their first permanent settlement at St. Mary's City in what is now St. Mary's County. They purchased the site from the paramount chief of the region, who was eager to establish trade. St. Mary's became the first capital of Maryland, and remained so for 60 years until 1695. More settlers soon followed. Their tobacco crops were successful and quickly made the new colony profitable. However, given the incidence of malaria, yellow fever, and typhoid, life expectancy in Maryland was about 10 years less than in New England.

==== Persecution of Catholics ====
Maryland was founded to provide a haven for England's Roman Catholic minority. Although Maryland was the most heavily Catholic of the English mainland colonies, the religion was still in the minority, consisting of less than 10% of the total population.

In 1642, several Puritans left Virginia for Maryland and founded the city of Providence, now called Annapolis, on the western shore of the upper Chesapeake Bay. A dispute with traders from Virginia over Kent Island in the Chesapeake led to armed conflict. In 1644, William Claiborne, a Puritan, seized Kent Island while his associate, the pro-Parliament Puritan Richard Ingle, took over St. Mary's. Both used religion as a tool to gain popular support. The two years from 1644 to 1646 when Claiborne and his Puritan associates held sway were known as "The Plundering Time". They captured Jesuit priests, imprisoned them, and then sent them back to England.

In 1646, Leonard Calvert returned with troops, recaptured St. Mary's City, and restored order. The House of Delegates passed the "Act concerning Religion" in 1649, granting religious liberty to all Trinitarian Christians.

In 1650, the Puritans revolted against the proprietary government. "Protestants swept the Catholics out of the legislature ... and religious strife returned." The Puritans set up a new government prohibiting both Roman Catholicism and Anglicanism. The Puritan revolutionary government persecuted Maryland Catholics during its reign, known as the "plundering time". Mobs burned down all the original Catholic churches of southern Maryland. The Puritan rule lasted until 1658, when the Calvert family and Lord Baltimore regained proprietary control and re-enacted the Toleration Act.

After England's Glorious Revolution in 1688, Maryland outlawed Catholicism. In 1704, the Maryland General Assembly prohibited Catholics from operating schools, limited the corporate ownership of property to hamper religious orders from expanding or supporting themselves, and encouraged the conversion of Catholic children. The celebration of the Catholic sacraments was also officially restricted. This state of affairs lasted until after the American Revolutionary War (1775–1783). Wealthy Catholic planters built chapels on their land to practice their religion in relative secrecy.

Into the 18th century, individual priests and lay leaders claimed Maryland farms belonging to the Jesuits as personal property and bequeathed them to evade the legal restrictions on religious organizations' owning property.

=== Border disputes (1681–1760) ===
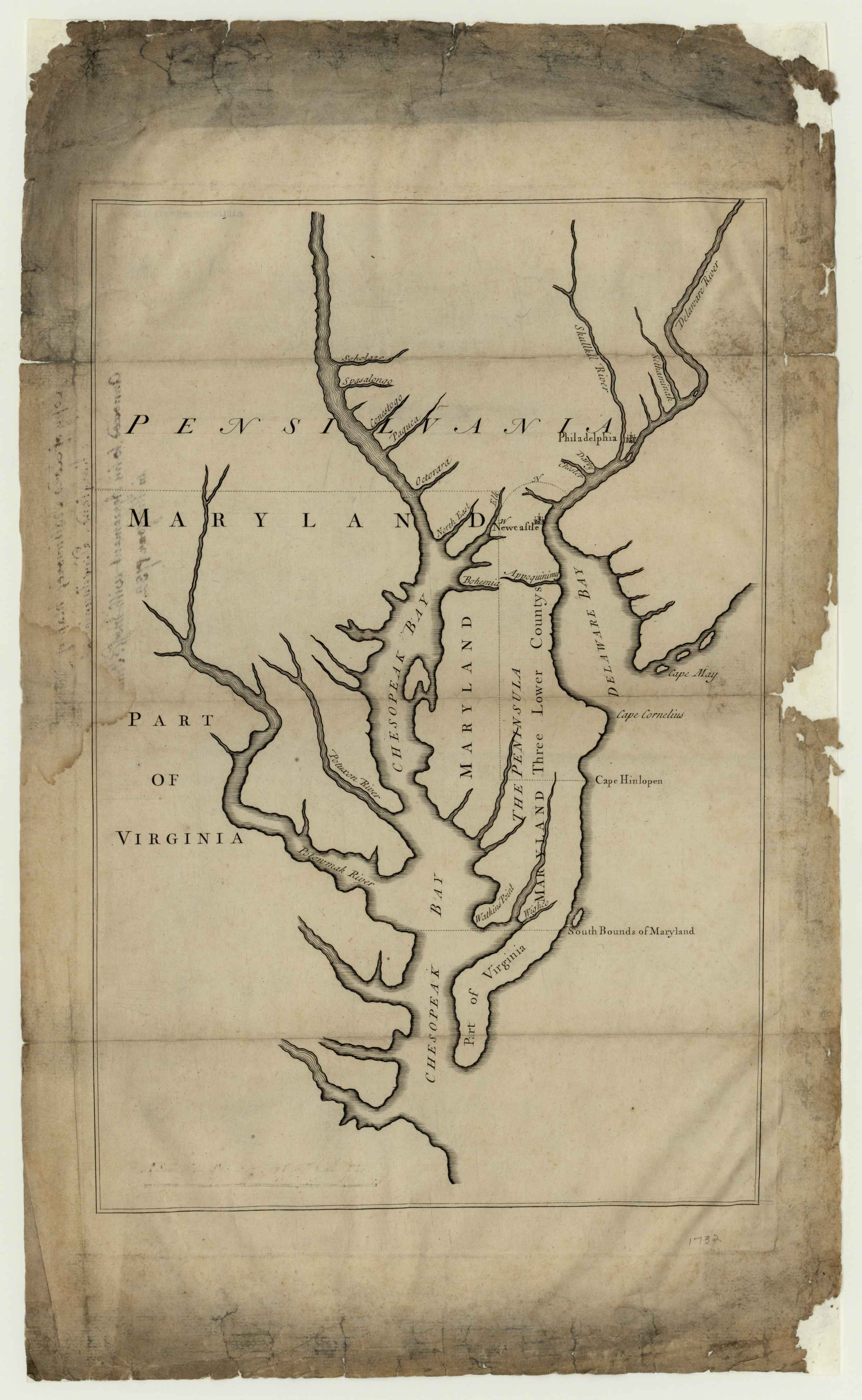
A 1732 map of Maryland

The royal charter granted Maryland the land north of the Potomac River up to the 40th parallel. A problem arose when Charles II granted a charter for the Province of Pennsylvania, which defined Pennsylvania's southern border as the 40th parallel, identical to Maryland's northern border. But the grant indicated that Charles II and William Penn assumed the 40th parallel would pass close to New Castle, Delaware, when it in fact falls north of Philadelphia, which Penn already designated as Pennsylvania's capital city. Negotiations ensued after the problem was discovered in 1681.

A compromise proposed by Charles II in 1682 was undermined by Penn's receiving the additional grant of what is now Delaware. Penn successfully argued that the Maryland charter entitled Lord Baltimore only to unsettled lands, and Dutch settlement in Delaware predated his charter. The dispute remained unresolved for nearly a century, carried on by the descendants of William Penn and Lord Baltimore—the Calvert family, which controlled Maryland, and the Penn family, which controlled Pennsylvania.

The border dispute with Pennsylvania led to Cresap's War in the 1730s. Hostilities erupted in 1730 and escalated through the first half of the decade, culminating in the deployment of military forces by Maryland in 1736 and by Pennsylvania in 1737. The armed phase of the conflict ended in May 1738 with the intervention of King George II, who compelled the negotiation of a cease-fire. A provisional agreement had been established in 1732.

Negotiations continued until a final agreement was signed in 1760. The agreement defined the border between Maryland and Pennsylvania as the line of latitude now known as the Mason–Dixon line. Maryland's border with Delaware was based on the Transpeninsular Line and the Twelve-Mile Circle around New Castle.

=== 18th century ===
Most of the English colonists arrived in Maryland as indentured servants, and had to serve a several-year term as laborers to pay for their passage. In the early years, the line between indentured servants and African slaves or laborers was fluid, and white and black laborers commonly lived and worked together, and formed unions. Mixed-race children born to white mothers were considered free by the principle of partus sequitur ventrem, by which children took the social status of their mothers, a principle of slave law that was adopted throughout the colonies, following Virginia in 1662.

Many of the free black families migrated to Delaware, where land was cheaper. As the flow of indentured laborers to the colony decreased with improving economic conditions in England, planters in Maryland imported thousands more slaves and racial caste lines hardened.

Maryland was one of the thirteen colonies that revolted against British rule in the American Revolution. Near the end of the American Revolutionary War (1775–1783), on February 2, 1781, Maryland became the last and 13th state to approve the ratification of the Articles of Confederation and Perpetual Union, first proposed in 1776 and adopted by the Second Continental Congress in 1778, which brought into being the United States as a united, sovereign and national state. It also became the seventh state admitted to the Union after ratifying the new federal Constitution in 1788. In December 1790, prior to the move of the national capital from Philadelphia in 1800, Maryland donated land selected by first President George Washington to the federal government towards creation of the Washington, D.C. The land was provided along the north shore of the Potomac River from Montgomery and Prince George's counties, as well as from Fairfax County and Alexandria on the south shore of the Potomac in Virginia; however, the land donated by the Commonwealth of Virginia was later returned to that state by the District of Columbia retrocession in 1846.

=== 19th century ===
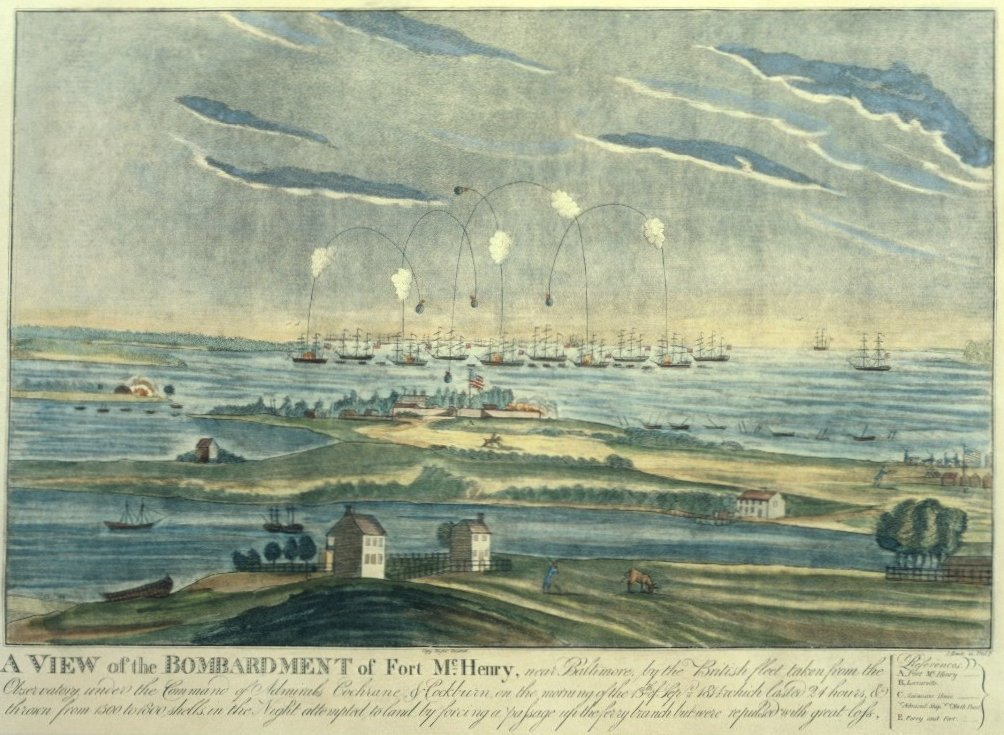
The bombardment of Fort McHenry in the Battle of Baltimore, which inspired "The Star-Spangled Banner"

Influenced by a changing economy, revolutionary ideals, and preaching by ministers, numerous planters in Maryland freed their slaves in the 20 years after the Revolutionary War. Across the Upper South the free black population increased from less than 1% before the war to 14% by 1810. Abolitionists Harriet Tubman and Frederick Douglass were born slaves during this time in Dorchester County and Talbot County, respectively.

During the War of 1812, the British military attempted to capture Baltimore, which was protected by Fort McHenry. During its bombardment, the song "The Star-Spangled Banner" was written by Francis Scott Key; it was later adopted as the national anthem. The Francis Scott Key Bridge (renamed after him in 1976) located across the Patapsco River in Baltimore metropolitan area was struck by a container ship Dali on March 26, 2024, causing it to collapse.

National Road, later renamed U.S. Route 40, was authorized in 1817 as the federal highway, and ran from Baltimore to St. Louis. The Baltimore and Ohio Railroad, the first chartered railroad in the United States, opened its first section of track for regular operation in 1830 between Baltimore and Ellicott City, and in 1852 it became the first rail line to reach the Ohio River from the eastern seaboard.

==== Civil War ====
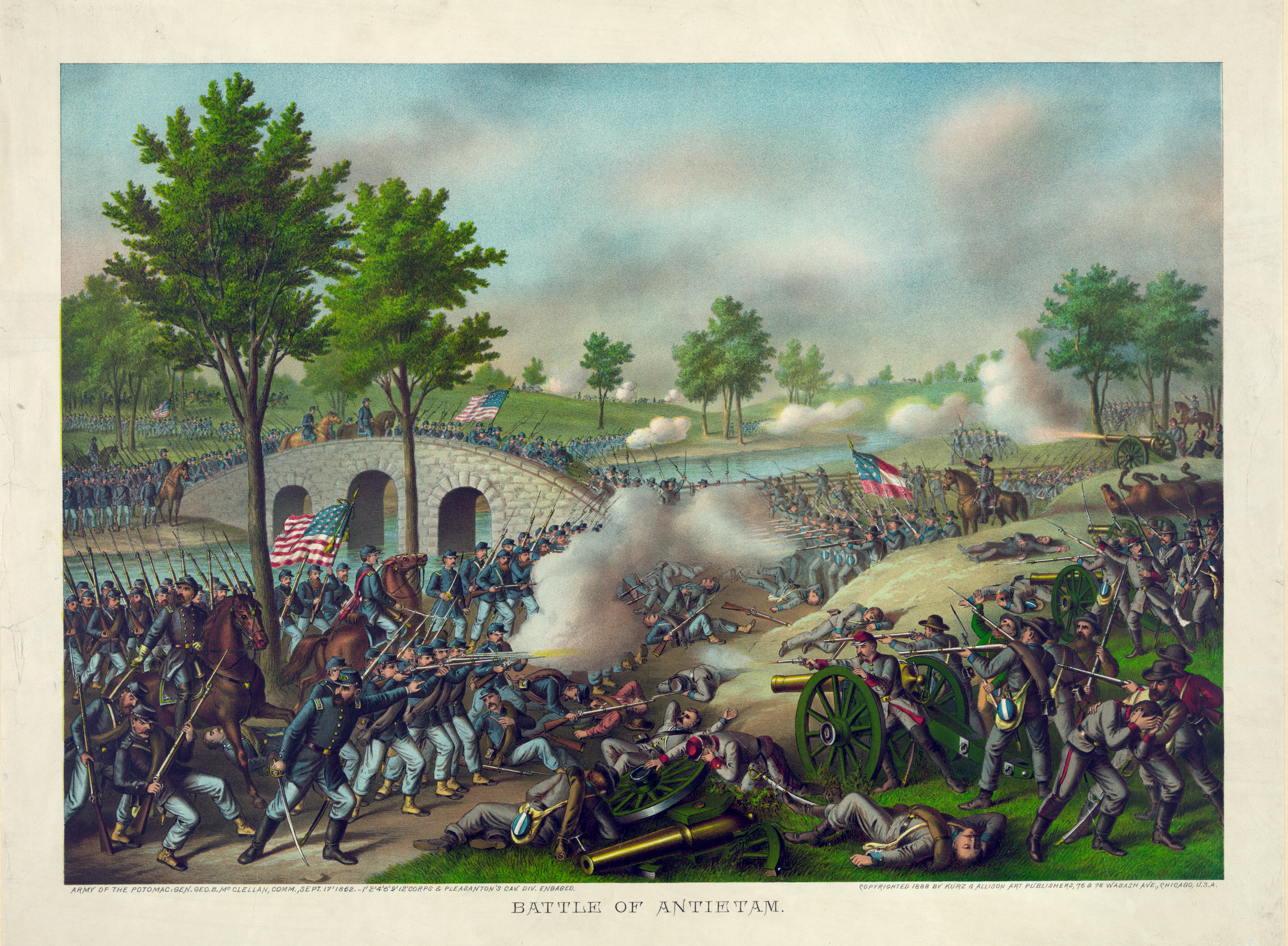
The Battle of Antietam in 1862, one of the bloodiest battles of the American Civil War, with nearly 23,000 casualties

The state remained in the Union during the American Civil War, due in significant part to demographics and Federal intervention. The 1860 census, held shortly before the outbreak of the civil war, showed that 49% of Maryland's African Americans were free.

Governor Thomas Holliday Hicks suspended the state legislature, and to help ensure the election of a new pro-union governor and legislature, President Abraham Lincoln had a number of its pro-slavery politicians arrested, including the Mayor of Baltimore, George William Brown; suspended several civil liberties, including habeas corpus; and ordered artillery placed on Federal Hill overlooking Baltimore.

In April 1861, Federal units and state regiments were attacked as they marched through Baltimore, sparking the Baltimore riot of 1861, the first bloodshed in the Civil War. The largest and most significant battle in the state was the Battle of Antietam on September 17, 1862, near Sharpsburg. Although a tactical draw, the battle was considered a strategic Union victory and a turning point of the war.

==== Post-Civil War ====
A new state constitution in 1864 abolished slavery and Maryland was first recognized as a "Free State" in that context. Following passage of constitutional amendments that granted voting rights to freedmen, in 1867 the state extended suffrage to non-white males.

The Democratic Party rapidly regained power in the state from Republicans. Democrats replaced the Constitution of 1864 with the Constitution of 1867. Following the end of Reconstruction in 1877, Democrats devised means of disenfranchising blacks, initially by physical intimidation and voter fraud, later by constitutional amendments and laws. Blacks and immigrants, however, resisted Democratic Party disfranchisement efforts in the state. Maryland blacks were part of a biracial Republican coalition elected to state government in 1896–1904 and comprised 20% of the electorate.

Compared to some other states, blacks were better established both before and after the civil war. Nearly half the black population was free before the war, and some had accumulated property. Half the population lived in cities. Literacy was high among blacks and, as Democrats crafted means to exclude them, suffrage campaigns helped reach blacks and teach them how to resist. Whites did impose racial segregation in public facilities and Jim Crow laws, which effectively lasted until the passage of federal civil rights legislation in the mid-1960s.

Baltimore grew significantly during the Industrial Revolution, due in large part to its seaport and good railroad connections, attracting European immigrant labor. Many manufacturing businesses were established in the Baltimore area after the Civil War. Baltimore businessmen, including Johns Hopkins, Enoch Pratt, George Peabody, and Henry Walters, founded notable city institutions that bear their names, including respectively a university, library system, music and dance conservatory, and art museum.

Cumberland was Maryland's second-largest city in the 19th century. Nearby supplies of natural resources along with railroads fostered its growth into a major manufacturing center.

=== 20th century ===
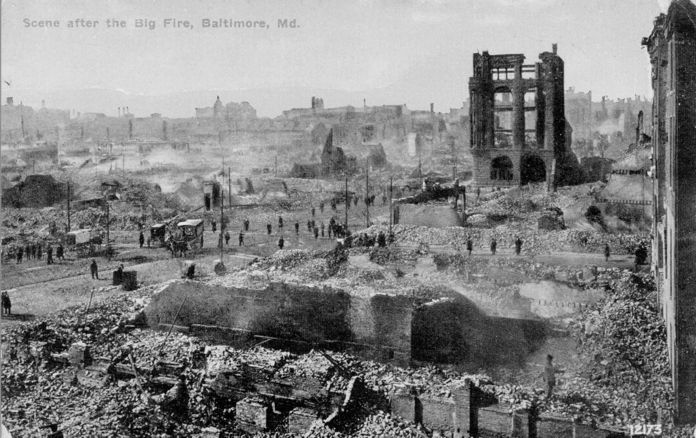
The ruins left by the Great Baltimore Fire of 1904

The Progressive Era of the late 19th and early 20th centuries brought political reforms. In a series of laws passed between 1892 and 1908, reformers worked for standard state-issued ballots (rather than those distributed and marked by the parties); obtained closed voting booths to prevent party workers from "assisting" voters; initiated primary elections to keep party bosses from selecting candidates; and had candidates listed without party symbols, which discouraged the illiterate from participating. These measures worked against ill-educated whites and blacks. The measures were led by the Democratic Party, which sought to disenfranchise Blacks, who were becoming an important part of the Republican Party. Blacks resisted such efforts, with suffrage groups conducting voter education. Blacks defeated three efforts to disenfranchise them, making alliances with immigrants to resist various Democratic campaigns. Disenfranchisement bills in 1905, 1907, and 1911 were rebuffed, largely due to black opposition. Blacks comprised 20% of the electorate and immigrants comprised 15%, and the legislature had difficulty devising requirements against blacks that did not also disadvantage immigrants.

The Progressive Era also brought reforms in working conditions for Maryland's labor force. In 1902, the state regulated conditions in mines; outlawed child laborers under the age of 14; mandated compulsory school attendance for children between ages eight and twelve; and enacted the nation's first workers' compensation law. The workers' compensation law was overturned in the courts, but was redrafted and finally enacted in 1910. A 1906 law forbade the employment of children in Baltimore City, but many companies continued to employ children, especially in vegetable canneries. Photographer, Lewis Hine, documented child labor in Maryland factories and on farms during this era. In 1912, a Maryland law prohibited employment of children under 12 in canneries, but child labor in canneries continued into the 1920s.

The Great Baltimore Fire of 1904 burned for more than 30 hours, destroying 1,526 buildings and spanning 70 city blocks. More than 1,231 firefighters worked to bring the blaze under control.

In 1904, John Prentiss Poe and Arthur Pue Gorman authored the "Poe Suffrage Amendment" which sought to disenfranchise African American voters in Maryland by implementing grandfather and "understanding" clauses. Both clauses would have disenfranchised African American and white immigrant voters. The Negro Suffrage League and the League of Foreign-Born Citizens fiercely opposed the amendment. Though the amendment passed in the Democrat controlled legistlature in 1904, it was defeated at the polls by voters in 1905.

With the nation's entry into World War I in 1917, new military bases such as Camp Meade, the Aberdeen Proving Ground, and the Edgewood Arsenal were established. Existing facilities, including Fort McHenry, were greatly expanded.

After Georgia congressman William D. Upshaw criticized Maryland openly in 1923 for not passing Prohibition laws, Baltimore Sun editor Hamilton Owens coined the "Free State" nickname for Maryland in that context, which was popularized by H. L. Mencken in a series of newspaper editorials.

Maryland's urban and rural communities had different experiences during the Great Depression. The "Bonus Army" marched through the state in 1932 on its way to Washington, D.C. Maryland instituted its first income tax in 1937 to generate revenue for schools and welfare.

Passenger and freight steamboat service, once important throughout Chesapeake Bay and its many tributary rivers, ended in 1962.

==== World War II Era ====
Baltimore was a major war production center during World War II. The biggest operations were Bethlehem Steel's Fairfield Yard, which built Liberty ships; and Glenn Martin, an aircraft manufacturer.

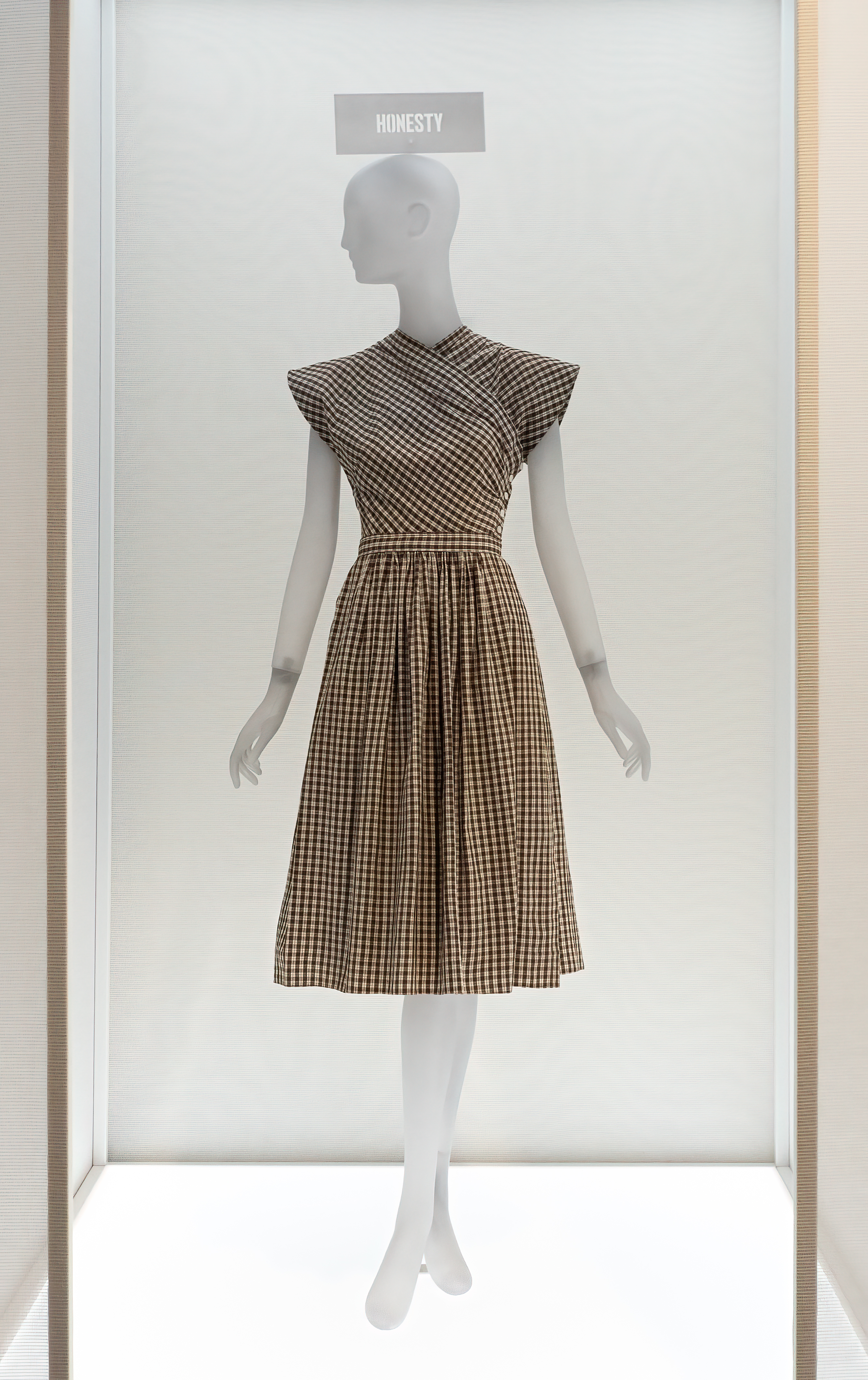
Dress by Claire McCardell from 1943.

During the war, Maryland born fashion designer, Claire McCardell, designed Civil Defense uniforms. Wartime fabric rationing of wool and silk influenced McCardell's use of denim, calico, jersey, and surplus weather balloon fabric in her women's wear designs. With women performing more labor during the war, McCardell designed a popular utility dress for women called the Pop-over that could be worn both in and out of the house.

=== Mid 20th Century ===
Maryland experienced population growth following World War II. Beginning in the 1960s, as suburban growth took hold around Washington, D.C. and Baltimore, the state began to take on a more mid-Atlantic culture as opposed to the traditionally Southern and Tidewater culture that previously dominated most of the state. Agricultural tracts gave way to residential communities, some of them carefully planned such as Columbia, St. Charles, and Montgomery Village. Concurrently the Interstate Highway System was built throughout the state, most notably I-95, I-695, and the Capital Beltway, altering travel patterns. In 1952, the eastern and western halves of Maryland were linked for the first time by the Chesapeake Bay Bridge, which replaced a nearby ferry service.

Maryland's regions experienced economic changes following WWII. Heavy manufacturing declined in Baltimore. In Maryland's four westernmost counties, industrial, railroad, and coal mining jobs declined. On the lower Eastern Shore, family farms were bought up by major concerns and large-scale poultry farms and vegetable farming became prevalent. In Southern Maryland, tobacco farming nearly vanished due to suburban development and a state tobacco buy-out program in the 1990s.

In an effort to reverse depopulation due to the loss of working-class industries, Baltimore initiated urban renewal projects in the 1960s with Charles Center and the Baltimore World Trade Center. Some resulted in the break-up of intact residential neighborhoods, producing social volatility, and some older residential areas around the harbor have had units renovated and have become popular with new populations.

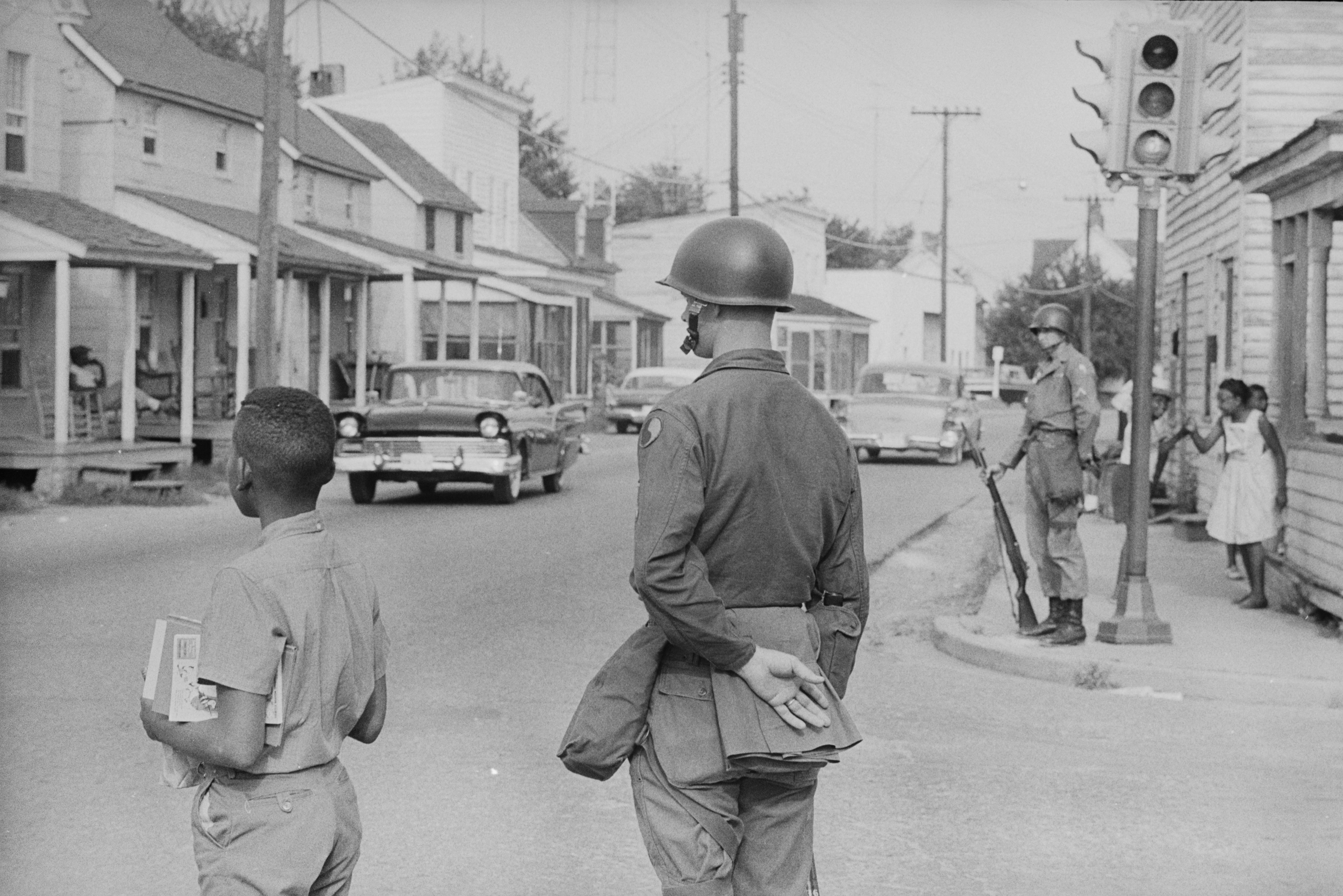
African-Americans and Maryland National Guard troops on the street, during period when demonstrations against segregation were held in Cambridge, Maryland in 1963.

==== Civil Rights Movement in Maryland ====
Jim Crow laws existed throughout much of the state until the 1960s. Notable events during this era in Maryland include the desegregation of Glen Echo Park in 1961, the desegregation of Gwynn Oak Park in 1963, the Cambridge Movement of 1963, The Cambridge Movement of 1967, the Route 40 Freedom Rides in 1961, and more.

== Geography ==
Physical regions of Maryland

Maryland has an area of 12,406.68 square miles (32,133.2 km^{2}) and is comparable in overall area with Belgium. It is the 42nd-largest and 9th-smallest state and is closest in size to the state of Hawaii that, with its 10,930.98 square miles (28,311.1 km^{2}), is the next smallest state. The next largest state is Maryland's neighbor, West Virginia, which is nearly twice the size of Maryland with its area of 24,229.76 square miles (62,754.8 km^{2}).

=== Description ===
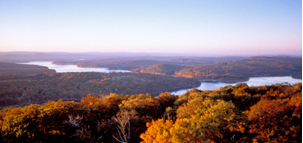
Western Maryland is known for its heavily forested mountains. A panoramic view of Deep Creek Lake and the surrounding Appalachian Mountains in Garrett County.

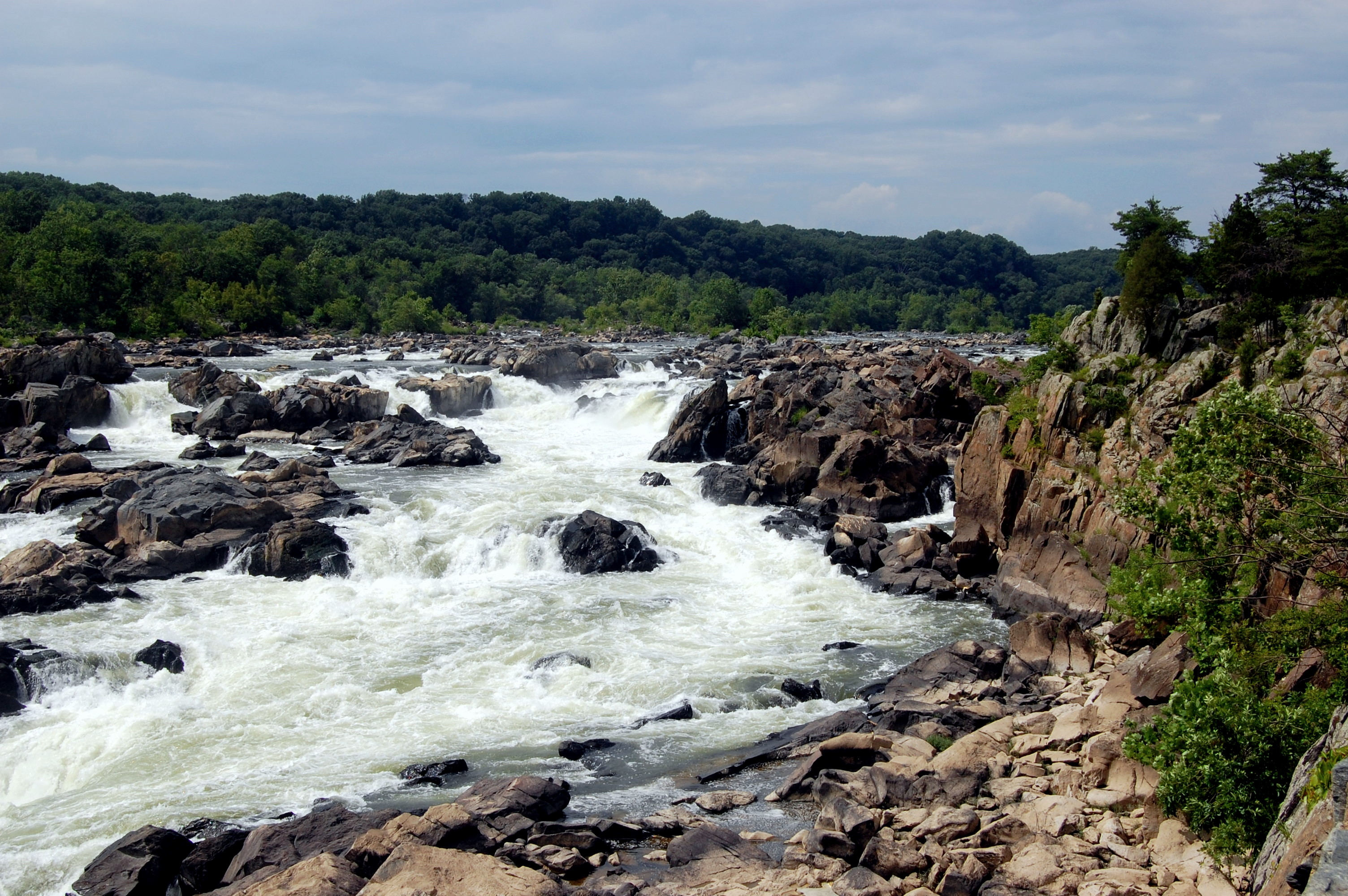
Great Falls on the Potomac River

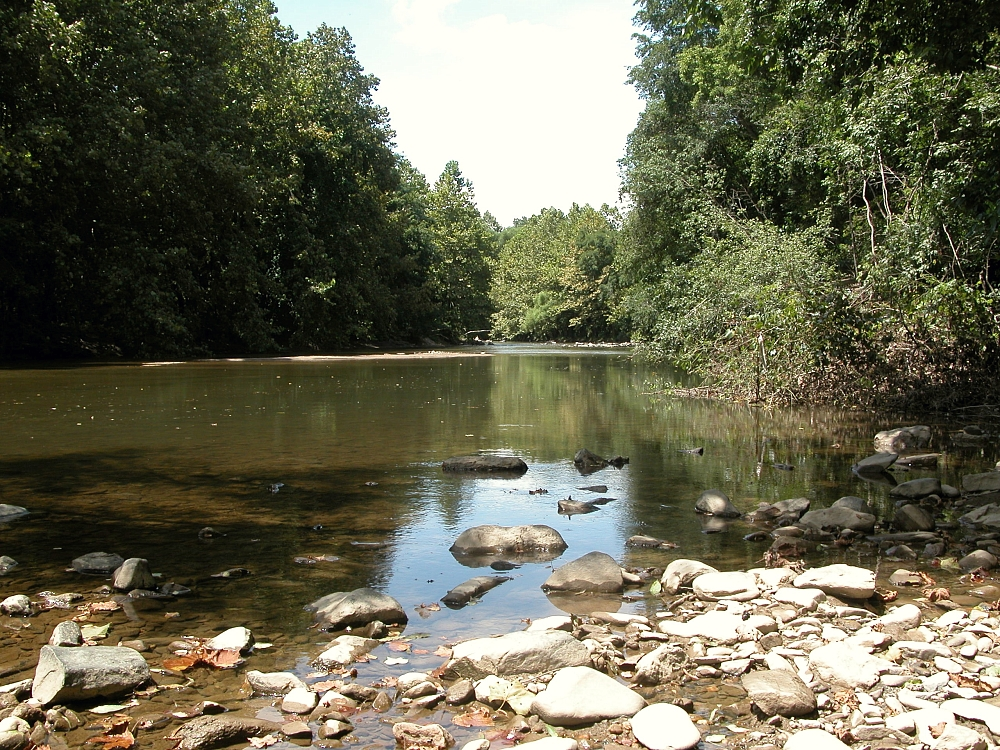
Patapsco River includes the Thomas Viaduct and is part of the Patapsco Valley State Park; the river forms Baltimore's Inner Harbor as it empties into the Chesapeake Bay.

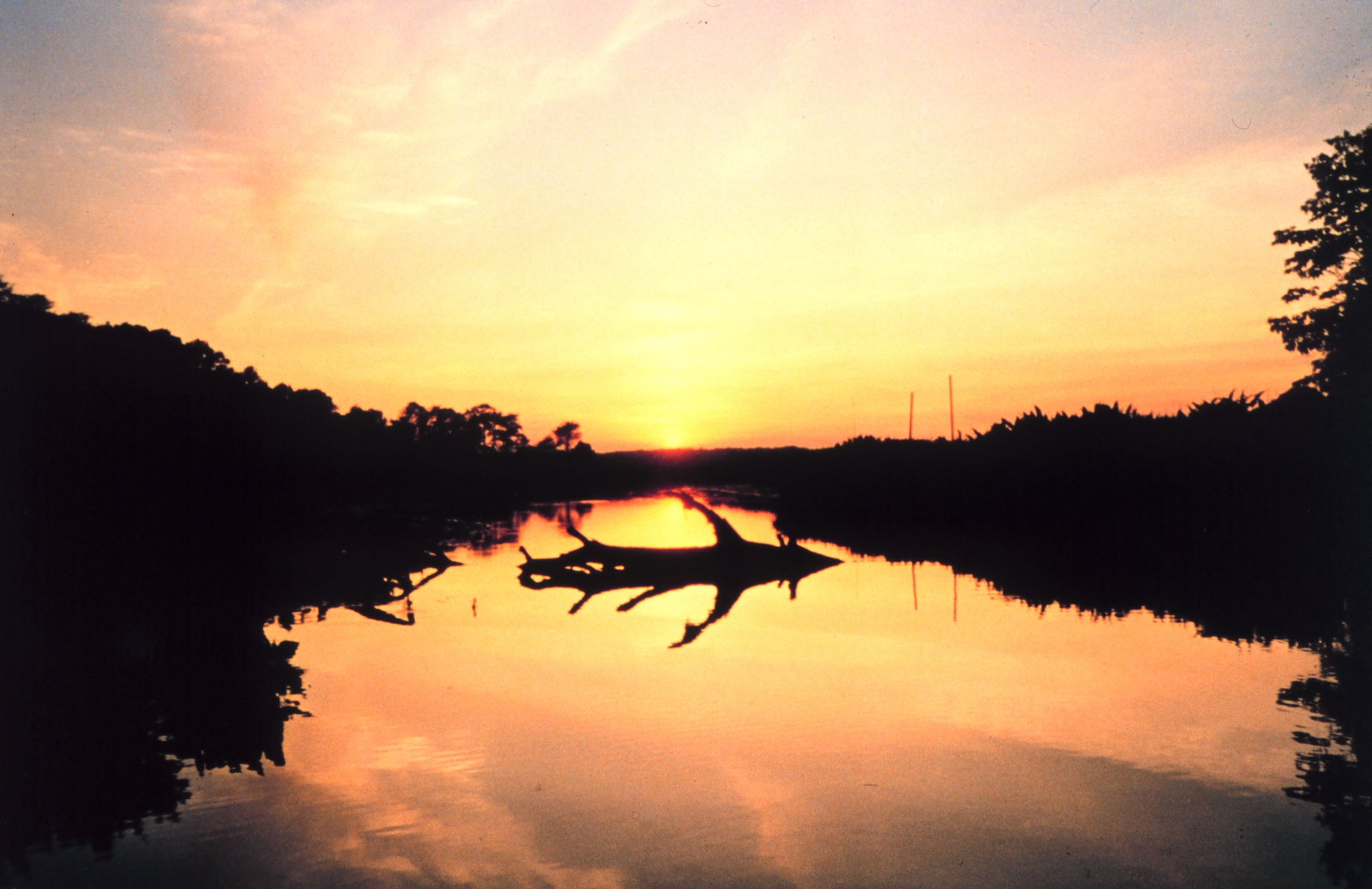
Sunset over a marsh at Cardinal Cove on the Patuxent River

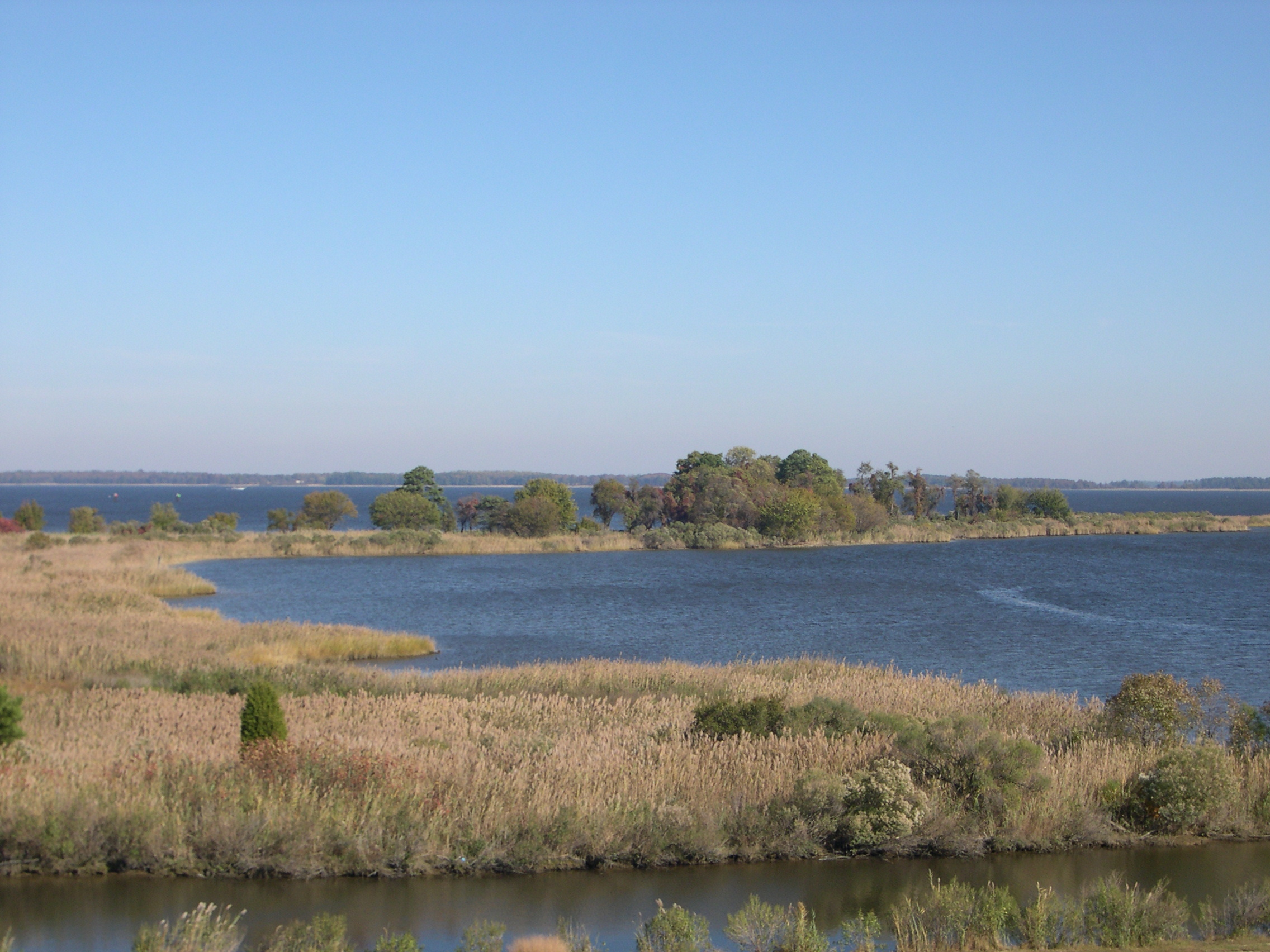
Tidal wetlands of the Chesapeake Bay, the largest estuary in the nation and the largest water feature in Maryland

Maryland possesses a variety of topography within its borders, contributing to its nickname America in Miniature. It ranges from sandy dunes dotted with seagrass in the east, to low marshlands teeming with wildlife and large bald cypress near the Chesapeake Bay, to gently rolling hills of oak forests in the Piedmont Region, and pine groves in the Maryland mountains to the west.

Maryland is bounded on its north by Pennsylvania, on its north and east by Delaware, on its east by the Atlantic Ocean, and on its south and west, across the Potomac River, by West Virginia and Virginia. The mid-portion of its border with Virginia is interrupted by Washington, D.C., which sits on land that was originally part of Montgomery and Prince George's counties and including Georgetown, Maryland, which was ceded to the United States federal government in 1790 to form the Washington, D.C. Chesapeake Bay nearly bisects the state, and the counties east of the bay are known collectively as the Eastern Shore.

Most of the state's waterways are part of the Chesapeake Bay watershed, with the exceptions of a tiny portion of extreme western Garrett County (drained by the Youghiogheny River as part of the watershed of the Mississippi River), the eastern half of Worcester County (which drains into Maryland's Atlantic coastal bays), and a small portion of the state's northeast corner (which drains into the Delaware River watershed). So prominent is the Chesapeake in Maryland's geography and economic life that there has been periodic agitation to change the state's official nickname to the "Bay State", a nickname that has been used by Massachusetts for decades.

The highest point in Maryland, with an elevation of 3,360 feet (1,020 m), is Hoye Crest on Backbone Mountain, in the southwest corner of Garrett County, near the border with West Virginia, and near the headwaters of the North Branch of the Potomac River. Close to the small town of Hancock, in western Maryland, about two-thirds of the way across the state, less than 2 miles (3.2 km) separates its borders, the Mason–Dixon line to the north, and the northwards-arching Potomac River to the south.

Portions of Maryland are included in various official and unofficial geographic regions. For example, the Delmarva Peninsula is composed of the Eastern Shore counties of Maryland, the entire state of Delaware, and the two counties that make up the Eastern Shore of Virginia, whereas the westernmost counties of Maryland are considered part of Appalachia. Much of the Baltimore–Washington corridor lies just south of the Piedmont in the Coastal Plain, though it straddles the border between the two regions.

=== Geology ===
Earthquakes in Maryland are infrequent and small due to the state's distance from seismic/earthquake zones. The M5.8 Virginia earthquake in 2011 was felt moderately throughout Maryland. Buildings in the state are not well-designed for earthquakes and can suffer damage easily. As well as this, notably a M4.8 earthquake from Tewksbury in central New Jersey was felt slightly throughout Maryland.

Maryland is the only U.S. state with no natural lakes, mostly due to the lack of glacial history in the area. All lakes in the state today were constructed, mostly via dams. Buckel's Bog is believed by geologists to have been a remnant of a former natural lake.

Maryland has shale formations containing natural gas, where fracking is theoretically possible.

=== Flora ===
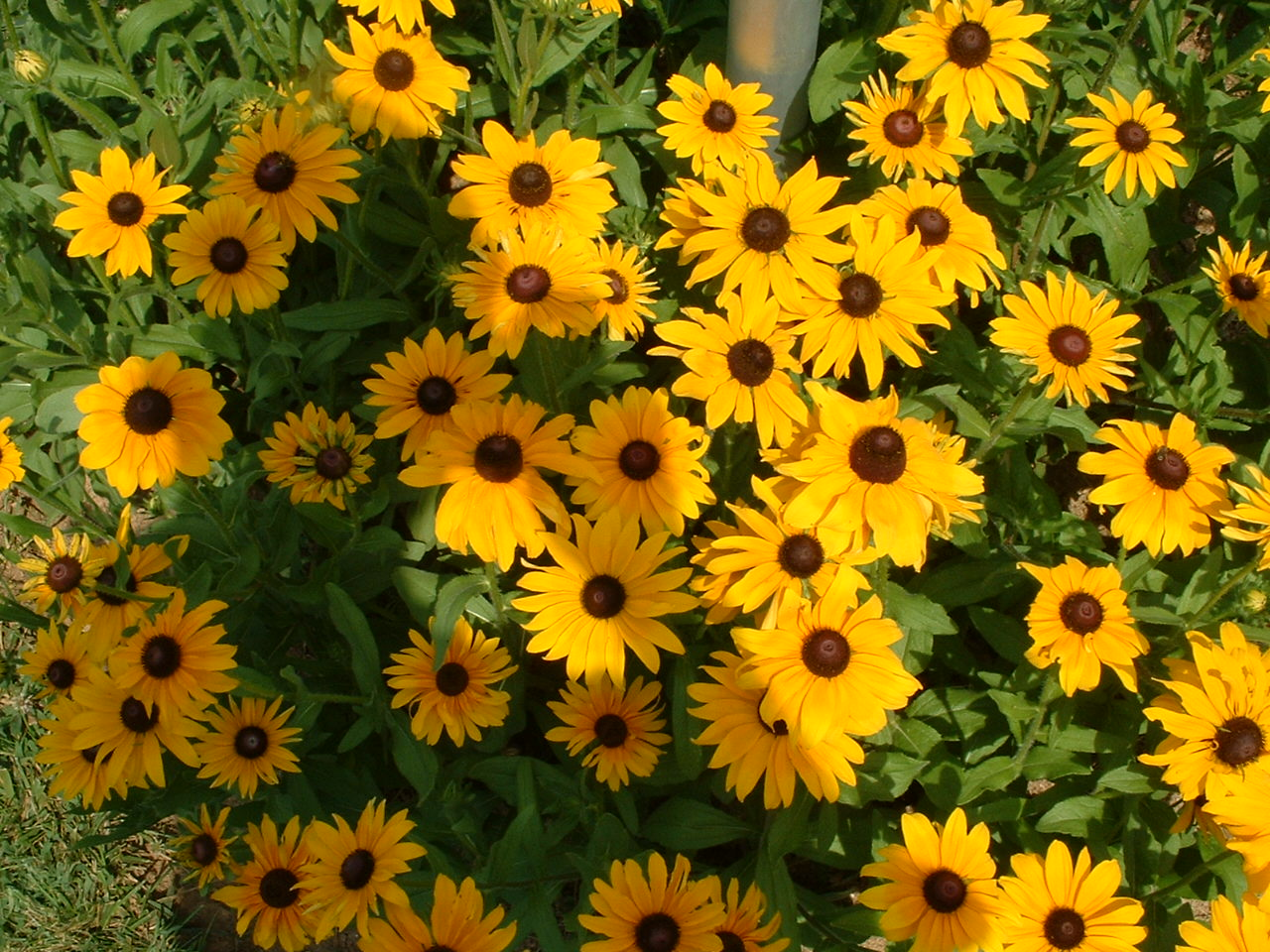
Black-eyed susans, the state flower, grow throughout much of the state.

As is typical of states on the East Coast, Maryland's plant life is abundant and healthy. An adequate volume of annual precipitation helps to support many types of plants, including seagrass and various reeds at the smaller end of the spectrum to the gigantic Wye Oak, a huge example of white oak, the state tree, which can grow over 70 feet (21 m) tall.

Middle Atlantic coastal forests, typical of the southeastern Atlantic coastal plain, grow around Chesapeake Bay and on the Delmarva Peninsula. Moving west, a mixture of Northeastern coastal forests and Southeastern mixed forests cover the central part of the state. The Appalachian Mountains of western Maryland are home to Appalachian-Blue Ridge forests. These give way to Appalachian mixed mesophytic forests near the West Virginia border.

Many foreign species are cultivated in the state, some as ornamentals, others as novelty species. Included among these are the crape myrtle, Italian cypress, southern magnolia, live oak in the warmer parts of the state, and even hardy palm trees in the warmer central and eastern parts of the state. USDA plant hardiness zones in the state range from Zones 5 and 6 in the extreme western part of the state to Zone 7 in the central part, and Zone 8 around the southern part of the coast, the bay area, and parts of metropolitan Baltimore. Invasive plant species, such as kudzu, tree of heaven, multiflora rose, and Japanese stiltgrass, stifle growth of endemic plant life. Maryland's state flower, the black-eyed susan, grows in abundance in wild flower groups throughout the state.

=== Fauna ===
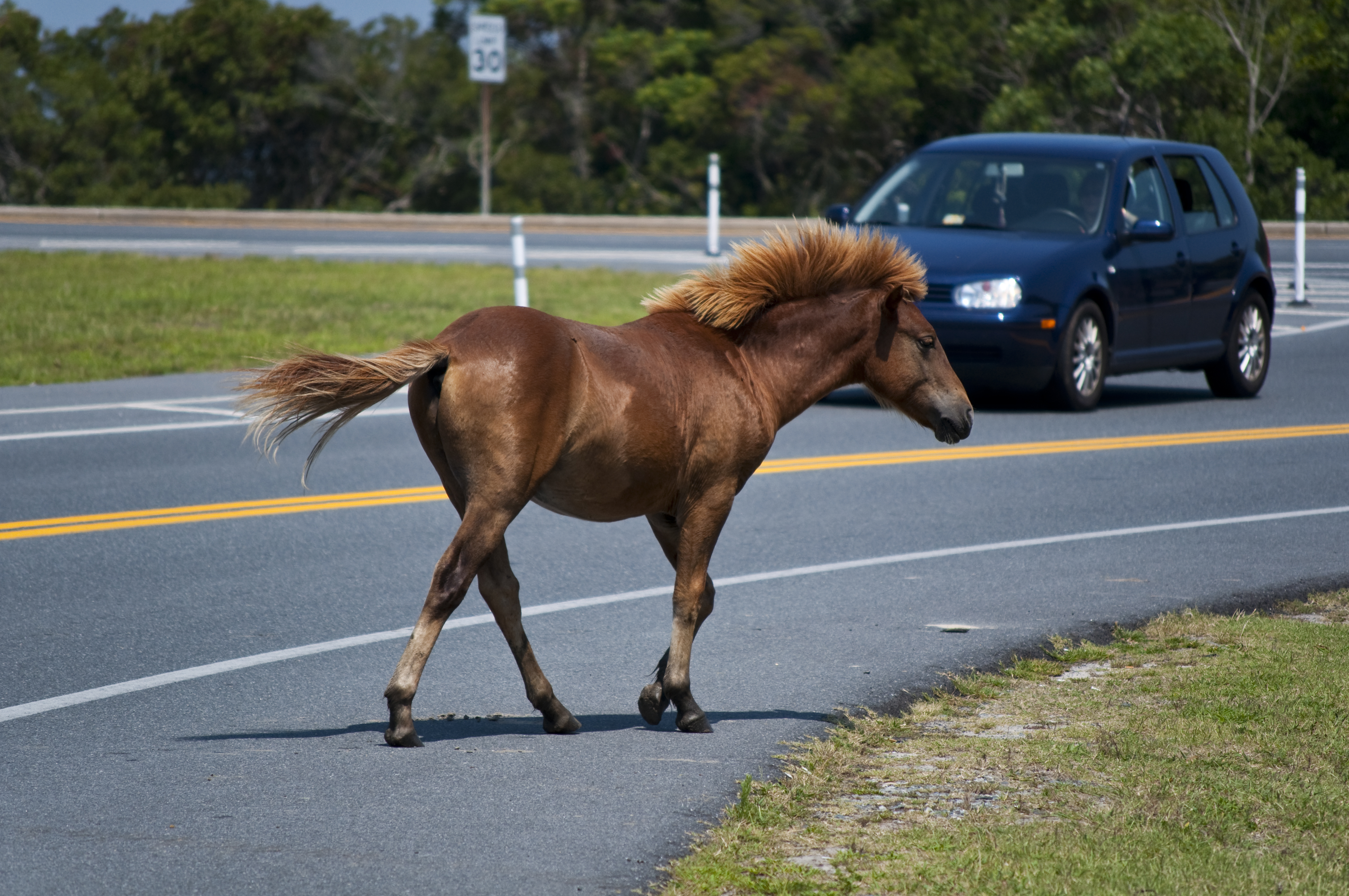
A feral Chincoteague Pony on Assateague Island on Maryland's Atlantic coastal islands

The state harbors a considerable number of white-tailed deer, especially in the woody and mountainous west of the state, and overpopulation can become a problem. Mammals can be found ranging from the mountains in the west to the central areas and include black bears, bobcats, foxes, coyotes, raccoons, and otters.

There is a population of rare wild (feral) horses found on Assateague Island. They are believed to be descended from horses that escaped from Spanish galleon shipwrecks. Every year during the last week of July, they are captured and swim across a shallow bay for sale at Chincoteague, Virginia, a conservation technique which ensures the tiny island is not overrun by the horses. The ponies and their sale were popularized by the children's book, Misty of Chincoteague.

The purebred Chesapeake Bay Retriever dog was bred specifically for water sports, hunting and search and rescue in the Chesapeake area. In 1878, the Chesapeake Bay Retriever was the first individual retriever breed recognized by the American Kennel Club. and was later adopted by the University of Maryland, Baltimore County as their mascot.

Maryland's reptile and amphibian population includes the diamondback terrapin turtle, which was adopted as the mascot of University of Maryland, College Park, as well as the threatened Eastern box turtle. The state is part of the territory of the Baltimore oriole, which is the official state bird and mascot of the MLB team the Baltimore Orioles. Aside from the oriole, 435 other species of birds have been reported from Maryland.

The state insect is the Baltimore checkerspot butterfly, although it is not as common in Maryland as it is in the southern edge of its range.

=== Environment ===
Maryland joined with neighboring states during the end of the 20th century to improve the health of the Chesapeake Bay. The bay's aquatic life and seafood industry have been threatened by development and by fertilizer and livestock waste entering the bay.

In 2007, Forbes.com rated Maryland as the fifth "Greenest" state in the country, behind three of the Pacific States and Vermont. Maryland ranks 40th in total energy consumption nationwide, and it managed less toxic waste per capita than all but six states in 2005. In April 2007, Maryland joined the Regional Greenhouse Gas Initiative (RGGI), formed by all the Northeastern states, Washington, D.C., and three Canadian provinces to reduce greenhouse gas emissions. In March 2017, Maryland became the first state with proven gas reserves to ban fracking by passing a law against it. Vermont has such a law, but no shale gas, and New York has such a ban, though it was made by executive order.

In 2023, AES Corporation announced its intent to retire the 23-year-old Warrior Run coal plant in June 2024. It was the state's last coal-fired power plant that did not already have plans to shut down.

=== Climate ===
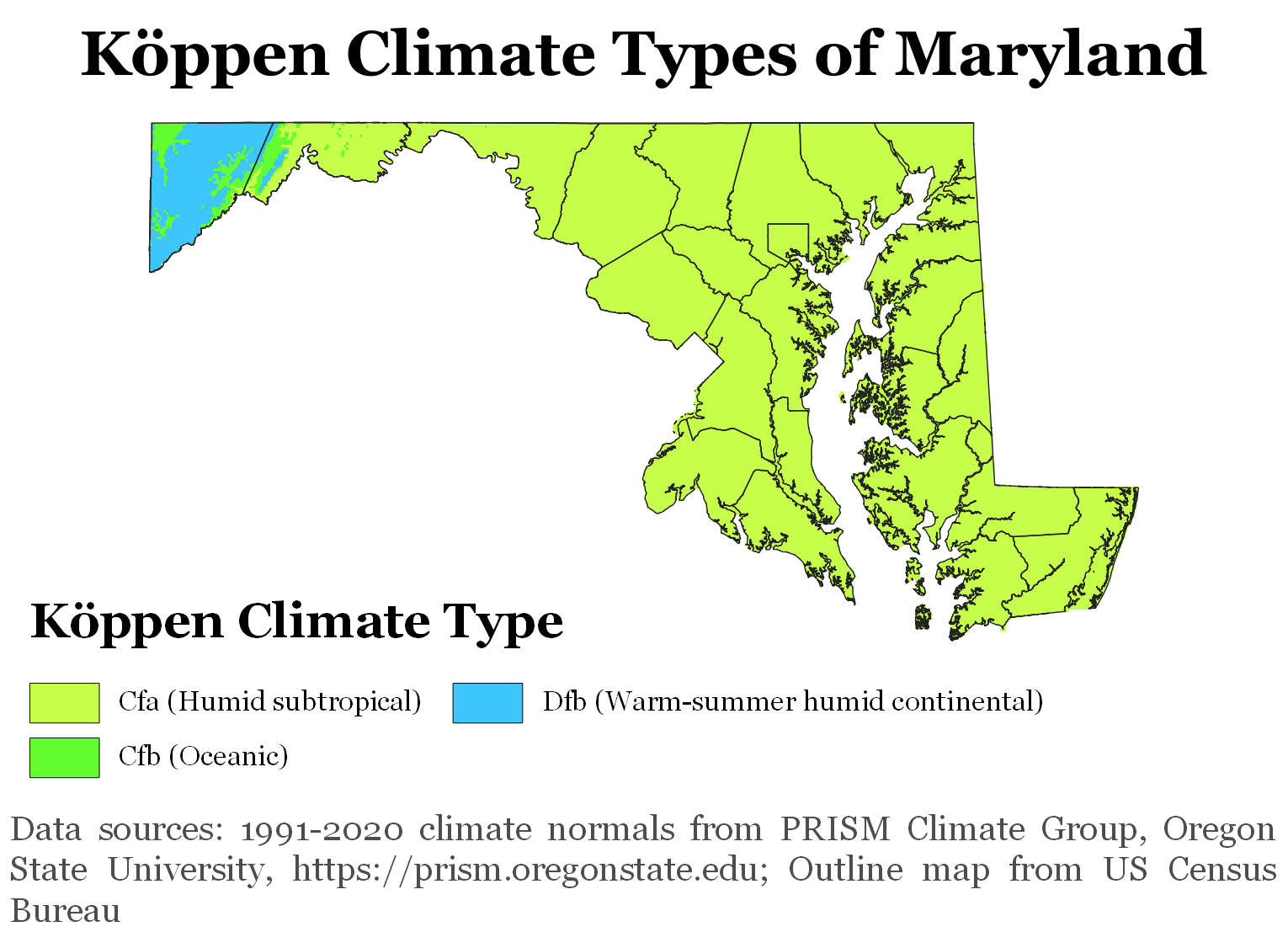
Köppen climate types of Maryland, using 1991–2020 climate normals

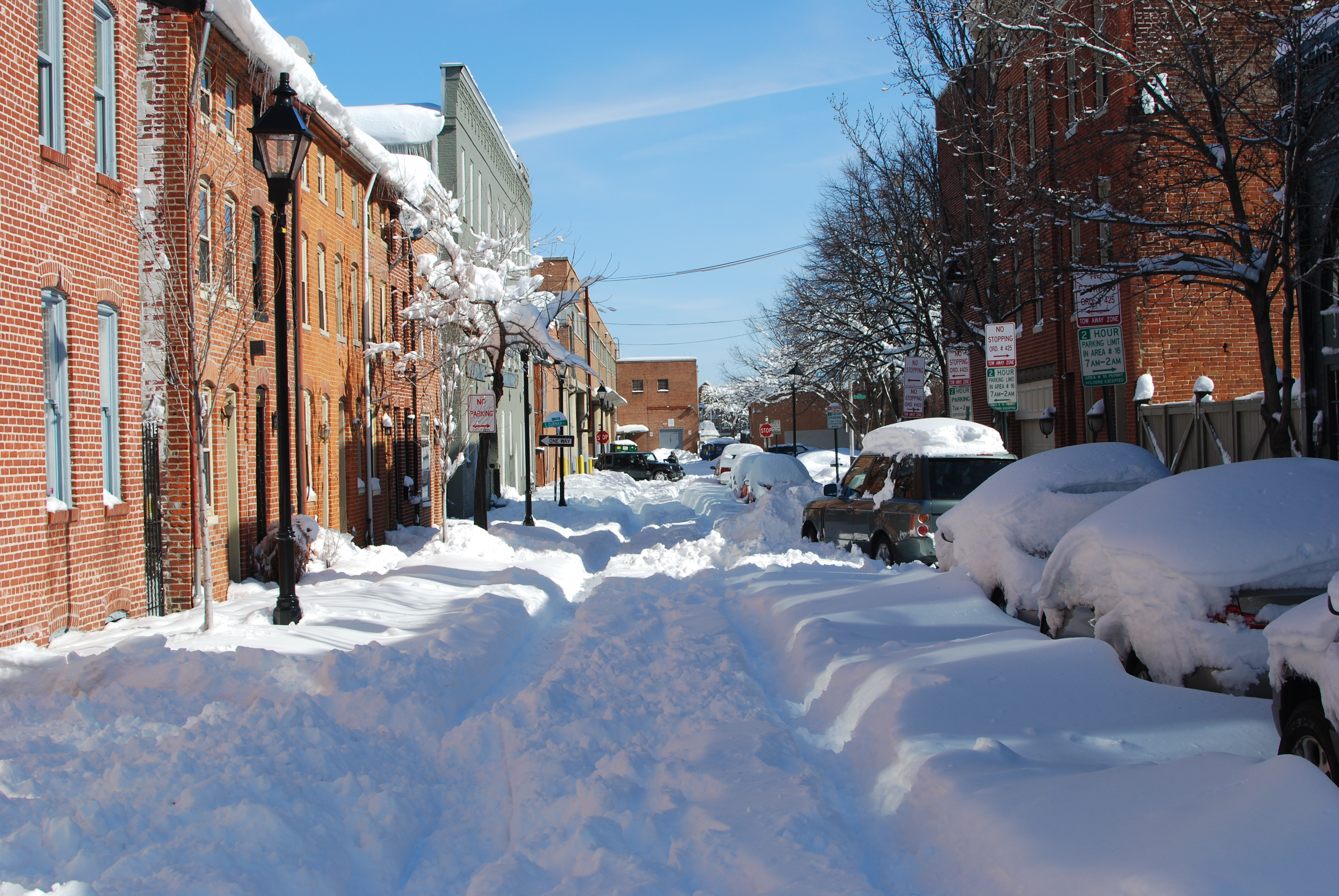
Winter on Lancaster Street in Baltimore's Fells Point after an unusually strong nor'easter.

Maryland has a wide array of climates, due to local variances in elevation, proximity to water, and protection from colder weather due to downslope winds. The eastern half of Maryland, which includes Ocean City, Salisbury, Annapolis, and the southern and eastern suburbs of Washington, D.C., and Baltimore, lies on the Atlantic Coastal Plain, with flat topography and sandy or muddy soil. This region has a humid subtropical climate (Köppen Cfa), with hot, humid summers and cool to cold winters; it falls under USDA Hardiness zone 8a.

The Piedmont region, which includes northern and western greater Baltimore, Westminster, Gaithersburg, Frederick, and Hagerstown, has average seasonal snowfall totals generally exceeding 20 inches (51 cm), and, as part of USDA Hardiness zones 7b and 7a, temperatures below 10 °F (−12 °C) are less rare. From the Cumberland Valley on westward, the climate begins to transition to a humid continental climate (Köppen Dfa).

In Western Maryland, the higher elevations of Allegany and Garrett counties, including the cities of Cumberland, Frostburg, and Oakland, display more characteristics of the humid continental zone, due in part to elevation. They fall under USDA Hardiness zones 6b and below.

Precipitation in the state is characteristic of the East Coast. Annual rainfall ranges from 35 to 45 inches (890 to 1,140 mm) with more in higher elevations. Nearly every part of Maryland receives 3.5–4.5 inches (89–114 mm) per month of rain. Average annual snowfall varies from 9 inches (23 cm) in the coastal areas to over 100 inches (250 cm) in the western mountains of the state.

Because of its location near the Atlantic Coast, Maryland is somewhat vulnerable to tropical cyclones, although the Delmarva Peninsula and the outer banks of North Carolina provide a large buffer, such that strikes from major hurricanes (category 3 or above) occur infrequently. More often, Maryland gets the remnants of a tropical system that has already come ashore and released most of its energy. Maryland averages around 30–40 days of thunderstorms a year, and averages around six tornado strikes annually.

Monthly average high and low temperatures for various Maryland cities and landmarks (covering breadth and width of the state)
City	Jan	Feb	Mar	Apr	May	Jun	Jul	Aug	Sep	Oct	Nov	Dec
Oakland	34 °F (1 °C); 16 °F (−9 °C)	38 °F (3 °C); 17 °F (−8 °C)	48 °F (9 °C); 25 °F (−4 °C)	59 °F (15 °C); 34 °F (1 °C)	68 °F (20 °C); 45 °F (7 °C)	75 °F (24 °C); 53 °F (12 °C)	79 °F (26 °C); 58 °F (14 °C)	78 °F (26 °C); 56 °F (13 °C)	71 °F (22 °C); 49 °F (9 °C)	62 °F (17 °C); 37 °F (3 °C)	50 °F (10 °C); 28 °F (−2 °C)	39 °F (4 °C); 21 °F (−6 °C)
Cumberland	41 °F (5 °C); 22 °F (−6 °C)	46 °F (8 °C); 24 °F (−4 °C)	56 °F (13 °C); 32 °F (0 °C)	68 °F (20 °C); 41 °F (5 °C)	77 °F (25 °C); 51 °F (11 °C)	85 °F (29 °C); 60 °F (16 °C)	89 °F (32 °C); 65 °F (18 °C)	87 °F (31 °C); 63 °F (17 °C)	80 °F (27 °C); 55 °F (13 °C)	69 °F (21 °C); 43 °F (6 °C)	57 °F (14 °C); 34 °F (1 °C)	45 °F (7 °C); 26 °F (−3 °C)
Hagerstown	39 °F (4 °C); 22 °F (−6 °C)	42 °F (6 °C); 23 °F (−5 °C)	52 °F (11 °C); 30 °F (−1 °C)	63 °F (17 °C); 39 °F (4 °C)	72 °F (22 °C); 50 °F (10 °C)	81 °F (27 °C); 59 °F (15 °C)	85 °F (29 °C); 64 °F (18 °C)	83 °F (28 °C); 62 °F (17 °C)	76 °F (24 °C); 54 °F (12 °C)	65 °F (18 °C); 43 °F (6 °C)	54 °F (12 °C); 34 °F (1 °C)	43 °F (6 °C); 26 °F (−3 °C)
Frederick	42 °F (6 °C); 26 °F (−3 °C)	47 °F (8 °C); 28 °F (−2 °C)	56 °F (13 °C); 35 °F (2 °C)	68 °F (20 °C); 45 °F (7 °C)	77 °F (25 °C); 54 °F (12 °C)	85 °F (29 °C); 63 °F (17 °C)	89 °F (32 °C); 68 °F (20 °C)	87 °F (31 °C); 66 °F (19 °C)	80 °F (27 °C); 59 °F (15 °C)	68 °F (20 °C); 47 °F (8 °C)	56 °F (13 °C); 38 °F (3 °C)	45 °F (7 °C); 30 °F (−1 °C)
Baltimore	42 °F (6 °C); 29 °F (−2 °C)	46 °F (8 °C); 31 °F (−1 °C)	54 °F (12 °C); 39 °F (4 °C)	65 °F (18 °C); 48 °F (9 °C)	75 °F (24 °C); 57 °F (14 °C)	85 °F (29 °C); 67 °F (19 °C)	90 °F (32 °C); 72 °F (22 °C)	87 °F (31 °C); 71 °F (22 °C)	80 °F (27 °C); 64 °F (18 °C)	68 °F (20 °C); 52 °F (11 °C)	58 °F (14 °C); 43 °F (6 °C)	46 °F (8 °C); 33 °F (1 °C)
Elkton	42 °F (6 °C); 24 °F (−4 °C)	46 °F (8 °C); 26 °F (−3 °C)	55 °F (13 °C); 32 °F (0 °C)	67 °F (19 °C); 42 °F (6 °C)	76 °F (24 °C); 51 °F (11 °C)	85 °F (29 °C); 61 °F (16 °C)	88 °F (31 °C); 66 °F (19 °C)	87 °F (31 °C); 65 °F (18 °C)	80 °F (27 °C); 57 °F (14 °C)	69 °F (21 °C); 45 °F (7 °C)	58 °F (14 °C); 36 °F (2 °C)	46 °F (8 °C); 28 °F (−2 °C)
Ocean City	45 °F (7 °C); 28 °F (−2 °C)	46 °F (8 °C); 29 °F (−2 °C)	53 °F (12 °C); 35 °F (2 °C)	61 °F (16 °C); 44 °F (7 °C)	70 °F (21 °C); 53 °F (12 °C)	79 °F (26 °C); 63 °F (17 °C)	84 °F (29 °C); 68 °F (20 °C)	82 °F (28 °C); 67 °F (19 °C)	77 °F (25 °C); 60 °F (16 °C)	68 °F (20 °C); 51 °F (11 °C)	58 °F (14 °C); 39 °F (4 °C)	49 °F (9 °C); 32 °F (0 °C)
Waldorf	44 °F (7 °C); 26 °F (−3 °C)	49 °F (9 °C); 28 °F (−2 °C)	58 °F (14 °C); 35 °F (2 °C)	68 °F (20 °C); 43 °F (6 °C)	75 °F (24 °C); 53 °F (12 °C)	81 °F (27 °C); 62 °F (17 °C)	85 °F (29 °C); 67 °F (19 °C)	83 °F (28 °C); 65 °F (18 °C)	78 °F (26 °C); 59 °F (15 °C)	68 °F (20 °C); 47 °F (8 °C)	59 °F (15 °C); 38 °F (3 °C)	48 °F (9 °C); 30 °F (−1 °C)
Point Lookout State Park	47 °F (8 °C); 29 °F (−2 °C)	51 °F (11 °C); 31 °F (−1 °C)	60 °F (16 °C); 38 °F (3 °C)	70 °F (21 °C); 46 °F (8 °C)	78 °F (26 °C); 55 °F (13 °C)	86 °F (30 °C); 64 °F (18 °C)	89 °F (32 °C); 69 °F (21 °C)	87 °F (31 °C); 67 °F (19 °C)	81 °F (27 °C); 60 °F (16 °C)	71 °F (22 °C); 49 °F (9 °C)	61 °F (16 °C); 41 °F (5 °C)	50 °F (10 °C); 32 °F (0 °C)

=== Cities and metro areas ===
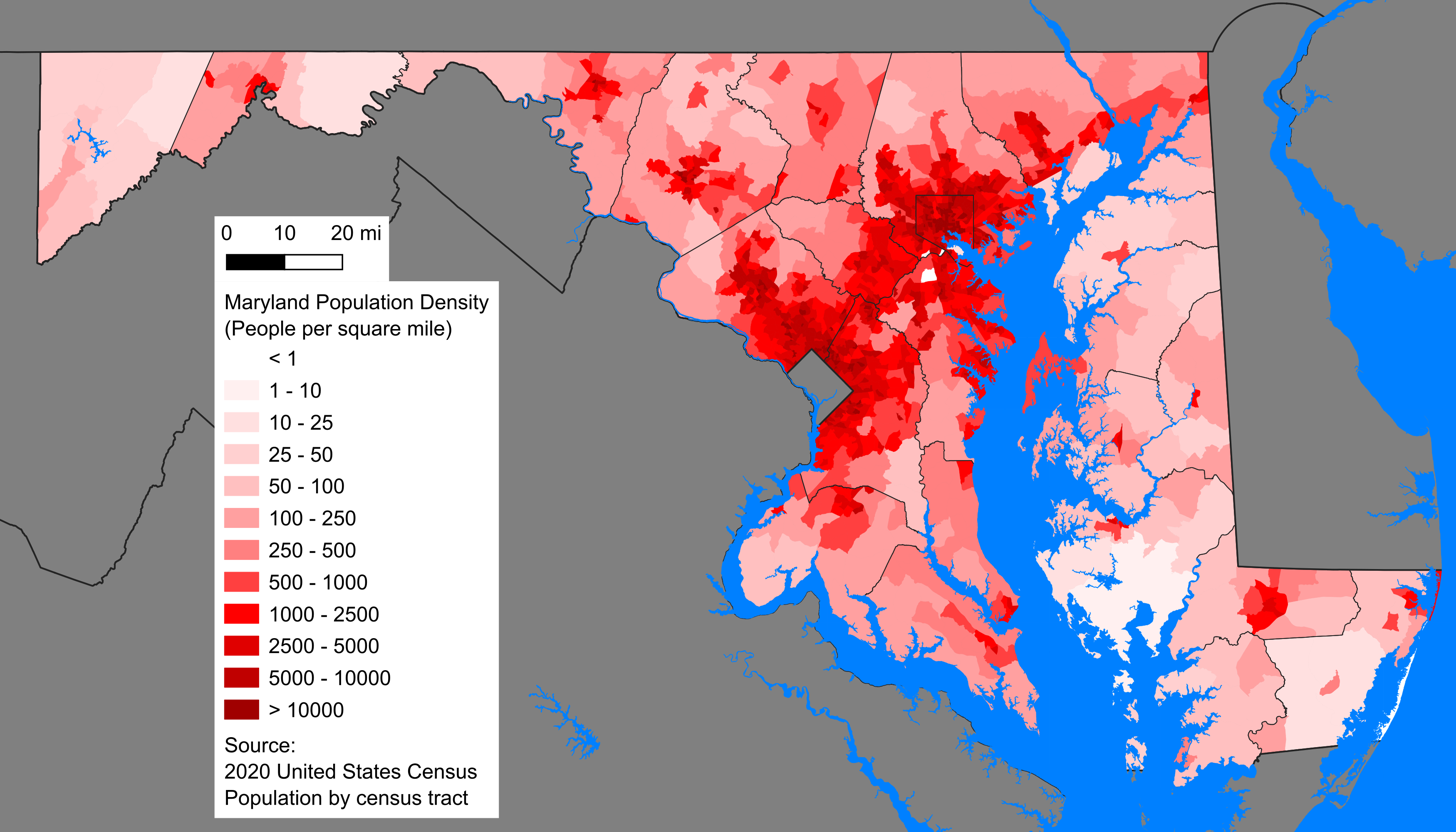
Maryland population distribution map; Maryland's population is concentrated mostly in the Washington–Baltimore combined statistical area.

Most of the population of Maryland lives in the central region of the state, in the Baltimore metropolitan area and Washington metropolitan area, both of which are part of the Baltimore–Washington metropolitan area. The majority of Maryland's population is concentrated in the cities and suburbs surrounding Washington, D.C., and in and around Baltimore, Maryland's most populous city. Historically, these and many other Maryland cities developed along the Fall Line, the line along which rivers, brooks, and streams are interrupted by rapids and waterfalls. Maryland's capital city, Annapolis, is one exception to this pattern since it lies along the banks of the Severn River, close to where it empties into the Chesapeake Bay.

The Eastern Shore is less populous and more rural, as are the counties of western Maryland. The two westernmost counties of Maryland, Allegany and Garrett, are mountainous and sparsely populated, resembling West Virginia and Appalachia more than they do the rest of the state. Both eastern and western Maryland are, however, dotted with cities of regional importance, such as Ocean City, Princess Anne, and Salisbury on the Eastern Shore and Cumberland, Frostburg, and Hancock in Western Maryland. Southern Maryland is still somewhat rural, but suburbanization from Washington, D.C., has encroached significantly since the 1960s; important local population centers include Lexington Park, Prince Frederick, California, and Waldorf.

Largest cities or towns in Maryland 2020 U.S. census populations
Rank	Name	County	Pop.
1	Baltimore	Independent city	585,708
2	Columbia	Howard	104,681
3	Germantown	Montgomery	91,249
4	Waldorf	Charles	81,410
5	Silver Spring	Montgomery	81,015
6	Frederick	Frederick	78,171
7	Ellicott City	Howard	75,947
8	Glen Burnie	Anne Arundel	72,891
9	Gaithersburg	Montgomery	69,657
10	Bethesda	Montgomery	68,056

== Demographics ==
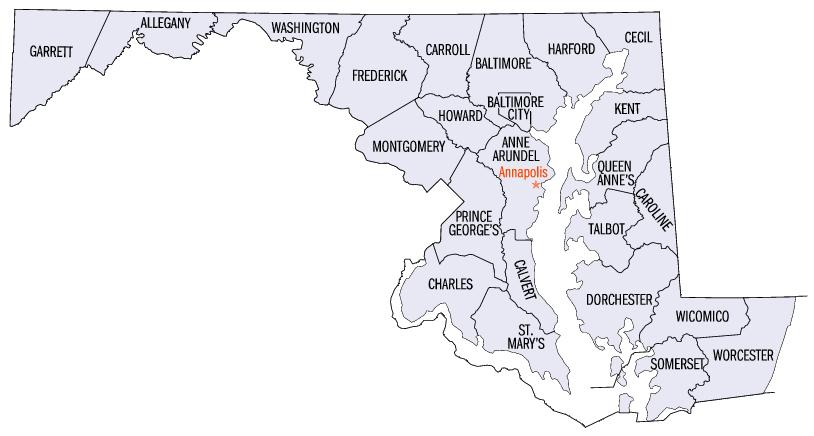
Maryland's counties

Historical population
Census	Pop.	Note	%±
1790	319,728		—
1800	341,548		6.8%
1810	380,546		11.4%
1820	407,350		7.0%
1830	447,040		9.7%
1840	470,019		5.1%
1850	583,034		24.0%
1860	687,049		17.8%
1870	780,894		13.7%
1880	934,943		19.7%
1890	1,042,390		11.5%
1900	1,188,044		14.0%
1910	1,295,346		9.0%
1920	1,449,661		11.9%
1930	1,631,526		12.5%
1940	1,821,244		11.6%
1950	2,343,001		28.6%
1960	3,100,689		32.3%
1970	3,922,399		26.5%
1980	4,216,975		7.5%
1990	4,781,468		13.4%
2000	5,296,486		10.8%
2010	5,773,552		9.0%
2020	6,177,224		7.0%
2025 (est.)	6,265,347		1.4%
Source: 1910–2020

In the 2020 United States census, the United States Census Bureau found that population of Maryland was 6,185,278 people, a 7.1% increase from the 2010 United States census. The United States Census Bureau estimated that the population of Maryland was 6,045,680 on July 1, 2019, a 4.71% increase from the 2010 United States census and an increase of 2,962, from the prior year. This includes a natural increase since the last census of 269,166 (464,251 births minus 275,093 deaths) and an increase due to net migration of 116,713 people into the state. Immigration from outside the United States resulted in a net increase of 129,730 people, and migration within the country produced a net loss of 13,017 people. In 2018, The top countries of origin for Maryland's immigrants were El Salvador (11%), India (6%), China (5%), Nigeria (5%), and the Philippines (4%). The center of population of Maryland is located on the county line between Anne Arundel County and Howard County, in the unincorporated community of Jessup.

Maryland's history as a border state has led it to exhibit characteristics of both the Northern and the Southern regions of the United States. Generally, rural Western Maryland between the West Virginian Panhandle and Pennsylvania has an Appalachian culture; the Southern and Eastern Shore regions of Maryland embody a Southern culture, while densely populated Central Maryland – radiating outward from Baltimore and Washington, D.C. – has more in common with that of the Northeast. The U.S. Census Bureau designates Maryland as one of the South Atlantic States, but it is commonly associated with the Mid-Atlantic States by other federal agencies, the media, and some residents.

According to HUD's 2022 Annual Homeless Assessment Report, there were an estimated 5,349 homeless people in Maryland.

Note: Births in the table do not add up because Hispanics are counted both by their ethnicity and by their race, giving a higher overall number.

Live births by single race/ethnicity of mother
Race	2014	2015	2016	2017	2018	2019	2020	2021	2022	2023	2024
White	33,178 (44.9%)	32,412 (44.0%)	31,278 (42.8%)	29,809 (41.6%)	29,585 (41.6%)	28,846 (41.1%)	28,060 (40.9%)	28,193 (41.3%)	27,333 (39.7%)	25,746 (39.3%)	25,368 (38.6%)
Black	25,339 (34.3%)	25,017 (34.0%)	22,829 (31.2%)	22,327 (31.1%)	21,893 (30.8%)	21,494 (30.6%)	20,869 (30.4%)	20,449 (29.9%)	20,438 (29.7%)	18,939 (28.9%)	18,330 (27.8%)
Asian	5,797 (7.8%)	5,849 (7.9%)	5,282 (7.2%)	5,276 (7.3%)	4,928 (6.9%)	4,928 (7.0%)	4,595 (6.7%)	4,431 (6.5%)	4,480 (6.5%)	4,262 (6.5%)	4,469 (6.8%)
American Indian	260 (0.3%)	279 (0.4%)	104 (0.1%)	127 (0.2%)	114 (0.2%)	113 (0.2%)	79 (0.1%)	83 (0.1%)	77 (0.1%)	75 (0.1%)	79 (0.1%)
Hispanic (any race)	10,974 (14.8%)	11,750 (16.0%)	11,872 (16.2%)	12,223 (17.1%)	12,470 (17.5%)	12,872 (18.3%)	13,034 (19.0%)	13,164 (19.3%)	14,398 (20.9%)	14,442 (22.0%)	15,174 (23.1%)
Total	73,921 (100%)	73,616 (100%)	73,136 (100%)	71,641 (100%)	71,080 (100%)	70,178 (100%)	68,554 (100%)	68,285 (100%)	68,782 (100%)	65,594 (100%)	65,797 (100%)

Since 2016, data for births of White Hispanic origin are not collected, but included in one Hispanic group; persons of Hispanic origin may be of any race.

Country of birth (2022)
Birthplace	Population
United States	4,999,873
El Salvador	105,778
India	60,535
China	43,499
Nigeria	39,185
Guatemala	38,222
Philippines	37,020
South Korea	34,091
Mexico	33,833
Ethiopia	28,554
Jamaica	26,068
Honduras	21,991
Cameroon	19,934
Vietnam	19,082
Peru	17,414
Haiti	17,000
Pakistan	16,386
Ghana	14,722
Dominican Republic	13,880
Nepal	8,646-25,000 (Note: As of 2022–2023, there were only 8,646 Nepali immigrants in Maryland; however, numerous sources cite the number of Nepali or Nepali-Bhutanese immigrants and refugees in Maryland as between 20,000 and 25,000, considering that the community has often been undercounted.)

=== Language and ancestry ===
As of 2016, the most spoken languages in Maryland other than English were Spanish (9%), Chinese (1.2%), West African languages (mostly Yoruba and Igbo, 1%), French (1%), Korean (0.7%), Afro-Asiatic languages (mostly Amharic, 0.6% and Arabic, 0.4%), and Tagalog (0.6%). Other languages with a large number of speakers in Maryland include Vietnamese (0.4%), Russian (0.4%), Hindi (0.3%), Urdu (0.3%), Persian (0.3%), Nepali (0.3%), Haitian Creole (0.2%), and Telugu (0.2%).

Racial breakdown of Maryland population
Racial composition	1970	1990	2000	2010	2020
White	81.5%	71.0%	64.0%	60.8%	58.5%
Black	17.8%	24.9%	27.9%	29.8%	31.1%
Asian	0.5%	2.9%	4.0%	5.5%	6.7%
Native American	0.1%	0.3%	0.3%	0.3%	0.6%
Other race	0.1%	0.9%	1.8%	3.6%	–
Two or more races	–	–	2.0%	2.9%	2.9%
Non-Hispanic whites	80.4%	69.6%	62.1%	54.7%	50.0%

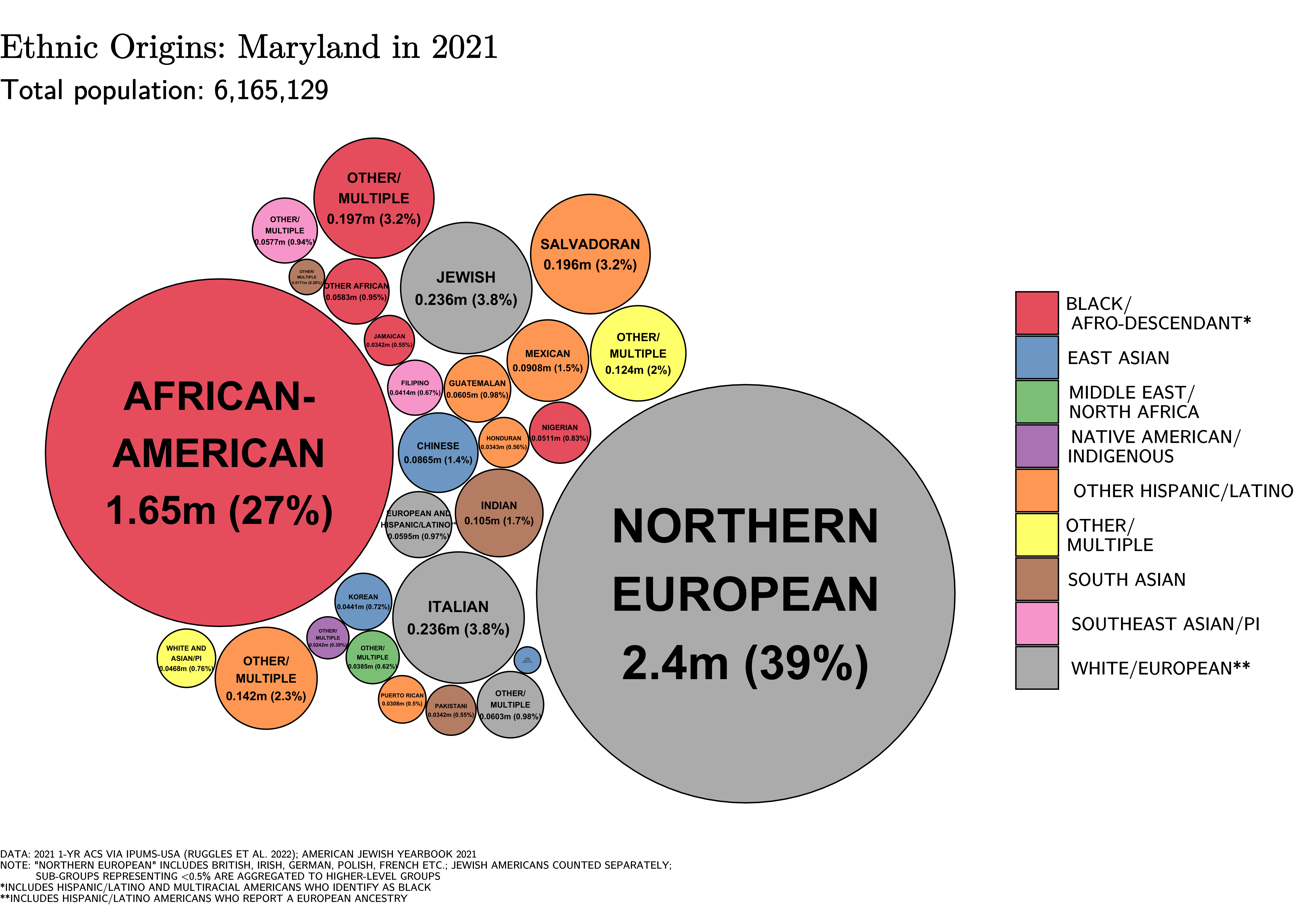
Ethnic origins in Maryland

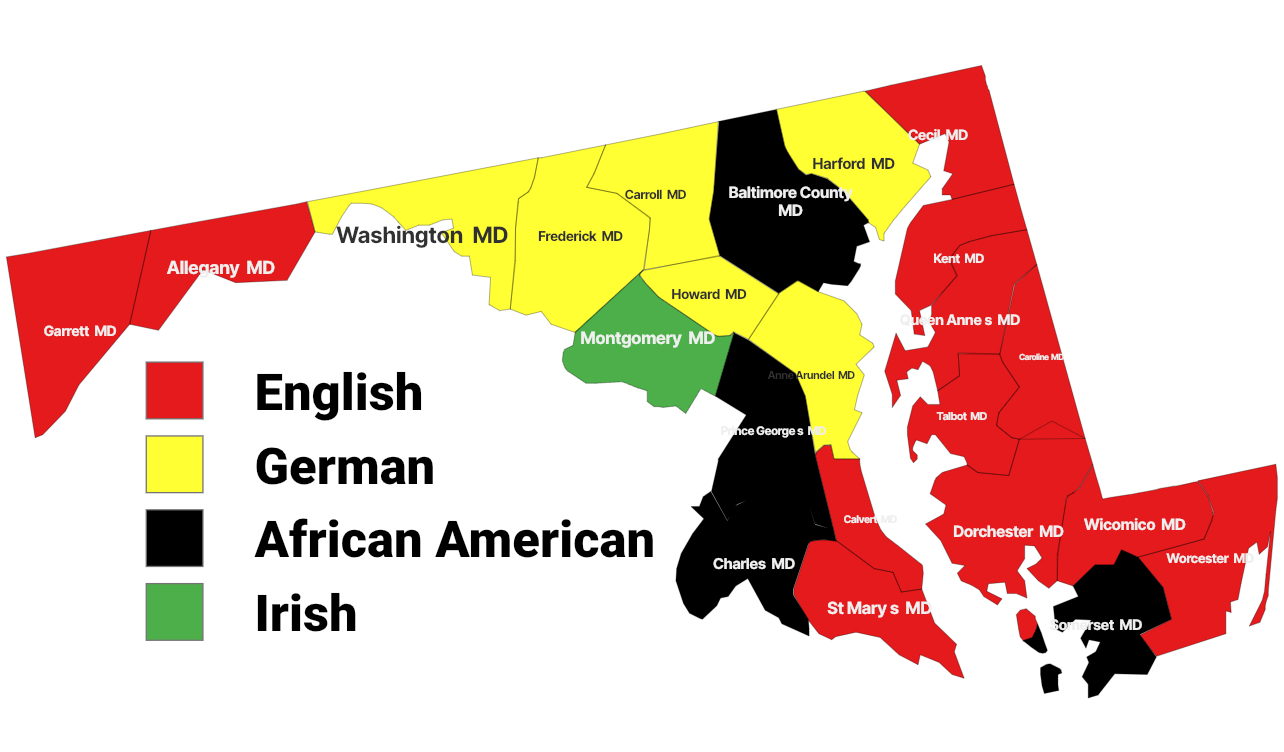
Largest alone or in any combination ethnic origin by county in Maryland, per the 2020 census

Map of counties in Maryland by racial plurality, according to 2020 U.S. census findings: Non-Hispanic White 40–50% 50–60% 60–70% 70–80% 80–90% 90%+ / Black or African American 50–60% 60–70%

In 1970, the U.S. Census Bureau reported Maryland's population as 17.8 percent African-American and 80.4 percent non-Hispanic White.

=== Racial and ethnic composition ===
Maryland – Racial and ethnic composition Note: the US Census treats Hispanic/Latino as an ethnic category. This table excludes Latinos from the racial categories and assigns them to a separate category. Hispanics/Latinos may be of any race.
Race / Ethnicity (NH = Non-Hispanic)	Pop 1980	Pop 1990	Pop 2000	Pop 2010	Pop 2020	% 1980	% 1990	% 2000	% 2010	% 2020
White alone (NH)	3,116,160	3,326,109	3,286,547	3,157,958	2,913,782	73.90%	69.56%	62.05%	54.70%	47.17%
Black or African American alone (NH)	950,464	1,177,823	1,464,735	1,674,229	1,795,027	22.54%	24.63%	27.65%	29.00%	29.06%
Native American or Alaska Native alone (NH)	8,021	12,143	13,312	13,815	12,055	0.19%	0.25%	0.25%	0.24%	0.20%
Asian alone (NH)	64,277	136,619	209,738	316,694	417,962	1.52%	2.86%	3.96%	5.49%	6.77%
Native Hawaiian or Pacific Islander alone (NH)	x	x	1,913	2,412	2,575	x	x	0.04%	0.04%	0.04%
Other race alone (NH)	13,307	3,672	9,379	11,972	35,314	0.32%	0.08%	0.18%	0.21%	0.57%
Mixed race or Multiracial (NH)	x	x	82,946	125,840	270,764	x	x	1.57%	2.18%	4.38%
Hispanic or Latino (any race)	64,746	125,102	227,916	470,632	729,745	1.54%	2.62%	4.30%	8.15%	11.81%
Total	4,216,975	4,781,468	5,296,486	5,773,552	6,177,224	100.00%	100.00%	100.00%	100.00%	100.00%

==== 2025 American Community Survey one-year estimates ====
Racial Makeup of Maryland (2025): 1. White alone (45.8%); 2. Black alone (29.2%); 3. Native American alone (0.56%); 4. Asian Alone (7.34%); 5. Pacific Islander Alone (0.03%); 6. Other race alone (7.54%); 7. Two or more races (9.54%)	Racial/Ethnic Makeup of Maryland excluding Hispanics from racial categories (2025); NH=Non-Hispanic: 1. White NH (44.2%); 2. Black NH (28.8%); 3. Native American NH (0.19%); 4. Asian NH (7.28%); 5. Pacific Islander NH (0.03%); 6. Other race NH (0.67%); 7. Two or more races NH (5.10%); 8. Hispanic Any Race (13.7%)	Racial Makeup of Hispanics in Maryland (2025): 1. White alone (11.7%); 2. Black alone (2.71%); 3. Native American alone (2.75%); 4. Asian Alone (0.42%); 5. Pacific Islander Alone (0.00%); 6. Other race alone (50.1%); 7. Two or more races (32.3%)

In 2019, non-Hispanic white Americans were 49.8% of Maryland's population (White Americans, including White Hispanics, were 57.3%), which made Maryland a majority minority state. 50.2% of Maryland's population is non-white, or is Hispanic or Latino, the highest percentage of any state on the East Coast, and the highest percentage after the majority-minority states of Hawaii, New Mexico, Texas, California, Nevada, and Washington, D.C. By 2031, minorities are projected to become the majority of voting eligible residents of Maryland. Maryland's multiculturalism and diversity can be explained by its historically large African American population, and immigration brought by the importance of the D.C. and Baltimore areas, especially from Central America, Africa, the Caribbean, and Asia.

African Americans form a sizable portion of the state's population, 31.1% as of 2020. Most are descendants of people transported to the area as slaves from West Africa. Concentrations of African Americans live in Baltimore City, Prince George's County, Charles County, western parts of Baltimore County, and the southern Eastern Shore. Charles County and Prince George's County are the two counties where African Americans are the most successful monetarily in the country, with average household incomes much higher than in the rest of the country. As a former slave state, Maryland has had a large African-American population for much of its history; African American populations have increased over time with the Great Migration to the D.C. and Baltimore areas, and in more recent times with the New Great Migration and with movement out from Washington D.C. into Montgomery, Prince George's, and Charles counties, as a result of gentrification and rising housing costs in D.C. causing many African Americans to leave. Prince George's County in particular has been a magnet for African Americans from D.C. to move to for decades; it is often referred to as "Ward 9" of D.C.

Maryland has by far the highest percentage of residents born in Africa out of any state; residents of African descent include 20th-century and later immigrants from Nigeria, particularly of the Igbo and Yoruba tribes; Ethiopia, particularly Amharas with significant Oromo and Tigrayan populations; Cameroon, Ghana, Sierra Leone, and Kenya. Maryland also hosts populations from other African and Caribbean nations. Maryland's African immigrant population is generally well-educated and is most concentrated in the inner suburbs of Baltimore and D.C. Nigerians are the fourth-largest immigrant group in Maryland, and are largely concentrated in the Baltimore area and surrounding suburbs, as well as Prince George's county. Many immigrants from the Horn of Africa, especially Ethiopia, have settled in Maryland, with large communities in the suburbs of Washington, D.C., particularly in Montgomery and Prince George's counties. The Washington metropolitan area has the world's largest population of Ethiopians outside of Ethiopia. The Ethiopian community of Greater D.C. was historically based in the Adams Morgan and Shaw neighborhoods of Washington, D.C., but as the community has grown, many Ethiopians have settled in Silver Spring. The Ethiopian American population in Maryland and the rest of the D.C. area is largely Amharic-speaking, but there are significant numbers of speakers of Oromo and Tigrinya speakers as well. The Washington metropolitan area is also home to a large Eritrean community.

The top reported ancestries by Maryland residents are: German (15%), Irish (11%), English (8%), American (7%), Italian (6%), and Polish (3%).

Irish American populations can be found throughout the Baltimore area, and the Northern and Eastern suburbs of Washington, D.C., in Maryland, who were descendants of those who moved out to the suburbs of Washington, D.C.'s once predominantly Irish neighborhoods), as well as Western Maryland, where Irish immigrant laborers helped to build the B&O Railroad. Smaller but much older Irish populations can be found in Southern Maryland, with some roots dating as far back as the early Maryland colony. This population, however, still remains culturally very active and yearly festivals are held.

More recent European immigrants of the late 19th and early 20th century settled first in Baltimore, attracted to its industrial jobs. These groups were largely of Jewish, Italian, Greek, Polish, Czech, Lithuanian, Russian and Ukrainian descent. The Greek community includes a number of Greek Jews.

The shares of European immigrants born in Eastern Europe increased significantly between 1990 and 2010. Following the dissolution of the Soviet Union, Yugoslavia, and Czechoslovakia, many immigrants from Eastern Europe came to the United States—12 percent of whom currently reside in Maryland.

Hispanic immigrants of the later 20th century have settled in Aspen Hill, Hyattsville/Langley Park, Glenmont/Wheaton, Bladensburg, Riverdale Park, Gaithersburg, as well as Highlandtown and Greektown in East Baltimore. Maryland has the highest percentage of residents of Central American origin of any state. Salvadorans are the largest Hispanic group in Maryland, and Maryland has the largest percentage of Salvadoran residents of any state. The D.C. area also has the highest percentage of Salvadorans of any American metro area, who are particularly concentrated in Prince George's and Montgomery counties, and has the second-highest total number of Salvadorans after the Los Angeles area. Other Hispanic groups with significant populations in the state include Mexicans, Guatemalans, Hondurans, Dominicans, Peruvians, and Puerto Ricans, along with growing populations of Brazilians, Colombians, Ecuadorians, and Bolivians. Maryland's Hispanic population is especially concentrated in Montgomery County and Prince George's County, with other large populations in the Baltimore area and Frederick County. Maryland has one of the most diverse Hispanic populations in the country, with significant populations from various Caribbean and Central American nations.

Caribbean Americans have a significant presence in Maryland, especially Jamaican Americans, who make up 0.6% of the population and have had a significant presence and influence in Maryland's politics and culture; Maryland's current governor, Wes Moore, is the son of a Jamaican immigrant mother. Other Caribbean American nationalities with a large population in Maryland include Dominicans, Haitians, Trinidadians and Tobagonians, and Guyanese. Caribbean Americans are most concentrated in Prince George's County, the city of Baltimore, Baltimore County, and Montgomery County. Maryland is home to nearly 17,000 Haitians, according to 2023 Census Bureau data. Roughly 4,200 live in Wicomico County, Maryland, which includes Salisbury. Trinidadians and Tobagonians are concentrated in Baltimore City, Baltimore County, and Prince George's County. There are growing Caribbean populations in Columbia and Waldorf.

Asian Americans are concentrated in the suburban counties surrounding Washington, D.C., and in Baltimore suburbs, especially Howard County, with Chinese American, Korean American and Taiwanese American communities in Rockville, Gaithersburg, and Germantown. Chinese in particular form the second-largest group of Asian Americans, and are the largest group in Montgomery County. Maryland also has a large Korean American population, especially in Howard County, where there is a Koreatown in Ellicott City. Filipino Americans, the largest group of Southeast Asians, form major communities in Montgomery, Prince George's, and Charles counties; other large groups of Southeast Asians include Vietnamese, who are concentrated in Montgomery County, and Burmese, who are concentrated in Frederick, Howard, and Baltimore Counties. Maryland has a very large and diverse South Asian American population that has had a major presence in the state since the 1970s. Indian Americans are the largest Asian group in Maryland, making up 1.7 percent of the population, and live throughout the state, especially in Montgomery and Howard counties, with large numbers in Baltimore, Frederick, and Prince George's counties. The Indian American population is culturally and linguistically diverse, with the Indian languages spoken most being Hindi, Gujarati, Telugu, and Tamil. There are also large Pakistani American populations throughout the D.C. and Baltimore areas, especially in Baltimore County and Howard County, and a large Bangladeshi American community in the D.C. area. Maryland has one of the largest populations of Nepali Americans, including Bhutanese Americans of Nepali descent, in the U.S., many of whom are recent immigrants or refugees who sought asylum after expulsion from Bhutan or the 2015 Nepal earthquake; there are an estimated 20,000 to 25,000 Nepalis in Maryland, concentrated in the Baltimore area with significant populations in the D.C. area. The first Nepali American elected to a state legislature, Harry Bhandari, was elected in Maryland, representing part of Baltimore County. There are three state-recognized tribes, and in 2020, 31,845 identified as being Native American alone, and 96,805 did in combination with one or more other races.

Attracting educated Asians and Africans to the professional jobs in the region, Maryland has the fifth-largest proportions of racial minorities in the country.

In 2006, 645,744 were counted as foreign born, which represents mainly people from Latin America and Asia. About four percent are undocumented immigrants.

According to The Williams Institute's analysis of the 2010 U.S. census, 12,538 same-sex couples are living in Maryland, representing 5.8 same-sex couples per 1,000 households.

Romani people are present in Maryland.

=== Religion ===
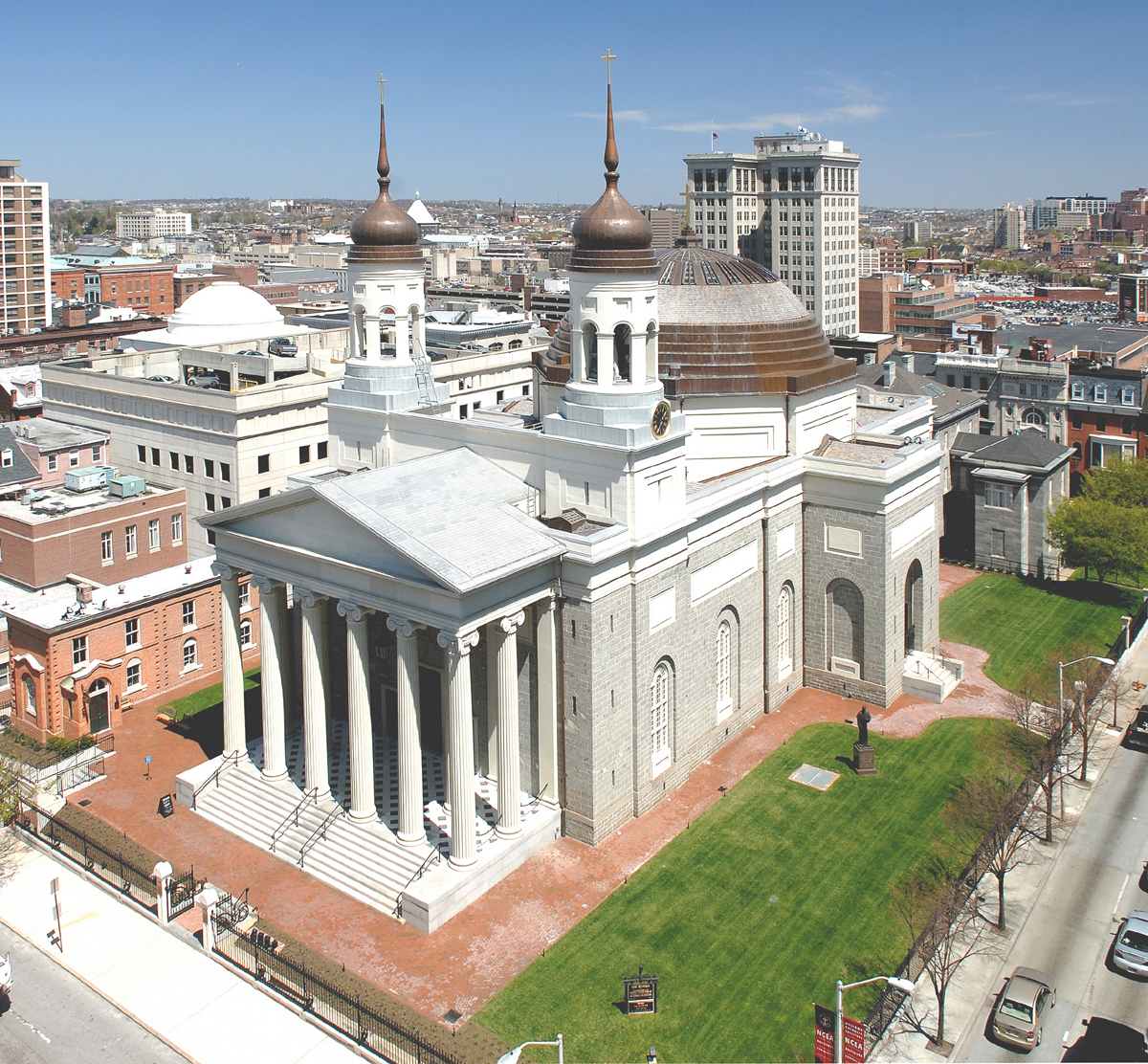
Baltimore Basilica, the first Catholic cathedral built in the U.S.

Religion in Maryland (2014)
Religion	Percent
Protestant	52%
None	23%
Catholic	15%
Jewish	3%
Other faiths	2%
Buddhist	1%
Hindu	1%
Islam	1%
Mormon	1%
Orthodox Christian	1%

Maryland has been historically prominent to American Catholic tradition because the English colony of Maryland was intended by George Calvert as a haven for English Catholics. Baltimore was the seat of the first Catholic bishop in the U.S. (1789), and Emmitsburg was the home and burial place of the first American-born citizen to be canonized, St. Elizabeth Ann Seton. Georgetown University, the first Catholic university, was founded in 1789 in what was then part of Maryland; it became a part of the District of Columbia when it was created in the 1790s. The Basilica of the National Shrine of the Assumption of the Virgin Mary in Baltimore was the first Roman Catholic cathedral built in the United States, and the Archbishop of Baltimore is, albeit without formal primacy, the United States' quasi-primate, and often a cardinal. Among the immigrants of the 19th and 20th centuries from eastern and southern Europe were many Catholics.

Despite its historic relevance to the Catholic Church in the United States, the percentage of Catholics in the state of Maryland is below the national average of 20%. Demographically, both Protestants and those identifying with no religion are more numerous than Catholics.

According to the Pew Research Center in 2014, 69 percent of Maryland's population identifies themselves as Christian. Nearly 52% of the adult population are Protestants. (Note: Including Evangelical Protestants (18%), Mainline Protestants (18%), and Historically Black Protestants (16%)) Following Protestantism, Catholicism is the second-largest religious affiliation, comprising 15% percent of the population. Amish/Mennonite communities are found in St. Mary's, Garrett, and Cecil counties. Judaism is the largest non-Christian religion in Maryland, with 241,000 adherents, or four percent of the total population. Jews are numerous throughout Montgomery County and in Pikesville and Owings Mills northwest of Baltimore. An estimated 81,500 Jewish Americans live in Montgomery County, constituting approximately 10% of the total population. The Seventh-day Adventist Church's world headquarters and Ahmadiyya Muslims' national headquarters are located in Silver Spring, just outside Washington, D.C.

Per the Public Religion Research Institute in 2020, 61 percent of Maryland's population identified with Christianity. Protestantism and Roman Catholicism continued to dominate the Christian landscape, and the Jewish community remained at 3% of the total religious population. Of the unaffiliated, the PRRI study determined their increase to 28% of the population.

=== LGBT population ===
In 2023, the Williams Institute found 5.4% of Marylanders identify as lesbian, gay, bisexual, or transgender, 0.1% below the national average. Maryland ranks as one of the best states in the nation for rights of the LGBT community, with protections against discrimination enacted since 2001 for sexuality and 2014 for gender, same-sex marriage legalization in 2013, bans on conversion therapy enacted in 2018, abolition of the gay panic defense in 2021, and issuance in 2023 of an executive order protecting the rights of transgender individuals. In 2020, Montgomery County unanimously passed an ordinance implementing an LGBTIQ+ bill of rights.

The first person known to describe himself as a drag queen was William Dorsey Swann, born enslaved in Hancock, Maryland. Swann was the first American on record who pursued legal and political action to defend the LGBTQ community's right to assemble.

In February 2010, Attorney General Doug Gansler issued an opinion stating that Maryland law should honor same-sex marriages from out of state. At the time, the state Supreme Court wrote a decision upholding marriage discrimination.

On March 1, 2012, Maryland Governor Martin O'Malley signed the freedom to marry bill into law after it passed in the state legislature. Opponents of same-sex marriage began collecting signatures to overturn the law, which faced a referendum, as Question 6, in the November 2012 election. A January 2011 Gonzales Research & Marketing Strategies poll showed 51% support for marriage in the state.

In May 2012, Maryland's Court of Appeals ruled that the state will recognize marriages of same-sex couples who married out-of-state, no matter the outcome of the November election. Voters upheld the bill, passing Question 6 with 52% to 48% on November 6, 2012. Same-sex couples began marrying in Maryland on January 1, 2013.

== Economy ==
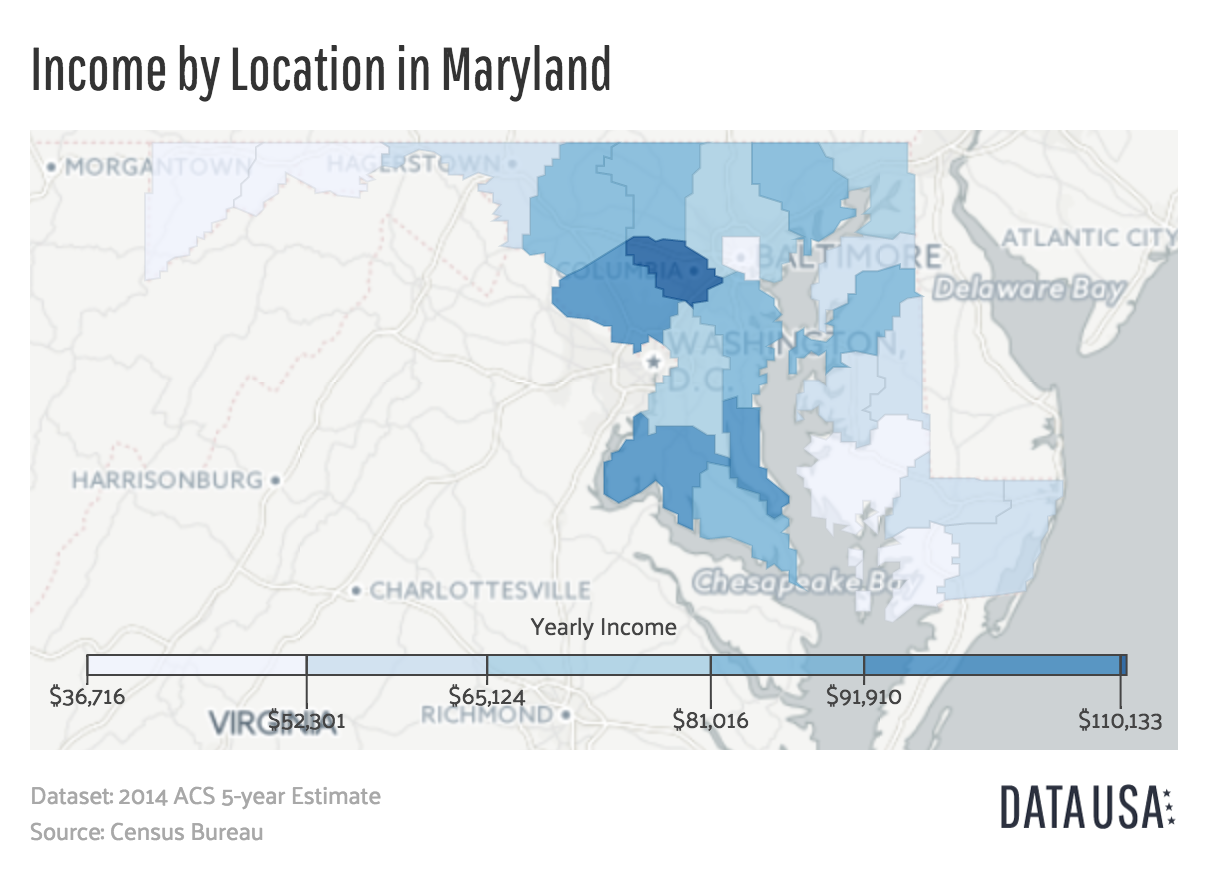
A map showing Maryland's median income by county. Data is sourced from the 2014 ACS five-year estimate report, published by the U.S. Census Bureau

The Bureau of Economic Analysis estimates that Maryland's Gross State Product in 2025 was $568.1 billion. Maryland's per capita personal income in 2025 was $81,834. However, Maryland has been using Genuine Progress Indicator, an indicator of well-being, to guide the state's development, rather than relying only on growth indicators like GDP. According to the U.S. Census Bureau, Maryland households are currently the wealthiest in the country, with a 2013 median household income of $72,483, which puts it ahead of New Jersey and Connecticut, which are second and third respectively. Two of Maryland's counties, Howard and Montgomery, are the second and eleventh wealthiest counties in the nation respectively. Montgomery County has the largest economy in Maryland by far; its Gross Domestic Product (GDP) of more than $117 billion makes up 25% of the state's total economy as of 2024. Maryland has the most millionaires per capita in 2013, with a ratio of 7.7 percent. Also, the state's poverty rate of 7.8 percent is the lowest in the country. As of March 2022, the state's unemployment rate was 4.6 percent.

Maryland's economy benefits from the state's proximity to the federal government in Washington, D.C., with an emphasis on technical and administrative tasks for the defense/aerospace industry and bio-research laboratories, as well as staffing of satellite government headquarters in the suburban or exurban Baltimore/Washington area. Ft. Meade serves as the headquarters of the Defense Information Systems Agency, United States Cyber Command, and the National Security Agency/Central Security Service. In addition, a number of educational and medical research institutions are located in the state. The various components of The Johns Hopkins University and its medical research facilities are now the largest single employer in the Baltimore area.

Manufacturing, while large in dollar value, is highly diversified with no sub-sector contributing over 20 percent of the total. Typical forms of manufacturing include electronics, computer equipment, and chemicals. The once-mighty primary metals sub-sector, which once included what was then the largest steel factory in the world at Sparrows Point, still exists, but is pressed with foreign competition, bankruptcies, and mergers. During World War II, the Glenn Martin Company (now part of Lockheed Martin) airplane factory employed some 40,000 people.

Mining other than construction materials is virtually limited to coal, which is located in the mountainous western part of the state. The brownstone quarries in the east, which gave Baltimore and Washington much of their characteristic architecture in the mid-19th century, were once a predominant natural resource. Historically, there used to be small gold-mining operations in Maryland, some near Washington, but these no longer exist.

In 2022, the top private employers by number of employees were BYK Gardner, Clean Harbors, Holy Cross Hospital, Johns Hopkins Bayview Medical Center, Johns Hopkins University Applied Physics Laboratory, Johns Hopkins University School of Medicine, Maryland Neuroimaging Center, Northrop Grumman, University of Maryland, and University of Maryland Medical Center.

In 2025, 99.6% of businesses in Maryland were small businesses, and employed 47.9% of the state's workforce.

=== Port of Baltimore ===
One major service activity is transportation, centered on the Port of Baltimore and its related rail and trucking access. The port ranked 17th in the U.S. by tonnage in 2008. Although the port handles a wide variety of products, the most typical imports are raw materials and bulk commodities, such as iron ore, petroleum, sugar, and fertilizers, often distributed to the relatively close manufacturing centers of the inland Midwest via good overland transportation. The port also receives several brands of imported motor vehicles and is the number one auto port in the U.S.

Baltimore City is among the top 15 largest ports in the nation, and was one of six major U.S. ports that were part of the February 2006 controversy over the Dubai Ports World deal. The state as a whole is heavily industrialized, with a prosperous economy and influential technology centers. Its computer industries are some of the most sophisticated in the United States, and the federal government has invested heavily in the area. Maryland is home to several large military bases and scores of high-level government jobs.

The Chesapeake and Delaware Canal is a 14 miles (23 km) canal on the Eastern Shore that connects the waters of the Delaware River with those of the Chesapeake Bay, and in particular with the Port of Baltimore, carrying 40 percent of the port's ship traffic.

=== Fishing ===
Maryland has a large food-production sector. A large component of this is commercial fishing, centered in the Chesapeake Bay, but also including activity off the short Atlantic seacoast. The largest catches by species are the blue crab, oysters, striped bass, and menhaden. The Bay also has overwintering waterfowl in its wildlife refuges. The waterfowl support a tourism sector of sportsmen.

=== Agriculture ===
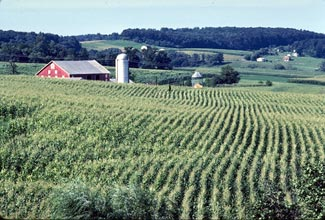
Agriculture is an important part of Maryland's economy.

Maryland has large areas of fertile agricultural land in its coastal and Piedmont zones, though this land use is being encroached upon by urbanization. Agriculture is oriented to dairy farming (especially in foothill and piedmont areas) for nearby large city milksheads, plus specialty perishable horticulture crops, such as cucumbers, watermelons, sweet corn, tomatoes, melons, squash, and peas (Source:USDA Crop Profiles). The southern counties of the western shoreline of Chesapeake Bay are warm enough to support a tobacco cash crop zone, which has existed since early Colonial times, but declined greatly after a state government buy-out in the 1990s. There is also a large automated chicken-farming sector in the state's southeastern part; Salisbury is home to Perdue Farms. Maryland's food-processing plants are the most significant type of manufacturing by value in the state. Farming suffers from weeds as anywhere else, including an unusual multiply resistant ragweed (Ambrosia artemisiifolia) found by Rousonelos et al., 2012 with both ALS- and PPO-resistances and which by 2016 had developed a third, EPSP resistance. This ragweed population is a drag on soybean cultivation and, as of May 7, 2022, is the worst multiresistant weed problem in the state.

=== Biotechnology ===
Maryland is a major center for life sciences research and development. With more than 400 biotechnology companies located there, Maryland is the fourth largest nexus in this field in the United States.

Institutions and government agencies with an interest in research and development located in Maryland include the Johns Hopkins University, the Johns Hopkins Applied Physics Laboratory, more than one campus of the University System of Maryland, Goddard Space Flight Center, the United States Census Bureau, the National Institutes of Health, the National Institute of Standards and Technology, the National Institute of Mental Health, the Walter Reed National Military Medical Center, the federal Food and Drug Administration, the Howard Hughes Medical Institute, the Celera Genomics company, the J. Craig Venter Institute, and AstraZeneca (formerly MedImmune).

Maryland is home to defense contractor Emergent BioSolutions, which manufactures and provides an anthrax vaccine to U.S. government military personnel.

=== Tourism ===
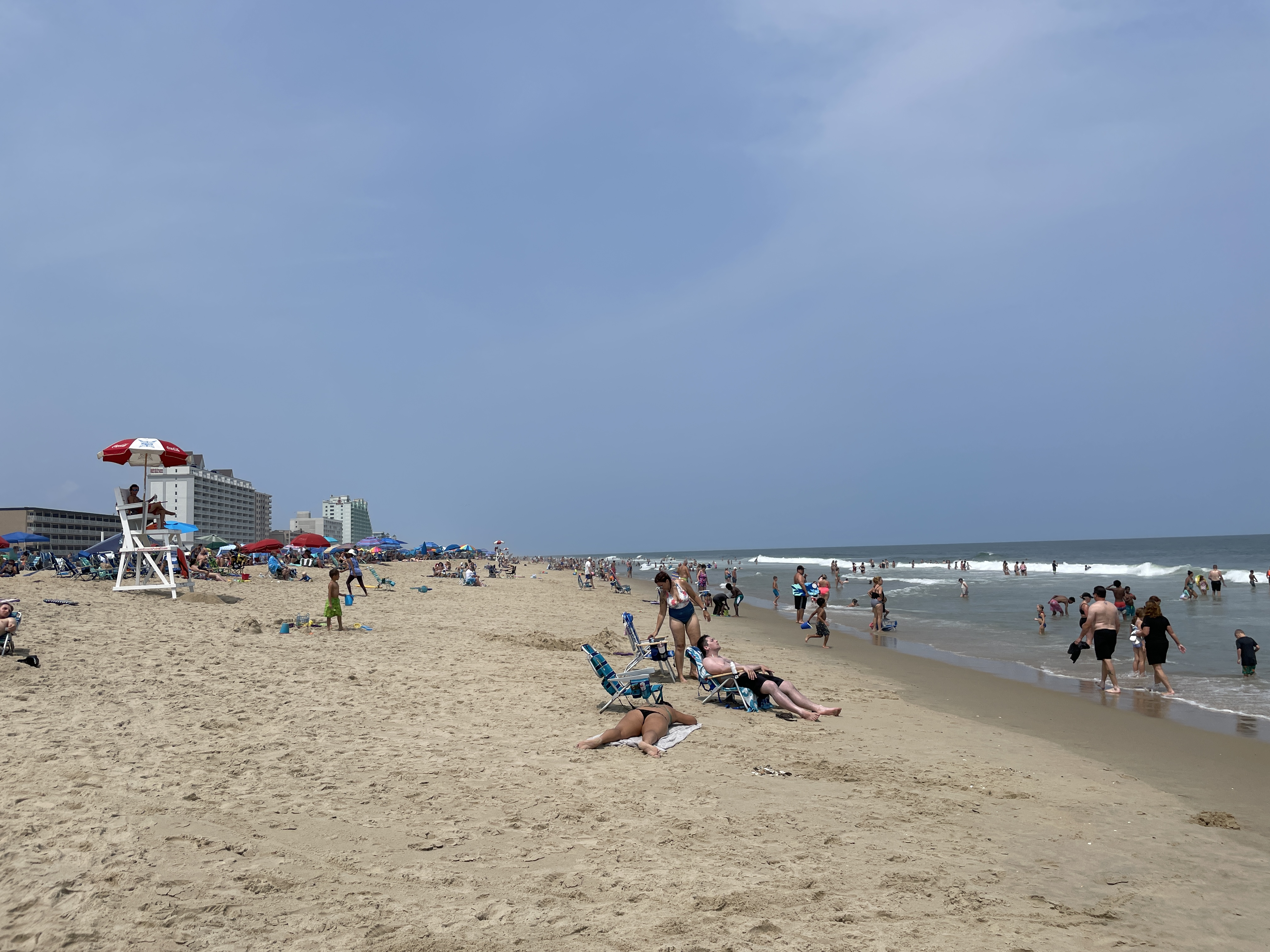
Ocean City, a beach resort along the Atlantic Ocean and a popular tourist destination in Maryland

Tourism is popular in Maryland. Many tourists visit Baltimore, the beaches of the Eastern Shore, and the nature of western Maryland. Attractions in Baltimore include the Harborplace, the Baltimore Aquarium, Fort McHenry, as well as the Camden Yards baseball stadium. Ocean City on the Atlantic Coast has been a popular beach destination in summer, particularly since the Chesapeake Bay Bridge was built in 1952 connecting the Eastern Shore to the more populated Maryland cities. The state capital of Annapolis offers sites such as the state capitol building, the historic district, and the waterfront. Maryland also has several sites of interest to military history, given Maryland's role in the American Civil War and in the War of 1812. Other attractions include the historic and picturesque towns along the Chesapeake Bay, such as Saint Mary's, Maryland's first colonial settlement and original capital.

=== Healthcare ===
As of 2017, the top two health insurers including all types of insurance were CareFirst BlueCross BlueShield with 47% market share followed by UnitedHealth Group at 15%.

Maryland has experimented with healthcare payment reforms, notably beginning in the 1970s with an all-payer rate setting program regulated by the Health Services Cost Review Commission. In 2014, it switched to a global budget revenue system, whereby hospitals receive a capitated payment to care for their population.

== Transportation ==
The Maryland Department of Transportation oversees most transportation in the state through its various administration-level agencies. The independent Maryland Transportation Authority maintains and operates the state's eight toll facilities.

=== Roads ===
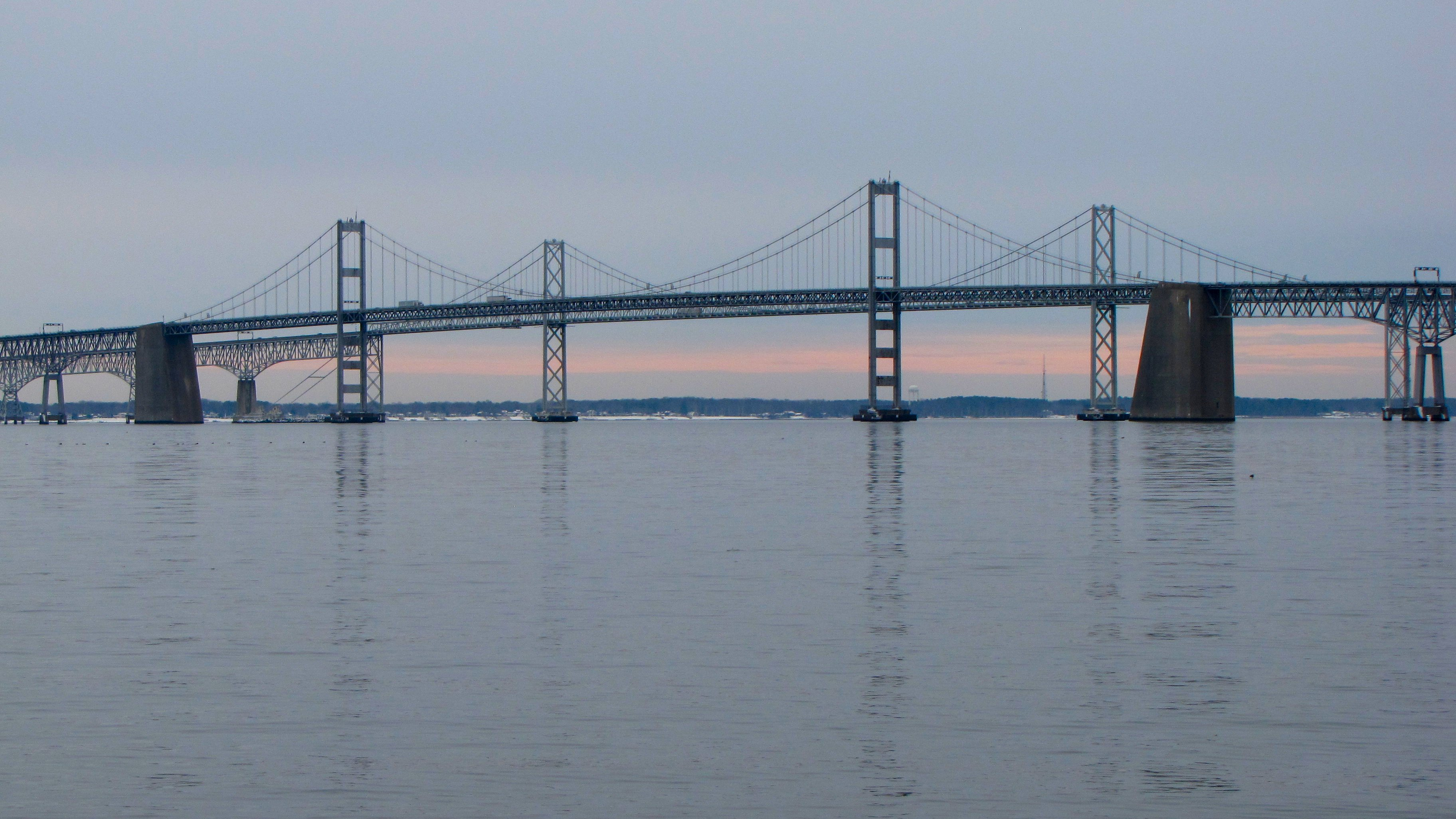
The Chesapeake Bay Bridge, which connects Maryland's Eastern and Western Shores

Maryland's Interstate highways include 110 miles (180 km) of I-95, which enters the northeast portion of the state, travels through Baltimore, and becomes part of the eastern section of the Capital Beltway to the Woodrow Wilson Bridge. I-68 travels 81 miles (130 km), connecting the western portions of the state to I-70 in the small town of Hancock. I-70 enters from Pennsylvania north of Hancock and continues east for 93 miles (150 km) to Baltimore, connecting Hagerstown and Frederick along the way.

I-83 has 34 miles (55 km) in Maryland and connects Baltimore to southern central Pennsylvania (Harrisburg and York, Pennsylvania). Maryland also has an 11-mile (18 km) portion of I-81 that travels through the state near Hagerstown. I-97, fully contained within Anne Arundel County and the shortest (17.6 miles (28.3 km)) one- or two-digit interstate highway in the contiguous US, connects the Baltimore area to the Annapolis area.

There are also several auxiliary Interstate highways in Maryland. Among them are two beltways encircling the major cities of the region: I-695, the McKeldin (Baltimore) Beltway, which encircles Baltimore; and a portion of I-495, the Capital Beltway, which encircles Washington, D.C. I-270, which connects the Frederick area with Northern Virginia and Washington, D.C. through major suburbs to the northwest of Washington, is a major commuter route and is as wide as fourteen lanes at points. I-895, also known as the Baltimore Harbor Tunnel Thruway, provides an alternate route to I-95 across Baltimore Harbor.

Both I-270 and the Capital Beltway were extremely congested; however, the Intercounty Connector has alleviated some congestion over time. Construction of the ICC was a major part of the campaign platform of former Governor Robert Ehrlich, who was in office from 2003 until 2007, and of Governor Martin O'Malley, who succeeded him. I-595, which is an unsigned highway concurrent with US 50/US 301, is the longest unsigned interstate in the country and connects Prince George's County and Washington, D.C. with Annapolis and the Eastern Shore via the Chesapeake Bay Bridge.

Maryland also has a state highway system that contains routes numbered from 2 through 999, however most of the higher-numbered routes are either unsigned or are relatively short. Major state highways include Routes 2 (Governor Ritchie Highway/Solomons Island Road/Southern Maryland Blvd.), 4 (Pennsylvania Avenue/Southern Maryland Blvd./Patuxent Beach Road/St. Andrew's Church Road), 5 (Branch Avenue/Leonardtown Road/Point Lookout Road), 32, 45 (York Road), 97 (Georgia Avenue), 100 (Paul T. Pitcher Memorial Highway), 210 (Indian Head Highway), 235 (Three Notch Road), 295 (Baltimore-Washington Parkway), 355 (Wisconsin Avenue/Rockville Pike/Frederick Road), 404 (Queen Anne Highway/ Shore Highway), and 650 (New Hampshire Avenue).

The Maryland Department of Transportation reported 480 fatalities in Maryland for 2025, the first recording below 500 since 2014.

=== Airports ===
Maryland's largest airport is Baltimore-Washington International Thurgood Marshall Airport, more commonly referred to as BWI. The airport is named for the Baltimore-born Thurgood Marshall, the first African-American Supreme Court justice. The only other airports with commercial service are at Hagerstown and Salisbury.

The Maryland suburbs of Washington, D.C. are also served by the other two airports in the region, Ronald Reagan Washington National Airport and Dulles International Airport, both in Northern Virginia. The College Park Airport is the nation's oldest, founded in 1909, and is still used. Wilbur Wright trained military aviators at this location.

=== Rail ===
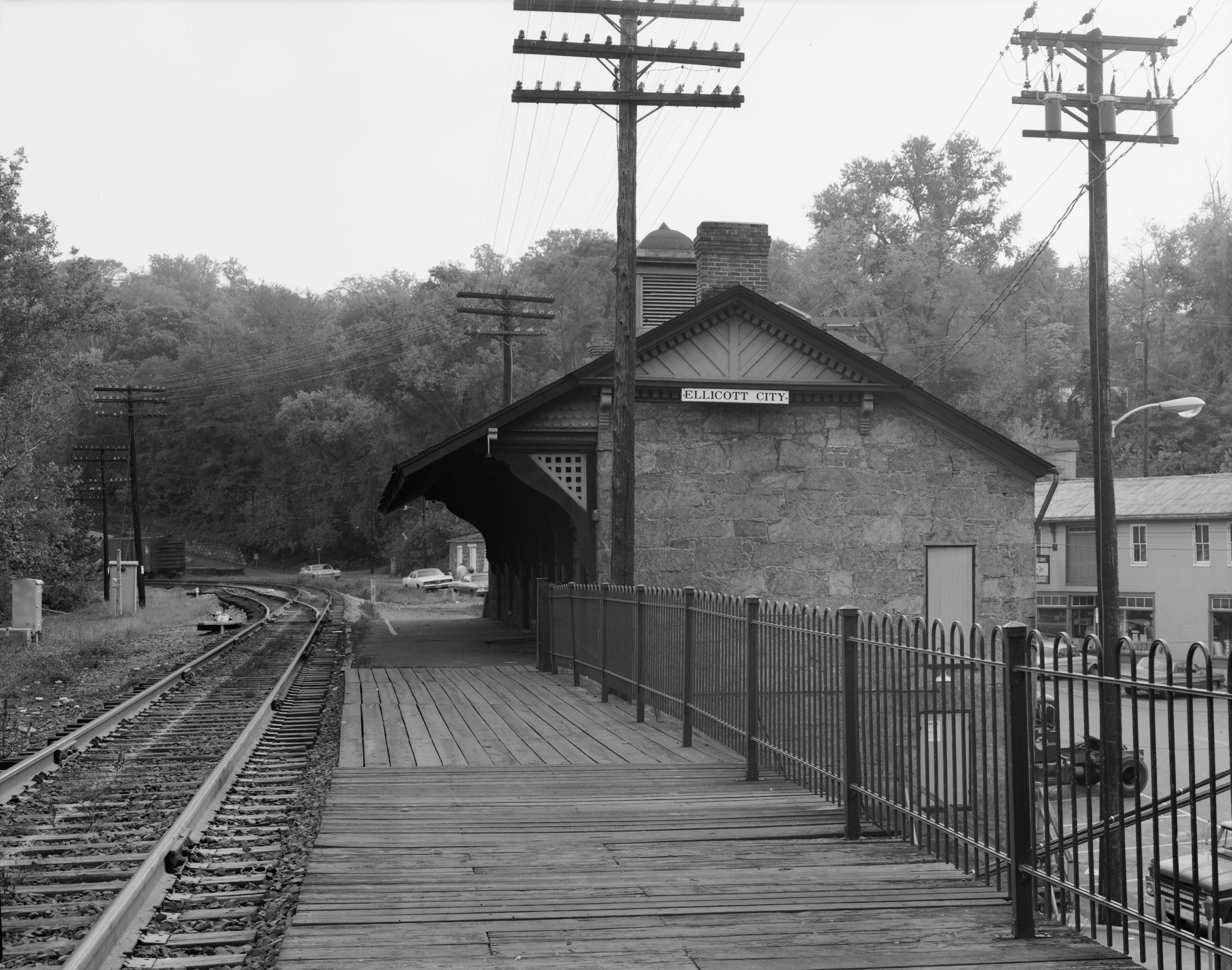
Ellicott City Station, on the original Baltimore and Ohio Railroad line, the oldest remaining passenger station in the nation. The rail line is still used by CSX Transportation for freight trains, and the station is now a museum.

Amtrak trains, including the high-speed Acela Express serve Penn Station in Baltimore, BWI Airport, New Carrollton, and Aberdeen along the Washington, D.C. to Boston Northeast Corridor. Train service is provided to Rockville and Cumberland by Amtrak's Washington, D.C., to Chicago Capitol Limited.

The WMATA's Metrorail rapid transit and Metrobus local bus systems (the 2nd and 6th busiest in the nation of their respective modes) provide service in Montgomery and Prince George's counties and connect them to Washington D.C.. The Maryland Transit Administration (often abbreviated as "MTA Maryland"), a state agency part of the Maryland Department of Transportation also provides transit services within the state. Headquartered in Baltimore, MTA's transit services are largely focused on central Maryland, as well as some portions of the Eastern Shore and Southern MD. Baltimore's Light RailLink and Metro SubwayLink systems serve its densely populated inner-city and the surrounding suburbs. The MTA also serves the city and its suburbs with its local bus service (the 9th largest system in the nation). The MTA's Commuter Bus system provides express coach service on longer routes connecting Washington, D.C. and Baltimore to parts of Central and Southern MD as well as the Eastern Shore. The commuter rail service, known as MARC, operates three lines which all terminate at Washington Union Station and provide service to Baltimore's Penn and Camden stations, Perryville, Frederick, and Martinsburg, West Virginia. In addition, many suburban counties operate local bus systems which connect to and complement the larger MTA and WMATA/Metro services.

The MTA will also administer the Purple Line, an under-construction light rail line that will connect the Maryland branches of the Red, Green/Yellow, and Orange lines of the Washington Metro, as well as offer transfers to all three lines of the MARC commuter rail system.

Freight rail transport is handled principally by two Class I railroads, as well as several smaller regional and local carriers. CSX Transportation has more extensive trackage throughout the state, with 560 miles (900 km), followed by Norfolk Southern Railway. Major rail yards are located in Baltimore and Cumberland, with an intermodal terminal (rail, truck and marine) in Baltimore.

== Law and government ==
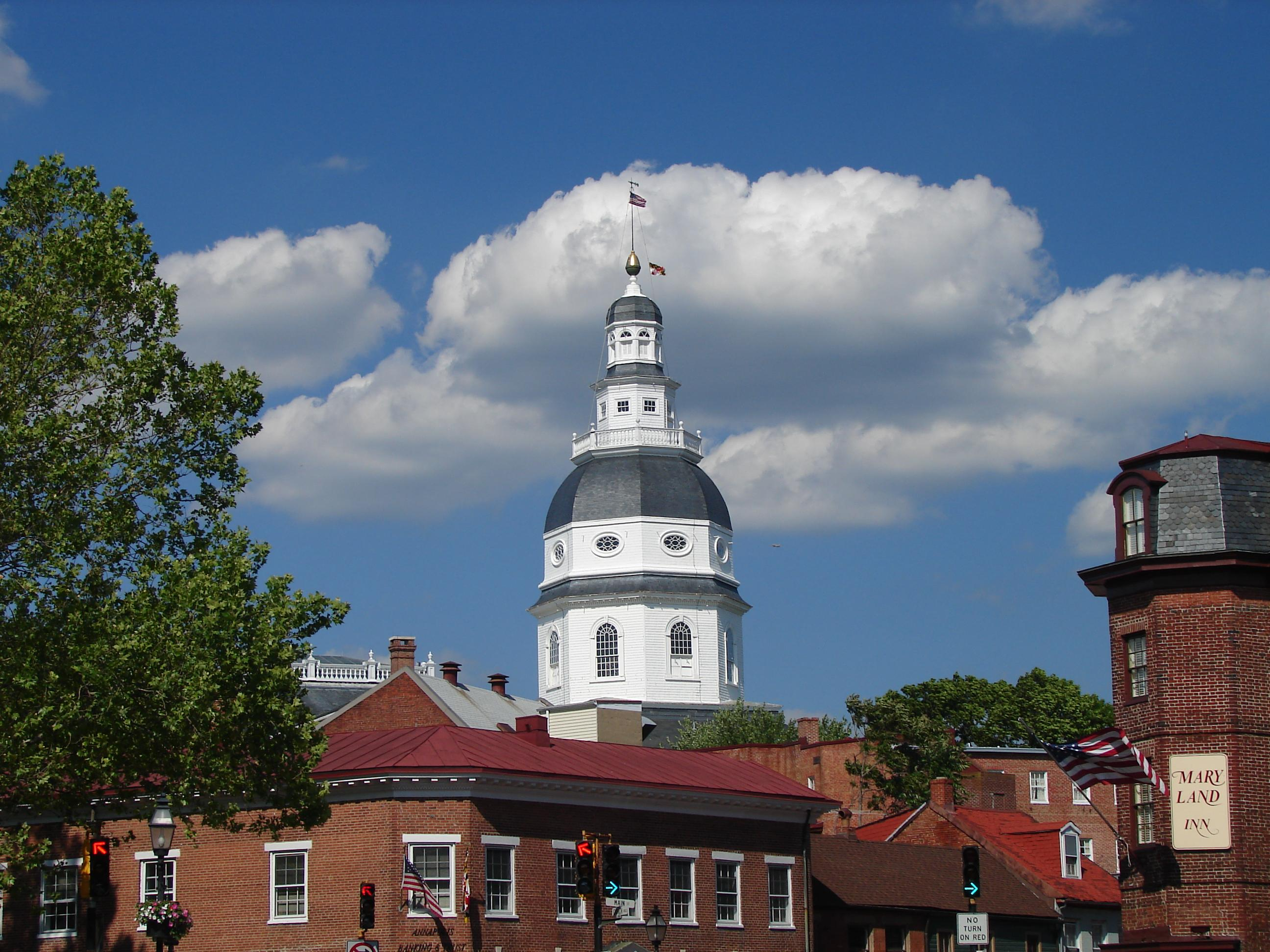
The Maryland State House in Annapolis dates to 1772, and houses the Maryland General Assembly and offices of the governor.

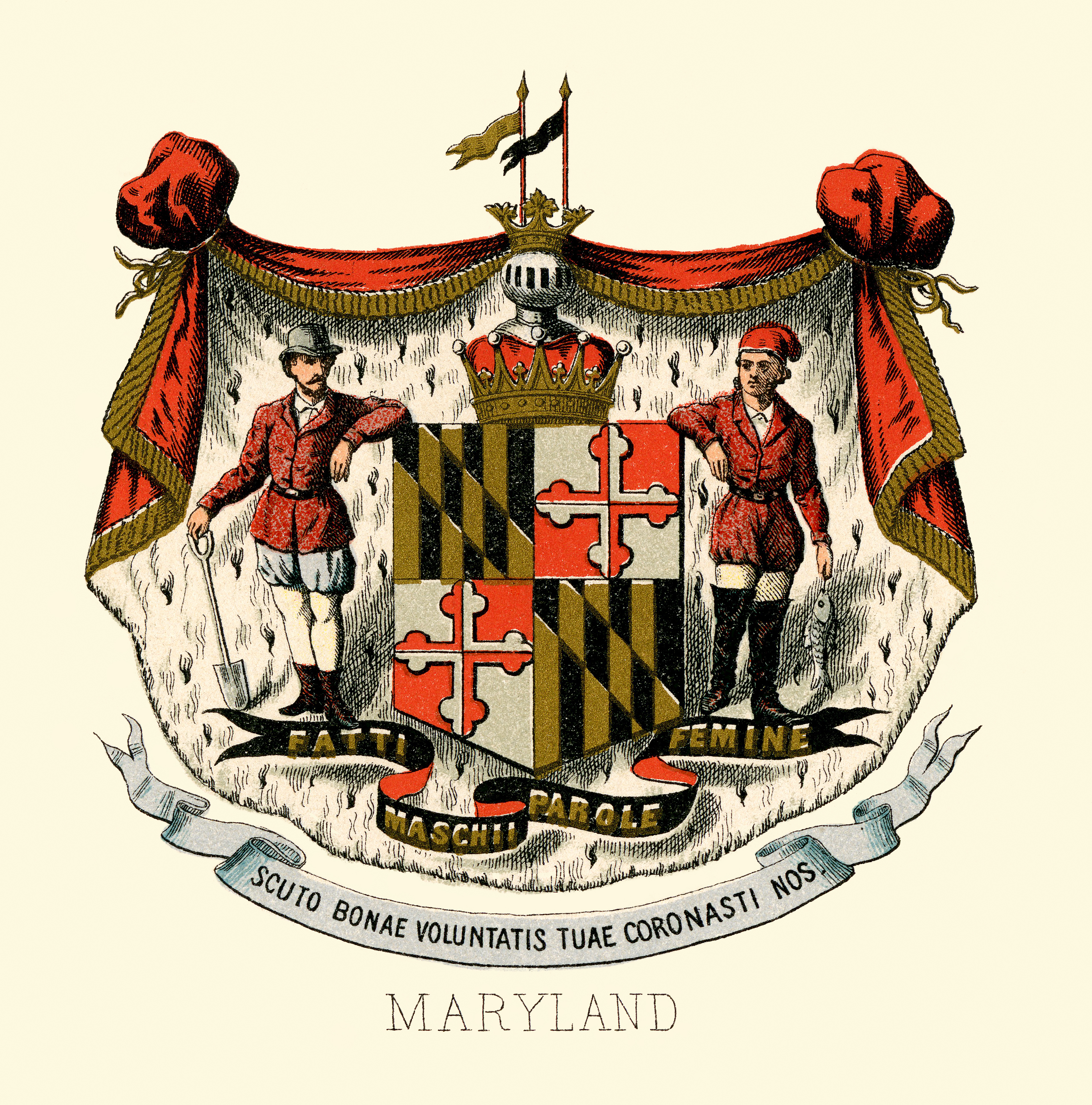
The historical coat of arms of Maryland in 1876

The government of Maryland is conducted according to the state constitution. The government of Maryland, like the other 49 state governments, has exclusive authority over matters that lie entirely within the state's borders, except as limited by the Constitution of the United States.

Power in Maryland is divided among three branches of government: executive, legislative, and judicial. The Maryland General Assembly is composed of the Maryland House of Delegates and the Maryland Senate. Maryland's governor is unique in the United States as the office is vested with significant authority in budgeting. Unlike many other states, significant autonomy is granted to many of Maryland's counties.

Most of the business of government is conducted in Annapolis, the state capital; however some cabinet departments and state officials have their offices in Baltimore. Elections for governor and most statewide offices, as well as most county elections, are held in midterm-election years (even-numbered years not divisible by four).

The judicial branch of state government consists of one united District Court of Maryland that sits in every county and Baltimore City, as well as 24 Circuit Courts sitting in each County and Baltimore City, the latter being courts of general jurisdiction for all civil disputes over $30,000, all equitable jurisdiction and major criminal proceedings. The intermediate appellate court is known as the Appellate Court of Maryland and the state supreme court is the Supreme Court of Maryland. The appearance of the justices of the Supreme Court of Maryland is unique; Maryland is the only state whose justices wear red robes.

=== Taxation ===
Maryland imposes five income tax brackets, ranging from 2 to 6.25 percent of personal income. The city of Baltimore and Maryland's 23 counties levy local "piggyback" income taxes at rates between 1.25 and 3.2 percent of Maryland taxable income. Local officials set the rates and the revenue is returned to the local governments quarterly. The top income tax bracket of 9.45 percent is the fifth highest combined state and local income tax rates in the country, behind New York City's 11.35 percent, California's 10.3 percent, Rhode Island's 9.9 percent, and Vermont's 9.5 percent.

Maryland's state sales tax is six percent. All real property in Maryland is subject to the property tax. Generally, properties that are owned and used by religious, charitable, or educational organizations or property owned by the federal, state or local governments are exempt. Property tax rates vary widely. No restrictions or limitations on property taxes are imposed by the state, meaning cities and counties can set tax rates at the level they deem necessary to fund governmental services.

=== Elections ===
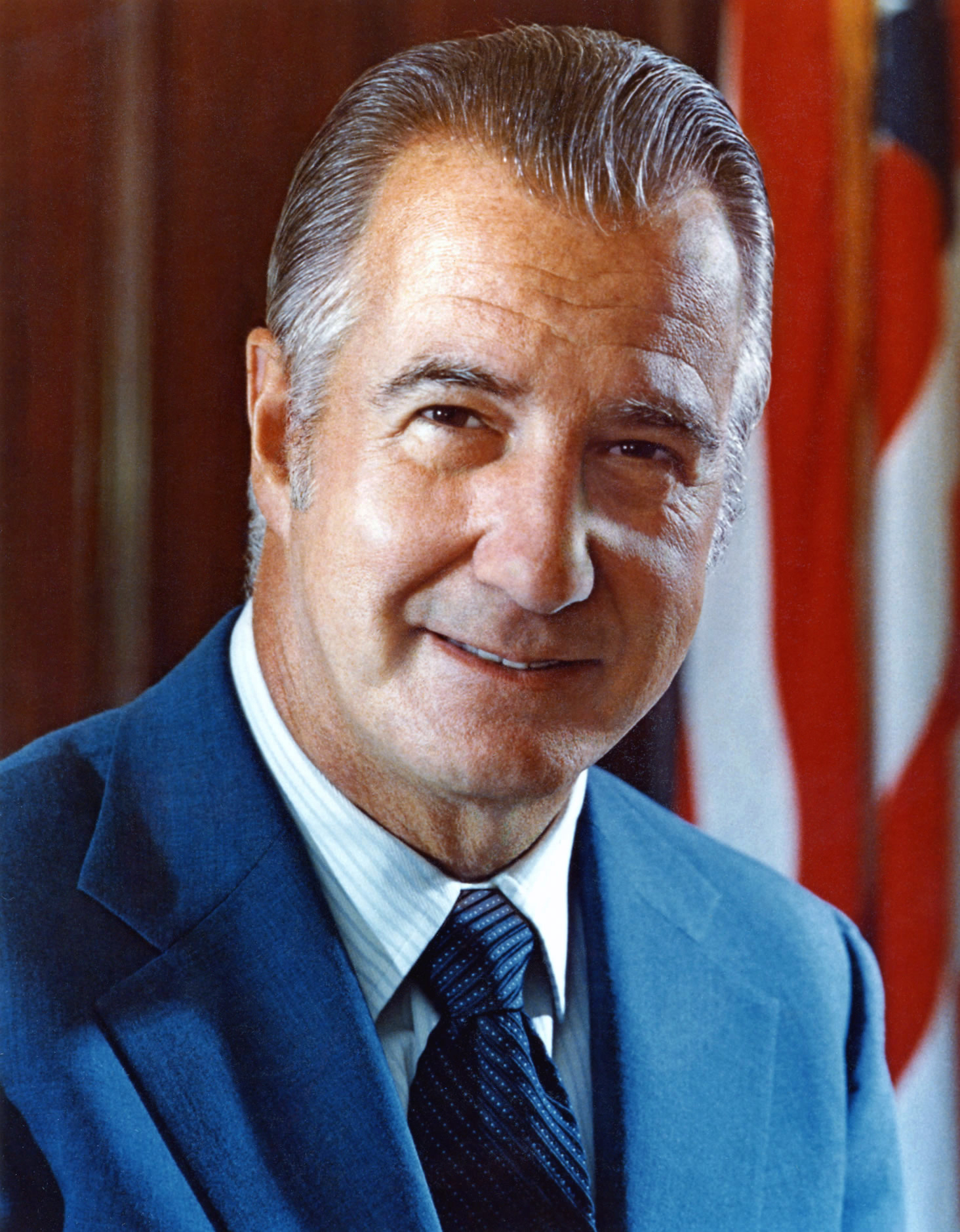
Spiro Agnew, the 39th Vice President of the United States during the Nixon administration, the highest-ranking political leader from Maryland since the nation's founding

Following the American Civil War, Maryland's elections have largely been controlled by the Democratic Party, which accounted for 54.9% of the state's registered voters as of May 2017.

State elections are dominated by Baltimore and four populous suburban counties bordering Washington, D.C., and Baltimore: Montgomery, Prince George's, Anne Arundel, and Baltimore counties. As of July 2017, 66 percent of the state's population resides in these six jurisdictions, most of which contain large, traditionally Democratic voting blocs: African Americans in Baltimore City and Prince George's; federal employees in Prince George's, Anne Arundel, and Montgomery; and post-graduates in Montgomery. The remainder of the state, particularly Western Maryland and the Eastern Shore, is more supportive of Republicans. One of Maryland's best known political figures is a Republican – former governor Spiro Agnew, who pled no contest to tax evasion and resigned in 1973.

In 1980, Maryland was one of six states to vote for Jimmy Carter. In 1992, Bill Clinton fared better in Maryland than any other state, except his home state of Arkansas. In 1996, Maryland was Clinton's sixth best; in 2000, Maryland ranked fourth for Gore; and in 2004, John Kerry showed his fifth-best performance in Maryland. In 2008, Barack Obama won the state's 10 electoral votes with 61.9 percent of the vote, to John McCain's 36.5 percent.

In 2002, former Governor Robert Ehrlich was the first Republican to be elected to that office in four decades, and after one term, he lost his seat to Baltimore Mayor and Democrat Martin O'Malley. Ehrlich ran again for governor in 2010, losing again to O'Malley.

Voter registration and party enrollment in Maryland as of August 2025
Party	Total	Percentage
Democratic	2,232,476	51.67%
Republican	1,030,610	23.86%
Independents / unaffiliated	976,110	22.59%
Green	5,624	0.13%
Working Class	3,384	0.08%
Other parties	72,047	1.67%
Total	4,320,278	100.00%

The 2006 election brought no change in the pattern of Democratic dominance. After Democratic Senator Paul Sarbanes announced that he was retiring, Democratic Congressman Benjamin Cardin defeated Republican Lieutenant Governor Michael S. Steele, with 55 percent of the vote, against Steele's 44 percent.

While Republicans typically win more counties in statewide elections by piling up large margins in the west and east, they are usually overcome by the densely populated and solidly Democratic Baltimore–Washington axis. In 2008, for instance, McCain won 17 counties to Obama's six (plus Baltimore City). While McCain won most of the western and eastern counties by margins of 2-to-1 or more, he was almost completely shut out in the larger counties surrounding Baltimore and Washington; every large county except Anne Arundel went for Obama, who won by 25 points statewide.

From 2007 to 2011, U.S. Congressman Steny Hoyer (MD-5), a Democrat, was elected as Majority Leader for the 110th Congress and 111th Congress of the House of Representatives, serving in that post again from 2019 to 2023. In addition, Hoyer served as House Minority Whip from 2003 to 2006 and 2012 to 2018. His district covers parts of Anne Arundel and Prince George's counties, in addition to all of Charles, Calvert, and St. Mary's counties in southern Maryland.

In 2010, Republicans won control of most counties. The Democratic Party remained in control of eight county governments, including that of Baltimore.

In 2022, Wes Moore replaced Republican Larry Hogan, who did not run for re-election due to term limits. Moore is the first African-American elected Governor of Maryland, and the fifth African-American governor in American history.

=== Immigration ===
In 2025, Maryland passed several pieces of legislation designed to counter immigration-related executive orders from President Trump, among them being the "Protecting Sensitive Locations Act" which limits access of Immigration and Customs Enforcement (ICE) to locales such as schools and health facilities.

== Media ==
A well-known newspaper in Maryland is The Baltimore Sun. Many residents of the Washington metropolitan area receive The Washington Post.

The most populous areas are served by either Baltimore or Washington, D.C. broadcast stations. The Eastern Shore is served primarily by broadcast media based around the Delmarva Peninsula; the northeastern section receives both Baltimore and Philadelphia stations. Garrett County, which is mountainous, is served by stations from Pittsburgh, and requires cable or satellite for reception. Maryland is served by statewide PBS member station Maryland Public Television (MPT).

== Education ==
=== Primary and secondary education ===
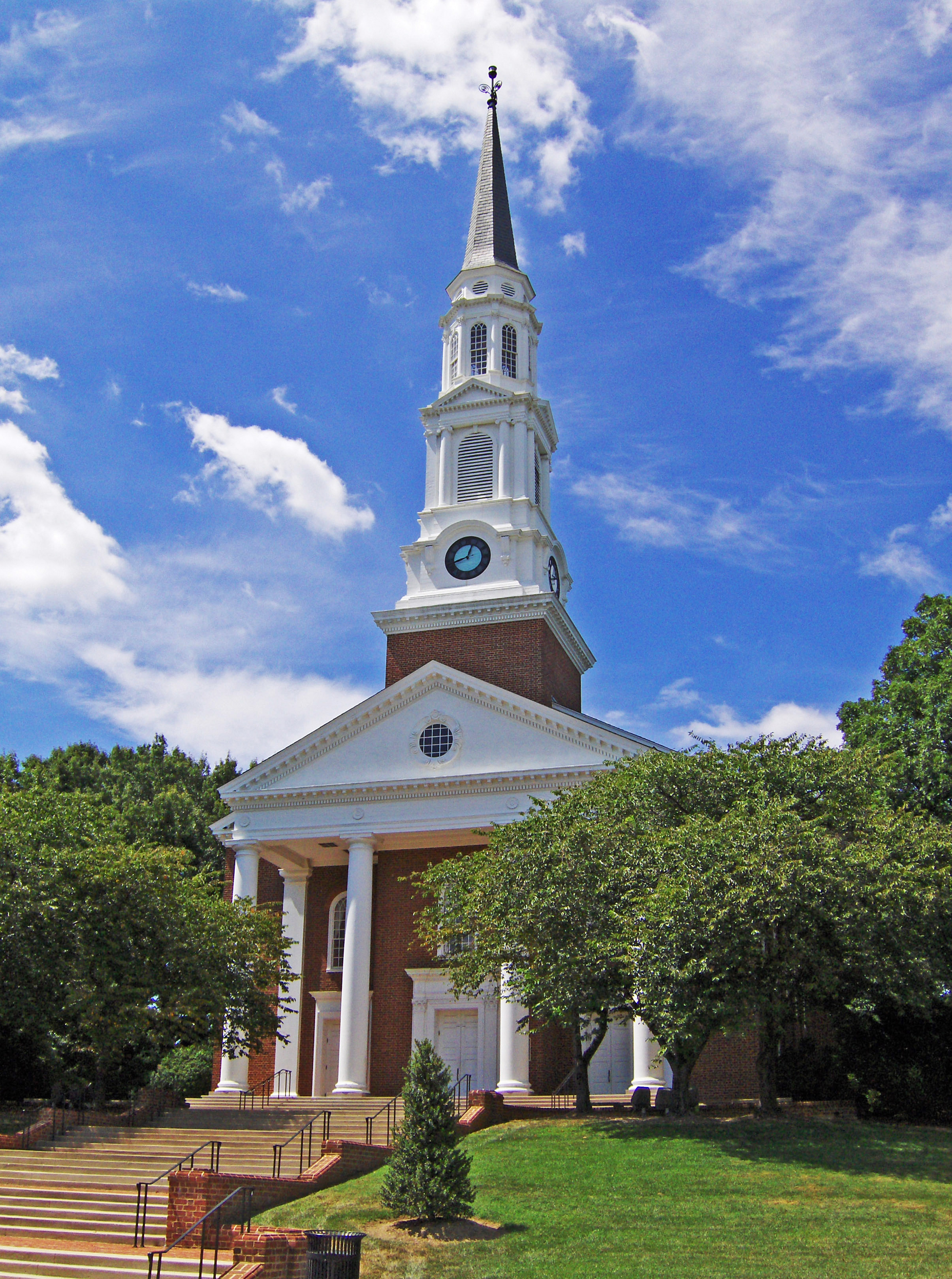
Memorial Chapel at the University of Maryland, Maryland's flagship university

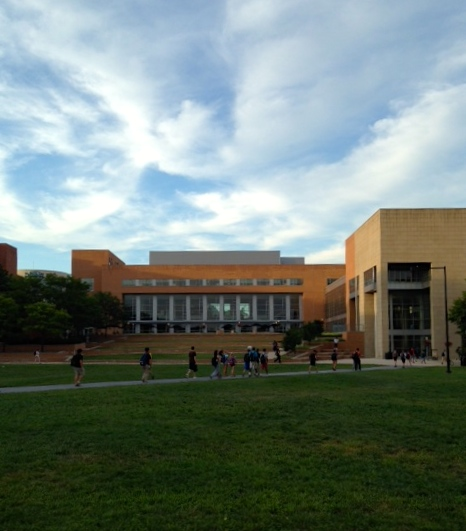
University of Maryland, Baltimore County

Education Week ranked Maryland #1 in its nationwide 2009–2013 Quality Counts reports. Primary and secondary education in Maryland is overseen by the Maryland State Department of Education, which is headquartered in Baltimore. The highest educational official in the state is the State Superintendent of Schools, who is appointed by the State Board of Education to a four-year term of office. The Maryland General Assembly has given the Superintendent and State Board autonomy to make educationally related decisions, limiting its influence on the day-to-day functions of public education. Each county and county-equivalent in Maryland has a local Board of Education charged with running the public schools in that particular jurisdiction.

The budget for education was $5.5 billion in 2009, representing about 40 percent of the state's general fund. Data from the 2017 census shows that, among large school districts, four Maryland districts are in the top six for per-pupil annual spending, exceeded only by the Boston and New York City districts.

Maryland has a broad range of private primary and secondary schools. Many of these are affiliated with various religious sects, including parochial schools of the Catholic Church, Quaker schools, Seventh-day Adventist schools, and Jewish schools. In 2003, Maryland law was changed to allow for the creation of publicly funded charter schools, although the charter schools must be approved by their local Board of Education and are not exempt from state laws on education, including collective bargaining laws.

In 2008, the state led the entire country in the percentage of students passing Advanced Placement examinations. 23.4 percent of students earned passing grades on the AP tests given in May 2008. This marks the first year that Maryland earned this honor. Three Maryland high schools (in Montgomery County) were ranked among the top 100 in the country by US News in 2009, based in large part on AP test scores.

=== Colleges and universities ===
Maryland has several historic and renowned private colleges and universities, the most prominent of which is Johns Hopkins University, founded in 1876 with a grant from Baltimore entrepreneur Johns Hopkins.

The first public university in the state is the University of Maryland, Baltimore, which was founded in 1807 and contains the University of Maryland's only public academic health, human services, and one of two law centers (the other being the University of Baltimore School of Law). Seven professional and graduate schools train the majority of the state's physicians, nurses, dentists, lawyers, social workers, and pharmacists. The flagship university and largest undergraduate institution in Maryland is the University of Maryland, College Park which was founded as the Maryland Agricultural College in 1856 and became a public land grant college in 1864. Towson University, founded in 1866, is the state's second-largest university.

In 1974, Maryland, along with seven other states, mainly in the South, submitted plans to desegregate its state universities; Maryland's plans were approved by the U.S. Department of Health, Education and Welfare.

Baltimore is home to the University of Maryland, Baltimore County and the Maryland Institute College of Art. The majority of public universities in the state (Bowie State University, Coppin State University, Frostburg State University, Salisbury University and the University of Maryland-Eastern Shore) are affiliated with the University System of Maryland. Two state-funded institutions, Morgan State University and St. Mary's College of Maryland, as well as two federally funded institutions, the Uniformed Services University of the Health Sciences and the United States Naval Academy, are not affiliated with the University System of Maryland. The University of Maryland Global Campus is the largest public university in Maryland and one of the largest distance-learning institutions in the world.

St. John's College in Annapolis and Washington College in Chestertown, both private institutions, are the oldest colleges in the state and among the oldest in the country. Other private institutions include Mount St. Mary's University, McDaniel College (formerly known as Western Maryland College), Hood College, Stevenson University (formerly known as Villa Julie College), Loyola University Maryland, and Goucher College, among others.

=== Education assessments and impact ===
There are several state-level assessments which are used to characterize schools and changes in their educational efficacy. The annual Maryland School Report Card which scores districts and individual schools based on graduation rates, attendance information and academic achievement among other factors. The Maryland Comprehensive Assessment Program (MCAP) is an assessment of individual students in English and math, beginning in the 3rd grade. As of 2027, the MCAP will begin to be used to determine whether 3rd grade students would need to repeat the grade level or could proceed to the 4th grade.

=== Public libraries ===
Maryland's 24 public library systems deliver public education for everyone in the state of Maryland through a curriculum that comprises three pillars: Self-Directed Education (books and materials in all formats, e-resources), Research Assistance & Instruction (individualized research assistance, classes for students of all ages), and Instructive & Enlightening Experiences (e.g., Summer Reading Clubs, author events).

Maryland's library systems include, in part:

- Anne Arundel County Public Library
- Baltimore County Public Library
- Cecil County Public Library
- Enoch Pratt Free Library
- Frederick County Public Library
- Harford County Public Library
- Howard County Public Library
- Montgomery County Public Libraries
- Prince George's County Memorial Library System
- St. Mary's County Public Library

Many of the library systems have established formalized partnerships with other educational institutions in their counties and regions.

== Sports ==
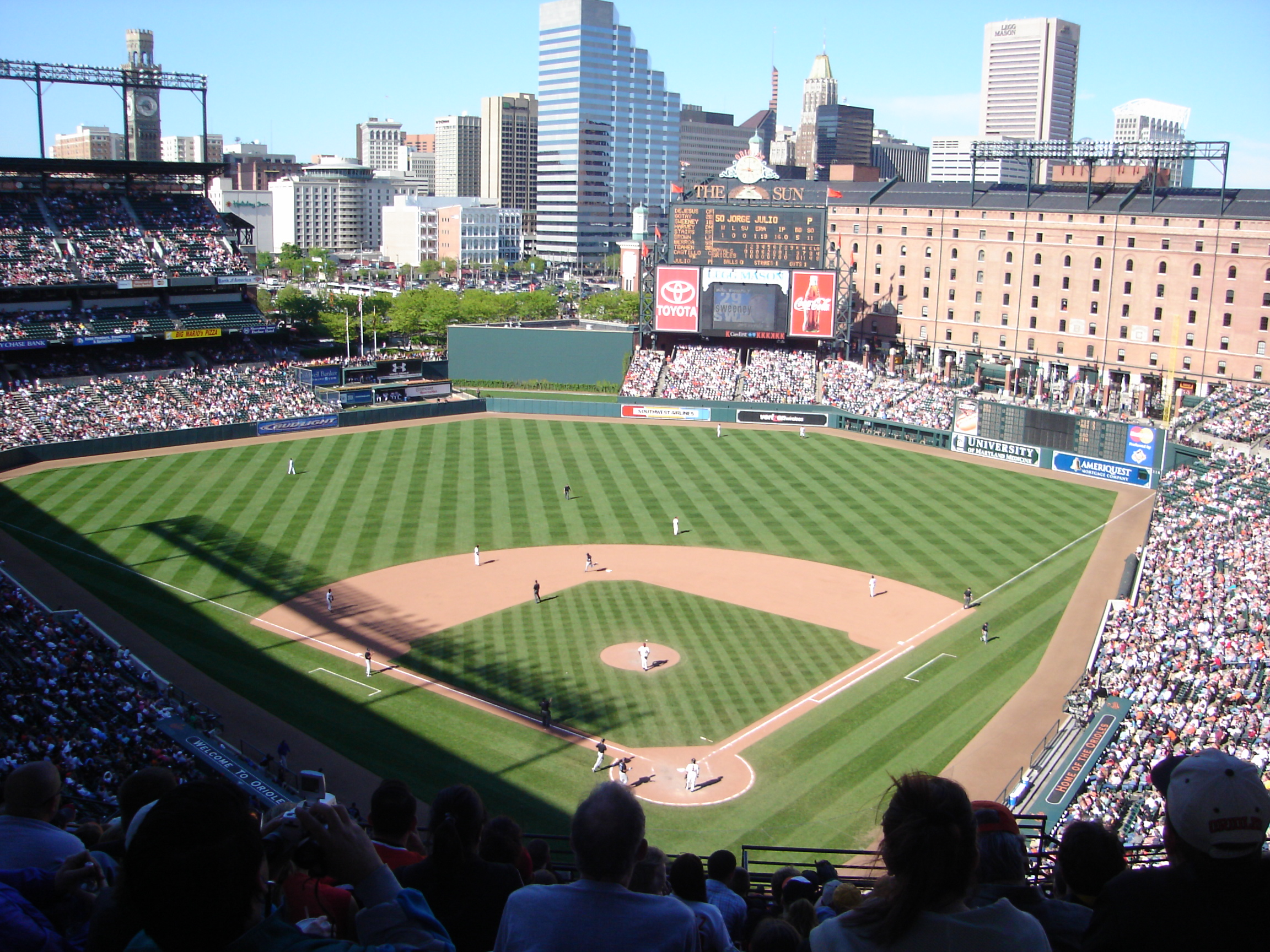
Oriole Park at Camden Yards, home of the Baltimore Orioles

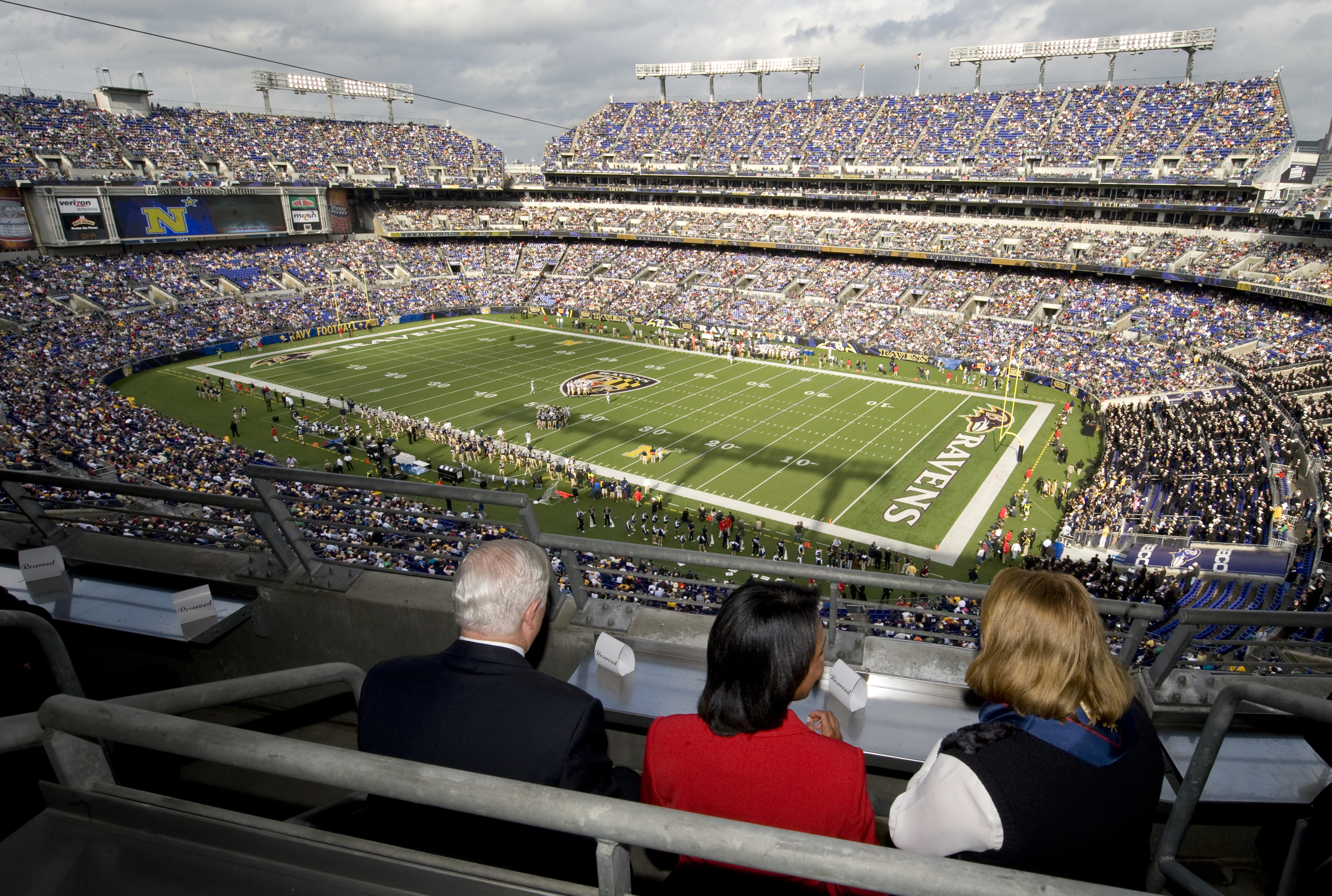
M&T Bank Stadium, home of the Baltimore Ravens

With two major metropolitan areas, Maryland has a number of major and minor professional sports franchises. Two National Football League teams play in Maryland, the Baltimore Ravens in Baltimore and the Washington Commanders in Landover. The Baltimore Colts represented the NFL in Baltimore from 1953 to 1983 before moving to Indianapolis.

The Baltimore Orioles are the state's Major League Baseball franchise. The National Hockey League's Washington Capitals and the National Basketball Association's Washington Wizards formerly played in Maryland, until the construction of an arena in Washington, D.C. in 1997 (now known as Capital One Arena). University of Maryland's team is the Maryland Terrapins.

Maryland enjoys considerable historical repute for the talented sports players of its past, including Cal Ripken Jr. and Babe Ruth. In 2012, The Baltimore Sun published a list of Maryland's top ten athletes in the state's history. The list includes Babe Ruth, Cal Ripken Jr, Johnny Unitas, Brooks Robinson, Frank Robinson, Ray Lewis, Michael Phelps, Jimmie Foxx, Jim Parker, and Wes Unseld.

Other professional sports franchises in the state include three affiliated minor league baseball teams, one independent league baseball team, the Baltimore Blast indoor soccer team, two indoor football teams and three low-level outdoor soccer teams. Maryland is also home to one of the three races in horse racing's annual Triple Crown, the Preakness Stakes, which is run every spring at Pimlico Race Course in Baltimore. The Baltimore Stallions were a Canadian Football Team in the CFL that played the 1994–95 season.

Congressional Country Club has hosted three golf tournaments for the U.S. Open and a PGA Championship.

The official state sport of Maryland, since 1962, is jousting; the official team sport since 2004 is lacrosse. The National Lacrosse Hall of Fame is located in Sparks, Maryland at the USA Lacrosse headquarters. In 2008, intending to promote physical fitness for all ages, walking became the official state exercise. Maryland is the first state with an official state exercise.

== Friendship partners ==
Maryland has relationships with many provinces, states, and other administrative divisions worldwide.

- Bong and Maryland Counties, in Liberia
- Jalisco, Mexico (1996)
- Cross River and Ondo States, Nigeria
- KwaZulu-Natal, South Africa
- Medan Marelan, Indonesia
- (Republic of Ireland) County Cork, Ireland
- Anhui Province, China
- Harju County, Estonia
- Hauts de France, France
- Piura Province, Peru
- Rio de Janeiro, Brazil

== See also ==
- Index of Maryland-related articles
- Outline of Maryland
- List of people from Maryland
- USS Maryland, 4 ships

== Bibliography ==
- Brugger, Robert J. (1988). Maryland, A Middle Temperament: 1634–1980. Baltimore: Johns Hopkins University Press. ISBN 978-0-8018-5465-1.
- Chappelle, Susan Ellery Green; et al. (1986). Maryland: A History of its People. Baltimore: Johns Hopkins University Press. ISBN 978-0-8018-3005-1.
- Davis, William Wilkins. Religion and Politics in Maryland on the Eve of the Civil War: The Letters of W. Wilkins Davis. Foreword by Charles W. Mitchell. 1988; rev. ed., Eugene, Ore.: Wipf & Stock, 2009.
- Denton, Lawrence M. (1995). A Southern Star for Maryland. Baltimore: Publishing Concepts. ISBN 978-0-9635159-3-3.
- Marsh, Carole (2011). My First Pocket Guide About Maryland. Gallopade International. p. 5. ISBN 9780635086280.

Preceded by Massachusetts	List of U.S. states by date of admission to the Union; Ratified Constitution on April 28, 1788 (7th)	Succeeded by South Carolina
