= Maryland Route 8 =

State highway in Queen Anne's County, Maryland, US

Maryland Route 8
- Maryland Route 8 highlighted in red

Route information
- Maintained by MDSHA
- Length: 8.37 mi (13.47 km)
- Existed: 1960–present

Major junctions
- South end: Romancoke Pier in Romancoke
- MD 802 near Matapeake; MD 835A in Stevensville; US 50 / US 301 in Stevensville
- North end: MD 18 in Stevensville

Location
- Country: United States
- State: Maryland
- Counties: Queen Anne's

Highway system
- Maryland highway system; Interstate; US; State; Scenic Byways
← MD 7	→ MD 10

Maryland Route 8 (MD 8) is a state highway in the U.S. state of Maryland. Known for most of its length as Romancoke Road, the state highway runs 8.37 miles (13.47 km) from Romancoke Pier in Romancoke north to MD 18 in Stevensville. MD 8 is the main north–south highway of Kent Island in western Queen Anne's County. The state highway is also the first highway encountered on U.S. Route 50 (US 50)/US 301 east of the Chesapeake Bay Bridge. South of Matapeake, MD 8 is paralleled by the Kent Island South Trail.

The section of MD 8 from Stevensville to Matapeake was constructed in 1930 to serve the Annapolis–Matapeake ferry service of the Claiborne-Annapolis Ferry Company. The highway between Matapeake and Romancoke was constructed in 1938 to serve that company's Romancoke–Claiborne ferry. The Stevensville–Matapeake road was originally designated MD 404 and was briefly part of US 50 in the early 1950s. The Matapeake–Romancoke highway was briefly MD 17 before becoming MD 33. After the Chesapeake Bay Bridge opened in 1952, the MD 33 designation was extended north to Stevensville. MD 8 replaced MD 33 on Kent Island in 1960.

== Route description ==
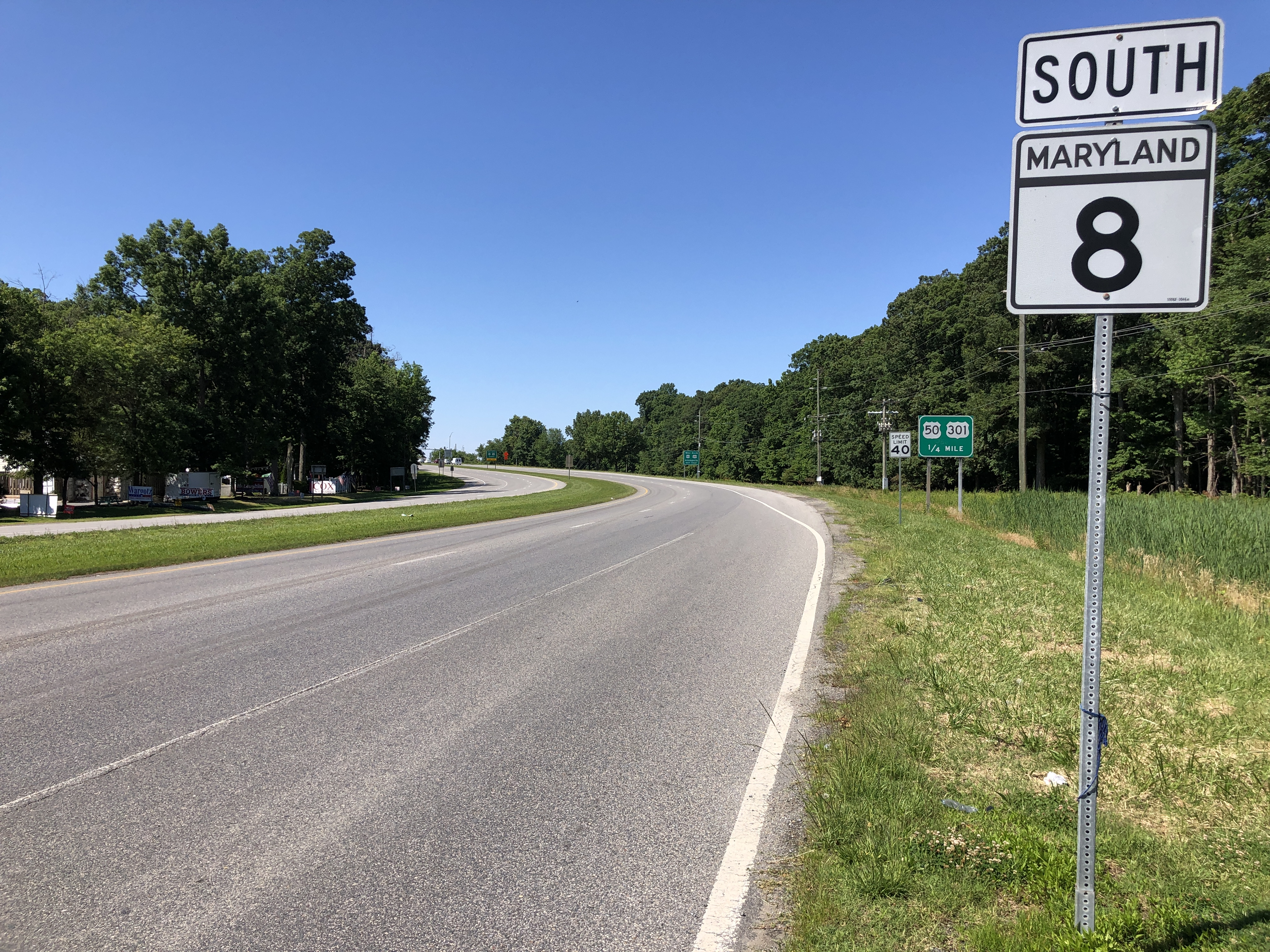
View south along MD 8 at MD 18 in Stevensville

MD 8 begins at the Romancoke Pier in the unincorporated community of Romancoke. The state highway heads west as two-lane undivided Romancoke Road. MD 8 curves to the north, intersecting Kent Point Road on a tangent. The state highway passes a mix of farmland, forest, and residential subdivisions on its way north. In the hamlet of Normans, the old alignment of MD 8, MD 802 (Batts Neck Road), splits off and later rejoins the present alignment. MD 8 continues north through Matapeake, where the highway passes east of Matapeake State Park, the former site of the cross-bay ferry. Just north of Bay Bridge Airport, the state highway expands to a four-lane divided highway and intersects MD 835A (Thompson Creek Service Road), which provides access to a park and ride lot serving MTA Maryland commuter buses that is located to the east of the road. Immediately to the north, MD 8 meets US 50/US 301 (Blue Star Memorial Highway) at a diamond interchange; this interchange, Exit 37, is the first exit east of the Chesapeake Bay Bridge. The highway's name changes to Business Parkway at the interchange, shortly before MD 8 reaches its northern terminus at MD 18. MD 18 heads north as Business Parkway toward Love Point and east as Main Street toward the Stevensville Historic District and Chester.

== History ==
The first section of present MD 8, from Stevensville to the Matapeake ferry landing, was paved in 1930 to serve the newly inaugurated Annapolis–Matapeake ferry across the Chesapeake Bay in 1930. The highway was designated as a westward extension of MD 404 in 1933. The highway from Matapeake to Romancoke was built in 1938 to serve the newly inaugurated Romancoke–Claiborne ferry across Eastern Bay. In 1939, the Romancoke–Matapeake highway was designated as a western extension of MD 17, which ran from Claiborne to Easton. The highway became part of MD 33 in 1940 when old MD 33—now modern MD 17 in Frederick County—and old MD 17 swapped numbers.

In 1949, US 50 was extended east of Annapolis and replaced MD 404 west of Wye Mills. As a result, the highway between Matapeake and Stevensville became US 50. When the Chesapeake Bay Bridge was completed in 1952, US 50 followed a new divided highway east toward Queenstown. MD 33 was extended north from Matapeake to MD 18 in Stevensville. The Romancoke–Claiborne ferry was discontinued by 1954, but MD 33 remained on Kent Island until it was replaced with the MD 8 designation in 1960. MD 8's interchange with US 50/US 301 was completed by 1987. A divided highway, Business Parkway, was completed at the same time from south of the interchange to Love Point Road where MD 18 presently intersects MD 835C north of the Stevensville Historic District. MD 8's northern terminus moved south to its present location when MD 18 was extended west to Business Parkway in 1989.

== Junction list ==
The entire route is in Queen Anne's County.

Location	mi	km	Destinations	Notes
Romancoke	0.00	0.00	Romancoke Pier	Southern terminus
Normans	4.23	6.81	MD 802 north (Batts Neck Road)	Southern terminus of MD 802
Matapeake	5.24	8.43	MD 802 south (Batts Neck Road)	Northern terminus of MD 802
Stevensville	7.87	12.67	MD 835A (Thompson Creek Service Road)	MD 835A is signed as such
Stevensville	8.05	12.96	US 50 / US 301 (Blue Star Memorial Highway) – Easton, Annapolis	US 50 / US 301 Exit 37; diamond interchange
Stevensville	8.37	13.47	MD 18 (Main Street/Business Parkway) – Chester, Love Point	Northern terminus
1.000 mi = 1.609 km; 1.000 km = 0.621 mi

== Auxiliary route ==
MD 8A is the designation for the 0.10-mile (0.16 km) section of two-lane undivided Batts Neck Road between MD 8 and MD 802 south of Matapeake. Batts Neck Road continues east from MD 802 as a county highway.
