= Maryland Route 802 =

State highway in Maryland, United States

Maryland Route 802
- Batts Neck Road

Route information
- Maintained by MDSHA
- Length: 1.02 mi (1.64 km)
- Existed: 1973–present

Major junctions
- South end: MD 8 in Normans
- North end: MD 8 in Matapeake

Location
- Country: United States
- State: Maryland
- Counties: Queen Anne's

Highway system
- Maryland highway system; Interstate; US; State; Scenic Byways
← MD 800	→ MD 804

Maryland Route 802 (MD 802) is a state highway in the U.S. state of Maryland. Known as Batts Neck Road, the state highway runs 1.02 miles (1.64 km) as a north–south highway between junctions with MD 8 in Normans on Kent Island. MD 802 is the old alignment of MD 8 through Normans. The state highway was assigned after MD 8 was relocated by the early 1970s.

== Route description ==
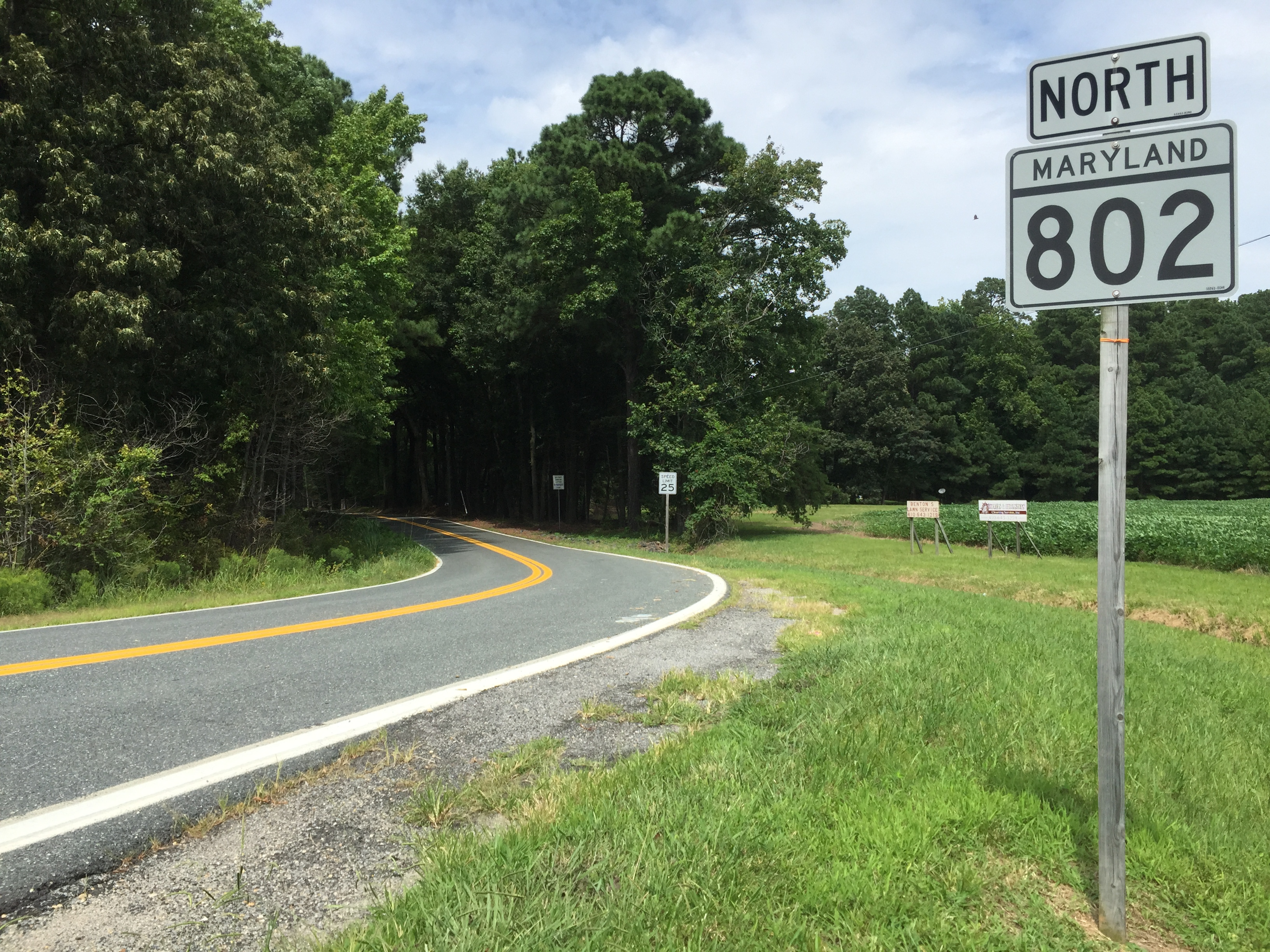
View north along MD 802 at MD 8 in Normans

MD 802 begins at an intersection with MD 8 (Romancoke Road) in the unincorporated community of Normans north of Romancoke. The state highway heads north as a narrow two-lane undivided road past residences in a forested area and intersects Batts Neck Road, an east–west county highway that provides access to the namesake peninsula. MD 802 continues north to Matapeake Farm Lane, where the highway widens and turns west to its northern junction with MD 8 between Normans and Matapeake.

== History ==
MD 802 is the original alignment of MD 8 through Normans. The highway was constructed in 1938 as part of the Matapeake–Romancoke highway constructed to serve the newly inaugurated Romancoke–Claiborne ferry across Eastern Bay. This highway became a western extension of MD 17, which originally ran from Claiborne to Easton, in 1939. The number changed to MD 33 when MD 33 and MD 17 swapped numbers in 1940. The highway's number changed again when MD 8 replaced MD 33 on Kent Island in 1960. MD 802 was assigned to its current length after MD 8 was relocated through Normans by 1973.

== Junction list ==
The entire route is in Queen Anne's County.

Location	mi	km	Destinations	Notes
Normans	0.00	0.00	MD 8 (Romancoke Road) – Romancoke	Southern terminus
Normans	0.29	0.47	Batts Neck Road	Batts Neck Road between MD 8 and MD 802 is unsigned MD 8A
Matapeake	1.02	1.64	MD 8 (Romancoke Road) – Stevensville	Northern terminus
1.000 mi = 1.609 km; 1.000 km = 0.621 mi
