= Matapeake =

Matapeake may refer to:

- Matapeake, Maryland, an unincorporated community located south of Stevensville on Kent Island, Maryland
- Matapeake people, a Native American tribe of eastern Maryland
- Matapeake State Park, a state park managed by Queen Anne's County located in Matapeake, Maryland
