= Matapeake State Park =

State park on Kent Island in Queen Anne's County, Maryland

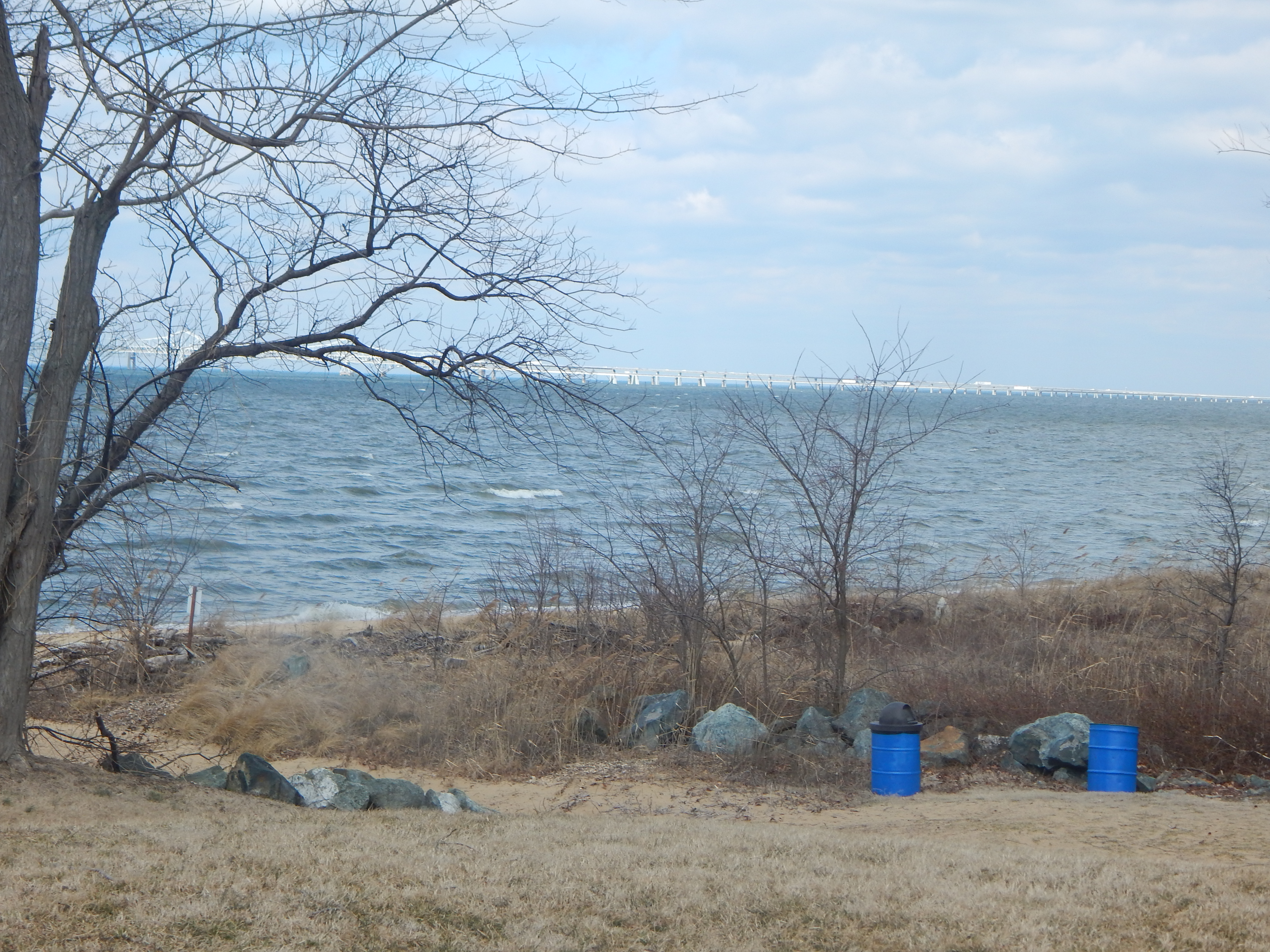
- Shoreline of Matapeake State Park with Chesapeake Bay Bridge in the distance

- Location within Maryland
- Location: Matapeake, Maryland, United States
- Nearest city: Annapolis, Maryland
- Coordinates: 38°57′13″N 76°21′09″W
- Area: 21 acres (8.5 ha)
- Elevation: 23 ft (7.0 m)
- Established: 2009
- Administrator: Queen Anne's County, Maryland
- Designation: Maryland state park
- Website: Official website

Matapeake State Park is a Maryland state park located along the Chesapeake Bay in Matapeake, Kent Island, Maryland. The landing served the state-owned Chesapeake Bay Ferry System before the Chesapeake Bay Bridge opened. The park is leased and managed by Queen Anne's County.

== History ==
The park occupies the site of a ferry landing that had served the Chesapeake Bay Ferry System on its run across the bay from Kent Island to what is now Sandy Point State Park. The park land was first acquired by the state in 1941 with the purchase of the Claiborne-Annapolis Ferry Company, which became the Chesapeake Bay Ferry System. The Sandy Point-Matapeake Ferry was discontinued in 1952. Afterwards, uses for the land by the state included a shooting range and a building housing a scale model of the Chesapeake Bay. The bay model was made obsolete by computer simulations, and the building was left vacant. Following the 2003 collapse of the building during that year's Presidents' Day snowstorm, the county resumed renovation of the ferry terminal building and renamed it the Matapeake Clubhouse. The Matapeake Clubhouse and adjoining public beach opened to the public in May 2009.

== Activities and amenities ==
Park grounds include the restored ferry house and former ferry landing, which is used as a fishing pier. The park offers a swimming beach, amphitheater, trails, picnicking area, dog beach, and views of the Bay Bridge. It is the northern terminus of the paved South Island Trail, which extends 7 miles (11 km) from the park to Romancoke Fishing Pier.
