= Kent Island (Maryland) =

Largest Island and historic place in the Chesapeake Bay, United States

Native name: Monoponson
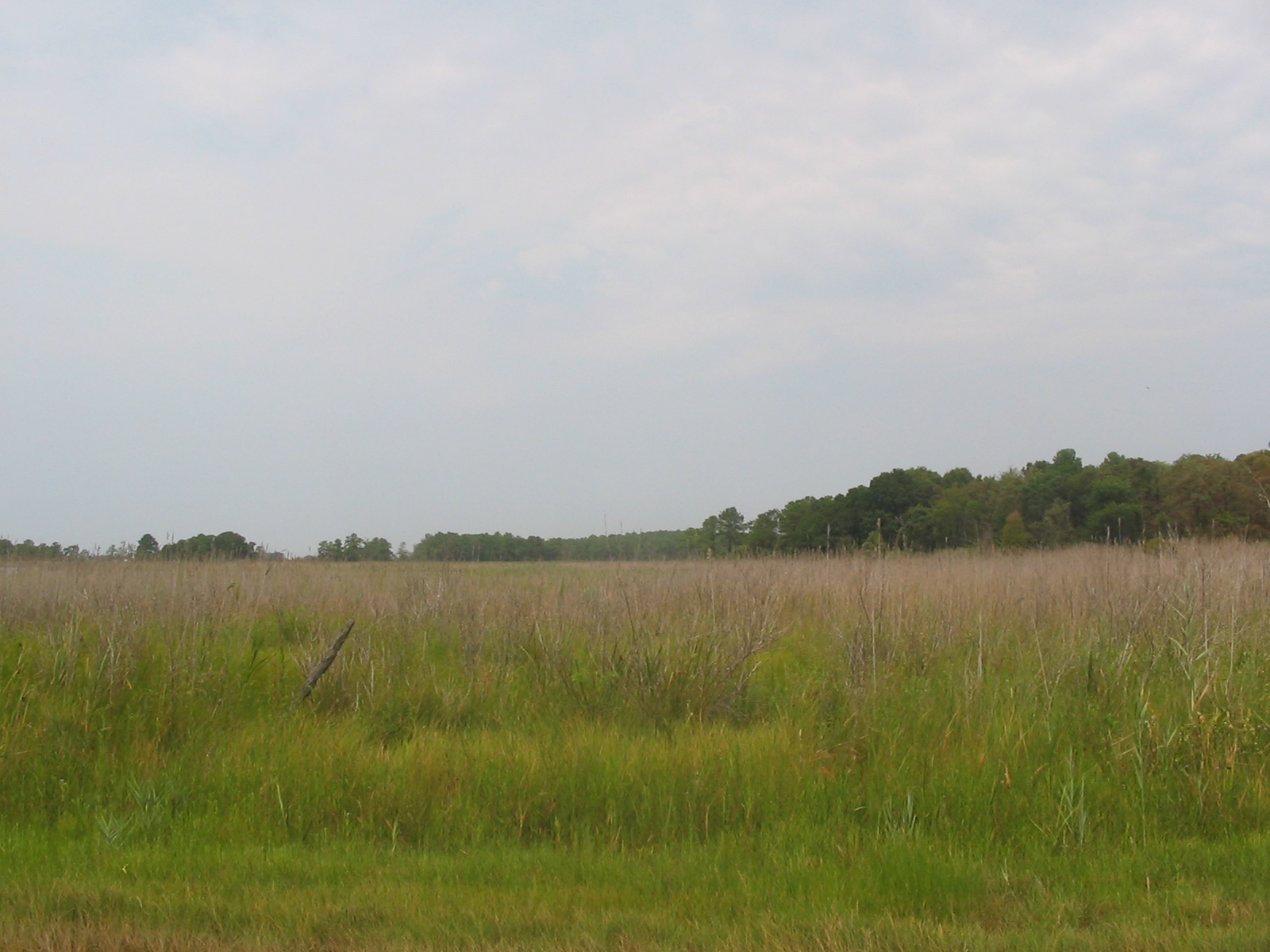
- Marshland on Kent Island

- Location within Maryland

- Location within the Chesapeake Bay

Geography
- Location: Chesapeake Bay, [[]]
- Coordinates: 38°56′55″N 76°18′54″W
- Area: 31.62 sq mi (81.9 km^{2})
- Length: 15 mi (24 km)
- Width: 6 mi (10 km)
- Coastline: 157 mi (253 km)
- Highest elevation: 61 ft (18.6 m)

Administration
- United States

Demographics
- Population: 20,110 (2023)
- Pop. density: 254/km^{2} (658/sq mi)
- Ethnic groups: White=86% Black=5% Native American=2% other=3%

Kent Island is the largest island in the Chesapeake Bay and a historic place in Maryland, United States. To the east, a narrow channel known as the Kent Narrows barely separates the island from the Delmarva Peninsula, and on the other side, the island is separated from Sandy Point, an area near Annapolis, by roughly four miles (6.4 km) of water. At only four miles wide, the main waterway of the bay is at its narrowest at this point and is spanned here by the Chesapeake Bay Bridge. The Chester River runs to the north of the island and empties into the Chesapeake Bay at Kent Island's Love Point. To the south of the island lies Eastern Bay. The United States Census Bureau reports that the island has 31.62 square miles (81.90 km^{2}) of land area.

Kent Island is part of Queen Anne's County, Maryland, and Maryland's Eastern Shore region. The first English establishment on the island, Kent Fort, was founded in 1631, making Kent Island the oldest English settlement within the present day state of Maryland and the third oldest permanent English settlement in what became the United States—after Jamestown, Virginia (1607), and Plymouth, Massachusetts (1620). The census-designated places of Stevensville and Chester are located on the island, along with several other communities, including the fishing community of Kent Narrows, which is located partially on the island. Although all of Kent Island's communities are unincorporated, the census designated places of Stevensville and Chester on the island are both more populous than any of Queen Anne's County's incorporated towns.

== History ==
=== Early and Colonial ===
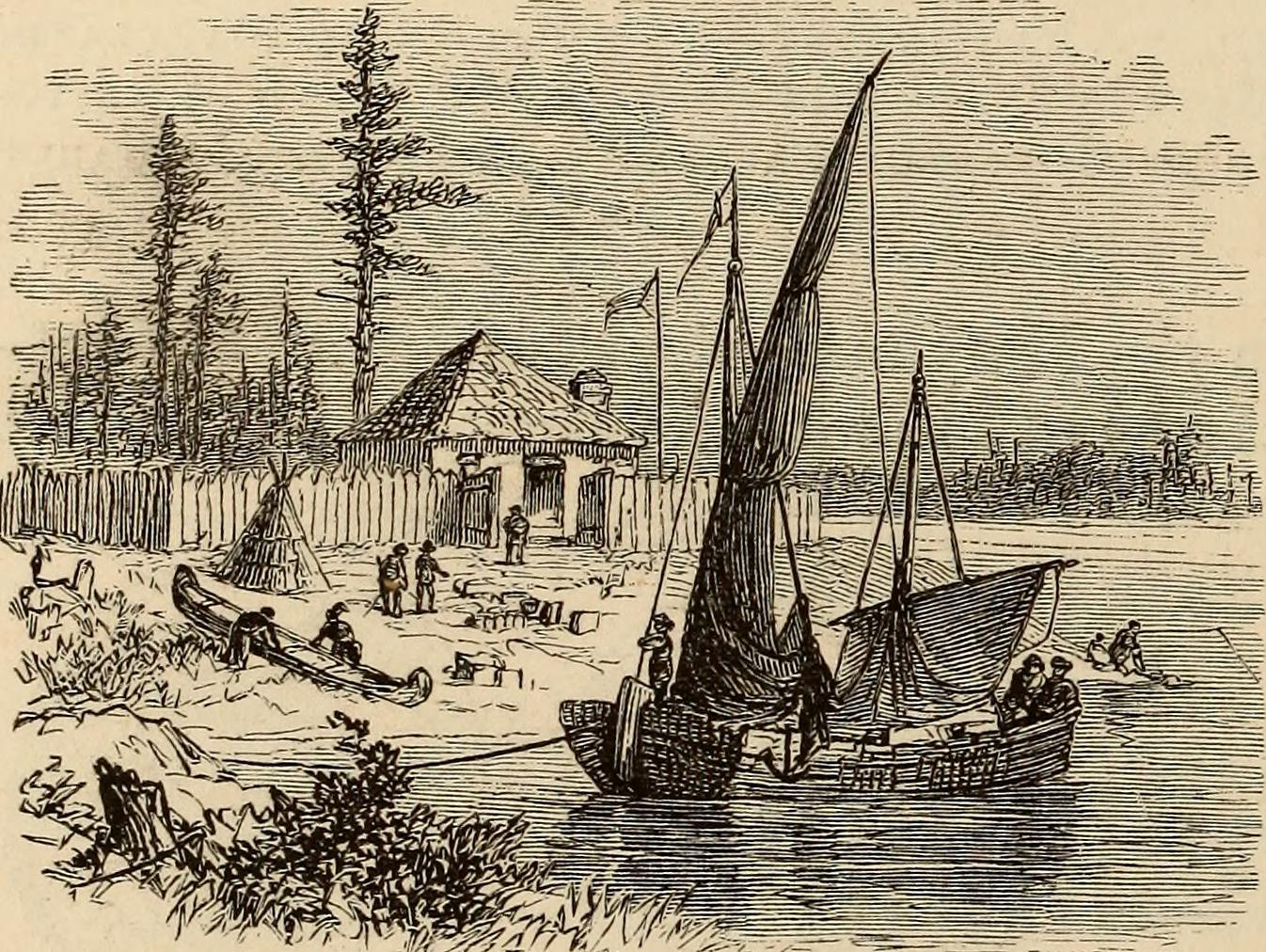
William Claiborne's trading post on Kent Island, 1635

Before European colonization, Kent Island was inhabited by Native Americans for nearly 12,000 years. The island was inhabited by the Matapeake people, members of the Algonquian nation, after whom the Matapeake area of Kent Island is named. Other tribes that inhabited the area and often visited the island included the Ozinie tribe. The Matapeake people referred to the island as Monoponson in their language. During the 16th and 17th centuries, early explorers of the Chesapeake Bay, including Captain John Smith (who had named the area "Winstons Iles"), were the first Europeans to see Kent Island; however, it wasn't until August 1631 that the island became an English settlement. At that time, William Claiborne, a resident of Jamestown, Virginia, founded a settlement near the southern end of the island for the purpose of trading with Native Americans and named the land "the Isle of Kent" after his birthplace of Kent, England.

The settlement burned down in the winter of 1631–32 but was quickly rebuilt, and in 1634 the settlement included a gristmill, courthouse, and trading station. Following the formation of the province of Maryland, Claiborne continued to recognize the island as part of his home colony of Virginia, while Cecilius Calvert, 2nd Baron Baltimore recognized it as part of Maryland. Claiborne was forced from and returned to the island twice before leaving permanently in 1658, thus effectively ending the disputes. Virginia's official claims to the island, however, continued until 1776.

During the War of 1812 the island was occupied by British forces from the 102d Regiment of Foot and the Royal Marines.The island was used as a base for naval forces under the command of Rear Admiral George Cockburn. Its position allowed the British to simultaneously threaten Baltimore and Annapolis. Kent Island had a population of enslaved Black people; because British commanders were willing to offer enslaved Black people an opportunity to escape the United States or enlist in British armed forces, individuals enslaved on Kent Island used the British presence to secure their freedom.

=== Industrial Revolution ===
Until the early 19th century, Kent Island was used almost entirely for farming of tobacco and corn, however that ended due to the depletion of nutrient-rich soil as a result of the lack of crop rotation and poor farming practices. The island's economy went into decline while the soil recovered, except for the port town of Broad Creek. This began to change around the time of the Industrial Revolution. In 1850, the town of Stevensville, was founded after the sale of farms owned by James and Charles Stevens and prospered as a major hub for steamboat travel across the Chesapeake Bay. Stevensville was also the home of a railroad station known as the Stevensville Train Depot that was located near the western end of a railroad that carried ferry passengers to other parts of the Eastern Shore. Also during this time, small resorts on the shores of the Chesapeake Bay and the Atlantic Ocean were established in the area. Such a resort existed at Love Point, to the north of Stevensville. Farming returned to the economy in the nineteenth and twentieth centuries with farmers growing crops including corn, wheat, berries, and melons. Many of the island's inhabitants worked as watermen in the expanding seafood industry capitalizing on the Chesapeake's supply of Maryland Blue Crab, rockfish, and oysters.

=== Twentieth century ===
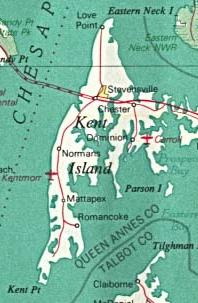
A map of Kent Island from 1970

As roads replaced railroads and steamboats into the twentieth century, there was a growing need for a road bridge connecting the two shores of the Chesapeake Bay. In 1952 the Chesapeake Bay Bridge was completed, connecting the island directly to the Baltimore-Washington Metropolitan Area. The bridge completely replaced the steamboat system and also led to further growth of Kent Island and the rest of the Eastern Shore. In 1973, to accommodate growing traffic across the bay, the bridge was expanded with an additional span built next to the existing one. Then, in the late 1980s and early 1990s U.S. Route 50 was converted to a freeway across the island.

=== Recent history ===
In September 2003, Kent Island was one of the many places in the Chesapeake Bay Area affected by Hurricane Isabel. Local businesses and historic local landmarks were either damaged or destroyed in the storm and the storm surge caused by it. Much of the damage from the hurricane, mostly caused by flooding, took several months to repair.

Today, Kent Island is considered a suburb of the Baltimore-Washington Metropolitan Area and was home to 16,812 residents at the time of the 2000 U.S. census. The combined area of the Stevensville and Chester CDPs had 9,603 residents. Many have relocated from the Washington, D.C., or Baltimore metro areas and continue to commute back there. Stevensville and Chester are also among the most densely populated areas of the Eastern Shore, and the most densely populated in Queen Anne's County, making up 23.67 percent of its population and only 3.07 percent of its land area.

=== Historic places ===
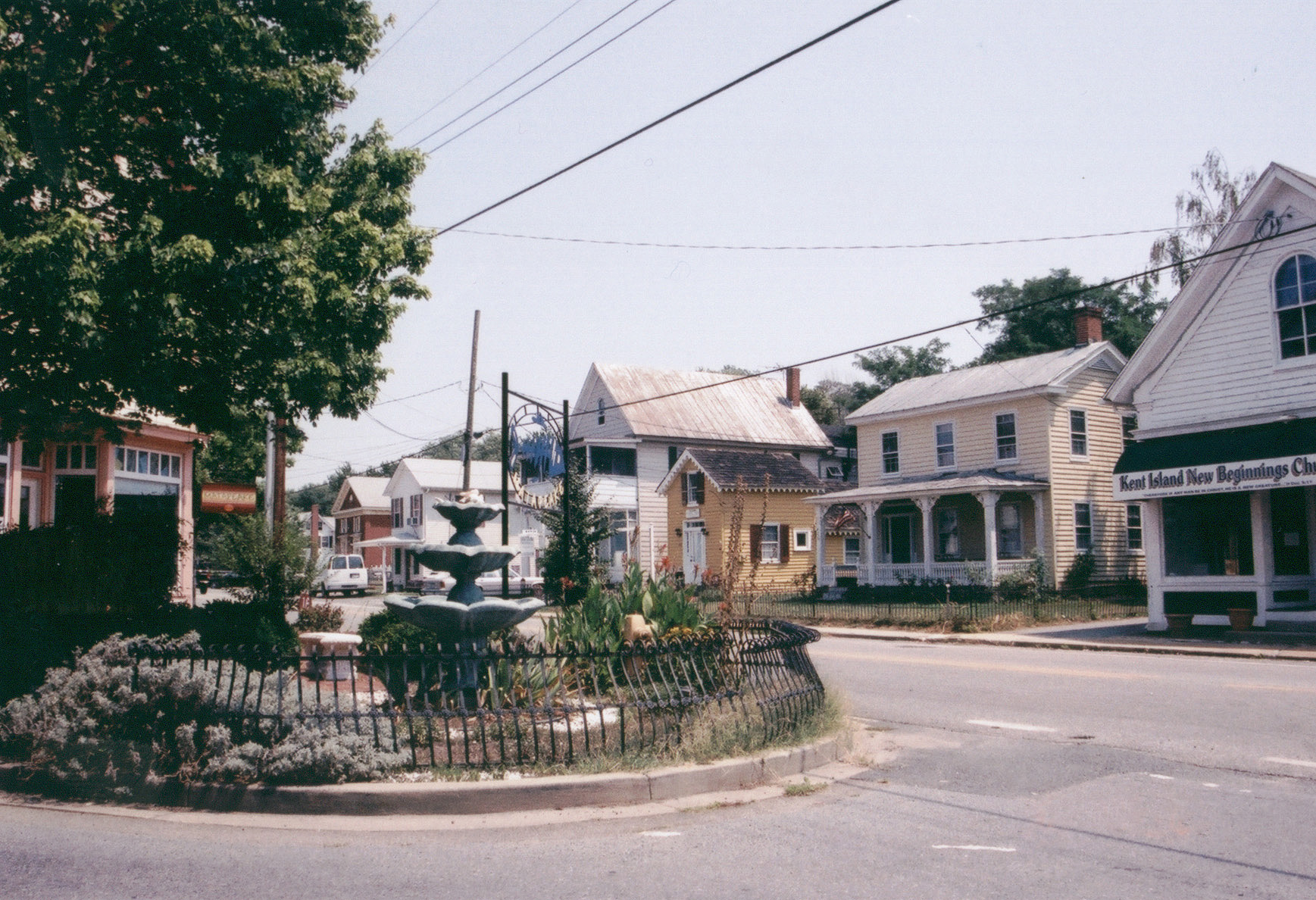
Love Point Road (viewed from Old Cockey Lane) in Historic Stevensville

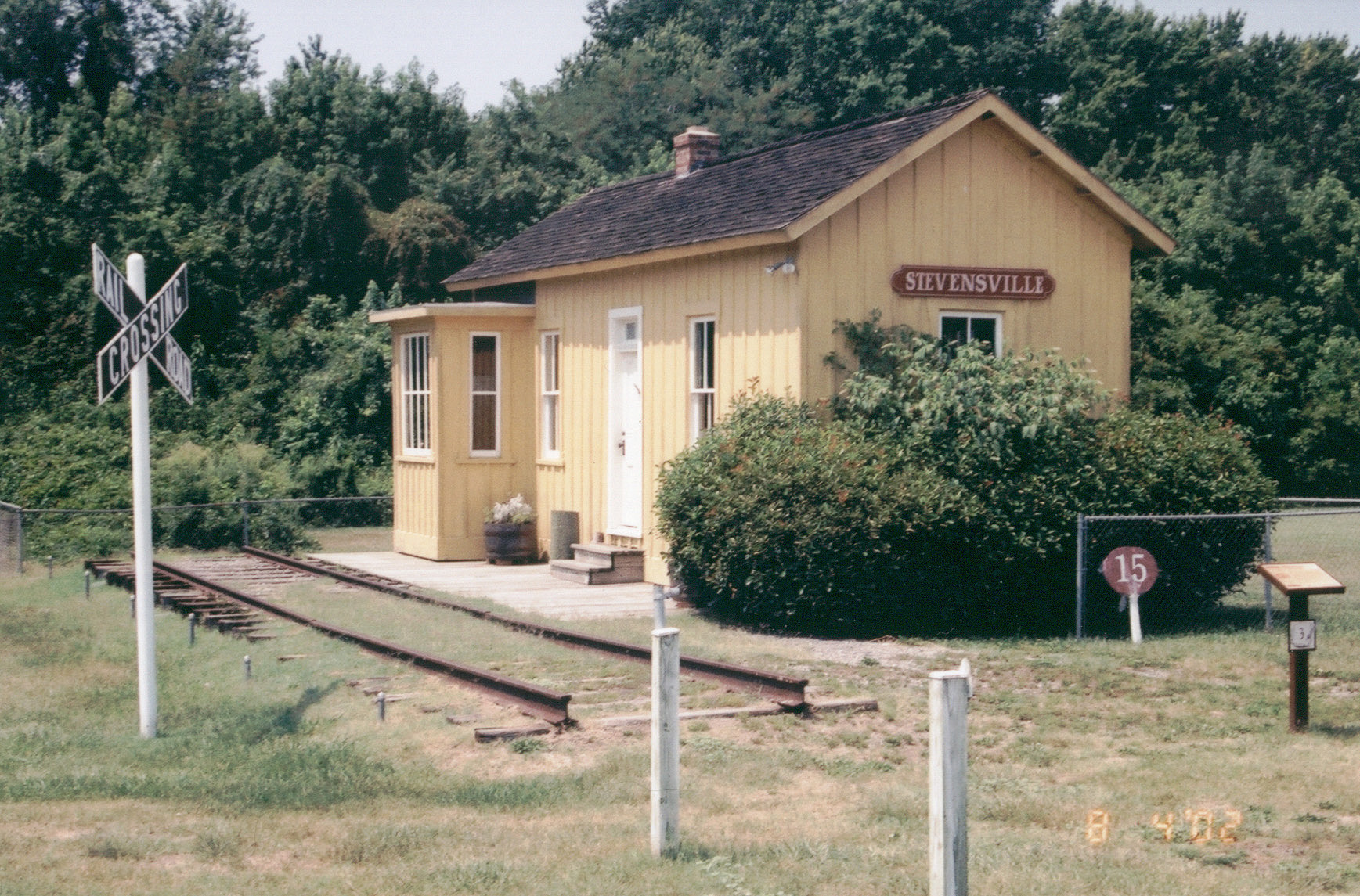
Stevensville Train Depot

As of 2006, many of the island's historic places have been preserved and are highlighted by the Chesapeake Country Scenic Byway and the American Discovery Trail, both of which pass through the island. Several buildings on the island that are still leftover from the 19th century and earlier include the Cray House, a rare remaining example of post and plank construction, the old Stevensville post office (left, yellow building in center), the Stoopley Gibson Manor, Christ Episcopal Church, and the Stevensville Train Depot (right). Stevensville's historic district along with some of the buildings in the town are on the National Register of Historic Places.

== Notable residents ==
Listed are notable people who have lived on Kent Island.

- Brock Adams – United States Secretary of Transportation and United States Senator from Washington
- Henry W. Baird – U.S. Army general, born on Kent Island
- Elbert N. Carvel – Governor of Delaware
- William Claiborne – Founder of Kent Island
- James Earickson – former State Treasurer of Missouri
- Henry R. Gibson – U.S. representative from Tennessee
- Theodore N. Lerner – Principal owner of the Washington Nationals
- Herbert D. Riley - U.S Navy Vice Admiral, highly decorated officer, Commanding Officer of USS Makassar Strait, World War II Veteran of Iwo Jima and Okinawa

== Transportation ==
=== Roads ===
The main mode of transportation on Kent Island, as with most other suburban areas of the United States, is the automobile. Kent Island's main roads include the U.S. Route 50/U.S. Route 301 freeway, which connects the island to Central Maryland via the Chesapeake Bay Bridge and to the Delmarva Peninsula via the Kent Narrows Bridge. The island is also served by Maryland Routes 8, 18, and 552.

=== Public transportation ===
On week days, the Maryland Department of Transportation offers four commuter bus routes to take Kent Island commuters to Baltimore or Washington, D.C. The County Ride, a transportation service operated under the Department of Aging, is available as well. It provides specialized transportation services for elderly people and people with disabilities while still serving the general public. It travels to Grasonville, Easton, Centerville, Annapolis, and other towns. It also provides door to door rides with a minimum of two days notice.

=== Trails ===
The original section of the Cross Island Trail, a walking and biking trail on Kent Island, was built in the late 1990s, as part of Queen Anne's County's portion of the American Discovery Trail. The full trail was completed in 2001.

By the time the Cross Island Trail was completed, growing concern over the safety of pedestrians using the shoulder of Route 8 prompted the construction of a new trail paralleling the road. When completed, the trail, known as the Kent Island South Trail, will run from Romancoke Pier at the southern end of Route 8, heading north and crossing the road in Matapeake, near Matapeake Elementary and Middle schools. From there it will pass through Mobray Park, then over US 50, through Stevensville to end at the Cross Island Trail in or near Old Love Point Park.

Both the Cross Island and Kent Island South Trails are part of a planned trail system for Queen Anne's County; the entire Cross Island Trail and the existing section of the Kent Island South Trail represent the only completed portions of the system.

=== Connections to the mainland ===
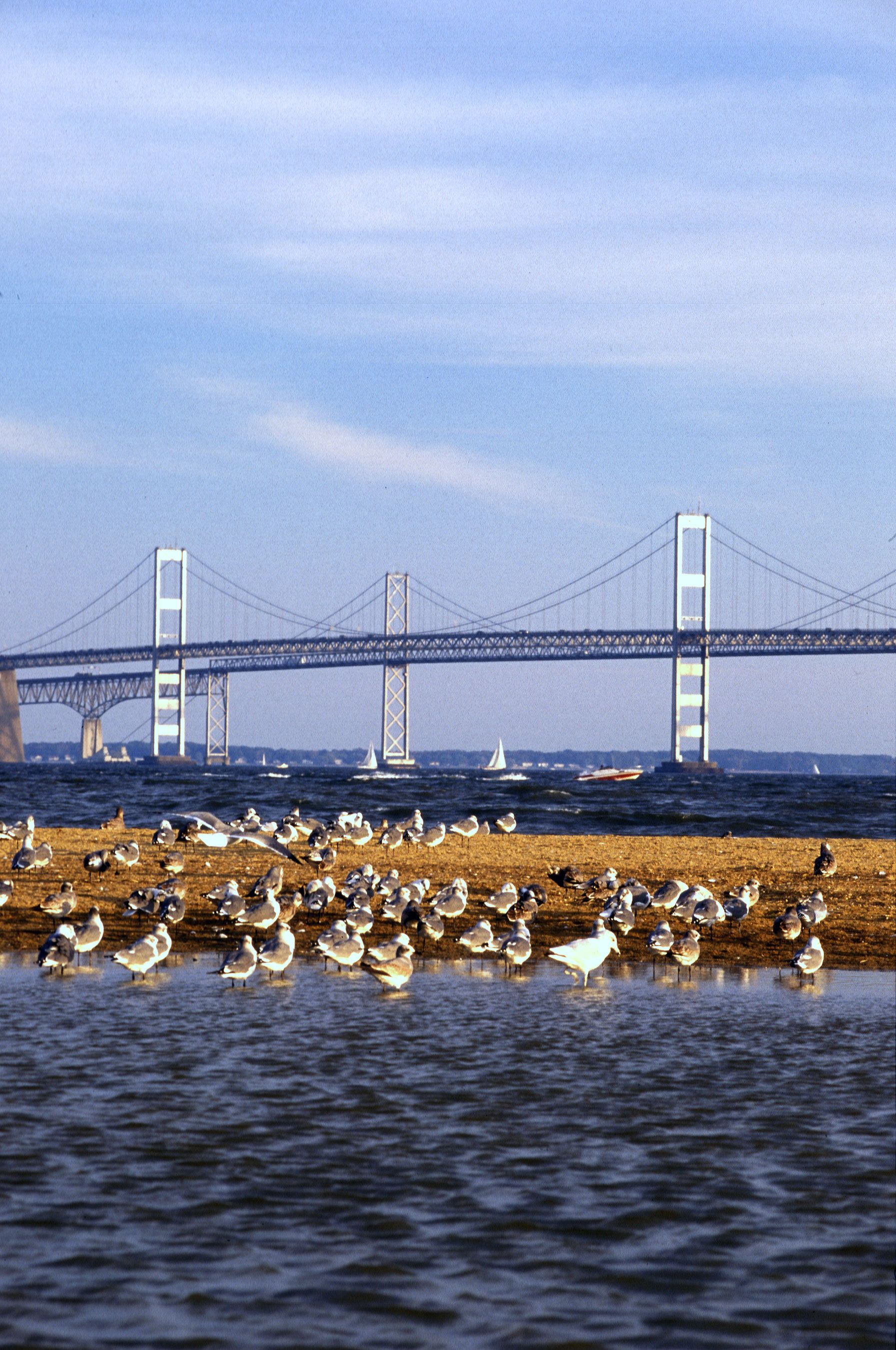
The Chesapeake Bay Bridge

The bridges that currently connect Kent Island to the mainland, or once did, are as follows:

- The Chesapeake Bay Bridge, or Bay Bridge, spans the Chesapeake Bay and carries US 50/301 to Annapolis.
- The Kent Narrows Bridge spans the Kent Narrows and carries US 50/301 to the Delmarva Peninsula.
- The Old Kent Narrows Bridge, Kent Narrows Drawbridge, or Route 18 Kent Narrows Bridge is a drawbridge that carries Maryland 18 into Grasonville. It was the predecessor to the current Kent Narrows Bridge and now serves local traffic.
- An even older automobile bridge once ran across the Kent Narrows and was replaced by the current Route 18 Kent Narrows Bridge. Also in the past, railroad bridges over the Kent Narrows connected the Kent Island portion of the Queen Anne's County Railroad to the mainland.

Access to Annapolis is available via MTA Commuter Bus Service Route 210. Weekday service to the mainland begins at 5:30 am and the last bus to leave Washington departs at 6:48 pm. Also, access to Washington, D.C., is available via MTA Commuter Bus Service Route 240 and 250. Weekday service to the mainland begins at 5:00 am for Route 240 and 4:45 am for Route 250 and the last bus to leave Washington departs at 7:28 pm for Route 240 and 7:08 pm for Route 250.

Local airports on the island serve as another type of connection to the mainland. The largest is the Bay Bridge Airport, located near the Chesapeake Bay Bridge. Before the construction of the Bay Bridge, ferry services connected the island directly to Baltimore, Annapolis, and the small peninsula on which St. Michaels, is located. Some of the piers that were used as part of the ferry service are still used for fishing.

Into the 1930s the Baltimore and Eastern Railroad operated passenger service from Love Point on the northern extreme of the island east to Queenstown, Easton, Hurlock, as well as Salisbury's Union Station, Ocean City, Maryland, Berlin, and Delmar, Delaware. However, passenger service was terminated by 1938.

== See also ==
- List of islands in Maryland
- Kent Island High School
- The Kent Island Bay Times
