= Nancy Lynn =

American aerobatic pilot

Nancy A. Lynn
- Nancy Lynn in her Extra 300 aerobatic airplane.
- Born: Dayton, Ohio
- Died: October 14, 2006; Culpeper, Virginia
- Cause of death: Plane crash
- Education: Denison University
- Occupations: Aerobatic pilot Flight school instructor Motivational speaker
- Employer(s): Lynn Aviation, Inc.
- Spouse: Scott Muntean
- Children: Pete Muntean

Nancy A. Lynn (c. 1956 – October 14, 2006) was an aerobatic pilot, flight instructor, and air show performer. She owned and operated Lynn Aviation, an aerobatic flight school located at Bay Bridge Airport in Stevensville, Maryland, with her husband Scott Muntean and son Pete.

== Biography ==
Nancy A. Lynn was born in Dayton, Ohio, the daughter of Dayton attorney James T. Lynn.

After graduating from Denison University, Lynn began working for Procter & Gamble in the 1980s and became one of the first women to hold a position as manufacturing plant manager. Lynn worked as a manager for Procter & Gamble in Ohio, North Carolina and Baltimore for 16 years while learning to fly as a hobby.

While working Procter & Gamble in Baltimore, Lynn began taking commercial flight lessons in 1988 and soon discovered a passion for aerobatic flight. After a year of lessons, she quit her job with Procter & Gamble, cashed in her pension plan, and bought a Pitts S-2B aerobatic biplane to enter in International Aerobatic Club competitions.

In March 1993, Lynn's husband, Scott Muntean, crashed her Pitts into a cornfield field in near Queenstown, Maryland. Even though Muntean lost his left eye, he flew again. He died from brain cancer in 2000, widowing Lynn.

Lynn was "regarded as a serious competitor" in the Advanced aerobatic competition category flying the Extra 300L. She was also known as "a top-level instructor," and gave more than 3,000 hours of aerobatic flight instruction to students from around the world. In 1998, she started performing in air shows. At the time of her death, she was one of the seven percent of all pilots who are female.

In addition to teaching aerobatics, Lynn worked as a consultant and appeared in safety videos released by the Aircraft Owners and Pilots Association and hosted segments of the program "Wing Tips" on Discovery Wings. Lynn felt that flying was a metaphor for life and would speak to children, civic groups, and businesses.

== Culpeper Airfest crash ==
On October 14, 2006, Nancy Lynn was flying her Extra Flugzeugbau GMBH 300 in the Culpeper Airfest at the Culpeper Regional Airport (CJR), Culpeper, Virginia. The only female pilot in the show, Lynn had been flying for approximately 6 to 7 minutes when her plane crashed alongside Runway 22. The crash created a 950-foot path, which ended 50 feet from the edge of the runway.

At the time of the crash, Lynn was reportedly flying a series of flat spins, during which the left wingtip struck the ground. The aircraft was sent over an embankment, landing upside down and on fire. Rescue crews, along with Lynn's son Pete who had been narrating her flight, rushed to the scene and were able to cut Lynn from the badly damaged and burned aircraft. Lynn was flown to a local hospital with burns covering 90% of her body. She was pronounced dead later that same night.

The National Transportation Safety Board (NTSB)'s investigation showed that the propeller had been shattered on impact, but no evidence of mechanical engine failure existed. Witnesses and video footage of the accident indicated Lynn was flying at a constant engine power throughout the maneuver and subsequent accident sequence. Lynn's son Pete has stated she simply flew too low and was unable to pull out of the maneuver. The NTSB later issued a determination which stated the probable cause as "the pilot’s disorientation while performing an aerobatic maneuver, which resulted in the airplane’s inadvertent impact with the ground."

== Legacy ==
A memorial service was held in Lynn's hangar at Bay Bridge Airport in Maryland, but even it was not large enough to hold all the mourners who attended. The following year, in October 2007, Culpeper County’s Air Fest was held in memory of Lynn, with the show's theme billed as "A tribute to Nancy Lynn".

Lynn's skill as a pilot earned her a display at the International Women's Air & Space Museum. The exhibit, titled "Nancy Lynn: Inspiration Was Her Mission" covers Lynn's life and career as a female pilot and remained on display through September 2007. Lynn is also featured in Above and Beyond:100 years of Women in Aviation, an award-winning documentary produced by Art-Reach International.

A college fund was established for Lynn's son, Pete Muntean, who was 18 at the time of the crash. In 2020, Pete joined CNN as a correspondent in Washington, D.C., and covers aviation for the network. Like his late mother, Pete also competes in aerobatic flying competitions and is a flight instructor.

== See also ==
- 2006 in aviation
- List of people who died in aviation accidents and incidents
- List of airshow accidents and incidents
