= Claiborne, Maryland =

Unincorporated community in Maryland, United States

- Unincorporated community
- Location within Maryland Location within the United States
- Coordinates: 38°50′15″N 76°16′40″W
- Country: United States
- State: Maryland
- County: Talbot
- Elevation: 3 ft (0.91 m)
- Time zone: UTC-5 (Eastern (EST))
  - Summer (DST): UTC-4 (EDT)
- ZIP code: 21624
- Area codes: 410, 443, and 667
- GNIS feature ID: 583793

Claiborne is an unincorporated community in Talbot County, Maryland, United States. The village is located on the eastern shore of the Chesapeake Bay near the mouth of the Eastern Bay at 38°50′15″N 76°16′40″W, and uses ZIP code 21624. The 2000 U.S. census listed the population as 147 and the number of homes as 84, slightly down from its 1941 population of 156. Between 1890 and 1930, the village was a busy port for passenger and then automobile ferry service across the Chesapeake Bay, with numerous stores and motels/resorts, including Maple Hall and the Bellfonte Hotel. A post office was added in 1893 and the Protestant Episcopal Church of Claiborne was built in 1898. In 1912, an elementary school and Methodist Church were added. Before 1912, students attended school in nearby McDaniel. The town's first school consisted of the kitchen of the local railroad pavilion, used as a classroom. In 1913, the town became home to the Claiborne Fresh Air Association, Inc., (“Miracle House”) which was formed for the purpose of providing 10 weeks of fresh air and summer vacation for children who had been exposed to tuberculosis. The role of Claiborne as a terminal for cross-Bay ferries was diminished in 1930 when the primary route shifted to Matapeake in Kent Island. It ended altogether in 1938 when the direct connection from Annapolis to Claiborne was terminated and only an auxiliary shuttle between Claiborne and Romancoke on Kent Island remained. This shuttle service ended in 1952, a few months after the opening of the Chesapeake Bay Bridge; thus ending all ferry service to Claiborne after more than six decades.

== History ==
Prior to the 1870s, Claiborne was part of the nearby McDanieltown postal community (now McDaniel). Its name can be traced back in honor of William Claiborne, a fur trader who founded an English settlement on nearby Kent Island in 1631. Early land patents in Claiborne included "Rich Neck Manor," which was first granted 2,000 acres to Capt. William Mitchel, Esq. in 1649 Subsequent owners of Rich Neck, Philip Land, built a chapel in the 1650s. The Rich Neck Manor Chapel still stands, but is private property. Rich Neck was also home to Matthew Tilghman, the head of the Maryland delegation to the Continental Congress, and Lloyd Tilghman, Confederate general.

It was past the entrance to today's Claiborne harbor that British vessels passed during the War of 1812, landing in McDanieltown, within sight of Claiborne.

The area of town now known as "Old Claiborne," was located on Tilghman's Creek facing the Miles River. It included a steam sawmill started by John Hansel Tunis around 1867. "Bingham's Steamboat Wharf" was created in 1867 to support a planned resort at "Bingham's Mineral Springs," with thrice-weekly service between Old Claiborne and Baltimore and other destinations up the Miles River to St. Michaels. By 1877, John Tunis' son, Joseph Tunis, had added the Claiborne Oyster Company, a boatyard, a few homes, two more steamboat wharves, and expanded his father's sawmill into the Claiborne Saw and Planing Mills. At the foot of Rich Neck Road was a general store. Tunis also laid out grids for a new community of 188 lots and advertised them for between $18 and $40. A plat of it appears in an 1877 county atlas, showing eight main streets with the names: Rich Neck Road, Leeds, Ward, Progress, Monument, Tilghman, and Dom Pedro. At its center was Henry Clay Square, a large area reserved for public buildings. Joseph Tunis provided a slogan: “Young man don’t go West, but to Claiborne.” The village did not develop as Tunis had hoped and by 1893, Tunis had abandoned his plans. In later years several families from North Carolina who knew or where employed by the Tunis family in their North Carolina lumber mills relocated to "Old Claiborne", for example Ben Perry whose home in "Old Claiborne" was built in 1905.

A second community, the "new" Claiborne, was started in 1886 when Gen. Joseph B. Seth and the Baltimore & Eastern Shore Railroad Company agreed to begin ferry and railroad service between Claiborne and Bay Ridge, on the western shore of the Chesapeake Bay. Seth along with Theophilus Tunis and Frank Turner envisioned a resort community similar to Bay Ridge and laid out plans for the "new" Claiborne, calling it "Bay City”.

Although "Bay City" never developed as expected, Claiborne's importance was raised once the ferries began operating with Claiborne as a primary terminus on the Eastern Shore. In 1890 the Baltimore & Eastern Shore Railroad Company completed a railroad line from Claiborne to Easton so that passengers coming into Claiborne could continue through to Ocean City. Initially the plan was to use rail-transfer steamers to move rail cars between Bay Ridge and Claiborne but this was abandoned in late 1891 and a conventional passenger ferry service between Baltimore and Claiborne was substituted. This service failed to provide adequate cash flow to service the outstanding debt, and the Baltimore & Eastern Shore Railroad was liquidated in August 1894. The assets were purchased by the newly created Baltimore, Chesapeake and Atlantic Railway.

Steamer service by the Baltimore, Chesapeake and Atlantic Railway continued until 1924 when BC&A had shifted its traffic to Love Point. In 1927 the Baltimore, Chesapeake, & Atlantic Railway filed for bankruptcy and was sold at foreclosure on March 28, 1928. One parcel was for the company's railroad and the Claiborne ferry, and was sold for $650,000. At that point passenger rail service from Claiborne to points further east was discontinued, and the Claiborne-McDaniel section of the rail line was removed in 1938.

In 1916, the recently amended Panama Canal Act precluded the operation for ferry lines by railroad companies, with exceptions permitted only via approval of the Interstate Commerce Commission. The ICC ordered the Pennsylvania Railroad, parent of the Baltimore, Chesapeake & Atlantic Railway, to terminate its Chesapeake ferry operations, with the exception of the Love Point and Claiborne routes since those were seen as extensions of the rail lines, rather than competitors. Local merchants on the Eastern Shore protested the order to close, World War I intervened, and the order was effectively dismissed in the early 1920s.

A second ferry company, the Eastern Shore Development Steamship Company, began service in 1912 between Claiborne and Annapolis starting with the steamer "Atlantic" and then switching over in December 1912 to the steam yacht "Texas", formerly owned by Edward H. R. Green, the son of Wall Street investor Henrietta Green. That business, owned by New York investors A.J. McIntosh, B.A. Sinn and J.W.R. Crawford, failed in 1916. It had proven too difficult for the new ferry company to compete against the established railroad ferry, as the latter added capacity, shifted schedules and refused to wait for arriving ferries from the Eastern Shore Development Steamship Company, even as it would for its own ferries. The railroad also refused to sell joint tickets with the new ferry competitor and charges connecting rail passenger in Claiborne a premium compared to its own bundled rail-ferry tickets. The matter was submitted to the ICC for action and the two parties negotiated a partial solution before the ICC was forced to act.

In 1919, another competing ferry, Claiborne-Annapolis Ferry, Inc. (later the Claiborne-Annapolis Ferry Company), began service between Claiborne and Annapolis. On Sunday evening it was not uncommon for traffic to be backed up several miles into Claiborne, waiting for the return ferry trip across the Chesapeake Bay. The increased automobile traffic to Claiborne forced the state to take the then unusual step of passing a special roads bill to improve the road between Claiborne and Easton, Maryland. In 1921, bus service was added from Claiborne to Easton, Hurlock, and Cambridge. In 1926 the service was enhanced with the introduction of the first "double-ender" ferry, the "Gov. Albert C. Ritchie." At that point the ferry company began to earn strong profits.

In 1928 Claiborne-Annapolis Ferry, Inc. was restructured and renamed the Claiborne-Annapolis Ferry Company. In 1930 the primary eastern terminal for cross-Bay ferries from Annapolis was moved from Claiborne to a new ferry terminal at Matapeake, on Kent Island. This significantly shortened the distances involved for most people leaving Annapolis. While direct service between Claiborne and Annapolis was continued after 1930, by the mid-1930s that service had been downgraded significantly.

In 1938 the ferry route to Claiborne was changed to run between Claiborne and Romancoke on Kent Island. This ended direct cross-Bay service to Claiborne. In 1943 the western terminal was moved from Annapolis to Sandy Point. Ferry service stopped running in December 1952, a few months after the Chesapeake Bay Bridge was built.

Claude W. Somers was listed on the National Register of Historic Places in 1985.

== Connecting passenger train service east ==
As late as 1924 the Baltimore, Chesapeake and Atlantic Railway was operating daily except Sunday passenger trains east from Claiborne to various points on the DelMarVa peninsula: Easton, Hurlock, Salisbury's Union Station, Berlin and finally, Ocean City, Maryland. In 1924 the service was changed from a steam-powered locomotive to a gasoline-powered rail car. However, by 1928 that railroad company's successor, Baltimore and Eastern Railroad had dropped passenger train service from Claiborne. Nonetheless, travelers at that time could get train connections in Easton: the B&ER was still running Love Point - Easton - Ocean City trains. This service had ended by 1938.

== Pictures ==
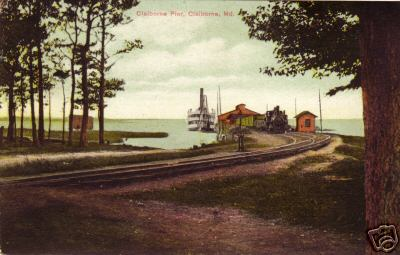
