= Stoopley Gibson Manor =

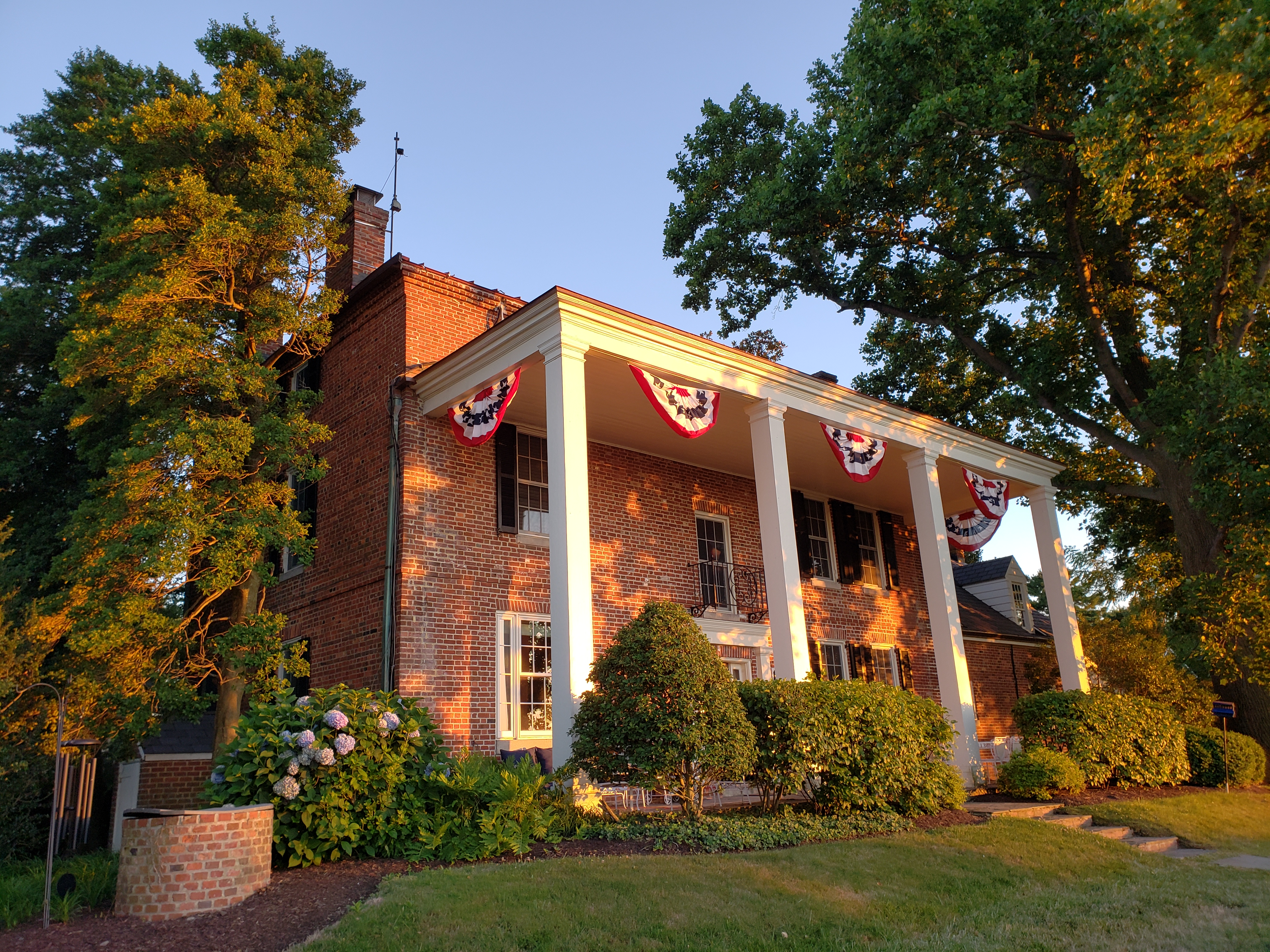
- Current view from the Chester River

- Location within Maryland Location within the United States
- 38°58′51.5″N 76°16′32.9″W
- Type: Manor house
- Location: Kent Island, Maryland

History
- Built: 1760
- Built by: Francis Bright

Site notes
- Area: 200 acres (81 ha)
- Architectural style: Georgian
- Governing body: Private

The historic Stoopley-Gibson Manor is a stately three-story, 18th-century Georgian brick manor home along the Chester River on the north shore of Kent Island in Maryland. The original 150 acres (61 ha) land patent was first issued to Henry Stoupe and John Gibson in 1656. According to the local tax assessment, the property had increased to 176 acres (71 ha) by 1798 with the initial reference to the building structure. The manor was enlarged in the mid-19th century, with secondary restorations and expansions in the 20th and 21st centuries. Of particular note is the original header bond brick on the south façade, common in period Annapolis and Chestertown homes and two-story north-facing veranda reminiscent of Mount Vernon. Significant local history includes fugitive slave, Henry Massey, who escaped from the home in 1854, and the multi-generation family cemetery that was lost to shoreline erosion.<

== Henry Stoupe and John Gibson (1656–1730) ==
The extant property of the Stoopley Gibson manor was part of a land grant made on November 12, 1656, to two "partners and mates", Henry Stoupe and John Gibson. They expanded the 150 acres (61 ha) lot with the purchase of an additional 100 acres (40 ha) from John Winchester in 1657. Half of the property was then sold to Andrew Helena (Elinor) by the end of 1658, who died in 1660, passing the land to his wife who remarried multiple times. By 1694, the land had passed to Elinor's two daughters, being jointly held by their husbands William Joyner and Lawrence Arnold. There are no known records of the property from 1694 until it was re-surveyed in 1730.

== The Bright Family (1730–1868) ==
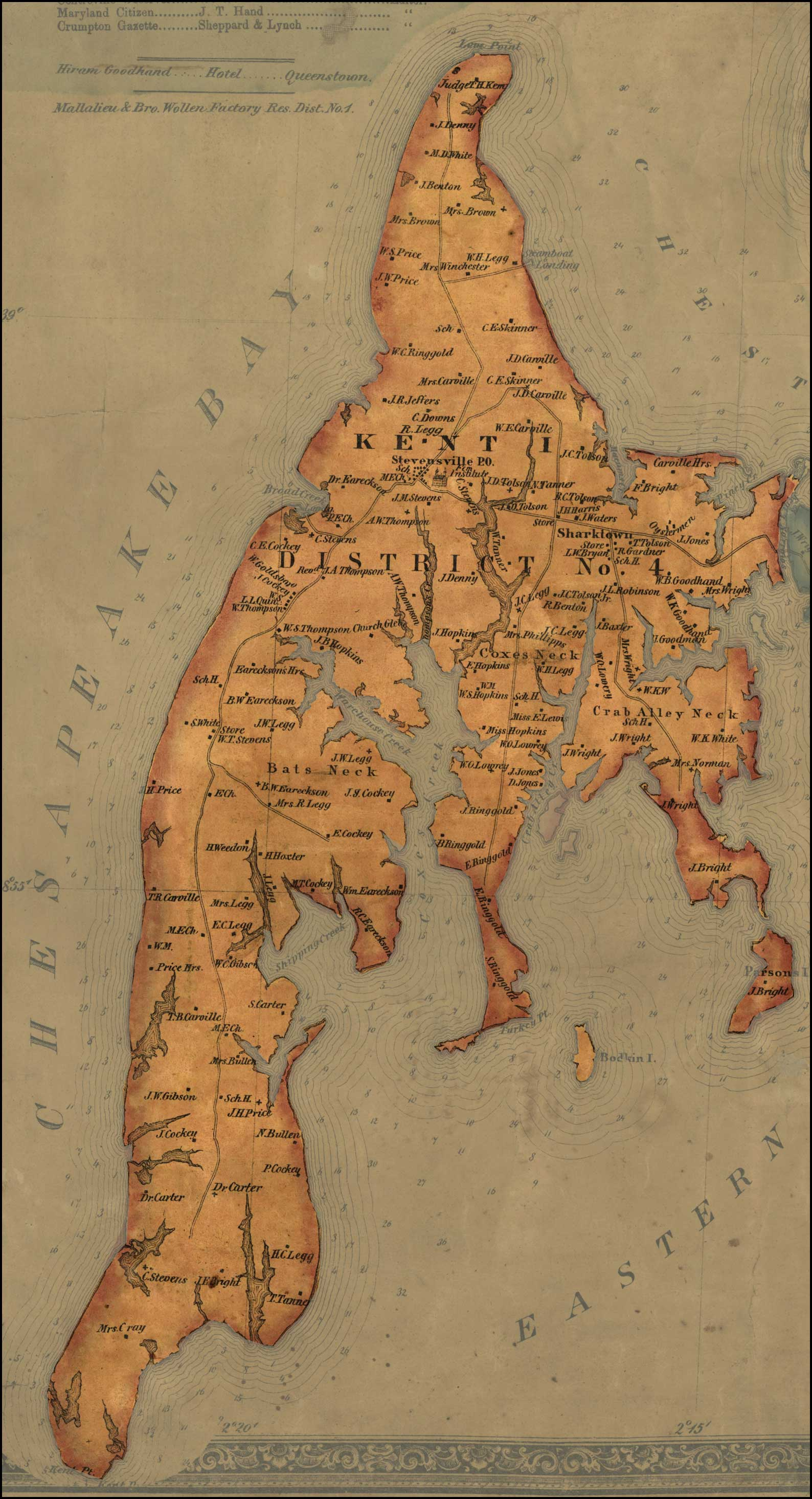
Map of Kent Island showing Franklin Bright's ownership in 1866, shortly before selling it to the White family in 1868.

While ownership of the property remains unclear through the early 18th century, the property of 200 acres was surveyed and patented for Francis Bright in 1730. The first written evidence of the manor home was on the 1798 Federal Direct Tax which described "a dwelling valued at $600, (~$14,423 in 2024) a barn, and a corn house."

The home and plantation passed through successive generations of Bright farmers in the years between the American Revolution and the American Civil War and remained a prototypical example of an 18th- and 19th-century mid-Atlantic farm. Census records document numerous slaves who lived on the property, including Henry Massey, who escaped from the property and was apprehended in Harrisburg, Pennsylvania and returned to Franklin Bright in September 1854. Massey's escape has been listed on the U.S. National Park Service Network to Freedom.

Franklin represented the last generation of Bright family owners when, at the age of 41, he died in 1865 intestate and without any evidence of offspring. There is some speculation given his ownership of slaves and dependency on the local agricultural economy, he may have joined the Confederate Army and was killed during the Civil War, but no contemporary records have validated this account.

== White's Heritage (1868–1933) ==
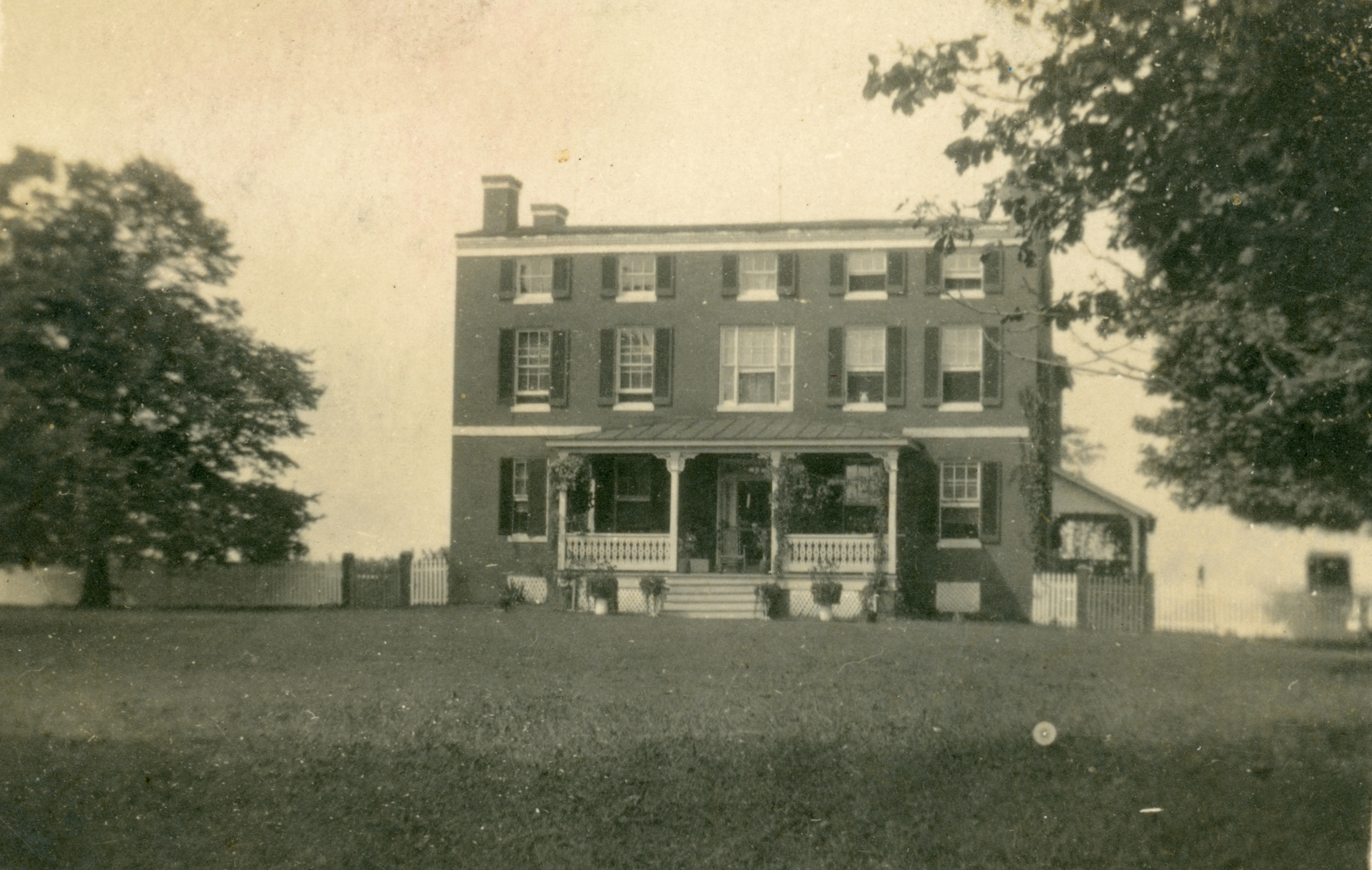
Postcard photograph postmarked in 1907

After the Civil War and Bright's death, the manor was purchased by Marmaduke White, a local farmer who owned property to the northwest of the Stoopley Gibson property. In 1880, a local Chancery Court disposition described the property improved by "a two story brick house with attic, with a frame back building and all the necessary outbuildings." The property remained in the White family as a farming plantation into the second quarter of the 20th century.

== Benjamin F. and Gertrude McGuckin (1933–1950) ==
Stoopley Gibson was purchased by B. F. McGuckin, a prominent partner at the New York firm of De Coppet and Doremus and former General Motors board member, and his wife Gertrude in November 1933. The transaction involved several heirs to the White family, including T. Walter White, the tenant farmer for the 159 acres (64 ha) property. The purchase was delayed by disputes among the White heirs that were resolved by the Circuit Court for Queen Anne's County by March 14, 1934, when the property settled for $15,000 (~$274,373 in 2024).

Within the first few months of ownership, the McGuckins initiated an extensive restoration of the manor house and property, which was described at the time as "one of the fine waterfront properties of the county." Renovations included the addition of a wing to the west of the manor home with a new kitchen, laundry room, mud room, and maids' dining room, the construction of a detached garage, greenhouse, and swimming pool. The McGuckins were able to take possession of the home and relocate from New York by June 20, 1935.

== Elm Street Development and Gibson's Grant (2000–present) ==
The property was sold to White's Heritage Partners in 2000 and was subdivided under the name Gibson's Grant. The last living owner prior to the development of the neighborhood, Luther Gregory, died in 2006.

The home was featured on the 2019 Maryland Home and Garden Pilgrimage.
