= Broad Creek, Maryland =

Coordinates: 38°58′27″N 76°19′45″W

Broad Creek was a town on western Kent Island, Maryland that existed from the 17th century to the 19th century. The town once served as the eastern terminus of a trans-Chesapeake Bay ferry line that was part of an early route between Annapolis and Philadelphia.

In the mid 19th century, with the rise of steamboat travel, much of Kent Island's activity shifted to the towns of Stevensville, Chester, and Dominion, and in 1880, Christ Church, the main congregation on the island, moved to Stevensville, cementing the new town's position as Kent Island's main center of activity. Today, the area once occupied by Broad Creek is widely considered part of Stevensville. All that remains of the town today is the Broad Creek Cemetery and Christ Church, which are being restored.

== See also ==
- List of ghost towns in Maryland
