= Ozinie =

Native American people

Ozinie Wicomiss
Total population
- Extinct as a tribe

Regions with significant populations
- Maryland

Languages
- Eastern Algonquian

Religion
- Native American religion

Related ethnic groups
- Nanticoke

The Ozinie, also known as the Wicomiss, were a group of Native Americans living near modern-day Rock Hall, in Kent County, Maryland. They were hunter-gatherers and fished.

== Territory ==
At the time of the arrival of English settlers in the 1630s, they lived in a village near Chester River that flowed in the Chesapeake Bay. Dr. Jon Seidel recently speculated Indiantown Farm in modern-day Queen Anne's County as a possible location of the village. The Ozinie may have used Eastern Neck Island for shellfishing.

== Population ==
They had an estimated population of 255 people.

== Language ==
The Ozinie spoke an Algonquian language and were related to the Nanticoke, another Algonquian-speaking tribe,

== 17th-century history ==
Captain John Smith encountered the Ozinie in 1608. In his monograph, Talbot County: A History, Dickson J. Preston locates a "fortified village" of the Ozinie, "south of the Chester River in present Queen Anne's County" that was encountered by English settlers in the 1630s. The Ozinie at that time were frequently at odds with the Susquehannocks, and English settlers would go on to pit the different tribes of the Eastern Shore against the Ozinie as part of a strategy to eradicate their presence, as the Ozinie were among the most hostile of the region's tribes to English settlers and made it clear that they rejected English presence, laws and customs.

Military extermination campaigns and settler incursions further scattered the Ozinie population over the following decades. Ozinie Indians themselves encountered a legal apartheid system, where incidents such as the murder of Ozinie Indians by English settlers would go unpunished, while violence by Ozinie Indians against English settlers were dealt with in colonial courts. In 1667, tensions came to a head, according to Talbot County historian Dickson J. Preston:

"In 1667 Captain James Odber, military commander of the district, and his servant were murdered, allegedly by Wicomesses [Ozinie] Indians. That produced demands for vengeance from white settlers throughout the Eastern Shore. The settlers enlisted the help of the other tribes and sent out an expedition which wiped out the entire nation, to that the last man, woman, and child, in what may have ben America's first genocidal war.

According to Preston, the assistance of the Nanticokes in this campaign was negotiated in return for hunting and fishing rights. The campaign recruited men from a proportion of settler families in the area:

A colonial expedition with Major Thomas Ingram of Talbot County as field commander was quickly organized. He was authorized to raise an army of 400 men, including 60 from Talbot, by drafting every tenth able-bodied man in the province. Each man was to supply his own clothing, gun, sword, powder, shot, and flints, and every sixth man was to bring along an axe. Details of the war that followed have been lost, but it was certainly a great success from the whites' point of view. Philemon Lloyd, colonel of the Talbot militia who took part, later reported with grim satisfaction that it had "been brought to an end by the defeat and total destruction of a nation of savages called the Wicomesses." As nearly as can be determined, not a single man, woman, or child, was left alive.

Other sources argue that Ozinie assimilated with the neighboring Nanticokes by the 1660s.
