= Bay Bridge Airport =

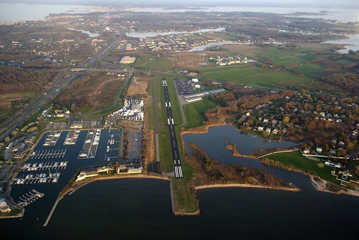
- Bay Bridge Airport
- IATA: none; ICAO: none; FAA LID: W29

Summary
- Airport type: Public
- Owner: Queen Anne's County
- Location: Stevensville, Maryland
- Elevation AMSL: 15 ft (4.6 m)
- Coordinates: 38°58′35″N 076°19′47″W

Map
- Location of airport in Maryland W29 (the United States)

Runways
Direction	Length		Surface
Direction	ft	m	Surface
11/29	2,714	827	Asphalt

Statistics (2023)
- Aircraft operations (year ending 7/7/2023): 35,280
- Based aircraft: 78
- Source: Federal Aviation Administration

Bay Bridge Airport (FAA LID: W29) is a county-owned public-use airport located in Stevensville, Maryland. The airport is named for the nearby Chesapeake Bay Bridge and is mostly used for general aviation.

Bay Bridge Airport was home to Lynn Aviation, the personal company of famed aerobatic pilot Nancy Lynn.

== Facilities and aircraft ==
Bay Bridge Airport covers an area of 72 acres (29 ha) and contains one asphalt runway (11/29) measuring 2,714 x 60 ft (827 x 18 m). For the 12-month period ending July 7, 2023, the airport had 35,280 aircraft operations, an average of 97 per day: 99% general aviation and <1% air taxi. There was 78 aircraft based at this airport: 66 single-engine, five multi-engine, and seven helicopter.

== Flight schools ==
One resident of Bay Bridge Airport is Trident Aircraft, a flight school that caters to all pilots. Trident Aircraft currently trains midshipmen from the nearby U.S. Naval Academy to prepare them for further training at the Pensacola Naval Air Station. The school took over this position from former Bay Bridge resident school Chesapeake ProFlight, when ProFlight ceased operations in November 2008 after failing to secure investors following the 2008 US Financial Crisis. The flight school employs multiple flight instructors and boasts a rental fleet of fixed-gear Cessna aircraft, a Piper Arrow, a twin-engine Beechcraft Duchess, a Super Decathlon for aerobatic and tailwheel training, and at least one Cirrus aircraft. Trident provides primary instruction through ATP, and is an authorized Cirrus training center.

Also operating out of Bay Bridge airport is Chesapeake Sport Pilot, which provides light sport instruction and light sport aircraft rental. The current fleet includes Tecnam Sierra, Tecnam Eaglet, Remos GX, Flight Design CT, and Sky Arrow aircraft.

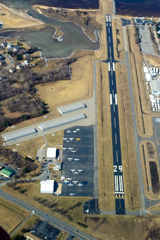
Bay Bridge Airport

== See also ==
- List of airports in Maryland
