= Eastern Bay =

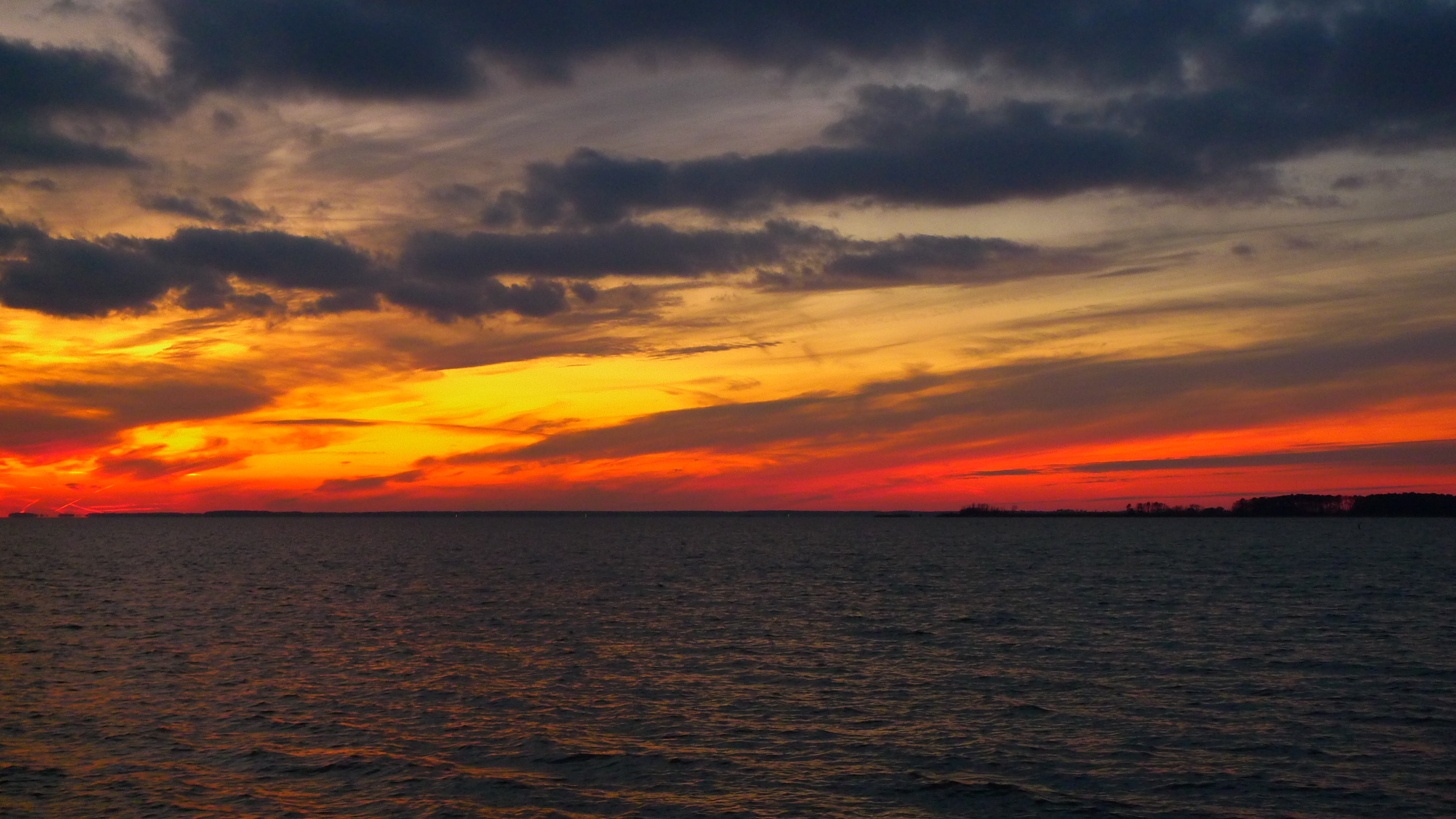
- Sunset over the Eastern Bay

- Location within Maryland Location within the United States
- Coordinates: 38°52′47″N 76°16′11″W
- Type: Bay
- Surface elevation: 0 feet (0 m)

The Eastern Bay is a tributary of the Chesapeake Bay located between Queen Anne's County, Maryland and Talbot County, Maryland on the Eastern Shore. Its main tributaries include the Miles River and the Wye River. It is located south of the Chester River and north of the Choptank River and is connected to the Chester River via Kent Narrows.

A ferry across the Eastern Bay run by the Claiborne-Annapolis Ferry Company used to connect the communities of Romancoke and Claiborne until December 31, 1952.
