= Normans, Maryland =

Unincorporated community in Maryland, United States

- Unincorporated community
- Location within Maryland
- Coordinates: 38°56′29″N 76°21′08″W
- Country: United States
- State: Maryland
- County: Queen Anne's
- Elevation: 16 ft (4.9 m)
- Time zone: UTC-5 (Eastern (EST))
  - Summer (DST): UTC-4 (EDT)
- Area codes: 410 & 443
- GNIS feature ID: 597810

Normans is an unincorporated community in Queen Anne's County, Maryland, United States. Normans is located near Maryland Route 8, 3.4 miles (5.5 km) southwest of Stevensville.
