= Matapeake people =

Matapeake
Total population
- Extinct as a tribe

Regions with significant populations
- Maryland

Languages
- Eastern Algonquian

Religion
- Native American religion

Related ethnic groups
- Nanticoke

The Matapeake (also known as the Monoponson) were an Indigenous Algonquian people who lived on Kent Island, which they referred to as Monoponson in their language. The Matapeake, along with the Choptank, Lenape, and Nanticoke, were the four most prominent Algonquian tribes living in Maryland.

== Population ==
In the 1600s, the tribe only had around 100 members living on Kent Island. Their chief village was on the southeast side of the island.

== History ==
English colonizers led by William Claiborne founded Kent Fort in 1631. Claiborne made Kent Fort into a trading post with the Matapeake people, the Indigenous tribe of the island. Beads imported from Italy were given to the Matapeake people in exchange for furs.

Due to the increasing population of European settlers on Kent Island during the late 1600s and early 1700s, the Matapeake people were forced to leave the island and join neighboring Algonquian tribes. The Matapeake people referred to Kent Island as Monoponson in their language.

== See also ==
- Native American tribes in Maryland
