= Claiborne–Annapolis Ferry Company =

The Claiborne–Annapolis Ferry Company ran both passenger and automobile ferry service across the Chesapeake Bay from 1919 to 1952. The initial service was between Annapolis, Maryland, on the western shore and Claiborne, Maryland, on the eastern shore. In July 1930, a second shorter route was added between Annapolis, Maryland, and Matapeake on Kent Island, Maryland. Business increased so rapidly at that point that another ferryboat was added. In May, 1938 the Claiborne route was changed to run from Claiborne to Romancoke, Maryland, on the lower end of Kent Island, from which passengers could then connect to the Matapeake to Annapolis run. In 1943, the Annapolis United States Naval Academy absorbed the property where the ferry terminal had been, so service was switched from Annapolis to a new terminal at Sandy Point on the western shore. By May 1951, the ferries were handling 1 million vehicles and 2 million passengers annually. Ferry service stopped running in 1952 when the Chesapeake Bay Bridge was completed.

== History ==
The first Claiborne-Annapolis ferry was operated by the Eastern Shore Development Steamship Company from 1912 to 1916, until it entered liquidation and ceased operations.

The first run by the Claiborne–Annapolis Ferry Company (under its earlier name Claiborne-Annapolis Ferry, Inc.) was June 19, 1919, with the sidewheeler Gov. Emerson C. Harrington, named for the 48th Governor of Maryland and later President of the Claiborne–Annapolis Ferry Company. As governor, Harrington had been instrumental in getting the ferry started. In 1915, the State Roads Commission had appropriated $50,000 to establish a state-owned ferry. With the beginning of World War I, planning was put on hold until 1919. At that time a group of businessmen headed by Hampden D. Mepham, originally from St. Louis but then living in New York City, and Frank McNamee, of Albany, and at the urging of Gov. Harrington, formed a private company named the Claiborne-Annapolis Ferry, Inc. The state funds were instead diverted toward subsidizing the new private company. The "Old Harrington", as the boat became known, made two round trips daily, crossing the Chesapeake Bay in 1 hour 20 minutes.

In 1921, the company struggling financially, but Gov. Harrington, his term as Governor over, became President of the company and instituted reforms to make it more profitable. Not until 1924 did the company begin to see receipts exceed expenses, in part because the competing Baltimore, Chesapeake & Atlantic Railway ferry from Baltimore to Claiborne ceased operations. In 1921, a bus route was added to carry passengers to Easton, Hurlock, and Cambridge. In 1928 the assets of the company was acquired by a new company established for that purpose, the Claiborne–Annapolis Ferry Company.

The Gov. Emerson C. Harrington was retired in 1937 and replaced by the Gov. Emerson C. Harrington II, a double-ender with a coal-fired steam engine, until it was converted to diesel power in 1944/45. Other boats were to include the General Lincoln (1920-1922), Majestic (1923-1927), Gov. Albert C. Ritchie (1926-1944), John M. Dennis (1929-1952), Gov. Harry W. Nice (1938-1952), Gov. Herbert R. O'Conor (1948-1952), and the B. Frank Sherman (1949-1952), the last named for the company's General Manager from 1924-1952. The last two boats, technically, were never part of the Claiborne Annapolis Ferry Company and never served either Claiborne or Annapolis itself. Instead they operated exclusively on the Sandy Point-Matapeake route.

Serious discussion about building a bridge across the Chesapeake Bay had been around since at least 1907, but did not take hold until the 1930s. Since the bridge would put the ferry out of business, the State decided it had an obligation to the ferry owners to purchase the company. In 1941, the company was purchased for $1,023,000 by the Maryland State Roads Commission (now the Maryland State Highway Administration), and was renamed the Chesapeake Bay Ferry System.

At the time the company was purchased by the State Roads Commission, it had approximately 120 employees.

Service on the ferry was continued across the Chesapeake Bay until July 30, 1952, the same day the new Chesapeake Bay Bridge was opened. During a final run by the John M. Dennis a few weeks before the bridge opening, it "accidentally" rammed the new bridge [Variations on the cause of the "accident" can be found between newspaper accounts and recollections by family members of the ship's Captain Edward C. Higgins]. The last run from Claiborne to Romancoke was on December 31, 1952, by the Gov. Emerson C. Harrington II.

== Ferries ==
Ferry	Notes	Photos
Gov. Emerson C. Harrington	Built in 1901. 201-foot. sidewheeler. Originally named the Thomas Patten and in service in New York Harbor. Capacity: 42 vehicles. 1000 passengers. Bought in 1919, renamed the Gov. Emerson C. Harrington and placed in service on 19 Jun 1919, under Capt. Thomas Mann. Sold in 1938 to C. K. Duncan, who brought the vessel to Pocomoke City, Maryland, and made it into a floating restaurant, nightclub and hotel. In 1949, the superstructure was stripped off and her furnishings purchased by the VFW for their new post home. The vessel was brought to a Baltimore scrap yard.	Photo link: At dock in Claiborne alongside the Cambridge owned by the competing Baltimore, Chesapeake, and Atlantic railway) As a restaurant in Pocomoke
General Lincoln	Built in 1878. 161 feet. Originally named the Nahant. Renamed General Lincoln in 1884. Capacity: 13 vehicles Bought in 1920 and placed in service on 20 Jul 1920, under Capt. Thomas Woolford. Sold in 1923-1924, and renamed the Indian Head Later renamed Mayflower.	
Majestic	Built in 1903. 201 feet. 717 gross ton. Side-wheeler. Originally named the Happy Day. Bought in 1923 and had its superstructure altered to accommodate more vehicles. Capacity: 35 vehicles Scheduled for sale in 1927 but sunk in Baltimore harbor in the summer of 1927. Later raised and converted into a barge.	Photo link
Gov. Albert C. Ritchie	Built in 1883/1884. 194 feet. Originally named the Newburgh and built for the West Shore and Ontario Terminal Company (later acquired by the New York Central System and reincorporated as the West Shore Railroad Company). Taken out of service in 1911, it was later purchased in 1916 by Erie's Pavonia Ferry Company and then sold again in 1924 and renamed the Albert C. Ritchie. Wooden hulled. Modified in 1926 in Staten Island, NY with diesel engines and as a double-ender which could also accommodate cars. Six lanes across. Capacity: 75-80 vehicles and 1200 passengers. Placed in service on July 22, 1926. Condemned as unfit for service following a federal inspection in early 1944. Sold in 1944 to Marine Industries, Ltd and most probably scrapped in 1945 in Sorel-Tracy, Quebec, Canada.	Photo link
John M. Dennis	Built in 1929 by Spear Engineers, Inc. of Portsmouth, VA. 215 feet. Six lanes across. Diesel. Capacity: 65 vehicles; 880 passengers. Placed in service on June 13, 1929.	Photo LInk: John M. Dennis breaking her way through ice on the bay in the 1930s.
Gov. Harry W. Nice	Keel laid September 15, 1937, at Maryland Drydock Co., launched December 11, 1937, and delivered April 30, 1938. Dimensions 208' x 62' x 9'. Six lanes across. Fairbanks, Morse and Company 8-cylinder direct-reversible 1,400 shp at 300 rpm with thrust bearings and flexible couplings at each end for double end drive driving 82 inch diameter/60 inch pitch bronze, three bladed propellers at each end; designed to withstand icebreaking. Capacity: 65 vehicles; 730 passengers; accommodation for crew of 22, staterooms for four officers. Placed in service on May 4, 1938, under Capt. Thomas Woolford. July 1938 detailed description with photos: "New Steel Motor Ferry Governor Harry W. Nice" Purchased by Washington State Ferries in 1951, for use on Puget Sound, and renamed the Olympic. Sold in 1997 to a private owner with the idea of turning it into a sightseeing vessel and museum. Nothing came of the idea and the boat was turned over to Seattle's Pacific Marine Foundation who sold it to a private owner in 2009/2010. It is currently moored at Ketron Island in Washington State.	Photo link
Gov. Emerson C. Harrington II	Built in 1913 at the Merrill-Stevens shipyard in Jacksonville, Florida. 130 feet. Double-ender powered by a coal-fired steam engine. Built as the South Jacksonville in 1913 at the Merrill-Stevens shipyard in Jacksonville Florida for the Jacksonville Ferry and Land Company. The double-ended ferryboat had a 40-foot beam. She was put into service on the Saint Johns River between downtown Jacksonville and South Jacksonville. A bridge (a ferryboats worst enemy) was built in 1921 and the boat was no longer needed. She was sold to the Tocony-Palmyra Ferry Company of Philadelphia and put into service on the Delaware River under the new name "Mount Holly". In 1927 the "Mount Holly" went to New York Harbor. Her new owners, the 34th Street Vehicular Ferry Company kept the name "Mount Holly" and put her into service on the East River between Long Island City and the foot of East 34th Street in Manhattan. The company failed in 1936 and she was purchased by the Claiborne-Annapolis Ferry Co. on May 5, 1938, at which time major rebuilding was done of the superstructure. Capacity: 32 vehicles; 256 passengers. In 1945, the original steam and coal-fired boilers were replaced with a pair of 6-cylinder diesel engines. In 1954 it was sold for service on Lake Champlain, run by the Lake Champlain Transportation Company and rechristened the Adirondack, to run between Burlington and Port Kent. As of 1999, it was the oldest double-ended ferry still in service in North America, and will celebrate its 100th anniversary on January 15, 2013.	Links to photos of the Adirondack: see "Adirondack"
Gov. Herbert R. O'Conor	Built in 1946 at the Maryland Drydock Co. as a steel double-ender. 218 feet. Diesel. Capacity: 75 vehicles; 894 passengers. Placed in service on February 22, 1947. Sold to the Washington State Ferries in 1954, for use on Puget Sound, and renamed Rhododendron. The ferry was retired on January 23, 2012.	Photo links:
Eastern Bay/B. Frank Sherman	Built 1926. 146 feet. Originally named the Frederick Peirce for Electric Ferries, Inc. Electric diesel. Capacity: 33 vehicles; 495 passengers. It was later sold to the US Government and renamed the Westchester (1931), then to the Port Richmond Ferry Co. and renamed the North Jersey (1947), to the Claiborne-Annapolis Ferry Co. as the Eastern Bay (1949), then renamed the B. Frank Sherman (1951), then sold and renamed the Chesapeake (1955), and finally scrapped in 1979.	

Other miscellaneous photographs
