= Love Point, Maryland =

Northernmost tip of Kent Island, Maryland, United States

Coordinates: 39°01′55″N 76°18′41″W

Love Point is the name for the northernmost tip of Kent Island, Maryland, United States. As such, it marks the southern point of the mouth of the Chester River. It has served as a major ferry terminal, the western terminus of the Queen Anne's Railroad, and the nominal western terminus of Maryland Route 18 (which is aligned in a north–south direction near Love Point). Two notable landmarks once stood at the Love Point area; the Love Point Light and Hotel Love Point, both of which are destroyed. Today, Love Point is primarily a residential area.

== Etymology ==
Love Point's name dates back to at least 1694 and is often explained in local legends. Most of these legends are variations of the same basic story where two lovers die either at Love Point or in the nearby waters. Depending on the specific variation, the lovers are either Native American, European settlers, or one of each. In many versions of the story the couple's love is forbidden, and this is what leads to their death. Another element present in some versions is that their bodies are found washed ashore in an embracing position.

An unrelated explanation states that sailors going up the Chester River had to luff their sails as they rounded Love Point due to a strong northwesterly wind. According to this explanation, the point came to be known as "Luff Point" and over the years the name changed to "Love Point".
