= Romancoke, Maryland =

Romancoke
- Census-designated place
- Location within the state of Maryland Romancoke (the United States)
- Coordinates: 38°52′52″N 76°20′11″W
- Country: United States of America
- State: Maryland
- County: Queen Anne's

Area
  - Total: 1.92 sq mi (4.96 km^{2})
  - Land: 1.27 sq mi (3.29 km^{2})
  - Water: 0.64 sq mi (1.67 km^{2})

Population (2020)
  - Total: 1,855
  - Density: 1,461.9/sq mi (564.43/km^{2})
- Time zone: UTC-5 (Eastern (EST))
  - Summer (DST): UTC-4 (EDT)
- FIPS code: 24-68265

Romancoke is a census-designated place on Queen Anne's in Maryland, United States, located at the southern terminus of Maryland Route 8. Romancoke was changed from an unincorporated community to a census-designated place for the 2020 Census listing a population of 1,855. The name "Romancoke" comes from the Algonquian word for "circling of the water." William Claiborne, who founded Kent Island, also had a plantation in Virginia named Romancoke.

Romancoke was once linked with Claiborne via the Romancoke-Claiborne ferry; however, the ferry service terminated on December 31, 1952. This was five months after the Chesapeake Bay Bridge was opened. Today, Romancoke is almost purely residential and is part of Stevensville's postal area.

== Demographics ==
Historical population
Census	Pop.	Note	%±
2020	1,855		—
U.S. Decennial Census; 2020

Romancoke first appeared as a census designated place in the 2020 U.S. census.

=== 2020 census ===
As of the 2020 census, Romancoke had a population of 1,855. The median age was 47.9 years. 19.9% of residents were under the age of 18 and 20.5% of residents were 65 years of age or older. For every 100 females there were 101.0 males, and for every 100 females age 18 and over there were 106.8 males age 18 and over.

100.0% of residents lived in urban areas, while 0.0% lived in rural areas.

There were 720 households in Romancoke, of which 29.3% had children under the age of 18 living in them. Of all households, 62.8% were married-couple households, 15.3% were households with a male householder and no spouse or partner present, and 15.3% were households with a female householder and no spouse or partner present. About 20.0% of all households were made up of individuals and 9.8% had someone living alone who was 65 years of age or older.

There were 785 housing units, of which 8.3% were vacant. The homeowner vacancy rate was 1.6% and the rental vacancy rate was 11.3%.

Romancoke CDP, Maryland - Demographic Profile (NH = Non-Hispanic)
Race / Ethnicity	Pop 2020	% 2020
White alone (NH)	1,692	91.21%
Black or African American alone (NH)	17	0.92%
Native American or Alaska Native alone (NH)	5	0.27%
Asian alone (NH)	21	1.13%
Pacific Islander alone (NH)	0	0.00%
Some Other Race alone (NH)	5	0.27%
Mixed Race/Multi-Racial (NH)	75	4.04%
Hispanic or Latino (any race)	40	2.16%
Total	1,855	100.00%

Note: the US Census treats Hispanic/Latino as an ethnic category. This table excludes Latinos from the racial categories and assigns them to a separate category. Hispanics/Latinos can be of any race.
