= Matapeake, Maryland =

Unincorporated community in Maryland, U.S.

Coordinates: 38°57′41″N 76°20′36″W

Matapeake is an unincorporated community located south of Stevensville on Kent Island, Maryland, United States.

It is named for the historic Matapeake tribe, who lived there at the time of English colonization in 1631. Their chief village was on the southeast side of the island. They were an Algonquian-speaking tribe, who were members of a confederacy led by the Nanticoke.

Before construction of the Chesapeake Bay Bridge, Matapeake was the eastern terminus of a cross-bay ferry. The ferry building is part of the Matapeake Maritime Center.

Today, Matapeake is home to Matapeake State Park, Christ Episcopal Church of Kent Island, Matapeake Elementary School, and Matapeake Middle School.
