= Chesapeake Bay Bridge =

Bridge in Maryland, U.S., spanning the Chesapeake Bay

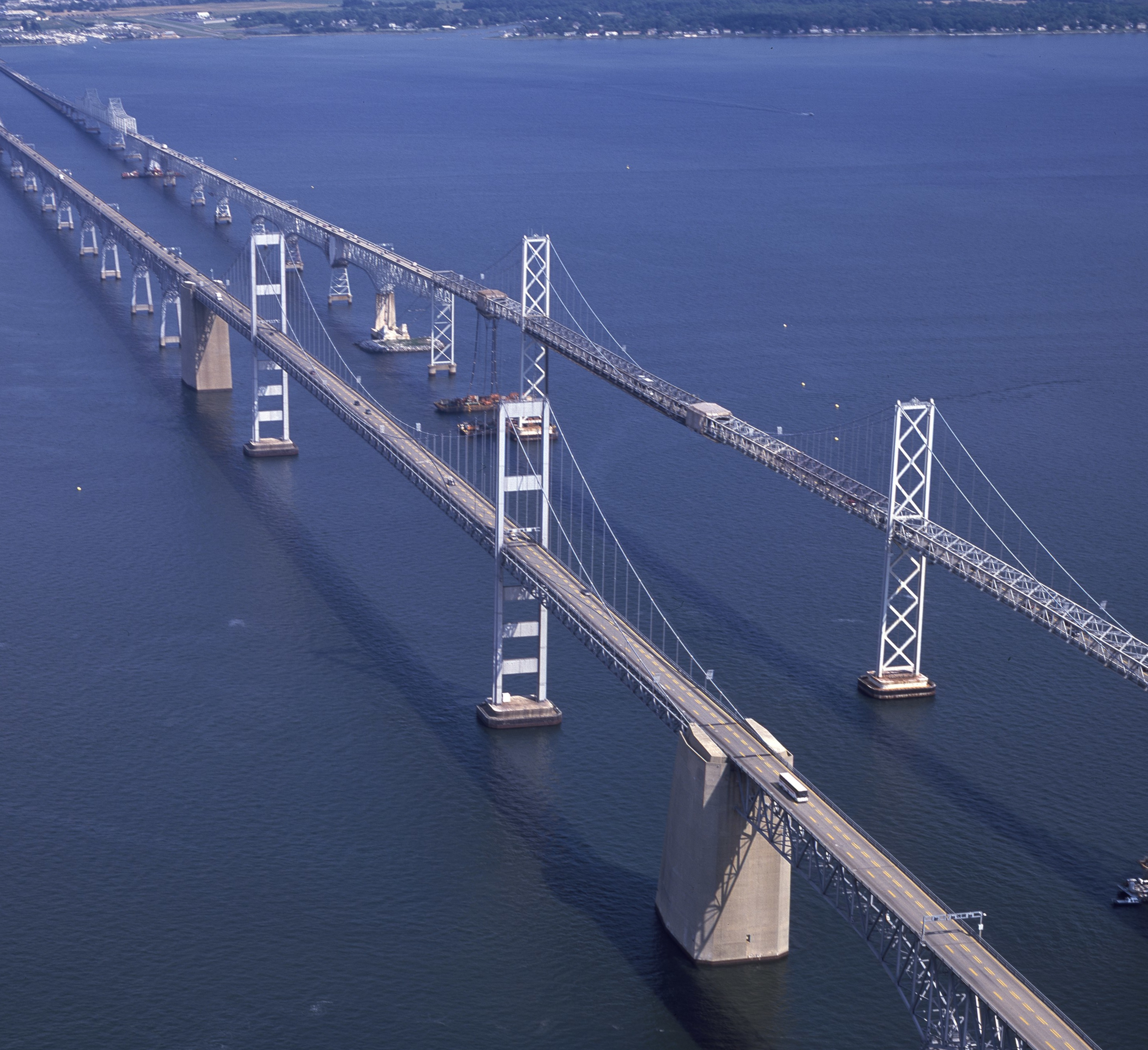
- Both spans of the Chesapeake Bay Bridge
- Coordinates: 38°59′30″N 76°22′20″W
- Carries: 5 lanes of US 50 / US 301
- Crosses: Chesapeake Bay
- Locale: Anne Arundel and Queen Anne's Counties, Maryland
- Official name: Gov. William Preston Lane Jr. Memorial Bridge
- Other name: "Bay Bridge"
- Maintained by: Maryland Transportation Authority, State of Maryland
- ID number: AAZ050
- Website: baybridge.maryland.gov

Characteristics
- Design: Cantilever bridge (eastbound), Continuous truss bridge (westbound), and Suspension bridges (both spans)
- Material: Steel, concrete
- Total length: 21,273 ft (6,484.0 m) (eastbound); 21,047 ft (6,415.1 m) (westbound)
- Width: 28 ft (8.5 m) (eastbound); 38 ft (11.6 m) (westbound)
- Height: 354 ft (107.9 m) (eastbound); 379 ft (115.5 m) (westbound)
- Longest span: 1,600 ft (488 m)
- Clearance below: 186 ft (56.7 m)

History
- Opened: July 30, 1952 (eastbound); June 28, 1973 (westbound)

Statistics
- Daily traffic: 61,000
- Toll: $6.00 (eastbound only) $4.00 with EZPass Transponder

Location
- Interactive map of Chesapeake Bay Bridge

The Gov. William Preston Lane Jr. Memorial Bridge (informally called the Chesapeake Bay Bridge and, locally, the Bay Bridge) is a major dual-span bridge in the U.S. state of Maryland. Spanning the Chesapeake Bay, it connects the state's rural Eastern Shore region with its urban and suburban Western Shore, running between Stevensville and Sandy Point State Park near the capital city of Annapolis. The original span, opened in 1952 and with a length of 4 miles (6.4 km), was the world's longest continuous over-water steel structure. The parallel span was added in 1973. The bridge is named for William Preston Lane Jr., who, as the 52nd Governor of Maryland, launched its construction in the late 1940s after decades of political indecision and public controversy.

The bridge is part of U.S. Route 50 (US 50) and U.S. Route 301 (US 301), and serves as a vital link in both routes. As part of cross-country US 50, it connects the Baltimore–Washington Metropolitan Area with Ocean City, Maryland, Rehoboth Beach, Delaware, and other coastal tourist destinations. As part of US 301, it serves as part of an alternative route for Interstate 95 travelers, between northern Delaware and the Washington, D.C., area. The bridge is busy and often congested with traffic, particularly during peak hours and summer months.

The bridge's role in transportation was filled by ferries before the first span's construction. The bridge has fostered the state's economic growth, particularly of Queen Anne's County and Ocean City. Further expansion of the bridge has been discussed since 2004, with a task force being formed to investigate the possibility of building a third span.

== History ==
=== Proposals and ferries ===
It is possible that studies may have been conducted as early as the 1880s into the possibility of a bridge across the Chesapeake Bay. However, the first known proposal came about in 1907 and called for a crossing between Baltimore and Tolchester Beach. In 1927, local businesspeople were authorized to finance the construction of a Baltimore to Tolchester Beach crossing. Plans for the new bridge were made, but construction was canceled following the Wall Street Crash of 1929 with the collapse of the American economy and resulting Great Depression of the 1930s.

Ferries were used as the main mode of transportation across the bay from the colonial period until the completion of the 1952 bridge. The first service ran from Annapolis to Broad Creek on Kent Island, roughly where the bridge is today. In 1919, the Claiborne–Annapolis Ferry Company began running ferries between Annapolis and Claiborne, a community near St. Michaels.

In July 1930, the Claiborne–Annapolis Ferry Company added a new route, one running from Annapolis to Matapeake, a significantly shorter distance. The auto and passenger ferries were taken over by the State Roads Commission in 1941 (reorganized into today's State Highway Administration of the Maryland Department of Transportation in 1973). Two years later, the commission moved the western terminus of the old Annapolis–Matapeake ferry to Sandy Point (later adjacent to Sandy Point State Park), shortening the cross-bay trip.

=== Construction of 1952 span ===
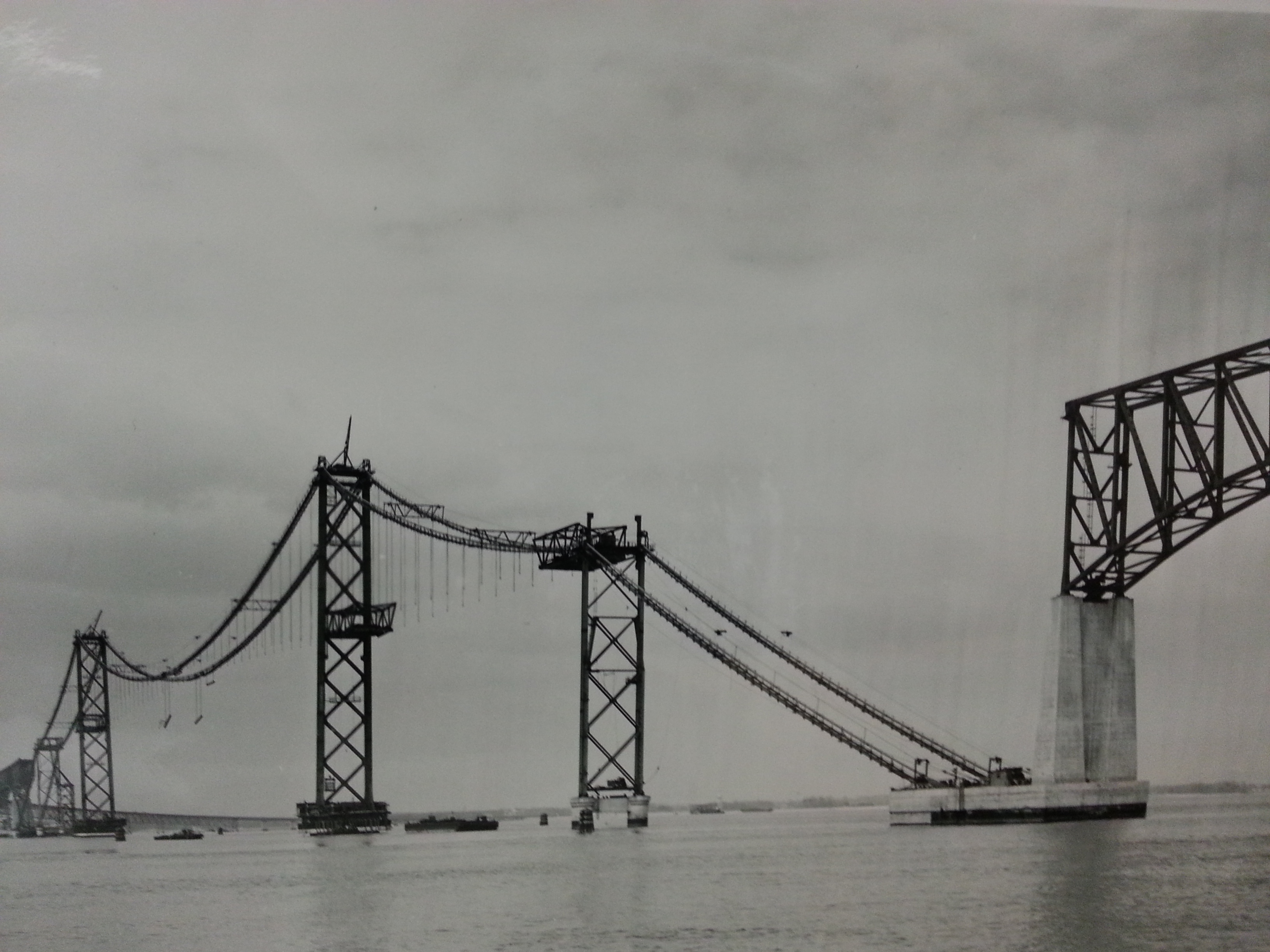
Construction of the eastbound span, April 1952

A 1938 proposal by the Maryland General Assembly was the first to call for a bridge at the Sandy Point–Kent Island location. Although the legislation authorizing the new bridge passed, the involvement of the United States in World War II delayed the bridge's construction. In 1947, with the war over, the Assembly, under the leadership of Maryland Governor William Preston Lane Jr., (1892–1967), passed legislation directing the old State Roads Commission to begin construction. Ground was broken in January 1949, and after a 3 1/2-year construction project, the bridge opened to traffic on July 30, 1952, as both the longest continuous over-water steel structure, and the third longest bridge in the world. Before the opening, a parade of vehicles made the first official crossing, led by then current Governor Theodore Roosevelt McKeldin, (1900–1974), and other state officials in a distinctive white Cadillac convertible flying huge American and Maryland flags. On November 9, 1967, the bridge was dedicated to Governor Lane, who had died earlier that year, and officially renamed the "William Preston Lane Jr. Memorial Bridge".

=== 1973 expansion and later construction ===
In 1967, due to increasing traffic volume, the Maryland General Assembly authorized three possible new crossings, all suggested during the 1964 Chesapeake Bay crossing study. These included one further north near Baltimore, one in southern Maryland, and an additional span to be added to the existing bridge from Kent Island to Sandy Point; ultimately, the third option was chosen. Construction of the new parallel span began in 1969 to the north of the original bridge, and it was completed on June 28, 1973.

From 1986 to 1988, the eastbound Chesapeake Bay Bridge had its deck replaced. This resulted in all traffic temporarily using the westbound span.

From 2006 to 2010, the westbound Chesapeake Bay Bridge had its deck replaced.

=== Notable incidents ===
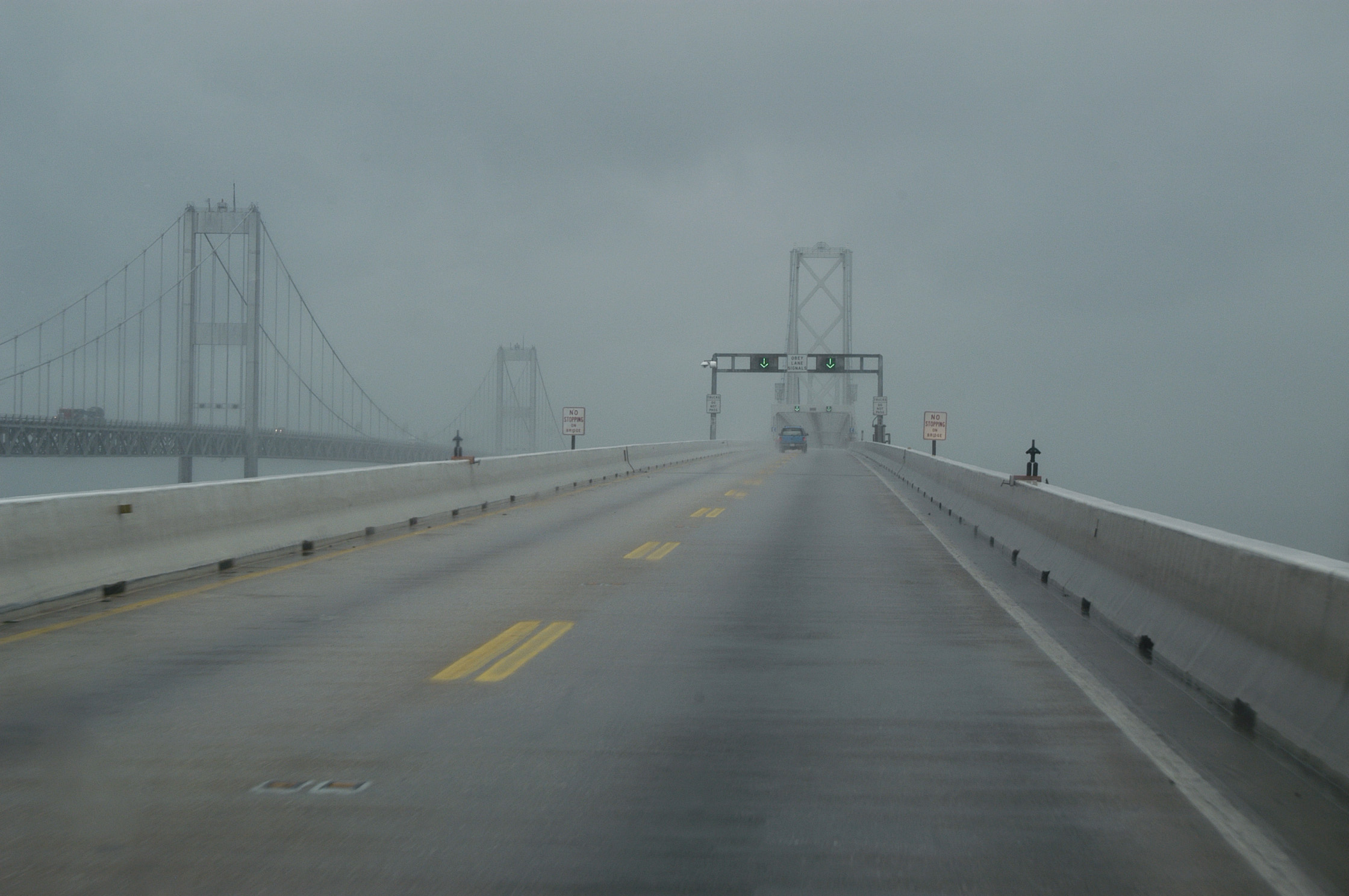
The Bay Bridge during 2003's Hurricane Isabel

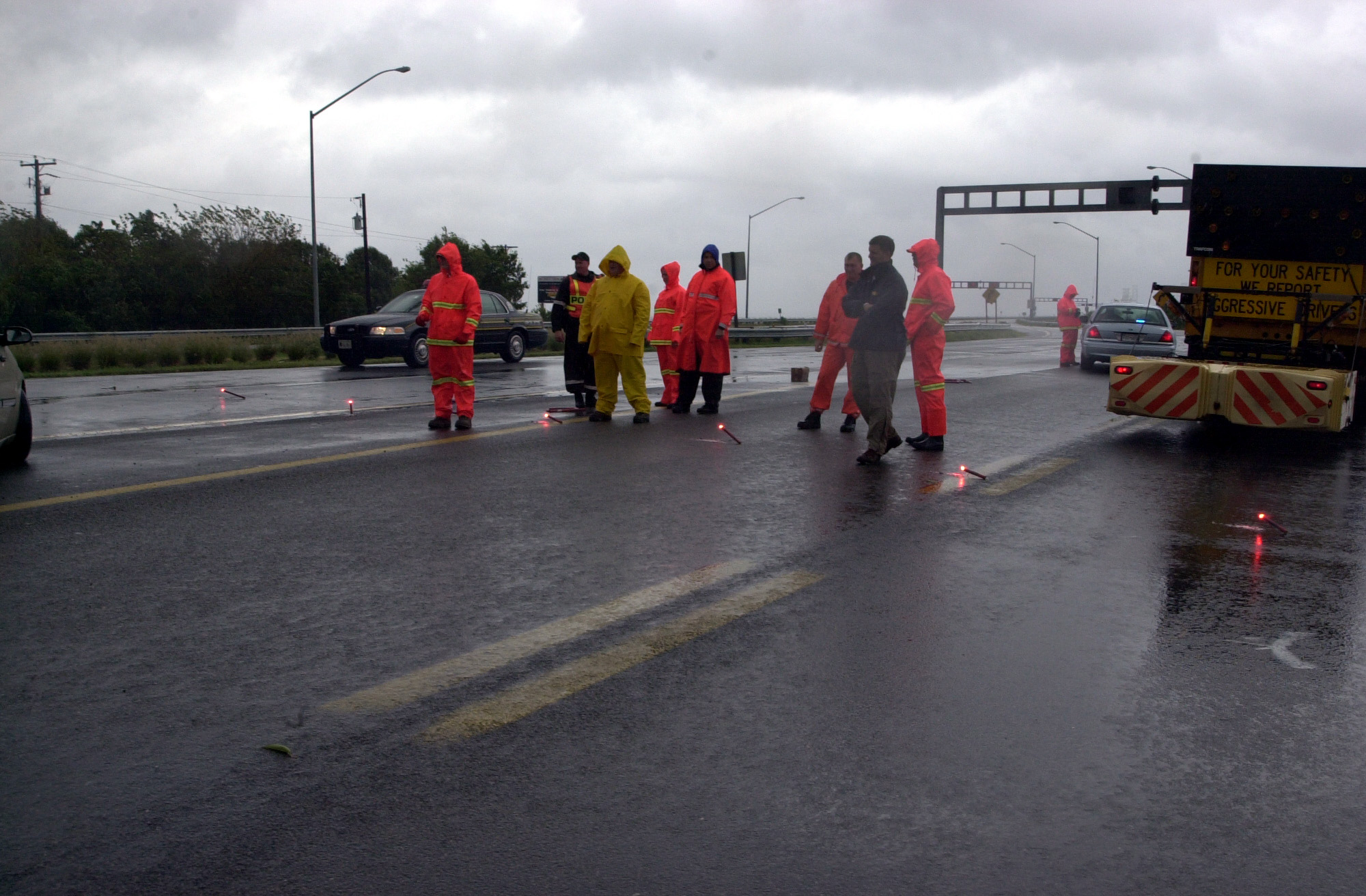
Police block traffic toward the Bay Bridge during Hurricane Isabel due to high winds.

Because of its height, the narrowness of the spans, the lack of hard shoulders, the low guardrails, and the frequency of high winds, it is often cited as one of the scariest bridges in the world, especially by drivers of tractor-trailer trucks.

The bridge has been closed four times by high winds: on September 18, 2003 (Hurricane Isabel); August 27, 2011 (Hurricane Irene; (then-Governor Martin O'Malley ordered the bridge closed when sustained winds exceeded 55 miles per hour (89 km/h)); October 29, 2012 (Hurricane Sandy); and March 6, 2013 (the March 2013 nor'easter).

On August 10, 2008, a tractor trailer involved in a head-on collision near the west end fell from the bridge; the driver died in the crash. The incident highlighted concern that the bridge may not be structurally safe, but the Maryland Transportation Authority (MDTA) discounted any structural or engineering problems with it. Inspections of the wall in the weeks following the accident revealed that there was deterioration in the form of corrosion of the steel reinforcements inside barriers; this prompted immediate repairs to the wall.

On June 24, 2024, traffic on both spans was suspended for nearly 30 minutes in late morning as the cargo ship MV Dali passed under, escorted by tugboats, on its journey from the Port of Baltimore to Virginia International Gateway in Norfolk, VA. The Dali had collided with Baltimore's Francis Scott Key Bridge on March 26, leading to that bridge's collapse.

== Specifications and operations ==
A timelapse of an eastbound trip over the Chesapeake Bay Bridge

With shore-to-shore lengths of 3.83 and 4.03 miles (6.16 and 6.49 km), the two spans of the bridge form the longest fixed water crossing in Maryland. The bridge's western terminus is in Sandy Point State Park, located northeast of Annapolis in Anne Arundel County, and its eastern terminus is in Stevensville on Kent Island in Queen Anne's County. The two spans are relatively similar in height, with the older span at 354 feet (108 m) and the newer span at 379 feet (116 m).

=== Structural details ===
With the exception of the number of lanes on each (two on the original span and three on the newer span) and differences owing to the design standards for the periods in which they were built, the spans are structurally similar. Both were designed by J. E. Greiner Company, which later became a part of AECOM through the company's acquisition of URS Corporation. Each span features:

- Two main spans over the bay's two shipping channels:
  - A 3,200-foot (975 m) long suspension section over the western channel with a maximum clearance of 186 feet (56.7 m) at the 1,600-foot (490 m) main span—high enough to accommodate ocean-going vessels and tall ships
  - A through-truss 690-foot (210 m) cantilever span over the eastern channel
- Deck truss and steel girder spans flanking the main spans
- Concrete beam spans on the portions closest to the shores
- A curve near the western terminus, which is required so that the main spans cross the bay's shipping channels at 90 degrees per United States Army Corps of Engineers requirements
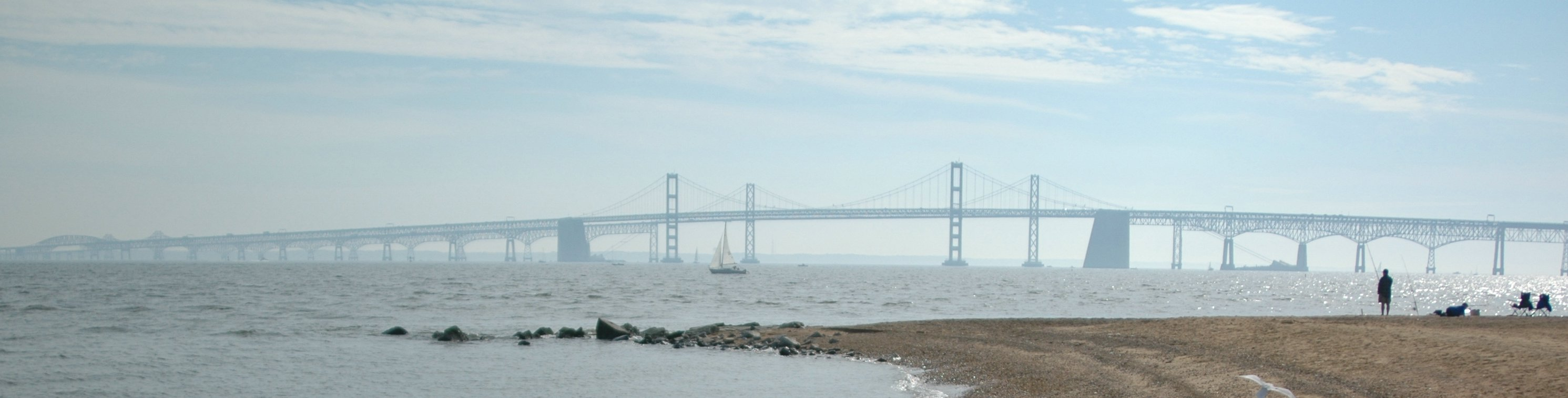
Panoramic view of the bridge, looking south, in which the two main spans (suspension at center and through truss at left) are visible. The towers with the X-shaped latticework are on the eastbound (1952) suspension span, while those with the horizontal crossmembers are on the westbound (1973) suspension span. Notice the difference in the locations of the anchoring points of the main cables: at water level for the eastbound span and at deck level atop large concrete piers for the westbound span.

=== Traffic control ===
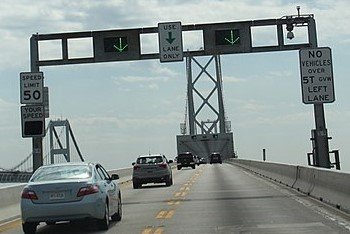
Green arrows show the proper direction of traffic on both spans.

Traffic patterns on the bridge's five lanes can be adjusted via its lane control system, which consists of overhead lane control signals on both spans and approaches. Typically, the two lanes on the south-most span are configured for vehicles traveling east on eastbound US 50/US 301, while the three lanes on the north-most span are configured for vehicles traveling west on westbound US 50/US 301; the spans are therefore referred to as the "eastbound span" and "westbound span", respectively. However, this pattern is adjusted during incidents or peak travel times: for instance, on the outset of weekends when there is a high volume of beach-bound traffic, one lane on the westbound span is configured for eastbound traffic.

In 2006, pink markers were placed along the eastbound span to mark out the suggested following distance, similar to systems used in Minnesota and Pennsylvania. The markers are a part of the MDTA's "Pace Your Space" campaign to prevent vehicle collisions and traffic congestion due to tailgating on the bridge.

In April 2013, changes were made to increase safety on the westbound span during two-way operations: signs, pavement markings, and rumble strips were modified, and a buffer zone between the left and center lanes was created. As a result, motorists can no longer switch between the left and center lanes, whether or not two-way operations are in effect. Two-way traffic may occur on the eastbound span during overnight roadwork or during emergency situations that close the westbound span, on which two-way traffic is more common. When the MDTA closes either span for overnight roadwork, it implements two-way traffic on the span that remains open. During eastbound span closure, two-way traffic operates on the westbound span with the center lane closed.

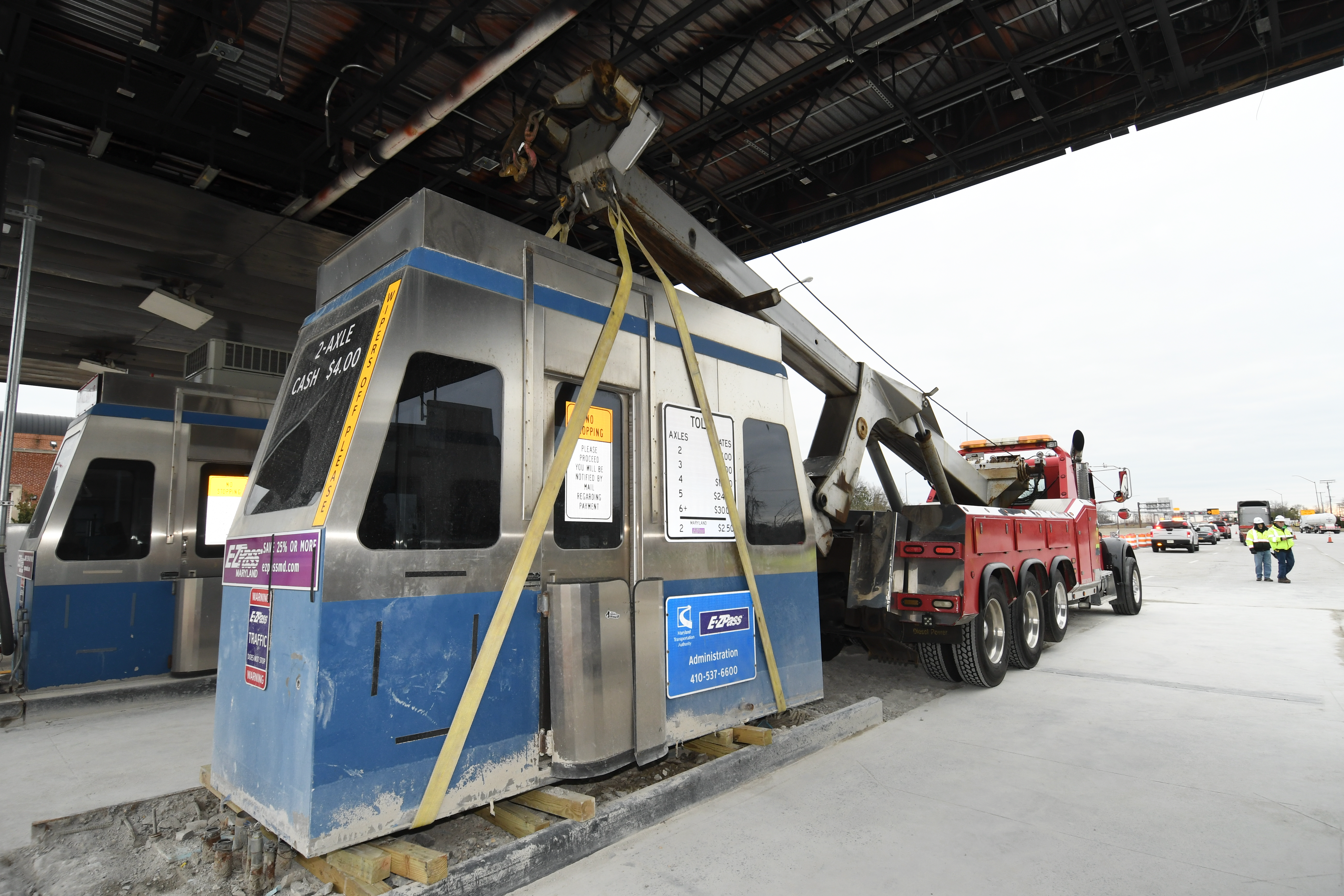
A tollbooth is removed in January 2020 following Governor Hogan's announcement.

In January 2020, Governor Larry Hogan announced that the tollbooths on the eastbound side of bridge were being removed in preparation for all-electronic tolling on the Kent Island side of the eastbound bridge. The merged lanes tie directly into the two lanes on the eastbound bridge. The MDTA is replacing lane control signals on both bridges with those that have flashing strobe lights to indicate a lane closure or a lane with contraflow traffic, and is installing an automated gate system on the bridge to allow quicker implementation of two-way traffic on the bridge. The automated gate system will reduce traffic congestion when implementing two-way traffic. Illuminated pavement markings will be installed to show where the crossovers are during two-way traffic operations. MDTA crews will no longer have to manually open and close the crossovers for two-way traffic operations.

The MDTA has used traffic cones and barrels to open and close crossovers, and to create tapers for the reversible lane. When two-way traffic is implemented, the MDTA momentarily stops traffic to reposition traffic cones and barrels to taper traffic into the reversible lane. MDTA Police then escort traffic across the bridge in the reversible lane. The MDTA will not implement two-way traffic in certain weather conditions, including excess precipitation and high winds. The MDTA may stop all traffic when the wind speed exceeds 55 mph. Two-way traffic on the bridge requires all associated signage and systems to be operational. The MDTA has to monitor two-way traffic operations on the bridge due to the length of the bridge and its lack of shoulders. The MDTA will stop two-way traffic if westbound delays pile up, at which point westbound traffic will be prioritized. Any time contraflow traffic is implemented on either of the bridges, the speed limit for the contraflow lane is reduced to 40 mph while the other lanes remain at 50 mph. MDTA Police will momentarily stop traffic for MDTA crews to reposition traffic cones and barrels to close off the left lane leading up to the bridge in the event of inclement weather during contraflow traffic.

=== Tolls and fees ===
Operated by the MDTA, the bridge has a one-way toll (eastbound) of $4.00 for two-axle vehicles; vehicles with a Maryland E-ZPass pay $2.50. Previously the bridge had a one-way (eastbound) toll of $6.00 for two-axle vehicles (raised from $4 on July 1, 2013); vehicles with E-ZPass that were enrolled in the Bay Bridge Commuter Plan paid $2.10 (raised from $1 on July 1, 2013).

Tolls were collected in both directions until April 1989, when tolls were doubled and only collected in the Eastbound direction.

In 2005, E-ZPass lanes were added at the Chesapeake Bay Toll Plaza.

All-electronic tolling began on May 12, 2020, with tolls payable through E-ZPass or Video Tolling, which uses automatic license plate recognition.

The MDTA previously provided transportation across the bridge for nervous drivers, but that role is now filled by private companies.

== Bay Bridge Walk and Run ==
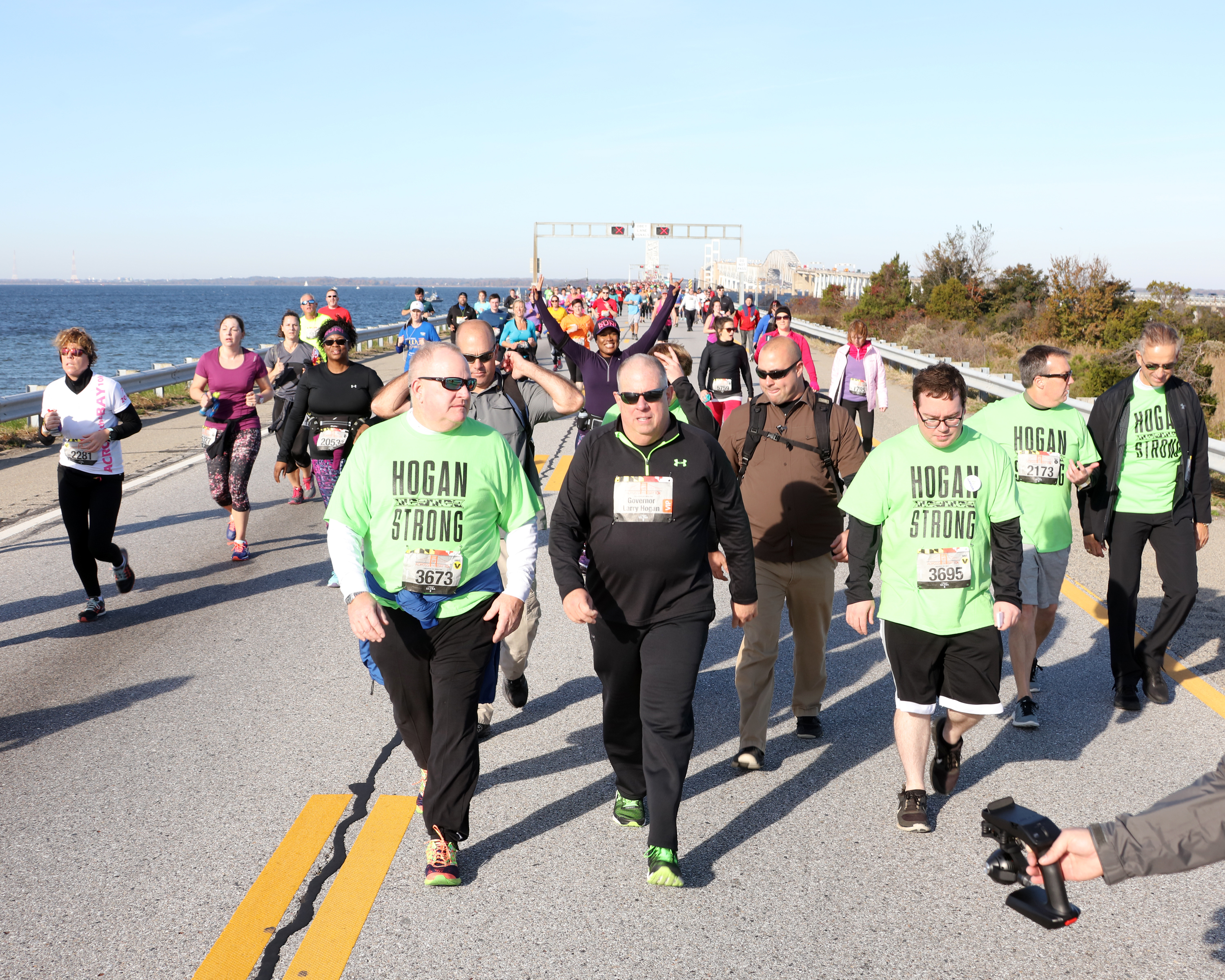
Governor Larry Hogan participates in the 2016 Across the Bay 10K.

While there are no pedestrian facilities on the bridge, the Bay Bridge Walk and Governor's Bay Bridge Run used to afford an opportunity to cross the bridge on foot, usually on the first Sunday in May. The events took place on the eastbound span, which was closed to vehicles while two-way traffic shared the westbound span. Participants started on the east end of the bridge (on Kent Island) and proceeded west to the finish near the toll plaza. WMATA and MTA transit buses transported participants between outlying parking areas and the start and finish points.

The run, a 10K race across the bridge, is held early in the morning before the walk. It is conducted by the Annapolis Striders, a local running organization, and controlled by the MDTA and Maryland Department of Natural Resources. Proceeds went to the Chesapeake Bay Trust in support of the bay.

The first walk was held in 1975, when a Towson Boy Scout leader asked Governor Marvin Mandel if his troop could walk across the bridge during maintenance. The annual walk was canceled for the first time in 1980 due to poor weather conditions, and later saw frequent cancellations throughout the 2000s. During this period the walk was canceled in:

- 2002 and 2007 due to poor weather conditions.
- 2003 and 2005 due to security concerns.
- 2008, 2009, and 2010 due to construction activity in the area on the west side of the bridge where participants would otherwise be staged. Fiscal concerns were also cited as a contributing factor to the 2010 cancellation.
- 2011 due to fiscal concerns.
- 2012 for undisclosed reasons.
- 2019 cancelled due to bridge maintenance and 2020 due to COVID-19.
- 2025 cancelled due to inclement weather, according to the MDTA.

Following its cancellation in 2005, the MDTA considered decreasing the annual frequency of the event, citing traffic, fiscal, manpower, and security concerns. The most recent event (held in 2006) cost over $350,000, and the cost estimate for 2012 was almost $400,000. In late 2011, a non-profit group, the Greater Washington Sports Alliance (GWSA), approached the MDTA Capital Committee to propose sponsoring the event, along with a concert at Sandy Point State Park, at no cost to the MDTA. While the Capital Committee unanimously recommended that the MDTA Board approve the proposal contingent upon an agreement between the GWSA and the MDTA, the 2012 event was ultimately cancelled.

After increasingly consistent cancellations of the walking event, the MDTA, along with Queen Anne's County, contracted with an outside company to have a professional 10K race across the bridge, which has been labeled the "Across the Bay 10K". The inaugural event occurred November 9, 2014. The Race Director is Dave McGillivray, who has served in that capacity for the BAA Boston Marathon since 1988. The Across the Bay 10K has several charity beneficiaries, including bay research, bay restoration, and breast cancer research. The IRONMAN Foundation took over the race's organization in 2016. In 2019, the race was held virtually due to maintenance on the bridge.

After a multi-year hiatus, the Bay Bridge Run returned in October 2021 under a new contract extending through 2027. Corrigan Sports Enterprises, in partnership with Sean Ryan Sports Enterprises for operations, assumed management of the event in coordination with the MDTA and Queen Anne's County.

== Impact ==
In the years since the bridge's completion, Ocean City (pictured) has experienced significant growth.

Since its construction, the bridge has made significant impacts on both sides of the bay; among them has been the growth of Eastern Shore communities. When the bridge opened in 1952, and again when the second span was added in 1973, the Eastern Shore was given easier access to Baltimore and Washington, causing areas in southern Queen Anne's County to develop as bedroom communities. This extension of the Baltimore–Washington suburbs has led Queen Anne's County to be listed as part of the Baltimore–Washington Metropolitan Area. The bridge has also given easier access to Ocean City from the Western Shore, which has caused Ocean City to grow from a small town to one that is said to become the second largest city in Maryland during the summer.

In 1948, the impending completion of the bridge gave rise to an extension of US 50 to Ocean City. The route was extended along the corridor of Maryland Route 404 (MD 404) and a large portion of US 213, cutting both of those routes back. During the 1950s, US 50 on the Western Shore was rerouted onto the long-proposed Annapolis–Washington Expressway (now known as the John Hanson Highway), which was built at the time in order to provide better access to the bridge. As the Eastern Shore, particularly Ocean City, grew, further upgrades and realignments of US 50 took place. This work included the aforementioned 1973 completion of the second Bay Bridge span, the extension of the US 50 freeway eastward to the US 50/US 301 split in Queenstown, and the construction of a freeway bypass around the north side of Salisbury in 2002. Additionally, the road has been upgraded and realigned over the years from its original two-lane configuration to a four-lane divided highway, with the last such section being in Vienna, bypassed in 1991. Previous plans to expand US 50's freeway portion and replace the aging Harry W. Kelley Memorial Bridge into Ocean City have been delayed.

The bridge is often the site of suicides by jumpers. As of 1995, more than 75 people had committed suicide during the bridge's 43-year existence.

== Future expansion ==
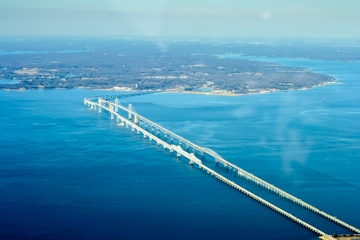
Chesapeake Bay Bridge

In December 2004, a study concluded that traffic across the bridge was expected to increase by 40% by 2025. The following year, a task force formed by Governor Bob Ehrlich met to again explore the possibility of establishing a new Chesapeake Bay crossing. The task force concluded that a bridge would be the best option for an additional crossing, and four geographic locations for such a bridge were explored: Anne Arundel County to Queen Anne's County (the existing location), Baltimore County to Kent County, Anne Arundel or Calvert County to Talbot County, and Calvert County to Dorchester County. In late 2006, the task force released a report on the study but did not make a final recommendation; members of the task force requested additional time to continue the study.

In 2020, it was announced that 11 of 14 potential sites for a third span had been rejected by the Maryland Transportation Authority following a $5 million study into the impacts of an additional span. Significant environmental and economic impacts were identified, with a report stating that any additional crossing is "expected to be multiple billions of dollars." In December 2025, the Maryland Transportation Authority (MDTA) Board approved Alternative C (6–8–6 South) as the agency’s “recommended preferred alternative” in the Chesapeake Bay Crossing Study: Tier 2 National Environmental Policy Act (NEPA) process. The recommendation would replace the existing bridge spans with two new four-lane spans (four lanes per direction) with full shoulders, and remove the existing spans after the new crossing is completed. The MDTA described associated approach work, including widening portions of US 50/301 near the crossing to accommodate transitions to the new spans, along with financial commitments for transit-related improvements and further evaluation of an optional bicycle and pedestrian shared-use path.

In December 2025, MDTA stated the replacement concept would increase navigational clearance to meet United States Coast Guard requirements and would match the clearance planned for the replacement Francis Scott Key Bridge. Under the Tier 2 NEPA schedule published by MDTA, public review of the Draft Environmental Impact Statement (EIS) was expected to begin in late January 2026 with public hearings planned for February 2026, and a combined Final EIS/Record of Decision was anticipated in November 2026. MDTA stated that, pending funding, final design would begin in spring 2028 and construction could begin in summer 2032. Contemporary reporting in December 2025 described cost estimates of roughly $14.8–$16+ billion for the replacement program and noted construction was not expected to start before the early 2030s.

Proposed additional spans of the Chesapeake Bay Bridge

1	Current location; 2 spans
2	Additional span at current location
3	Baltimore County to Kent County

4	Anne Arundel/Calvert County to Talbot County
5	Calvert County to Dorchester County

== See also ==
- Kent Narrows Bridge
- List of bridges by length
- Severn River Bridge
