= Kirwan House (Maryland) =

Living museum on Kent Island, Maryland

Coordinates: 38°57′34.83″N 76°16′35.75″W

James E. Kirwan House and Store
- Location within Maryland Location within the United States
- Type: Farm
- Location: Kent Island, Maryland, US

History
- Built: 1889
- Built by: James E. Kirwan

Site notes
- Area: 300 acres (120 ha)
- Architectural style: Timber framing
- Governing body: Not-For-Profit

The James E. Kirwan House and Store is a living museum located south of the village of Chester on Kent Island in Queen Anne's County, Maryland, United States. It served as a general store, lumber mill, cooper's mill, and blacksmith shop between 1889 and 1955 and facilitated local trade as a port on Kirwan Creek. The estate was donated to the Kent Island Heritage Society in 1998 to be run as a museum.

== History ==
James E. Kirwan was born in Baltimore and served in the Maryland oyster navy, which patrolled the Chesapeake Bay to prevent illegal oyster dredging. Kirwan married Mary Rebecca Gardner in 1867 and settled in Queen Anne's County. The couple had three children: Charles (born 1868), Sophia Lavinia (born 1870) and Lemuel (born 1872). Kirwan appears on Lake, Griffing, & Stevenson's 1877 Map of Queen Anne's County as the owner of a residence and store on the west side of what is now Dominion Road. Although advertised as a Stevensville business, Kirwan's store was strategically located between the village of Chester (then called Sharktown) and the fishing community of Dominion.

Local tradition holds that in 1889, Johnstown floodwaters washed vast quantities of lumber into the Chesapeake Bay and onto the shores of Kent Island. Kirwan is said to have bought the lumber to construct the current store on the east side of Dominion Road. The complex stands on 300 acres (120 ha) of agricultural preserve and is defined by a picket fence on the west, a road trace leading to Kirwan Creek on the north, a grassy field on the east, and a hedge on the south. The centerpiece of the complex is a ca. 1889 2 testacy, 5-bay, wood-frame I-house with an attached 2-story, 3-bay, wood-frame, front-gable store. A ca. 1889 wood-frame dairy stands immediately east of the house. Also present are a wood-frame pump house, two wood-frame sheds, a concrete fountain, and concrete garden pavers and wall remnants, all dating to the 1940s.

== Significance ==
The James E. Kirwan House and Store is a historic structure on Kent Island registered with the Maryland Historical Trust and is the only preserved example of a 19th-century general store and farm site on Kent Island. Its self-sufficient facilities, extensive merchandise and seafaring trade showcase the economic isolation of the Eastern Shore of Maryland prior to the construction of the Chesapeake Bay Bridge.

Through its educational mission, the Kent Island Heritage Society now opens its sites (including Kirwan House, Stevensville Bank and Cray House) to the public monthly where Society docents provide guided tours.
