= Christ Church (Stevensville, Maryland) =

Historic church in Maryland, United States

- U.S. National Register of Historic Places
- U.S. Historic district – Contributing property
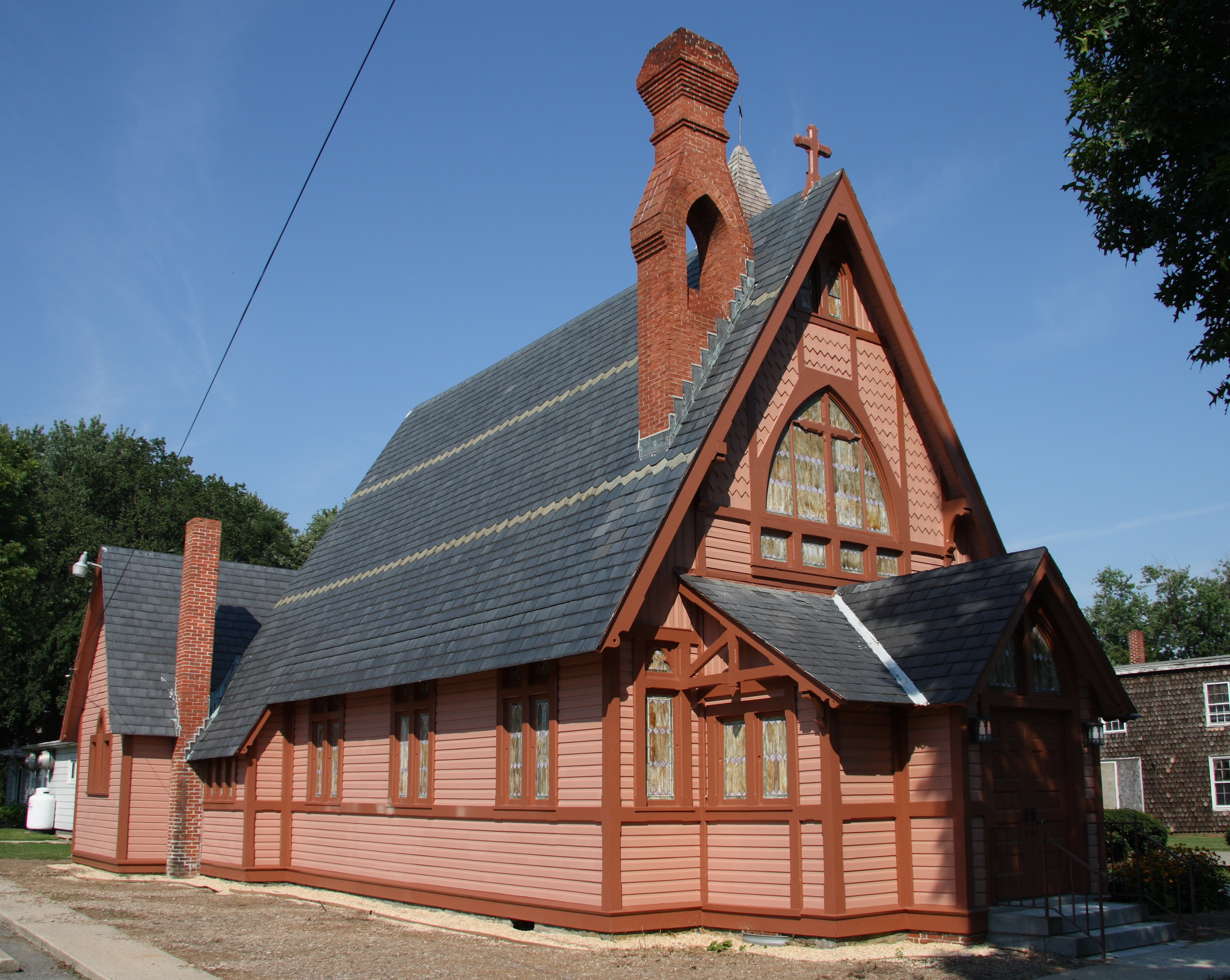
- Christ Church, seen after its restoration

- Location within Maryland Location within the United States
- Location: 121 E. Main Street (MD 835), Stevensville, Maryland
- Coordinates: 38°58′49.3″N 76°18′50.7″W
- Area: 0 acres (0 ha)
- Built: 1880
- Architects: Smith, John
- Architectural style: Queen Anne
- NRHP reference No.: 79003268
- Added to NRHP: July 24, 1979

Christ Church refers to both an Episcopal parish in Matapeake, Maryland and the historic church building in the Stevensville Historic District in Stevensville, Maryland, which the parish occupied from 1880 to 1995, and that is now a Lutheran church. Christ Church Parish was one of the original 30 Anglican parishes in the Province of Maryland.

== History ==
The Christ Episcopal Church of Kent Island is recognized as the state's oldest Christian congregation. It was founded in 1632 by the Reverend Richard James, one year after Kent Island was founded by William Claiborne, and two years before settlers arrived at St. Clement's Island. The parish has used at least six buildings during its history. The church's original location was at Kent Fort. It moved to Broad Creek in 1652, and was rebuilt there in 1712 and again in 1826. The church moved again to Stevensville in 1880 as activity shifted there from Broad Creek, and to its current location in Matapeake in 1995 due to the need for a larger building. Of the six buildings, only the 1880 and 1995 buildings are standing today. The 1880 building was listed on the National Register of Historic Places in 1979. Today, Christ Church is part of the Episcopal Diocese of Easton and owns and operates Camp Wright, a summer camp in Matapeake, which serves as the diocesan camp. The historic building is now the principal church of the Anglo-Lutheran Catholic Church.

== Gallery ==
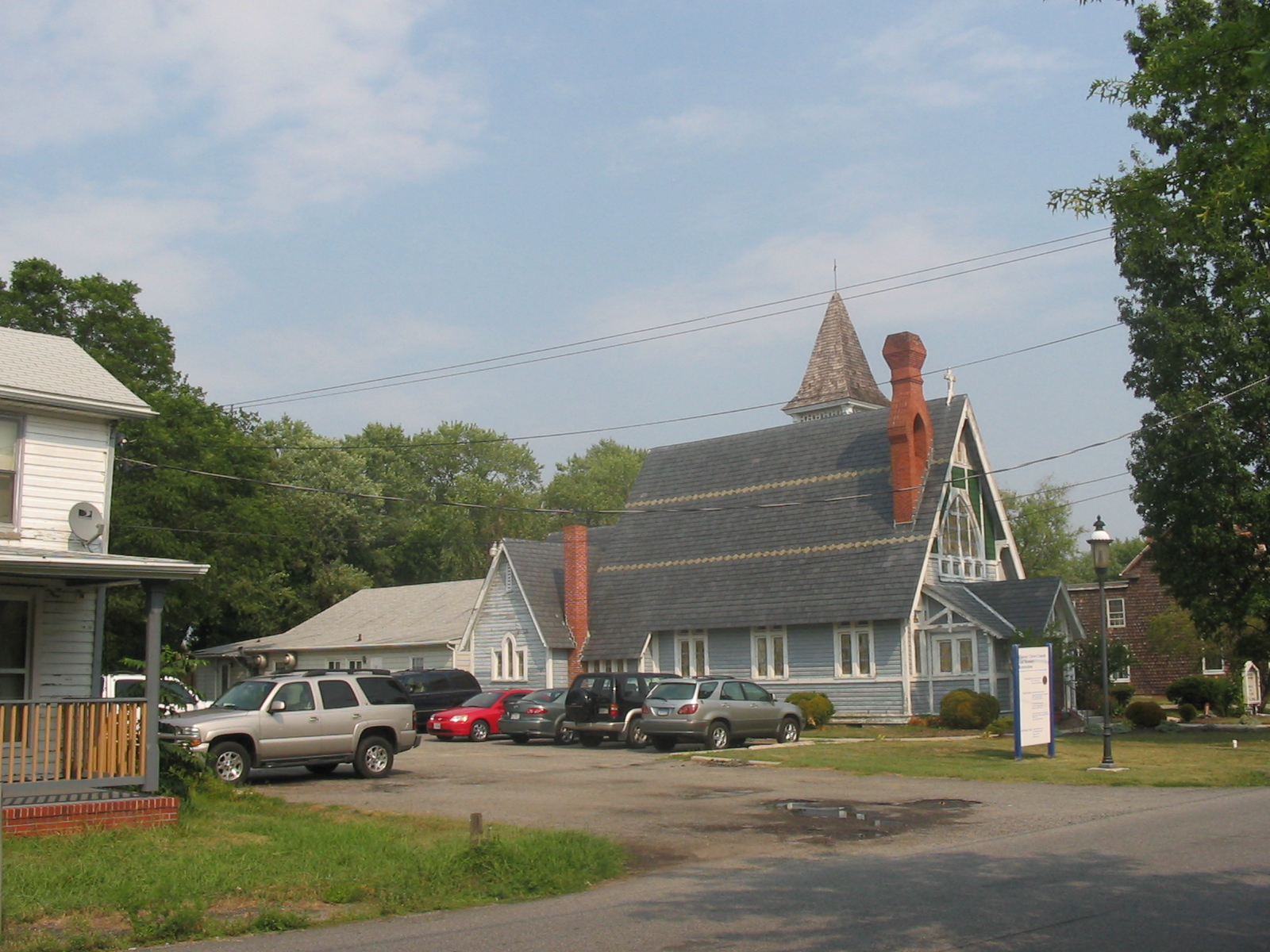
Side view of the church, taken in 2007 before its restoration

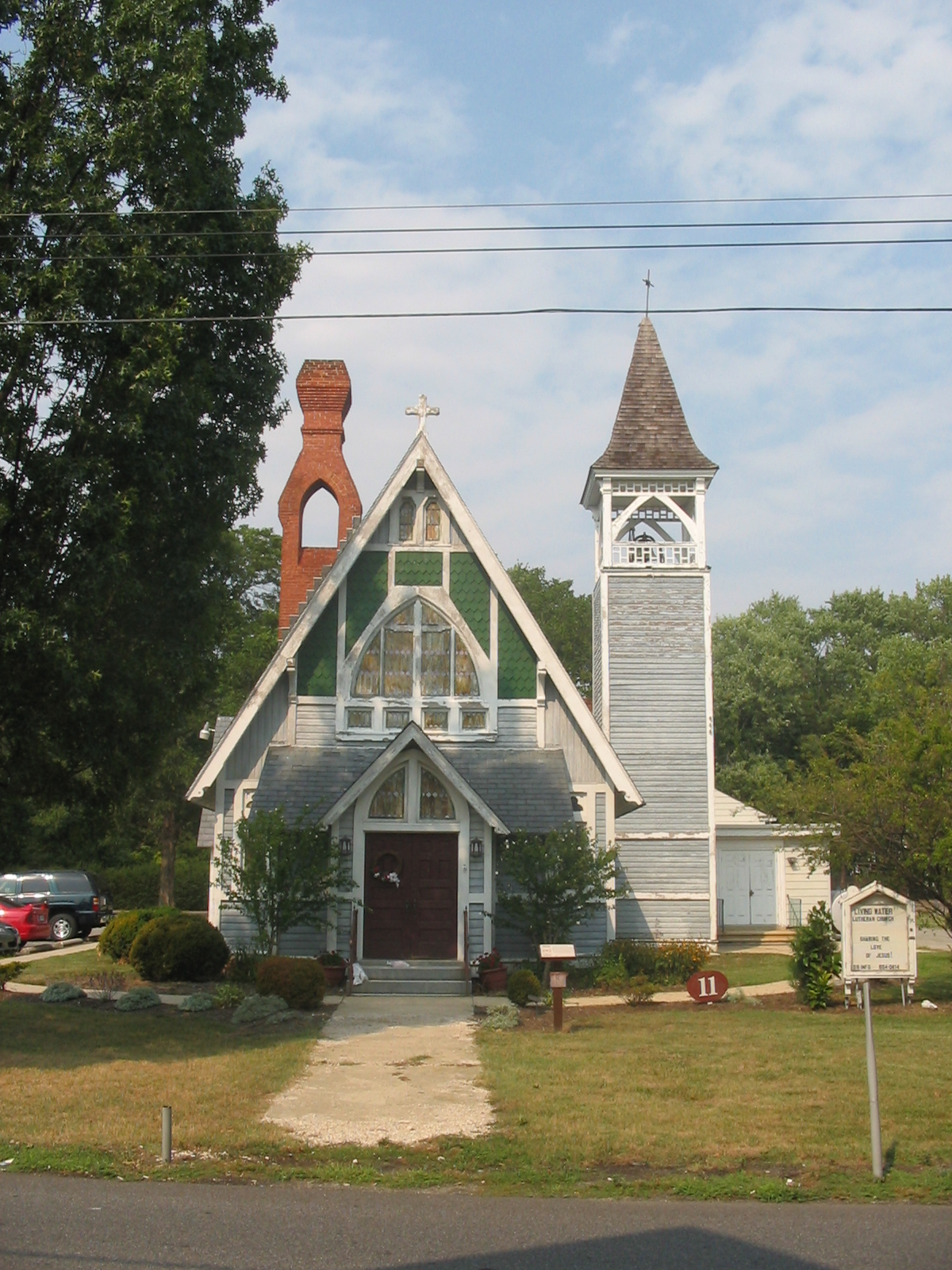
The church, seen in 2007 before its restoration

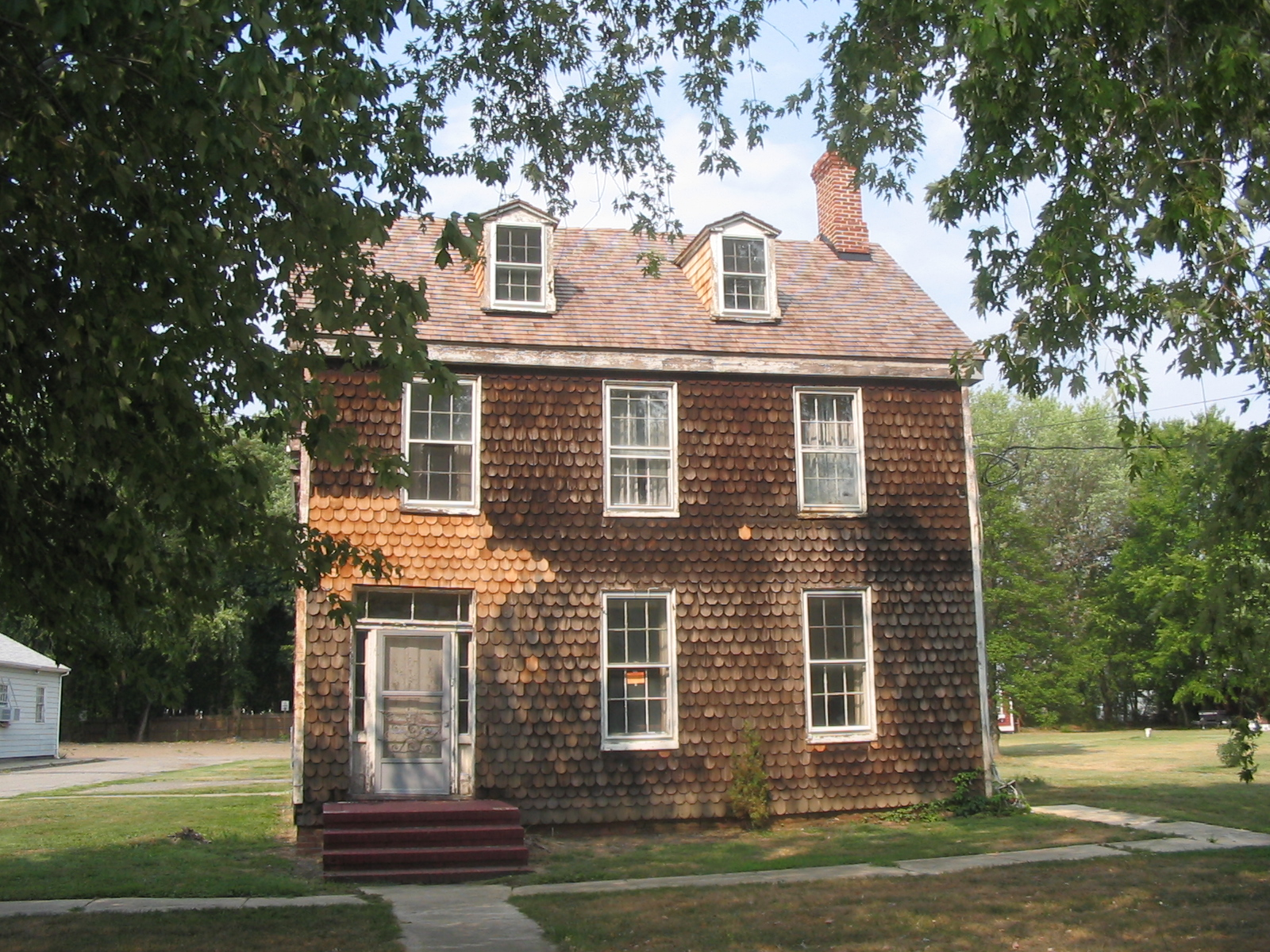
Rectory of the church

== See also ==
- List of the oldest churches in the United States § Oldest Continuous Church Congregations
