= Cray House (Stevensville, Maryland) =

Historic house in Maryland, United States

- U.S. National Register of Historic Places
- U.S. Historic district – Contributing property
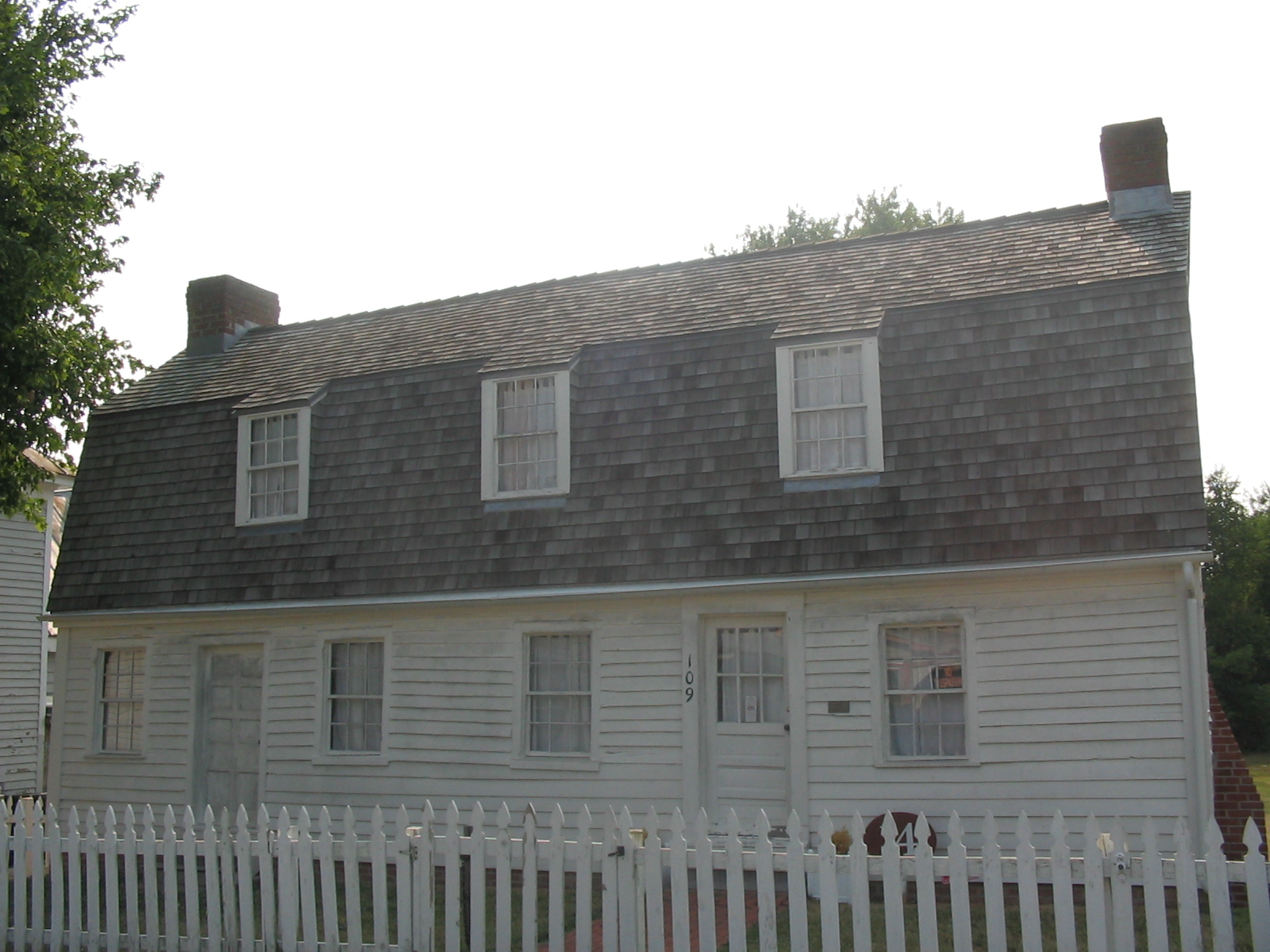
- House in 2007

- Location within Maryland Location within the United States
- Location: 109 Cockey Lane, Stevensville, MD, USA
- Nearest city: Stevensville
- Coordinates: 38°58′52.8″N 76°18′54.4″W
- Area: less than one acre
- Built: 1809
- Architectural style: Post & Plank Log Cabin
- NRHP reference No.: 83002960
- Added to NRHP: May 9, 1983

The Cray House is a two-room house in Stevensville, Maryland. Built around 1809, it is a rare surviving example of post-and-plank construction, and of a build of small house which once dominated the local landscape. For these reasons it was listed on the National Register of Historic Places in 1983.

== History ==
The house was constructed in two stages, with the earliest portion dating to around 1809. The land upon which it stands was once called Steven's Adventure, after Francis Stevens, to whom the title was granted in 1694. The first section to be built, using an unusual sort of post-and-plank method, was a three-bay, 1 1/2-story house. Later, a frame addition was made to the south end, also containing three bays. At this time the original roof was replaced by a gambrel roof, which ran the entire length of the house. The resulting structure is quite similar to a house style that was once relatively common during the late 18th and early 19th century in Queen Anne's County, Maryland.

The house was auctioned publicly in 1914; its namesake, widow Nora Cray, later lived there with her nine children. In 1975 her heirs donated the house, and its lot, to the Kent Island Heritage Society, a group which restored and furnished it and opened it to the public.

== Construction ==
The earlier section of the house remains fairly ordered; a central door on each facade is flanked by six-over-six-pane windows. The north gable end is a blank wall, and the chimney is "paneled", with its brickwork exposed up to the second floor. In these respects, the house is not unique, as several similar houses can still be found countywide. The modest size of the original house, too, is very much in keeping with other houses of its age from the surrounding area; such buildings were common in Tidewater Maryland well into the nineteenth century. Less common is the post-and-plank construction of the earliest portion of the house, unusual in Tidewater Maryland, and examples such as this, where the planks run from corner to corner, were virtually unknown before this example was found.

The house has a hall-parlor plan that had only one heated room per floor. Despite its small size, however, it was kitted out with full interior trim; elements include beaded board partition and baseboards, a two-piece chair rail, refined trim and a mantel on the first floor.

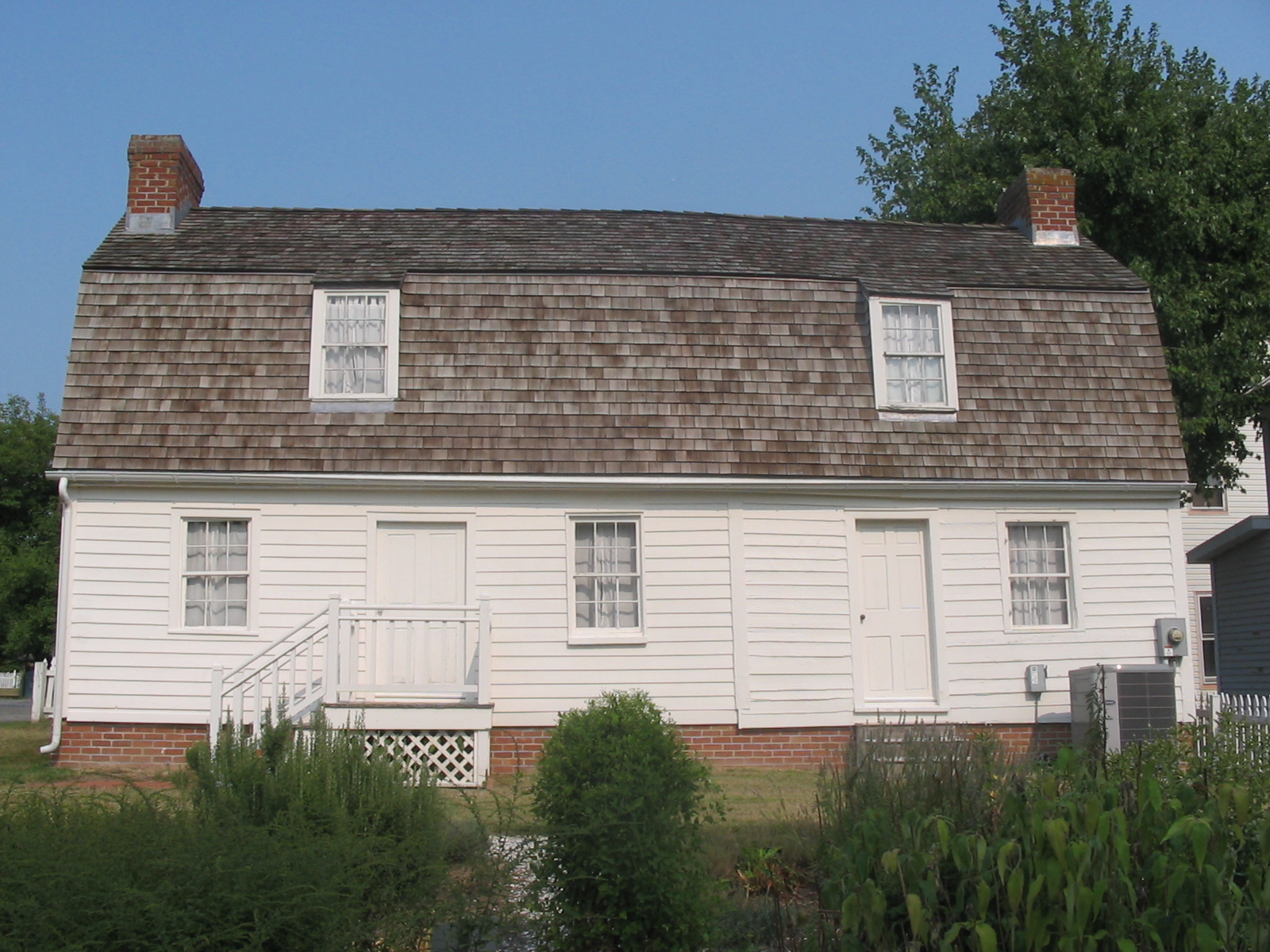
The rear of the house, seen in 2007

In addition to the main dwelling, a smokehouse stands on the property, at the rear of the lot. This structure is not original to the site, but was moved to the house as a rare example of a once-common feature of houses in the region. It is currently operated as a gift shop in conjunction with the house-museum.

== Significance ==
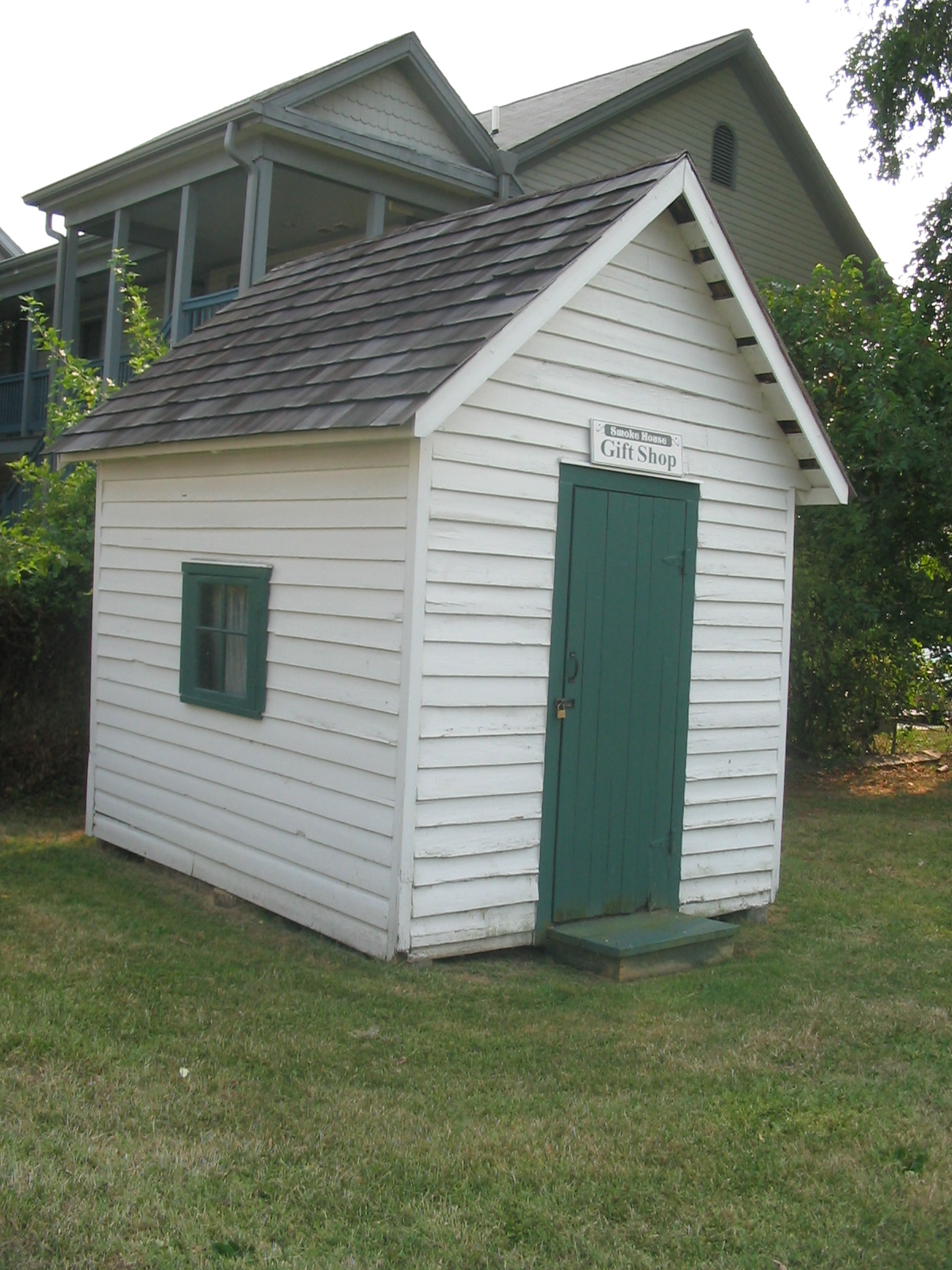
Meat house on the property, now used as a gift shop

When first discovered, the Cray House was thought to be a unique survival of an unusual type of post-and-plank construction. Subsequent investigations have shown that a number of these buildings remain, scattered throughout Tidewater Maryland. Unfortunately, almost all of these buildings are in threatened condition. The majority of the known examples are either small farm buildings or have been adapted as kitchen wings for larger houses. The Cray House, along with two similar buildings in southern Maryland, remain the only examples of such a structure that have remained relatively intact as dwellings.

The Cray House is one of a number of historic structures in Stevensville; many are grouped within the Stevensville Historic District, but the Cray House was listed separately. It is, however, located in the middle of the historic area, on Cockey Lane; behind it is the Stevensville Train Depot, while just down the street are the Old Post Office building and the Stevensville Bank.
