= Kentmorr Airpark =

Airport near Stevensville, Maryland, US

- IATA: none; ICAO: none; FAA LID: 3W3

Summary
- Operator: Pete Meyer
- Serves: Stevensville, Maryland
- Built: 1945
- Coordinates: 38.91797°N 76.35877°W
- Interactive map of Kentmorr Airpark

Runways
Direction	Length		Surface
Direction	ft	m	Surface
10-28	2,400	732	Turf

(ICAO: K3W3, FAA LID: 3W3) is an airport located five miles south of Stevensville, Maryland, United States, on the Chesapeake Bay.

== History ==
The airport was founded by Nathan "Bill" Morris on a potato patch located on Kent Island. He built a hangar with a small single family home above, creating one of the first hangar-homes in the country. Morris was one of the world's oldest active pilots later in life, flying at 98 years of age.

The residential airpark is lined with 14 homes that share access to the grass runway.
