= Legg's Dependence =

Historic house in Maryland, United States

- U.S. National Register of Historic Places
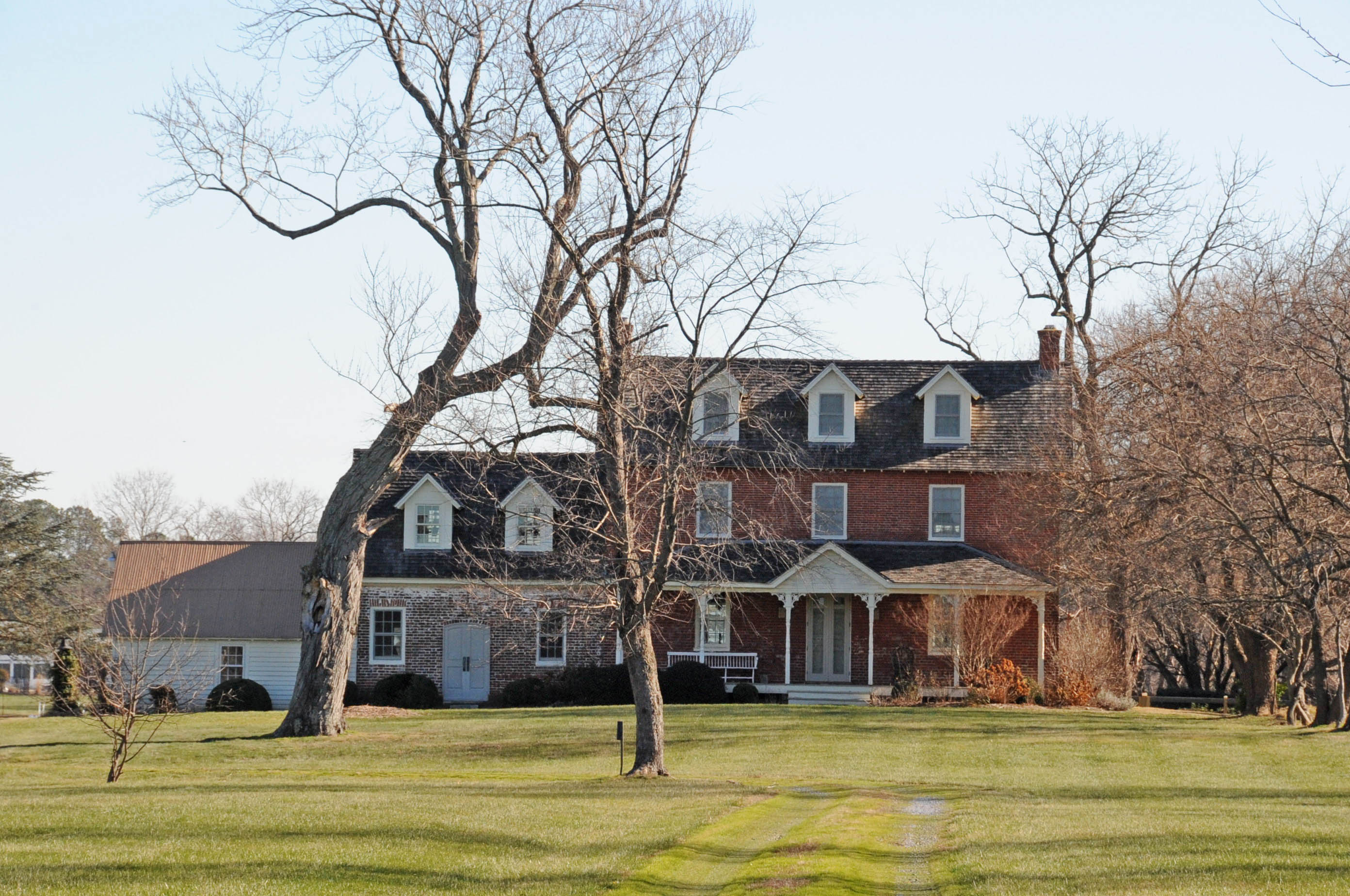

- Location within Maryland Location within the United States
- Location: 200 Long Creek Court, Stevensville, Maryland
- Coordinates: 38°55′13″N 76°20′46″W
- Area: 5.1 acres (2.1 ha)
- Built: 1760
- Architectural style: Georgian, Greek Revival
- NRHP reference No.: 03001116
- Added to NRHP: November 8, 2003

Legg's Dependence, also known as Long Creek Farm and William E. Porter Farm, is a historic home located at Stevensville, Queen Anne's County, Maryland. It is a 2 1/2-story center-hall plan Flemish bond brick house. It was built in several stages beginning around 1760–80, as a single-story hall/parlor plan dwelling. It was enlarged to its present form during the second quarter of the 19th century.

The estate at one point was home to an enslaved husband and wife, Sling and Sarah Louis, who were sold through a trader in Richmond, Virginia, to the owner of a plantation near Ashbie's Gap in Virginia. One or both of Sling and Sarah's parents later escaped with the help of Harriet Tubman and found their way to Philadelphia.

It was listed on the National Register of Historic Places in 2003.
