= Friendship (Stevensville, Maryland) =

Historic house in Maryland, United States

- U.S. National Register of Historic Places
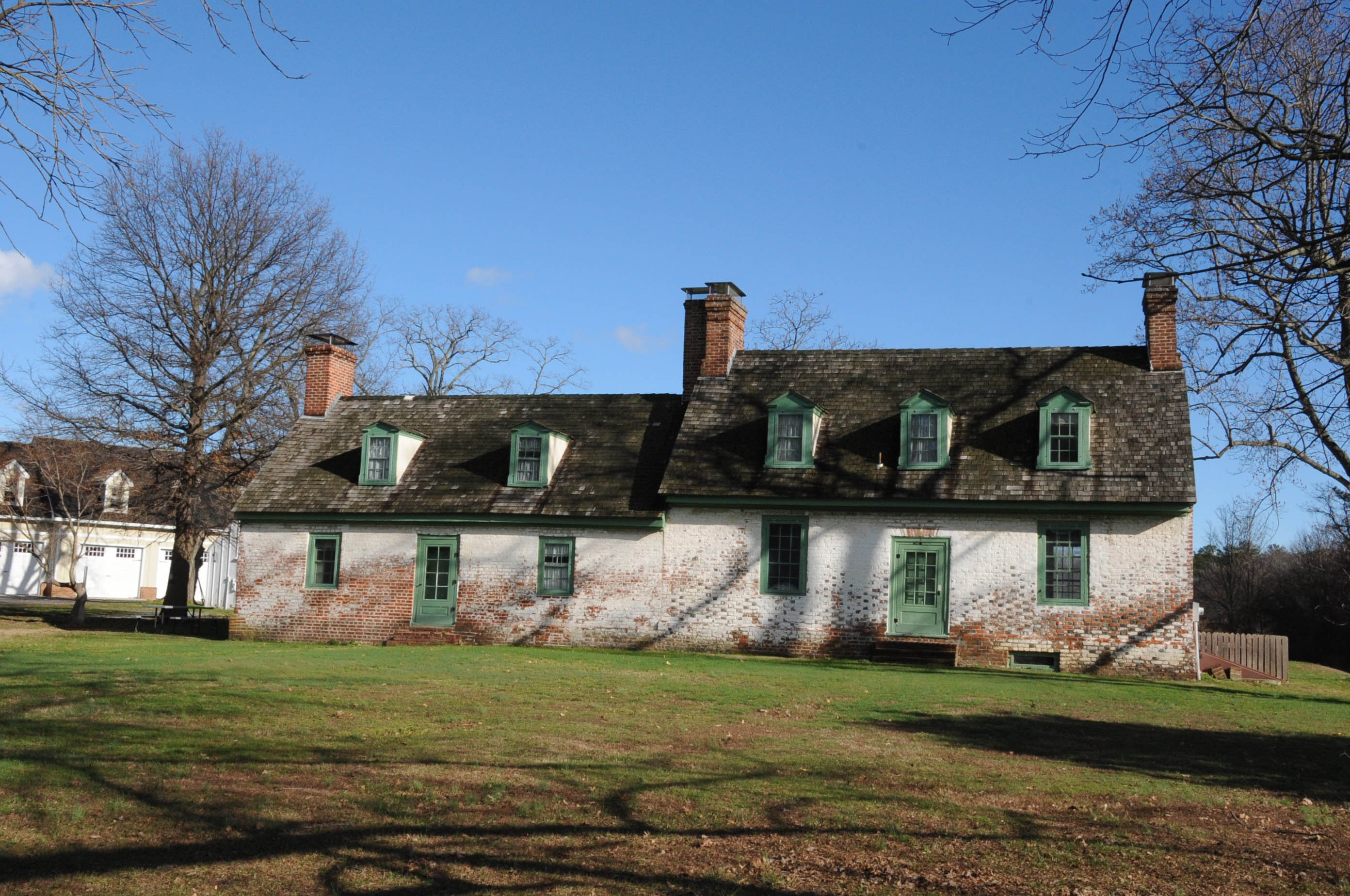

- Location within Maryland Location within the United States
- Location: Kent Point Road (MD 8), Stevensville, Maryland
- Coordinates: 38°57′12″N 76°20′43″W
- Area: 2 acres (0.81 ha)
- Built: 1740
- Architectural style: Colonial
- NRHP reference No.: 94000727
- Added to NRHP: July 15, 1994

Friendship is a historic home located at Stevensville, Queen Anne's County, Maryland. It is a 1 1/2-story dwelling of Flemish bond brick construction and was built in two stages, both dating to the 18th century. The earliest section is traditionally believed to date to the 1740s. Also on the property is a frame smoke house and dairy.

It was listed on the National Register of Historic Places in 1994.
