= Jay Fleming =

American photographer

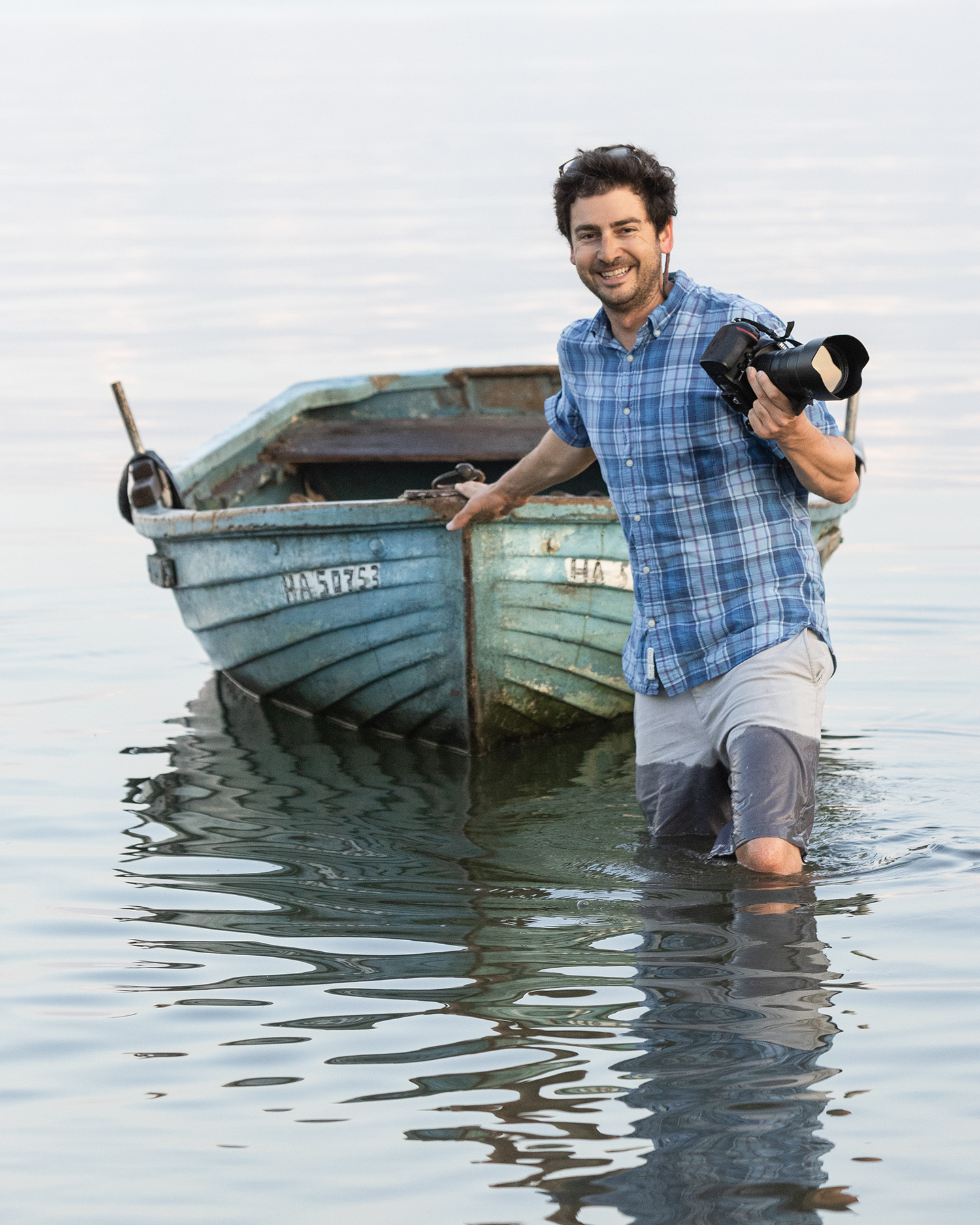
- Fleming in 2023
- Born: Annapolis, Maryland, U.S.
- Education: St. Mary's College of Maryland
- Occupation: Photographer
- Years active: 2015–present

Jay Fleming is an American photographer specializing in the documentation of Chesapeake Bay’s watermen, wildlife, and environmental issues affecting the region. Based on the Eastern Shore of Maryland, he has published the books Working the Water (2016) and Island Life (2021) and conducts photography workshops focused on Chesapeake Bay culture and ecosystems.

== Early life ==
Fleming was born and raised in Annapolis, Maryland, and also lived in Lewes, Delaware. His parents’ careers influenced his early life; his father worked as a photographer for National Geographic, and his mother held a position at the Maryland Department of Natural Resources (DNR). His exposure to both nature and photography began at a young age. His father often took him along on photography excursions, allowing him to learn photography hands-on with a Nikon film camera handed down from his father.

Fleming's experiences with the Maryland DNR also shaped his interests. During high school, he interned with the DNR, participating in activities such as fish tagging and monitoring projects with biologists, giving him early exposure to environmental work on the Chesapeake Bay. Fleming graduated from St. Mary's College of Maryland in 2009 with a bachelor's degree in economics.

== Career ==
Fleming's worked for the Maryland DNR's seafood marketing program. He developed strategies to connect consumers with locally sourced Maryland seafood, including launching the "True Blue" program to promote local sourcing. This role inspired his idea for a photography project focused on the Chesapeake Bay's seafood industry, leading him to explore the lives of watermen on the Bay. In 2015, he left the DNR to pursue a full-time career in photography, capturing images that documented the Bay's watermen and natural landscapes for various publications and personal projects.

Fleming began offering photography workshops in 2015, initially leading small groups to Smith Island to photograph watermen, wildlife, and island landscapes. These workshops have expanded over the years to include multiple locations across the Chesapeake Bay, such as Deal Island and Cove Point Lighthouse. Over 150 people attended the workshops in 2024. Fleming operates his workshops with a custom-built Privateer boat, which is designed to navigate the Bay's shallow waters and handle workshop logistics. In 2021, he relocated his photography studio from Annapolis to Stevensville, Maryland.

In 2016, Fleming self-published his first book, Working the Water, a photojournalistic collection that illustrated the lives of watermen, crab pickers, and boat builders. He spent three years gathering images, immersing himself in the Chesapeake's seafood culture and capturing scenes from harvesting to processing. Fleming's second book, Island Life, published in 2021, focused on Smith Island and Tangier Island, exploring the unique cultures of these islands in the Chesapeake Bay. His photographs documented local traditions, as well as the impacts of rising sea levels and climate change on the Bay's islands.

== Personal life ==
Jay Fleming resides in Annapolis, Maryland.
