= Post-and-plank =

Wooden building technique

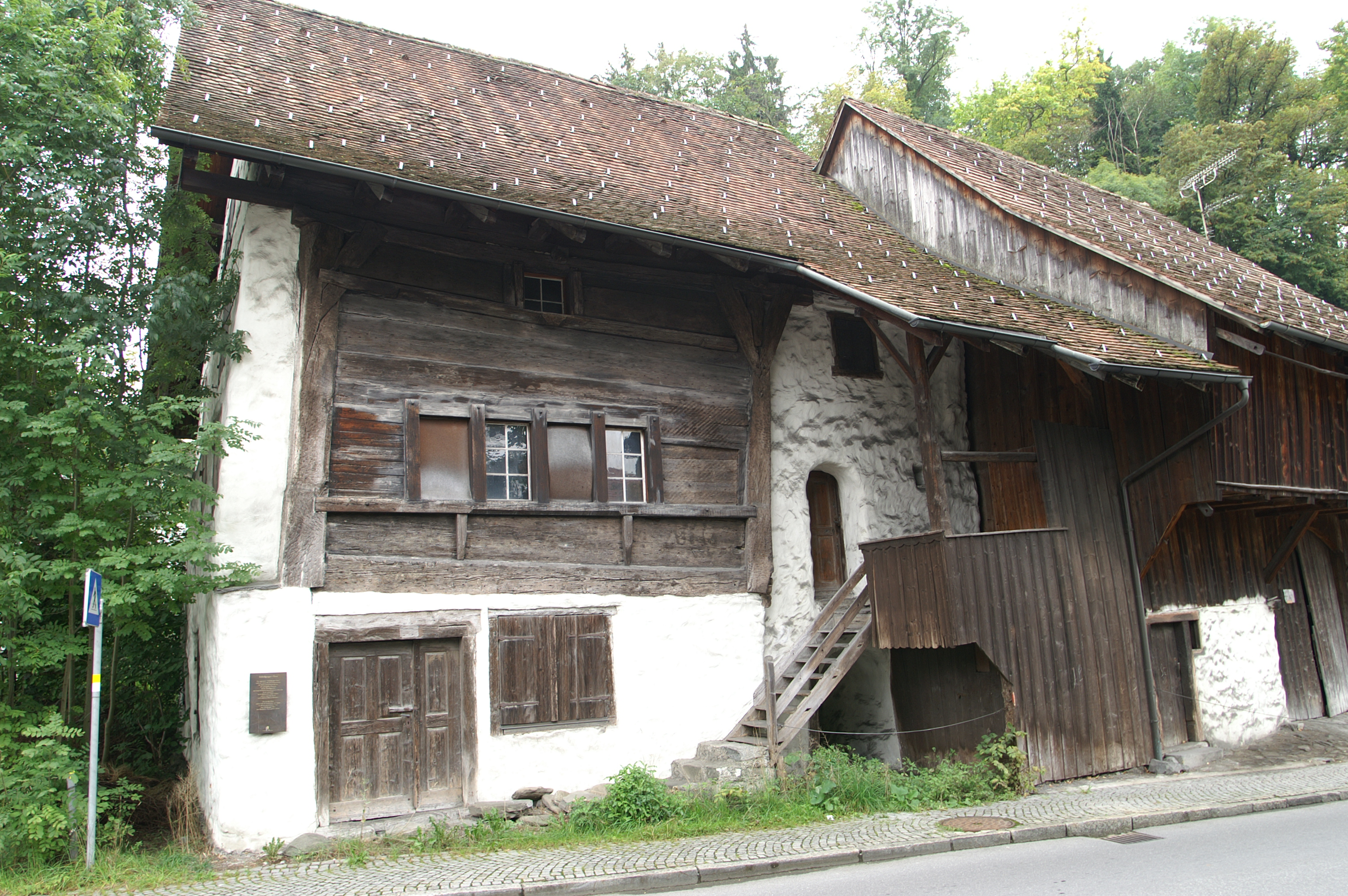
Ancient example of partial bohlenständerkonstruktion from the 13th century in Dornbirn, Austria

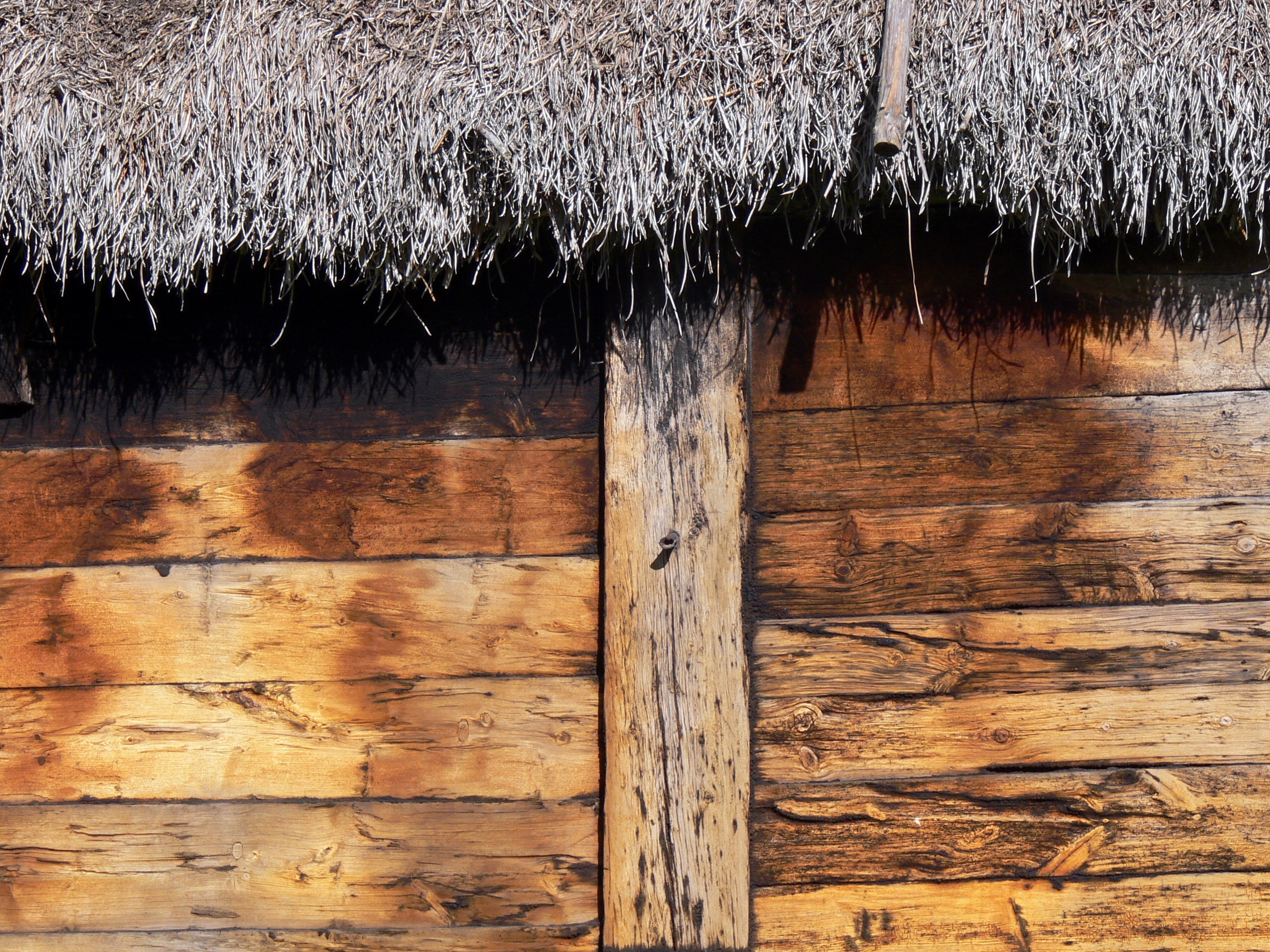
Bunge Museum in Gotland, 17th century. The wall planks fit into grooves in the posts.

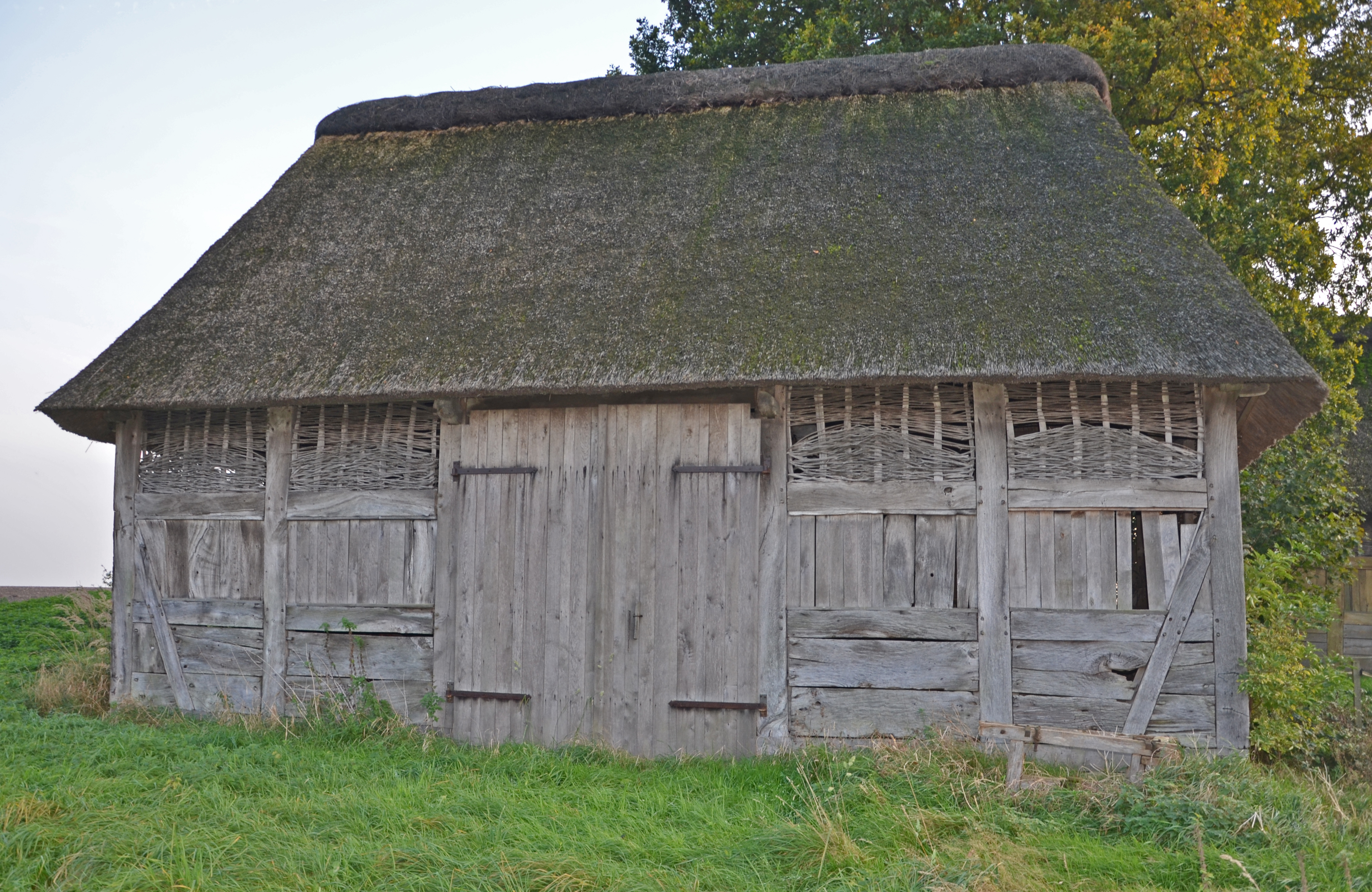
A 17th century barn recognized as a cultural heritage monument in Bassum, Germany. Note the wattle-work for ventilation.

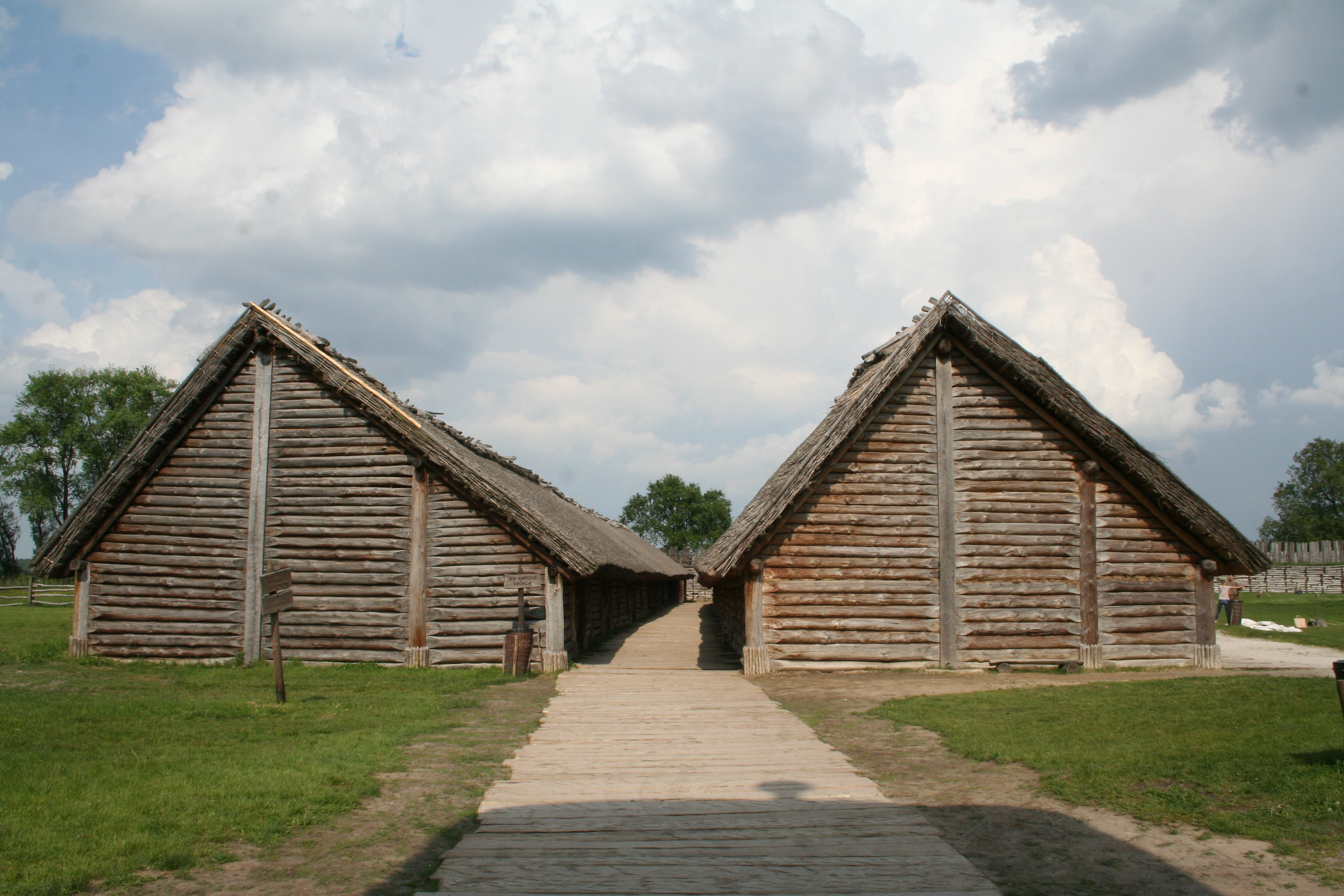
Reconstruction of building remains found at Biskupin, Poland. from circa 738 B.C.

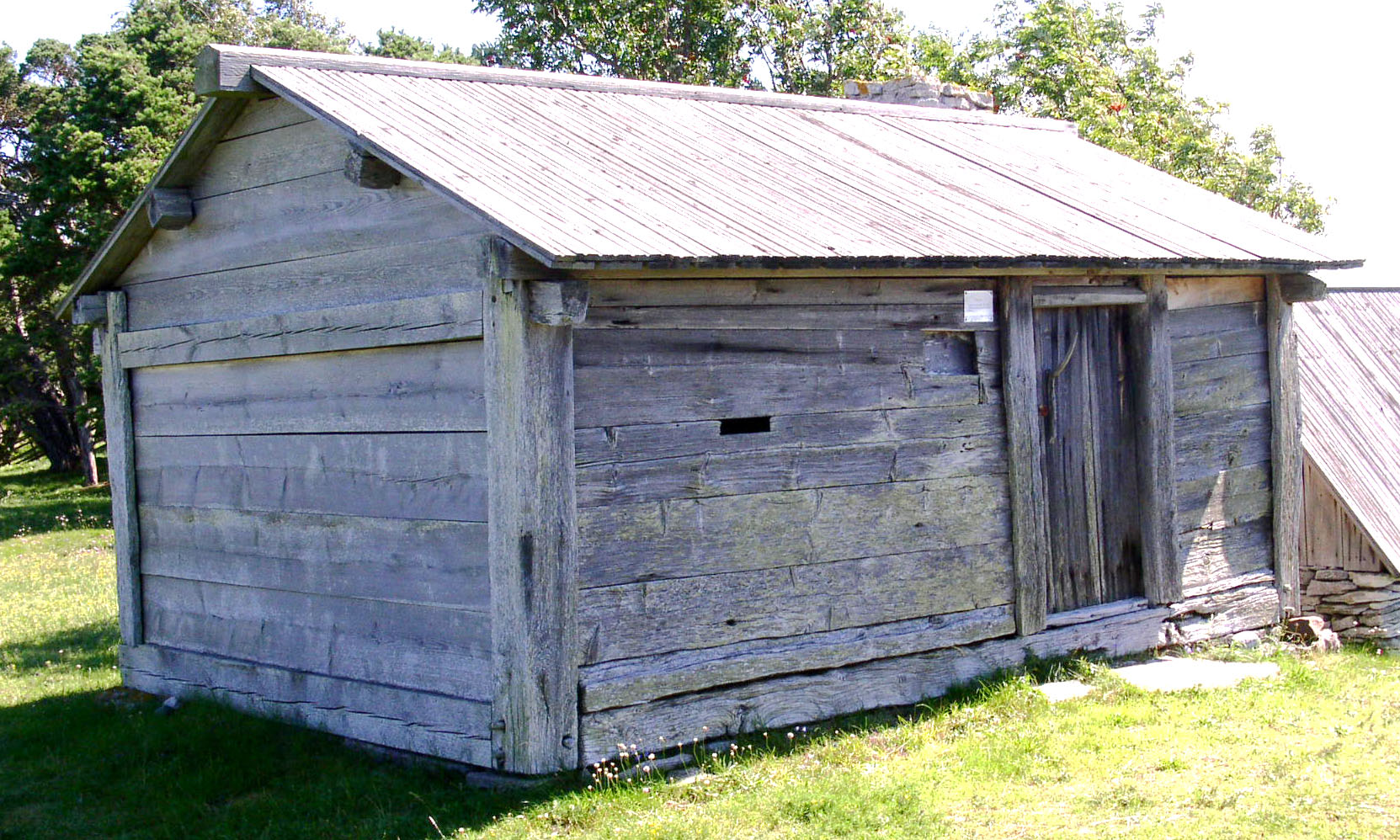
Bulhus in Gotland

The method of building wooden buildings with a traditional timber frame with horizontal plank or log infill has many names, the most common of which are piece sur piece (French. Also used to describe log building), corner post construction, post-and-plank, ständerbohlenbau (German) and skiftesverk (Swedish). This traditional building method is believed to be the predecessor to half-timber construction widely known by its German name fachwerkbau which has wall infill of wattle and daub, brick, or stone. This carpentry was used from parts of Scandinavia to Switzerland to western Russia. Though relatively rare now, two types are found in a number of regions in North America, more common are the walls with planks or timbers which slide in a groove in the posts and less common is a type where horizontal logs are tenoned into individual mortises in the posts. This method is not the same as the plank-frame buildings in North America with vertical plank walls.

== Other names ==
- French: pièce sur pièce poteaux et pièce coulissante (piece on piece sliding in a groove), pièce sur pièce en coulisse, poteaux et piece coulissante, pieces sur pieces, poiteau cannale, and poteaux sur soles.
- German (including southern Germany, Switzerland, and Austria): blockstanderbau (log frame construction), standerblockbau (frame log construction), ständerbohlenbau (post plank construction), bohlenständerbau (plank post construction), and sometimes bohlenwand
- Polish: sumikowo-łątkowa (planks—sumiki, sumikami, palcami; post—łątki)
- English: section plank wall, corner-post log construction, corner posting technique, corner posting, post cornering, vertical-post log construction, post and log, post and panel, Red River frame, Hudson's Bay style, Hudson's Bay corners, Rocky Mountain frame, Manitoba Frame, "Métis" style, "French" style, slotted post construction, grooved post, post and fill, panel construction, section panel, and running mortise and tenon (or tongue).
- Danish: bulhus (bole house which means plank house)
- Italian: a ritti e panconi

== European history ==
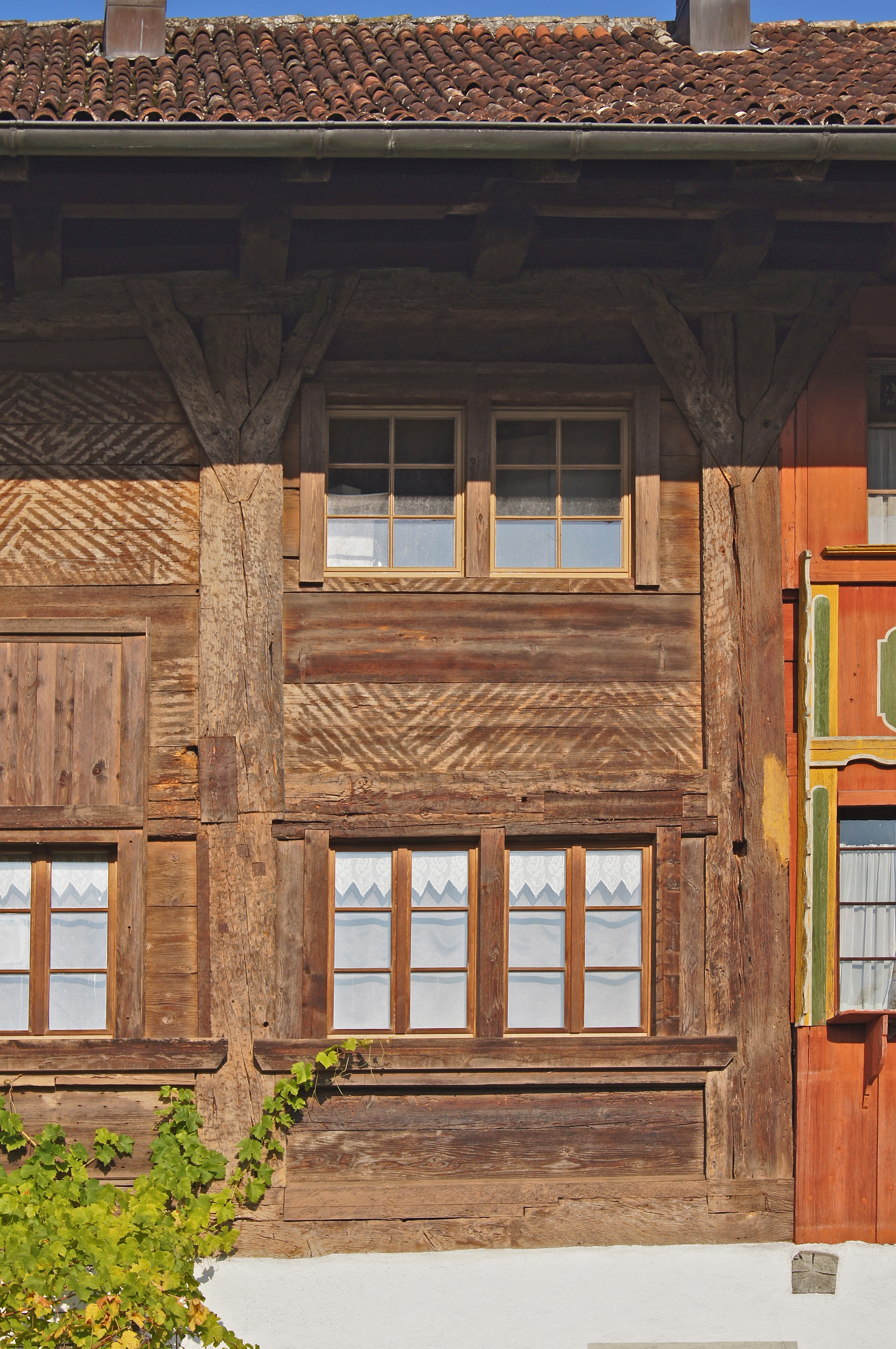
A 1460 Bohlenständerbau (plank-frame house) in Switzerland

The support of horizontal timbers by corner posts is an old form of construction in Europe. It was apparently carried across much of the continent from Silesia by the Lausitz urnfield culture in the late Bronze Age. The Lausitz culture is also known as the Lusatian culture, and within their territory is an archaeological site and archaeological open-air museum at Biskupin, Poland, where remnants of such structures were found and reconstructed. The structures found dated from 747 to 722 B.C and are similar in concept to piece sur piece construction. This historic carpentry is known in southern Sweden (skiftesverk), particularly Gotland where it is also known as bulhus, Germany, Poland, including Silesia and Bohemia.

In 2018, an oak well structure assembled in a post-and plank method was unearthed near Ostrov during motorway construction. The wood was well preserved, as it was submerged in water. Its age was established using the dendrochronological method, by tree ring dating—the oak trees used to build the well were felled around 5256 BC and started growing in 5481 BC, during the Early Neolithic period, more than 7,000 years ago. The shape of the individual structural elements and tool marks preserved on their surface confirm sophisticated carpentry skills.

== North American history ==
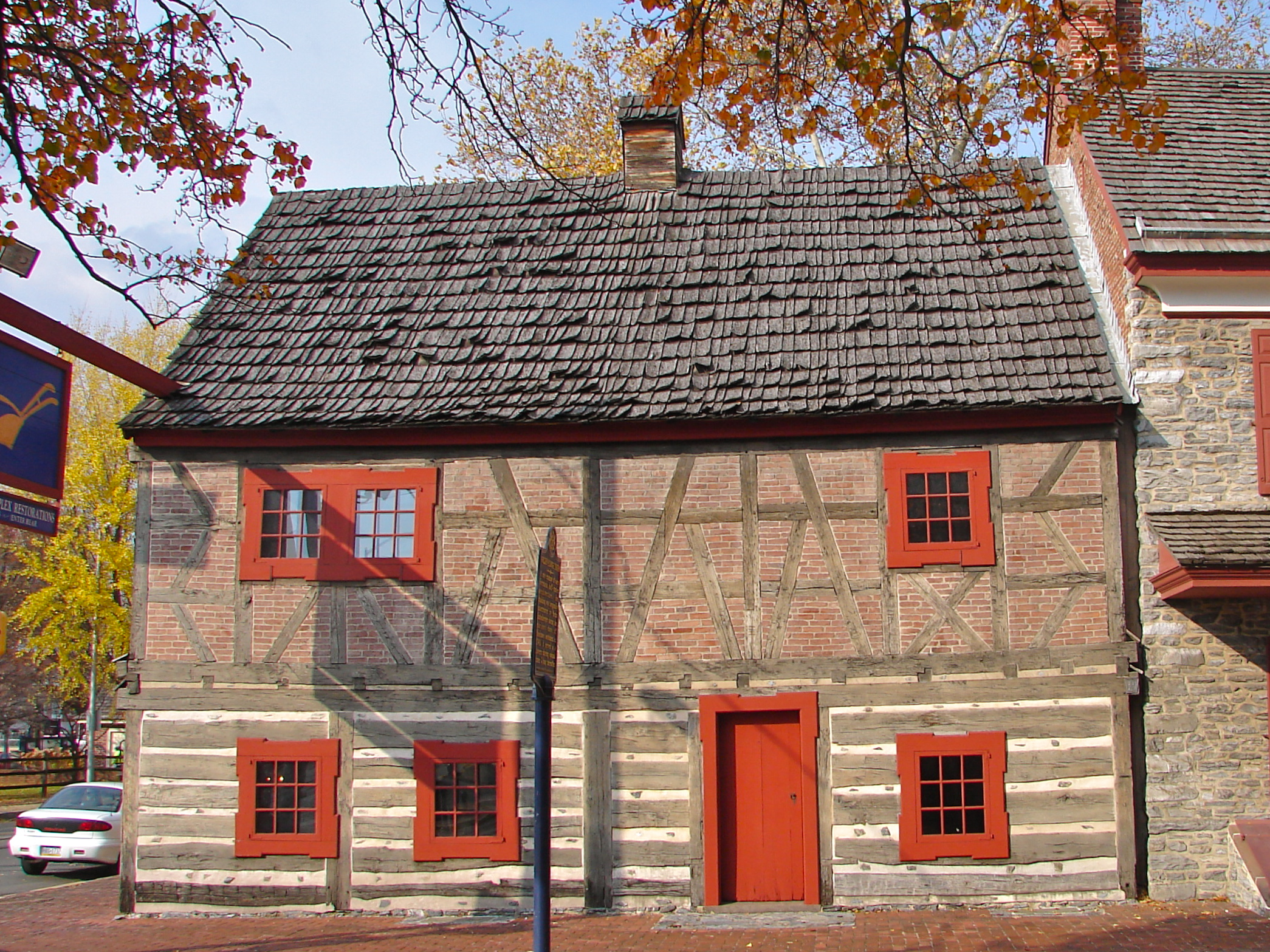
The 1741 Golden Plough Tavern, York, Pennsylvania, U.S.A. The ground floor is standerblockbau and the upper floor on the front is half timbered (fachwerkbau)

Some researchers believe this building method was introduced to the United States by Alpine-Alemannic Germans or Swiss, and to by French fur trappers working for the Hudson's Bay Company. Others who have studied the development house building in New France believe that the method was developed endemically in Canada as a local adaption of the half-timbered house, spreading from Québec to the Pacific through the Hudson's Bay Company. The Hudson's Bay Company adopted this style for most of its outposts all the way to the Pacific coast. Some examples of surviving houses of this structural type are the circa 1809 Cray House in Stevensville, Maryland, 1832 Jacob Highbarger House in Maryland, and the George Diehl Homestead in Pennsylvania.

Red River frame was a popular name for the post-and-plank construction technique used in the Red River Colony in the 19th century. The building style was characterized by a dressed timber structure with a horizontal log infill. The spaces between the logs were filled or 'chinked' with clay and straw. The exterior would either be whitewashed with a limestone/water plaster mixture, or in later years, the exterior would be covered by board siding. This style was popular because it could use smaller trees for logs—the longest trees needed were for the vertical logs. Examples include the Farm Manager's House at Lower Fort Garry, the William Brown House at the Historical Museum of St James—Assiniboia, the historical Fur Warehouse at Fort St. James National Historic Site of Canada and Riel House in Winnipeg, Manitoba.

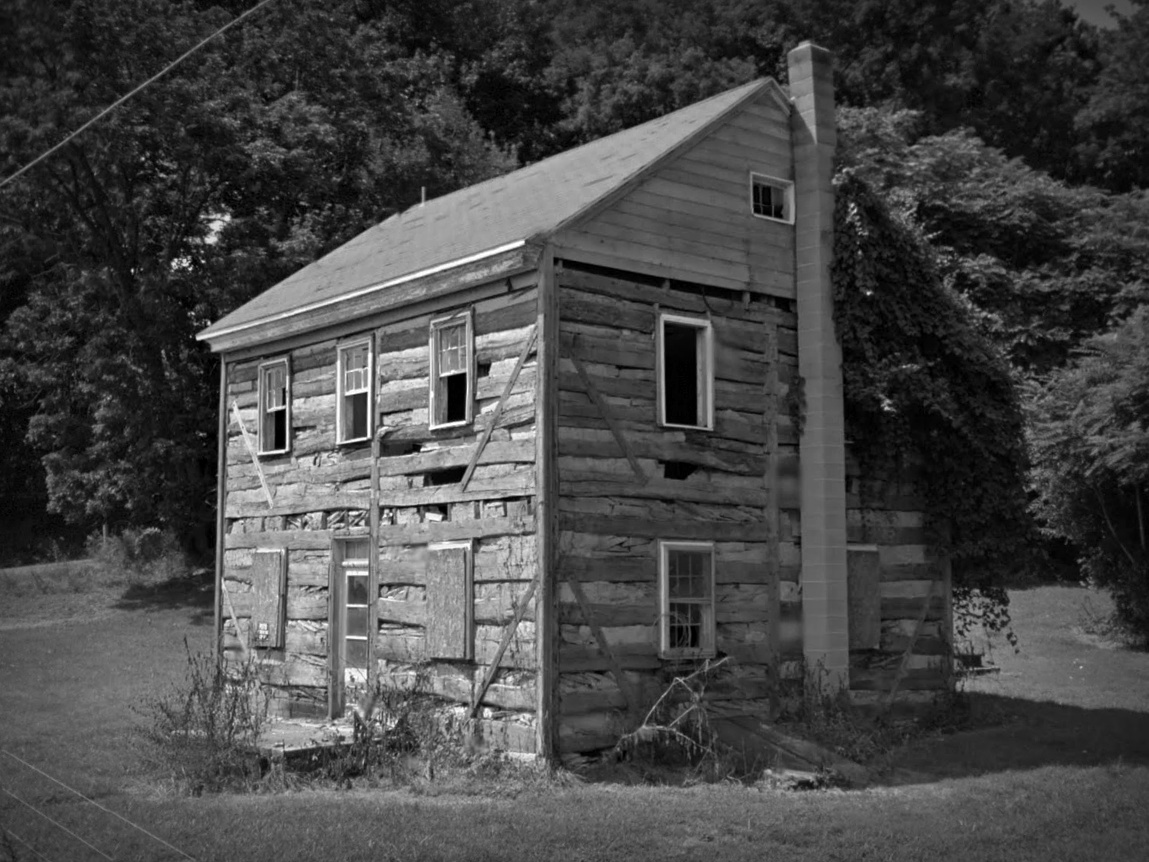
Corner post log construction in Lancaster, Pennsylvania

In southeastern Pennsylvania, numerous log houses feature corner post construction. In many cases, these houses feature diagonal bracing that resembles half-timbered architecture of Europe. In Lancaster County it is estimated that about a quarter of log houses are corner post construction.

== See also ==
- Slab hut – Australian English for vertical plank wall construction
- Plank house – Native American plank buildings
