= Mattapax =

Historic house in Maryland, United States

- U.S. National Register of Historic Places
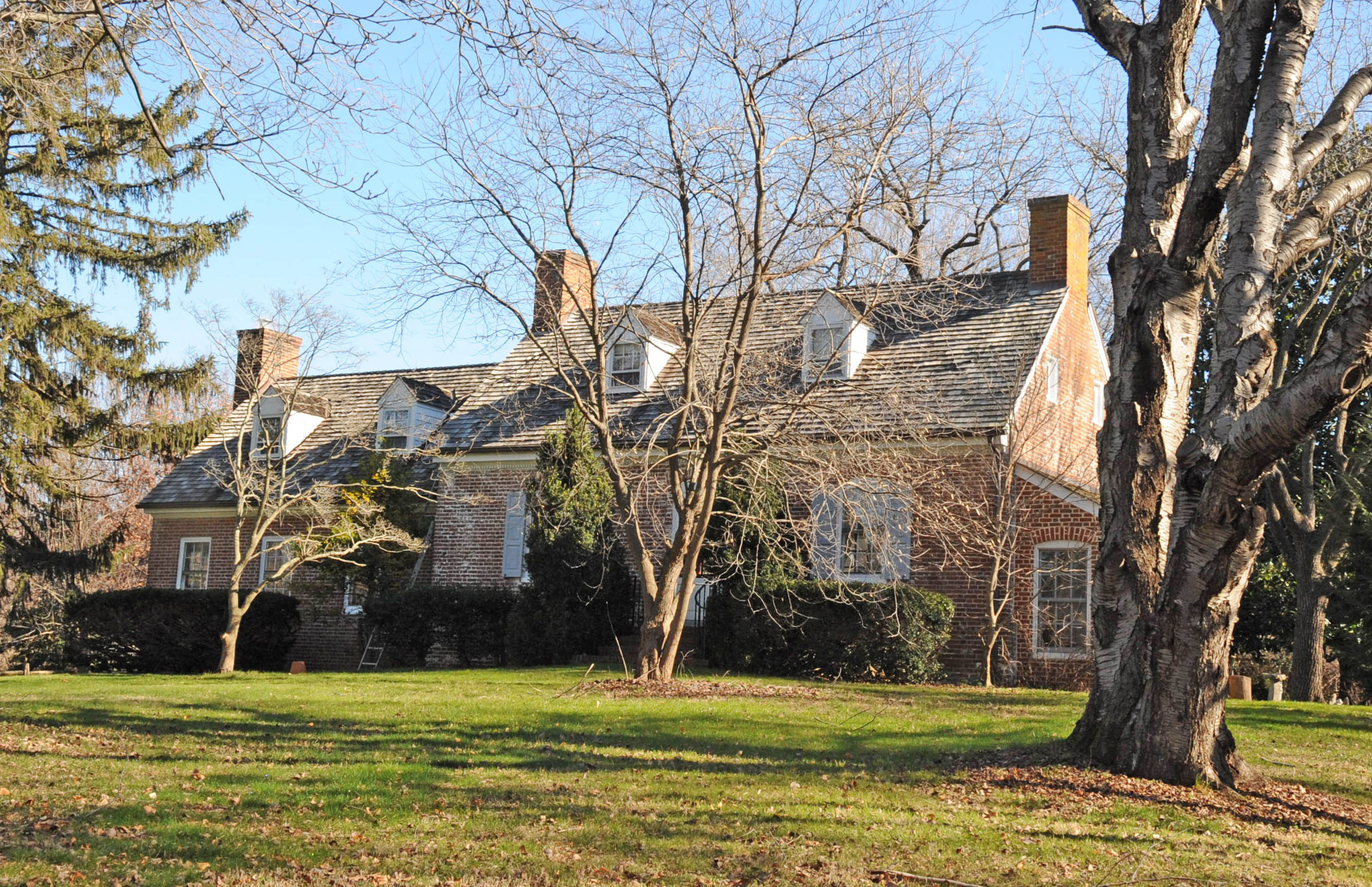

- Location within Maryland Location within the United States
- Location: 106 Shipping Creek Rd., Stevensville, Maryland
- Coordinates: 38°54′40″N 76°20′54″W
- Area: 6.6 acres (2.7 ha)
- Built: 1760, 1949
- Architect: Hogg, F. Trevor
- Architectural style: Colonial
- NRHP reference No.: 98001498
- Added to NRHP: December 10, 1998

Mattapax is a historic home located near Stevensville, Queen Anne's County, Maryland, United States. It is a 1 1/2-story Flemish bond brick house, three bays wide, and one room deep, with flush brick chimneys at either end of a pitched gable roof built about 1760. In 1949 a restoration resulted in the construction of a brick wing to replace an earlier frame wing. Also on the property are a frame cottage, a large horse barn, and a frame wagon shed.

It was listed on the National Register of Historic Places in 1998.
