= Stevensville Historic District =

Historic district in Maryland, United States

- U.S. National Register of Historic Places
- U.S. Historic district
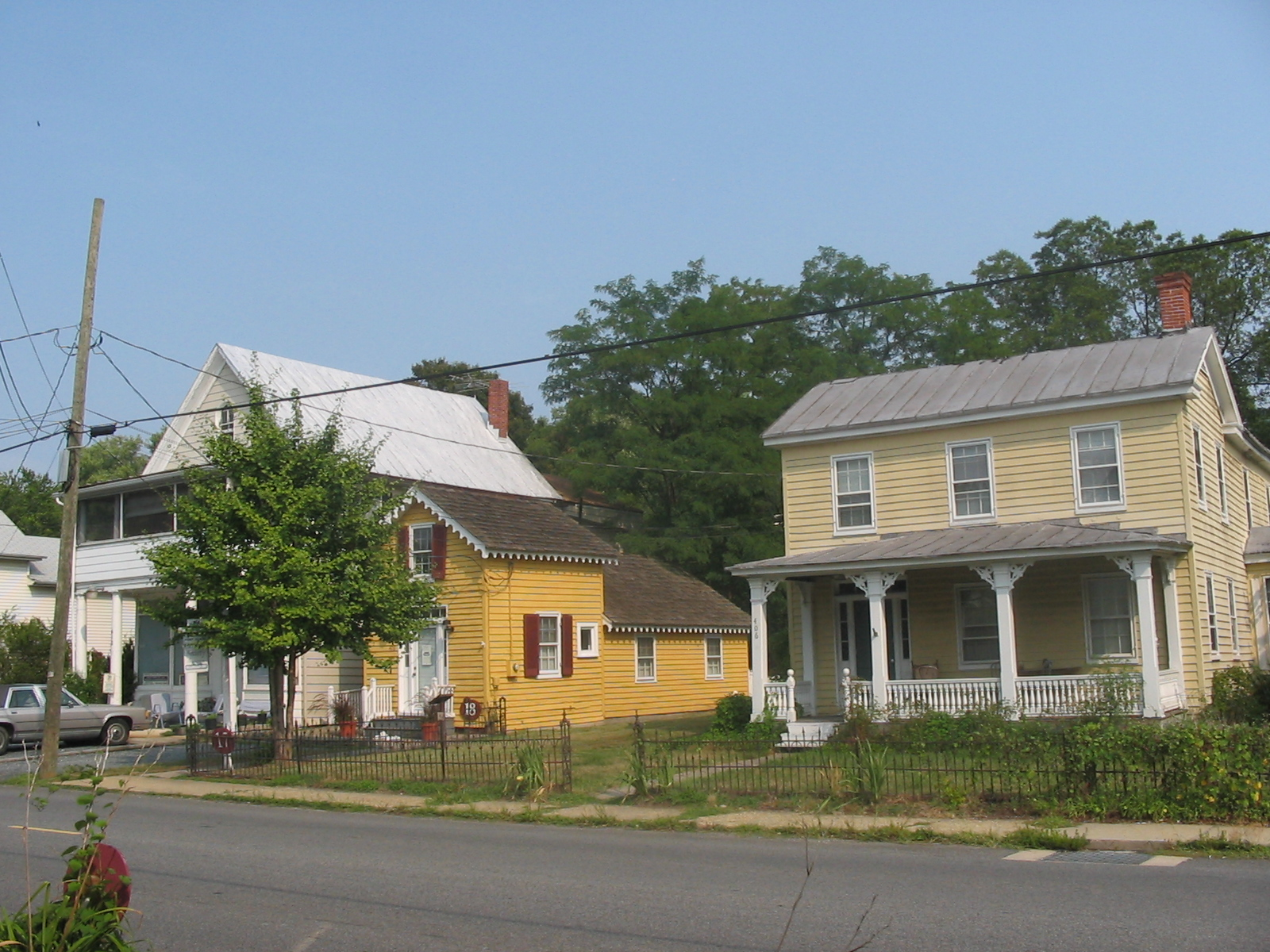
- Buildings in the Stevensville Historic District

- Location within Maryland Location within the United States
- Location: MD 18 and Love Point Rd., Stevensville, Maryland
- Coordinates: 38°58′53″N 76°18′49″W
- Area: 45 acres (18 ha)
- Built: 1850
- Architect: Baxter, Richard & Sons; Et al.
- Architectural style: Colonial Revival, Classical Revival, Queen Anne
- NRHP reference No.: 86002333
- Added to NRHP: September 11, 1986

The Stevensville Historic District, also known as Historic Stevensville, is a national historic district in downtown Stevensville, Queen Anne's County, Maryland. It contains roughly 100 historic structures, and is listed on the National Register of Historic Places. It is located primarily along East Main Street, a portion of Love Point Road, and a former section of Cockey Lane.

== Notable structures ==
=== Cray House ===
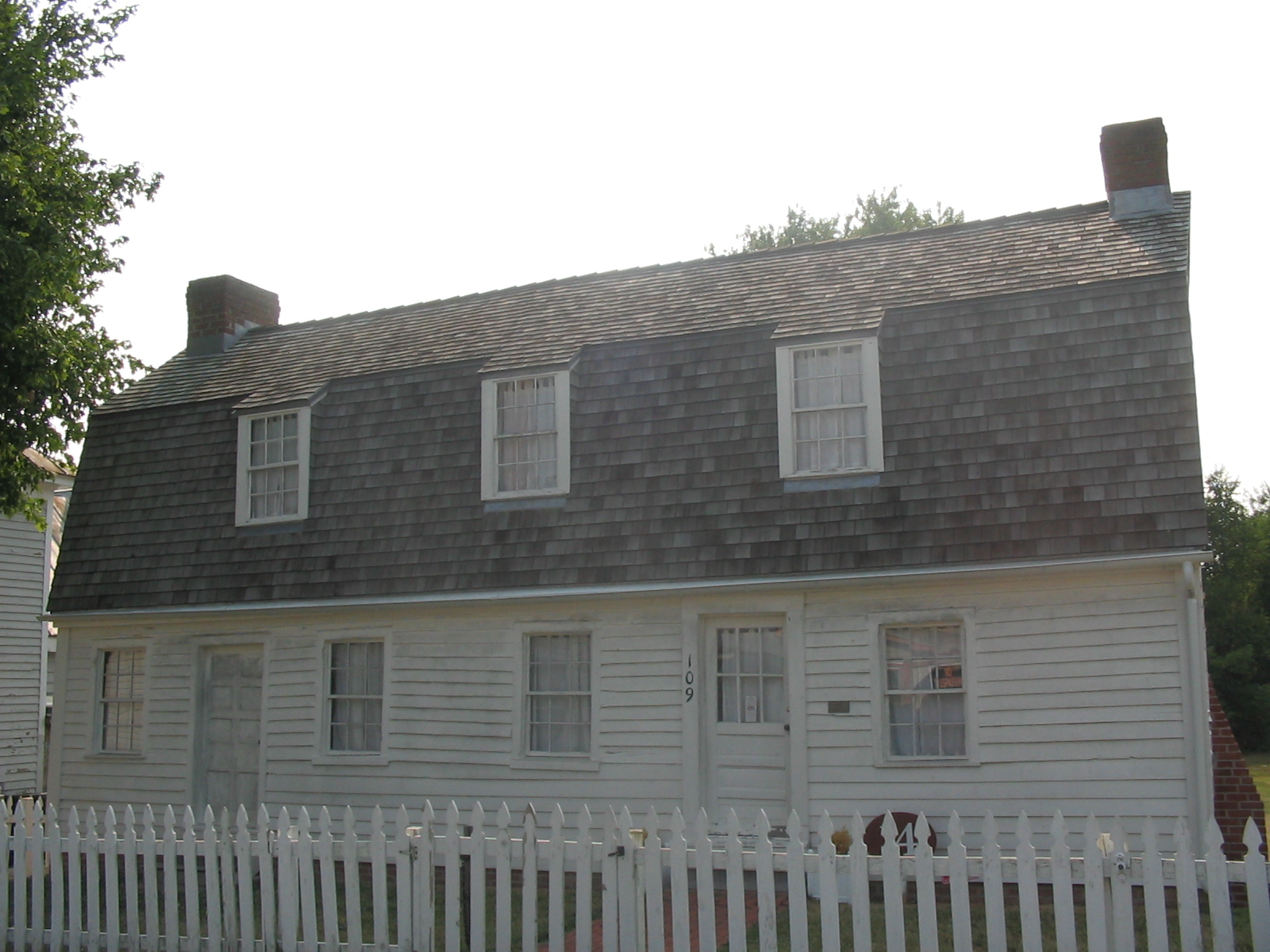
The Cray House

The Cray House, located on Cockey Lane, is the most complete example of post-and-plank construction known to exist. John Denny purchased the lot from J. Stevens in 1809. Denny, a ship carpenter, used a construction method in which walls are formed by tenoning horizontal planks into slots cut into vertical corner posts. After a series of owners, it was sold at auction in 1914 to Nora Cray, a widow who lived there with her three children. Nora Cray's heirs deeded the property to The Kent Island Heritage Society in 1976, and the house was restored in 2004. It predates the town of Stevensville, and is listed individually on the National Register of Historic Places.

=== Christ Church (1880) ===
The 1880 building of the Christ Episcopal Church of Kent Island, located on East Main Street, is the fifth church of the Christ Church parish founded in 1631, the oldest continuous Episcopal congregation in the United States. Previous church buildings were in nearby Broad Creek, one of the first towns established in Maryland. The church is an excellent example of the Queen Anne style of ecclesiastical architecture, and the building is listed individually on the National Register of Historic Places. It is now owned by the county, and as of 2008, houses a Lutheran parish and is in the process of being restored.

=== Stevensville Bank ===
The Stevensville Bank was constructed between 1903 and 1907. It opened for business in 1909, and is the predecessor to Bank of America's Tidewater Branch in Stevensville. The bank's original building is located in the historic district on Love Point Road and is listed individually on the National Register of Historic Places. The building has classical architectural details, a pressed tin ceiling, intact period furnishings and vault. Since the bank's business moved locations in the 1960s, the building has been occupied as business offices and by merchants. The Kent Island Heritage Society is the current lessee of the property.

=== Old Stevensville Post Office ===
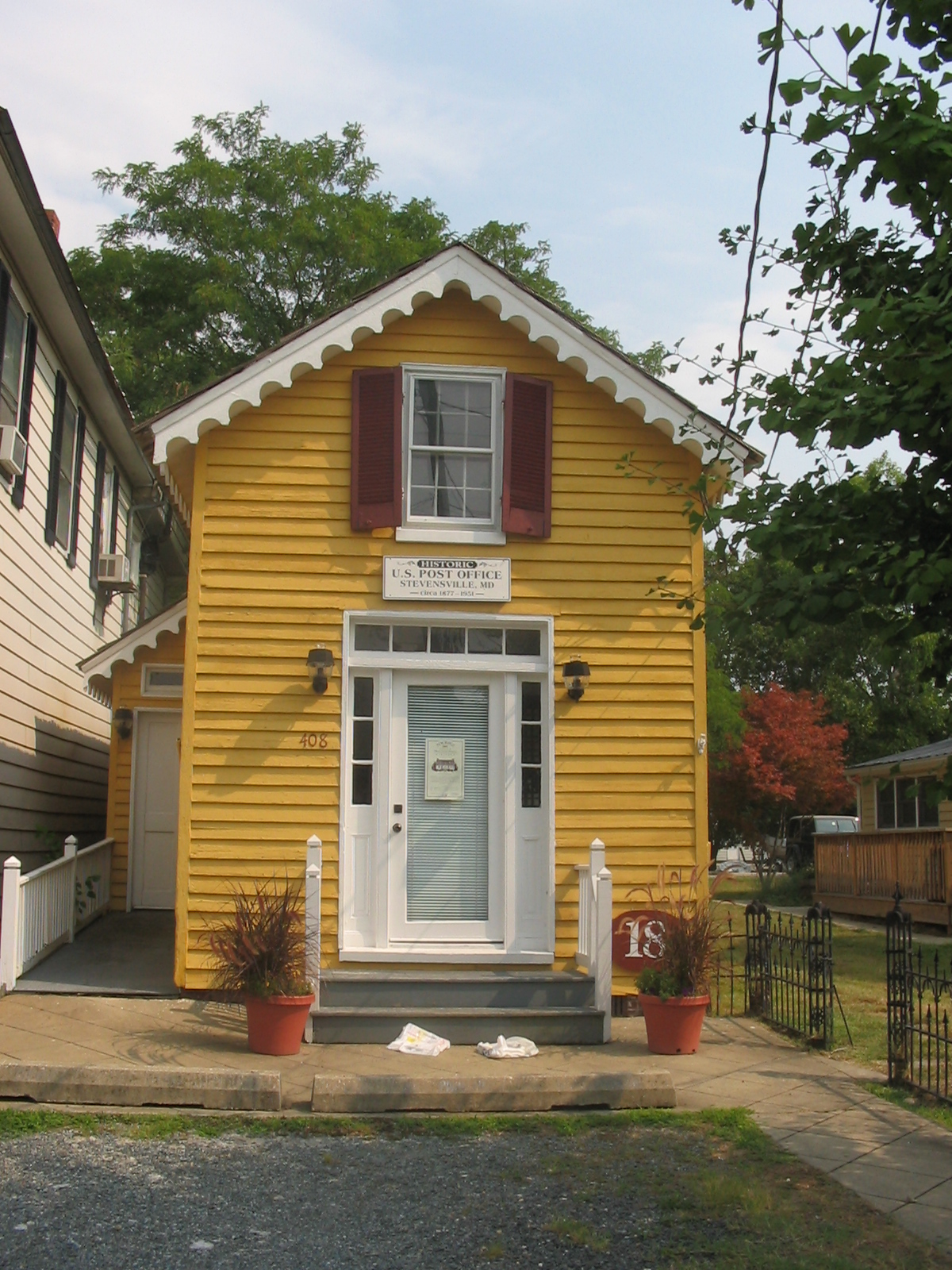
Stevensville Post Office

The old Stevensville post office is located at 408 Love Point Road. The date of construction for this building is not known, but the building does appear on an 1877 map of Stevensville. The post office was visited by Franklin D. Roosevelt during his visit to Stevensville. The Kent Island Heritage Society acquired the property in 1997.

=== Stevensville Train Depot ===
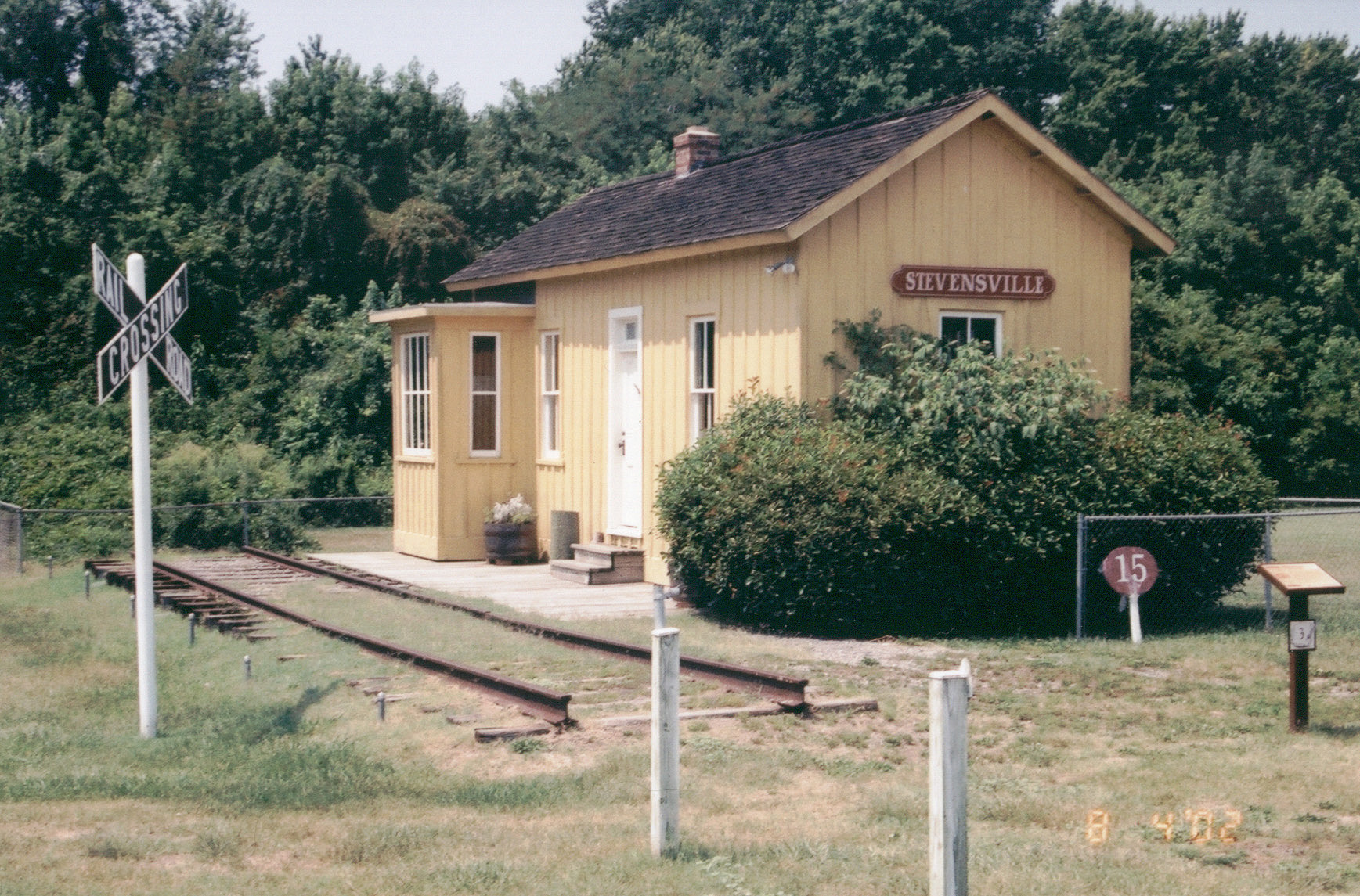
The Stevensville Train Depot as it appears today

Approval was given in 1894 by the Maryland Legislature to Queen Anne's Railroad Company to build a railroad connecting Queenstown with Lewes, Delaware. The line was extended 13 miles to Love Point in 1902, and the Stevensville Train Depot was constructed. When Maryland's Bay Bridge was constructed in 1952, the railroad line fell into disuse. The deteriorated building was donated to The Kent Island Heritage Society several years later. The structure was restored and moved to its current location on Cockey Lane in 1988.

=== Cockey House ===
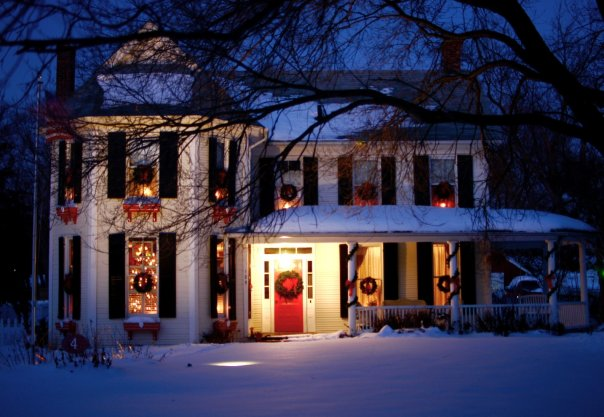
The Historic Cockey House

The Cockey House, built ca. 1870, was originally owned by Charles B. Downes. An 1877 map identifies it as the parsonage for the First Methodist Protestant Church, which rented it until a new parsonage was built next to the church. [See Site 20.] Miss Mary Cockey, an elementary school teacher, and her father, James Cockey, assistant postmaster in Stevensville, bought the house in the early 1900s. She used it as the local library for many years, had an addition built on the west side, and enlarged the front porch. The house is being restored to its historic splendor by its current owners.
