= Stevensville Bank =

- U.S. National Register of Historic Places
- U.S. Historic district – Contributing property
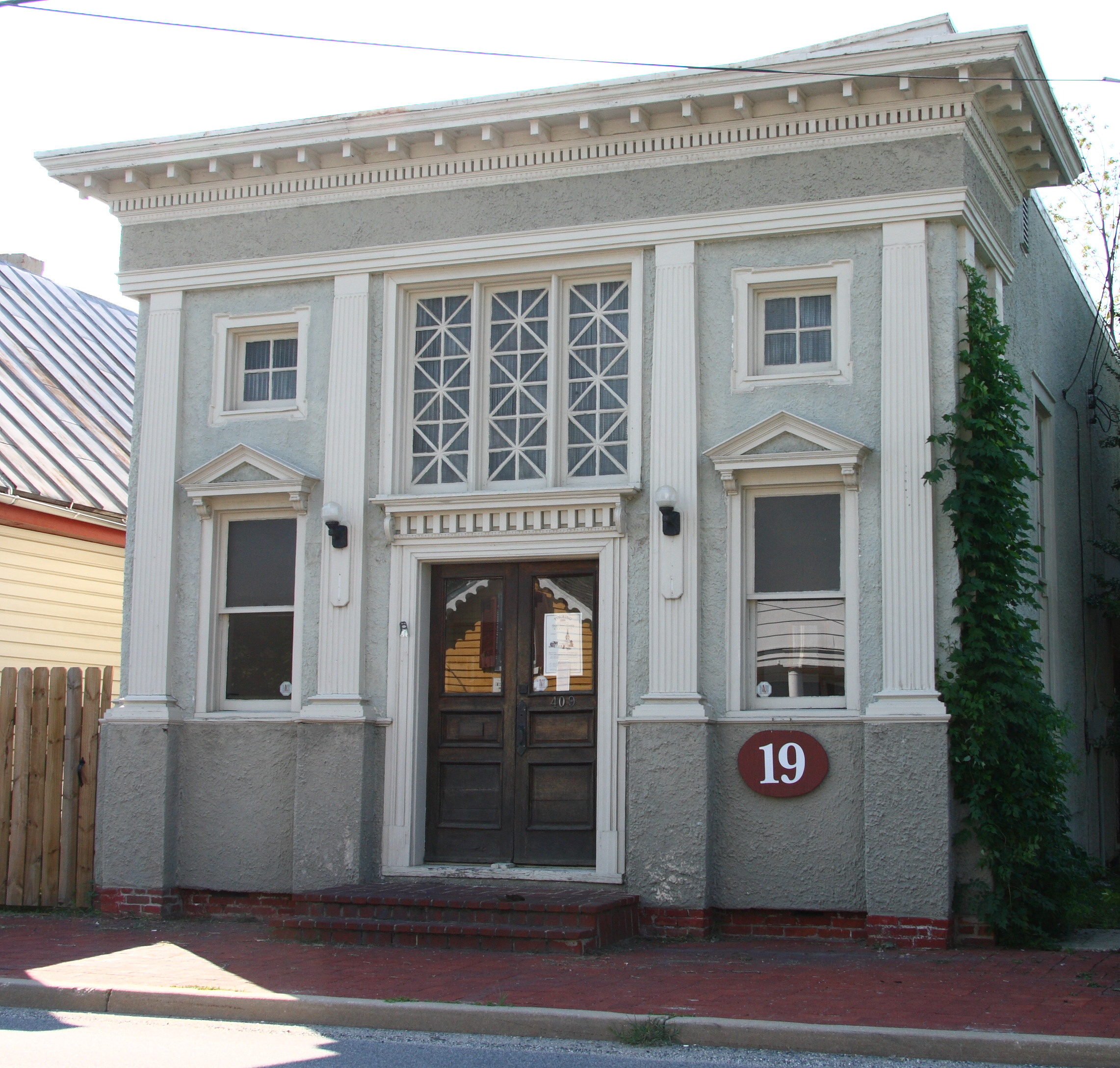
- Stevensville Bank building, July 2008

- Location within Maryland Location within the United States
- Location: Love Point Rd., Stevensville, Maryland
- Coordinates: 38°58′52.9″N 76°18′52.9″W
- Area: 0.1 acres (0.040 ha)
- Built: 1903
- NRHP reference No.: 85000020
- Added to NRHP: January 3, 1985

The Stevensville Bank is a historic bank building located near the center of Stevensville, Maryland, United States, and is in the Stevensville Historic District. The building's name is a reference to Stevensville Savings Bank which once occupied the building. The classically detailed bank is now used as a law office.

It was listed on the National Register of Historic Places in 1985.

== Stevensville Savings Bank ==
Stevensville Savings Bank was the bank that occupied the building until the 1960s. At that time, the bank moved near a strip mall at the edge of Stevensville and changed its name to Tidewater Bank. Tidewater Bank later merged with larger banks; in recent years it has been owned by Nations Bank and Bank of America. The Tidewater Bank building continues to serve as a Bank of America branch known as the Tidewater Branch.
