= Kent Fort, Maryland =

Human settlement in "Kent Island, Maryland", Maryland, US

Kent Fort
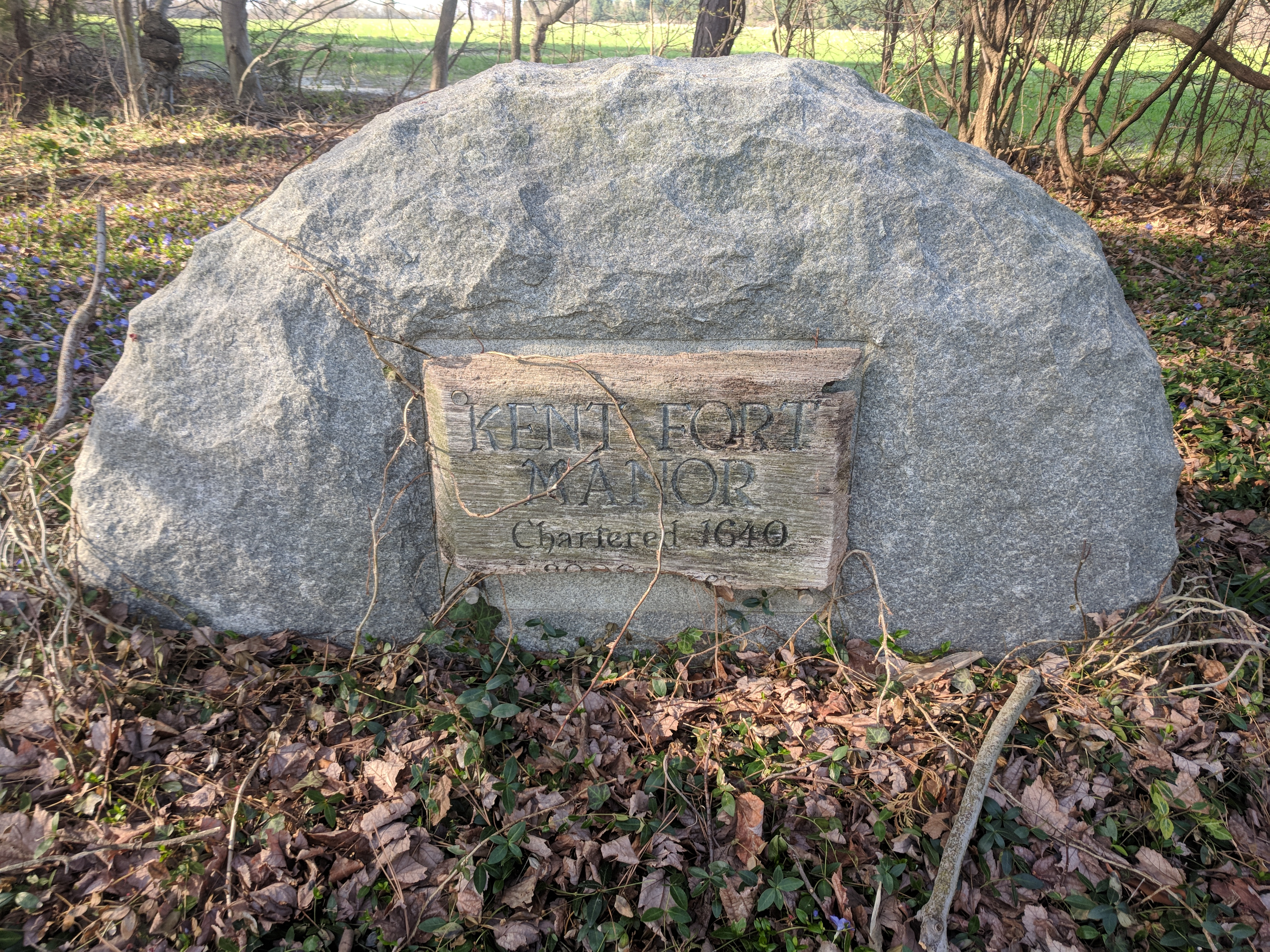
- A stoner marker on Kent Island, near the historic location of the fort.

- Location within Maryland Kent Fort, Maryland (the United States)

General information
- Location: Kent Island, Maryland, USA
- Coordinates: 38.84°N 76.37°W
- Completed: 1631

Kent Fort was a fort and settlement located near 38.84°N 76.37°W on southern Kent Island in colonial Virginia and later Maryland, and was the first English settlement within the boundaries of present-day Maryland and the fourth oldest permanent English settlement in the United States, after Jamestown, Virginia (1607), Hampton, Virginia (1609–10), and Plymouth, Massachusetts (1620). The fort was established by William Claiborne in 1631, and was a central part of early Kent Island. Claiborne made Kent Fort into a trading post with the Matapeake people, the Indigenous tribe of the island. Beads imported from Italy were given to the Matapeake people in exchange for furs. By the end of the century, however, activity had shifted northward to the port town of Broad Creek.

Today, the land on which the fort once stood has been eroded into the Eastern Bay, and the only known traces of the settlement are well bases in the bay. A stone marker marks where the settlement was located, and Kent Fort Manor is also located at the site of the Kent Fort settlement.

The colony was located on Eastern Bay between two present-day piers and down Kent Fort Road. Three wooden wells were located approximately 75 feet off shore and other artifacts were found in the vicinity. Notable were blue Indian trade beads which dated to 1631 from other sites. Also found were melted beads which were probably in a fire recorded in the store house which burned on October 17, 1631.
