= Stevensville, Maryland =

- CDP
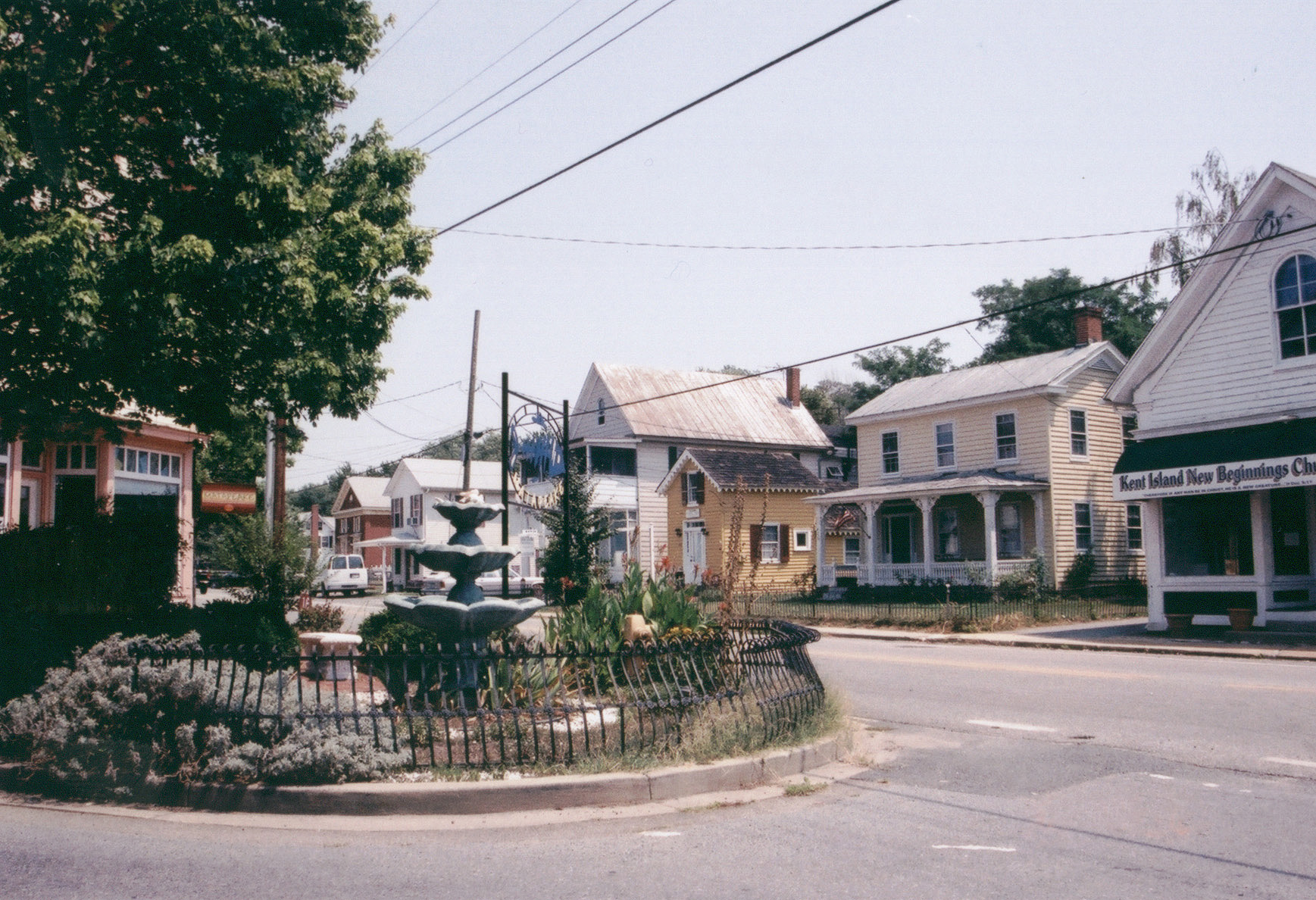
- Downtown Stevensville

- Coordinates: 38°58′52″N 76°19′8″W
- Country: United States
- State: Maryland
- County: Queen Anne's

Area
  - Total: 6.44 sq mi (16.68 km^{2})
  - Land: 6.44 sq mi (16.68 km^{2})
  - Water: 0 sq mi (0.00 km^{2})
- Elevation: 6.6 ft (2 m)

Population (2020)
  - Total: 7,442
  - Density: 1,155.3/sq mi (446.06/km^{2})
- Time zone: UTC−5 (Eastern (EST))
  - Summer (DST): UTC−4 (EDT)
- ZIP code: 21666
- Area code: 410
- FIPS code: 24-75025
- GNIS feature ID: 0598122

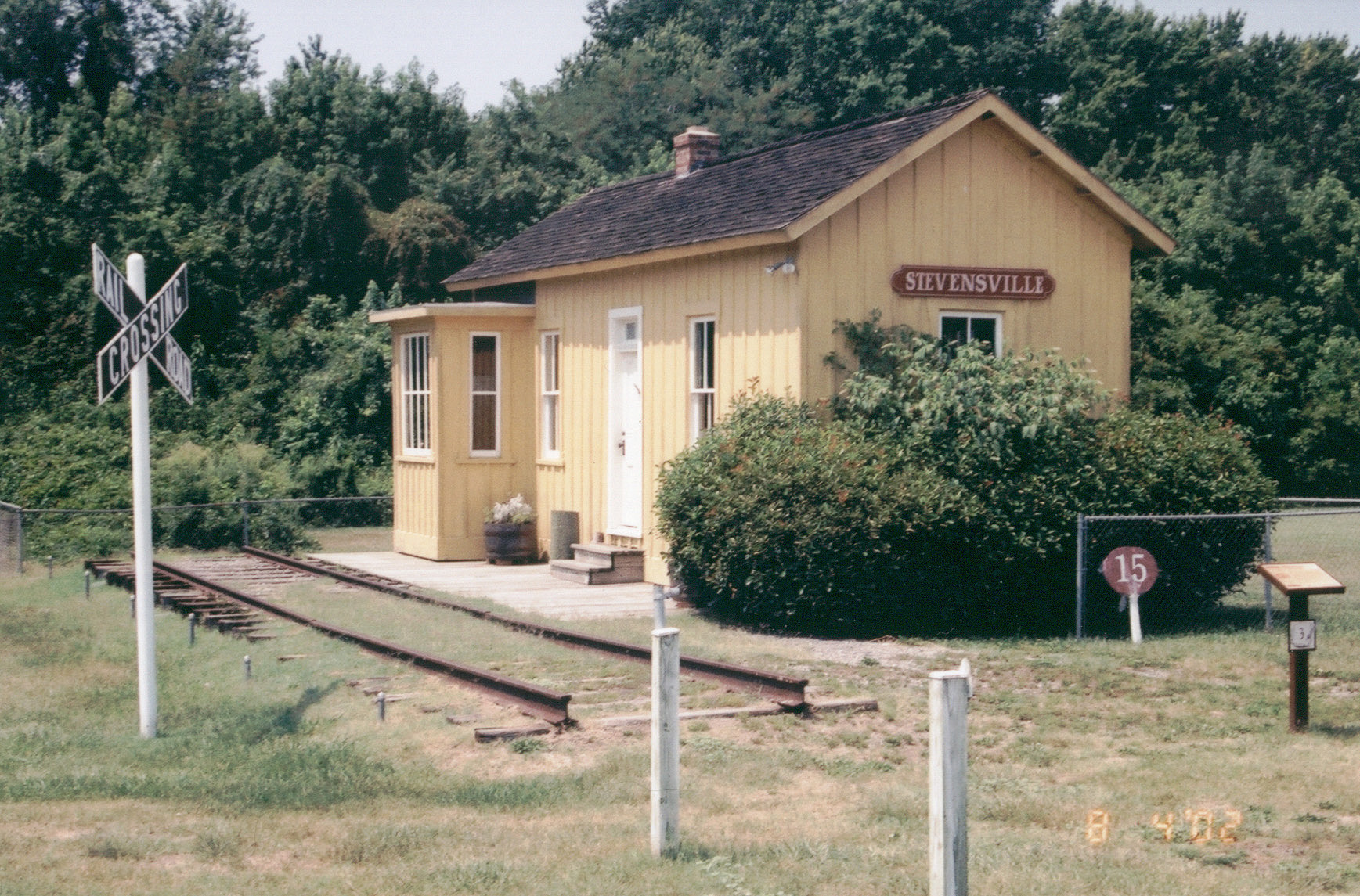
A restored 1902 train station

Stevensville is a census-designated place (CDP) in Queen Anne's County, Maryland, United States, and is the county's most populous place among both CDPs and municipalities. The community is the eastern terminus of the Chesapeake Bay Bridge. The Stevensville Historic District is one of two registered historic districts in the county, the other being the Centreville Historic District.

== History ==
Stevensville was founded in 1850 as a steamboat terminal. Today, the Stevensville Historic District contains roughly 100 historic structures dating back to the town's early days.

In addition to the Stevensville Historic District, the Christ Church, Cray House, Friendship, Legg's Dependence, Mattapax, and Stevensville Bank are listed on the National Register of Historic Places.

On July 24, 2017, an EF2 tornado hit Stevensville, causing damage to homes, trees, and power lines and injuring one person.

== Geography ==
Stevensville is located at 38°58′52″N 76°19′8″W (38.981128, −76.318757). According to the U.S. Census Bureau, it has a total area of 6.1 square miles (16 km^{2}), all land.

=== Climate ===
The climate in this area is characterized by hot, humid summers and generally mild to cool winters. According to the Köppen Climate Classification system, Stevensville has a humid subtropical climate, abbreviated "Cfa" on climate maps.

Climate data for Stevensville, Maryland (1991–2020 normals, extremes 1926–1942, 1952–1960, 2000–present)
Month	Jan	Feb	Mar	Apr	May	Jun	Jul	Aug	Sep	Oct	Nov	Dec	Year
Record high °F (°C)	75 (24)	83 (28)	89 (32)	92 (33)	96 (36)	100 (38)	103 (39)	100 (38)	97 (36)	98 (37)	82 (28)	71 (22)	101 (38)
Mean daily maximum °F (°C)	42.1 (5.6)	44.2 (6.8)	51.9 (11.1)	63.9 (17.7)	73.4 (23.0)	83.1 (28.4)	87.4 (30.8)	85.4 (29.7)	78.2 (25.7)	67.5 (19.7)	55.6 (13.1)	45.7 (7.6)	64.9 (18.3)
Daily mean °F (°C)	35.4 (1.9)	36.9 (2.7)	43.9 (6.6)	54.9 (12.7)	64.5 (18.1)	74.7 (23.7)	79.5 (26.4)	77.4 (25.2)	70.6 (21.4)	59.1 (15.1)	48.3 (9.1)	39.7 (4.3)	57.1 (13.9)
Mean daily minimum °F (°C)	28.6 (−1.9)	29.7 (−1.3)	36.0 (2.2)	45.9 (7.7)	55.7 (13.2)	66.3 (19.1)	71.5 (21.9)	69.3 (20.7)	62.9 (17.2)	50.8 (10.4)	41.1 (5.1)	33.7 (0.9)	49.3 (9.6)
Record low °F (°C)	−1 (−18)	−9 (−23)	8 (−13)	28 (−2)	34 (1)	40 (4)	48 (9)	48 (9)	40 (4)	25 (−4)	12 (−11)	7 (−14)	−9 (−23)
Average precipitation inches (mm)	3.03 (77)	3.06 (78)	4.04 (103)	3.35 (85)	4.24 (108)	4.12 (105)	4.71 (120)	4.35 (110)	4.47 (114)	4.48 (114)	3.26 (83)	3.80 (97)	46.91 (1,192)
Source: NOAA

== Demographics ==
Historical population
Census	Pop.	Note	%±
2010	6,803		—
2020	7,442		9.4%
U.S. Decennial Census

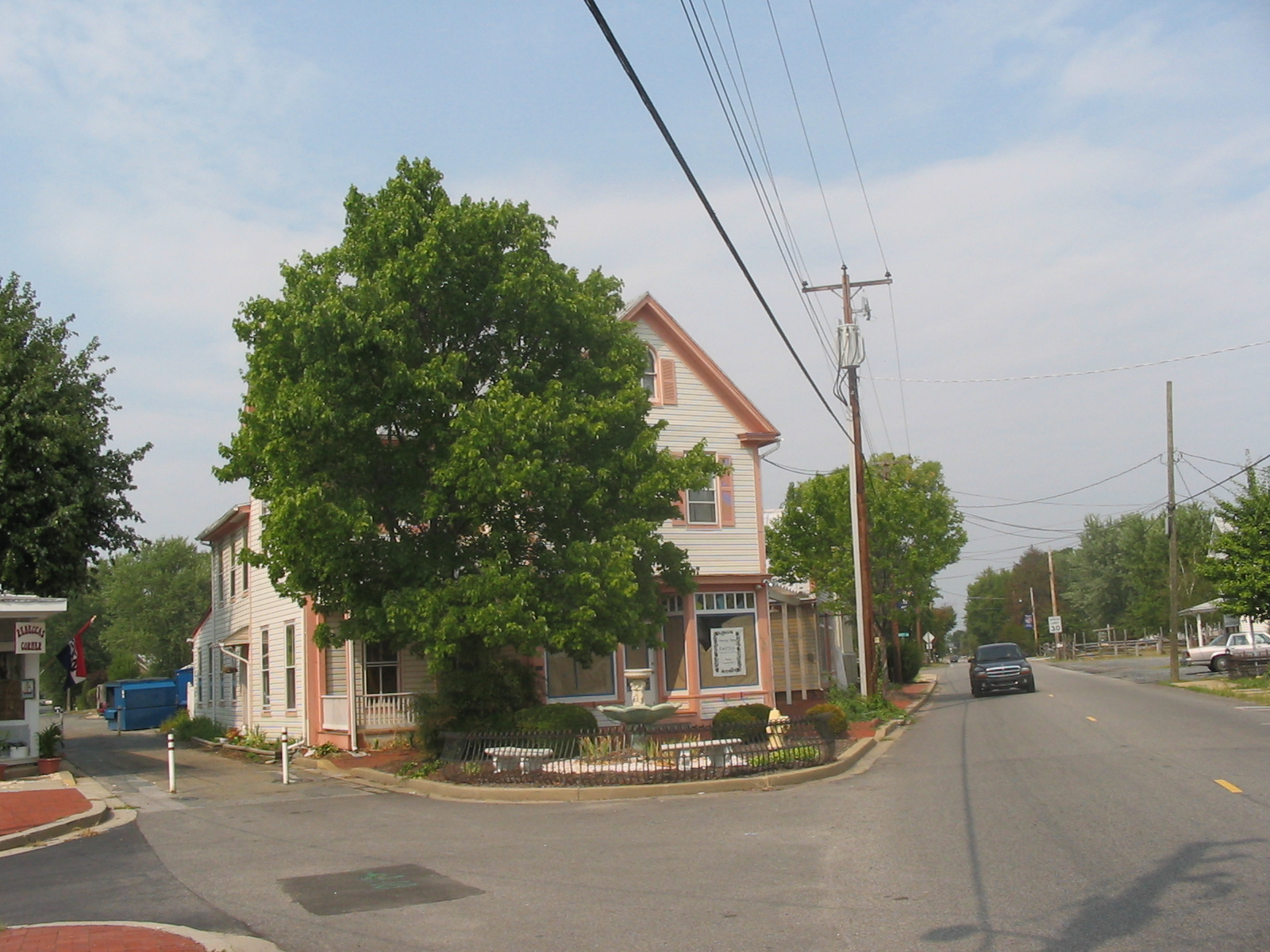
Downtown Stevensville in August 2007

=== 2020 census ===
As of the 2020 census, Stevensville had a population of 7,442. The median age was 42.0 years. 23.0% of residents were under the age of 18 and 15.3% of residents were 65 years of age or older. For every 100 females there were 97.7 males, and for every 100 females age 18 and over there were 92.6 males age 18 and over.

100.0% of residents lived in urban areas, while 0.0% lived in rural areas.

There were 2,757 households in Stevensville, of which 34.9% had children under the age of 18 living in them. Of all households, 59.4% were married-couple households, 13.5% were households with a male householder and no spouse or partner present, and 19.6% were households with a female householder and no spouse or partner present. About 20.8% of all households were made up of individuals and 10.6% had someone living alone who was 65 years of age or older.

There were 2,897 housing units, of which 4.8% were vacant. The homeowner vacancy rate was 1.3% and the rental vacancy rate was 6.3%.

Racial composition as of the 2020 census
Race	Number	Percent
White	6,587	88.5%
Black or African American	161	2.2%
American Indian and Alaska Native	10	0.1%
Asian	144	1.9%
Native Hawaiian and Other Pacific Islander	2	0.0%
Some other race	115	1.5%
Two or more races	423	5.7%
Hispanic or Latino (of any race)	238	3.2%

=== 2010 census ===
As of the census of 2010, there were 6,803 people and 2,644 households residing in the CDP. The population density was 1,057.1 people per square mile. The racial makeup of the CDP was 93.81% White, 2.32% African American, 0.28% American Indian, 1.57% Asian, 0.73% from other races, and 1.57% from two or more races. Hispanic or Latino of any race accounted for 2.85% of the population.

Of 2,396 occupied households, 77.4% had children under the age of 18 living with them, 63.4% were married couples living together, 9.6% had a female householder with no husband present, and 22.6% were non-families. 16.7% of all households were made up of individuals, and 5.1% had someone living alone who was 65 years of age or older. The average household size was 2.84 and the average family size was 3.21.

In the CDP, the population was spread out, with 27.5% under the age of 18, 7.5% from 18 to 24, 26.9% from 25 to 44, 30% from 45 to 64, and 8.1% who were 65 years of age or older. The median age was 39.4 years. For every 100 females, there were 100.8 males.

=== Income and poverty ===
The American Community Survey estimated the median income for a household in the CDP was $105,023 in 2018 U.S. dollars, and the median income for a family was $107,169. Male householders with no wife present had a median income of $83,389 versus $78,281 for female householders with no husbands present. The per capita income for the CDP was $40,292. About 1.6% of families and 4.3% of the population were below the poverty line, including 0.8% of those under age 18 and 4.5% of those age 65 or over.

== Education ==
The Queen Anne's County Public Schools includes the Kent Island High School.

== Notable people ==
- Brock Adams, former U.S. Secretary of Transportation and U.S. senator
- Jay Fleming, photographer
- Luke Kleintank, actor
- Frank Kratovil, former U.S. congressman
- Edward Pipkin, former Maryland state senator
- Frank E. Petersen, first African-American Marine Corps aviator and first African-American Marine Corps general
- Paul Reed Smith, founder of PRS Guitars and luthier

== Aviation ==
- Bay Bridge Airport (W29) is a small, county owned, public landing strip in Stevensville, overlooking the Chesapeake Bay Bridge. Many private airplanes take off and land there every day.
- Kentmorr Airpark (3W3) is a small airpark community adjacent to Kentmorr Marina.
