= Corcoran (surname) =

Corcoran Ó Corcráin MacCorcráin
- Pronunciation: /ˈkɔːrkərən/ KOR-kər-ən
- Language: Irish

Origin
- Meaning: Anglicisation of Ó Corcráin or MacCorcorán, which is taken from corcair meaning 'purple'
- Region of origin: Ireland

Other names
- Variant forms: Cochrane, Coughran, MacCorcoran, Corcorran

Corcoran is an Irish surname, the original Irish language form being Ó Corcráin meaning 'descendant of Corcrán' and MacCorcráin from Leinster meaning son of Corcrán. The name itself is derived from corcair meaning 'purple'.

== History ==
The name Corcoran is an anglicisation of the names of two Gaelic clans. The first was the Ó Corcráin in Ulster. The second was the MacCorcráin clan from Leinster, which was a sept of Ó Corcráin.

Related variations of the name Corcoran historically include MacCorcoran, O'Corcoran, and Corcorran. The Corcorans were predominantly from Fermanagh and included a number of figures of historical importance such as the Bishop of Clogher in 1370 and Edmund O'Corcoran, "the hero of Limerick" (from the siege of 1691).

Many Corcorans become members of the clergy between the tenth and fifteenth centuries; they became based around the vicinity of Lough Erne, County Fermanagh, in Ulster. One member of the family, John Corcoran, was appointed Bishop of Clogher in 1373.

The O'Corcrain territory was invaded by the Normans in 1170 AD.

During the Plantation of Ulster and the Cromwellian conquest of Ireland in 1649 AD, the Corcorans were scattered. Many settled on lands in Connaught, Munster, and Leinster. Principally Offaly, Tipperary, and Galway where the MacCorcorans had settled previously.

== Modern ==
Today the surname is used throughout Ireland and throughout the Irish diaspora.

== Notable people ==
Notable people with the surname Corcoran include:

- Angela Corcoran (born 1967), Australian diplomat
- Ann Corcoran (politician) (born 1951), Australian politician
- Ann Corcoran (activist), American blogger and activist
- Annette Corcoran (born 1930), American ceramist
- Anthony Corcoran (born 1963), American-born Roman Catholic bishop in Kyrgyzstan
- Barbara Corcoran (born 1949), American real estate mogul, entrepreneur, and investor on ABC's Shark Tank
- Brian Corcoran (born 1973), former Irish sportsman
- Danny Corcoran (disambiguation), several people
- Des Corcoran (1929–2004), Australian politician
- Donna Corcoran (born 1942), American former child actress
- Éamonn Corcoran (born 1978), former Irish sportsman
- Evan Corcoran (born 1964), American lawyer
- Farrel Corcoran, author and academic
- Frank Corcoran (born 1944), Irish composer
- Fred Corcoran (1905–1977), World Golf Hall of Famer
- Imelda Corcoran, Australian actress
- James Corcoran (disambiguation), several people
- Jerry Corcoran (1893–1981), American football player and executive
- Jim Corcoran (born 1949), Canadian musician
- Jimmy Corcoran (1819–1900), gangster
- John Corcoran (disambiguation), several people
- Joseph Corcoran (1975–2024), American executed mass murderer
- Josephine Mackie Corcoran (1894–1967), American politician from Maryland
- Kara Corcoran, American military officer
- Kevin Corcoran (1949–2015), American director, producer, and former child actor
- Larry Corcoran (1859–1891), American pitcher in Major League Baseball
- Michael Corcoran (disambiguation), several people
- Michael Corcoran (1827–1863), American general and close confidant of Abraham Lincoln during the American Civil War
- Niall Corcoran, Irish sportsman
- Noreen Corcoran (1943–2016), American actress
- Ray Corcoran, Australian rugby league footballer
- Thomas Corcoran (disambiguation), several people
- Timothy Corcoran (disambiguation), several people
- William Corcoran Eustis (1862–1921), wealthy inhabitant of Washington, D.C., and grandson of William Wilson Corcoran
- William Wilson Corcoran (1798–1888), American banker, philanthropist, and art collector

Notable people with the variant surname Ó Corcrán include:

- Brian Ó Corcrán (died 1624?), poet
- Cahalan Ó Corcrán (died 1001), Abbot
- Felimidh Ó Corcrán (died 1522), Canon lawyer
- Fláithrí Ó Corcrán (died 1496), singer and harpist
- Johannes O Corcoran OSB (died c. 1389), Bishop of Clogher

== See also ==
- Cochrane (surname)
- Corkran (surname)
