= Home Away from Home =

A home away from home is a place in which one is as comfortable as one's actual home.

Home Away from Home may also refer to:

== Music ==
- Home Away from Home, the first full-length album by Irish singer-songwriter Vincent Cross
- "Home Away from Home", a song from the 1971 Jerry Lee Lewis album There Must Be More to Love Than This
- "Home Away from Home", a song from the 1982 Lee Greenwood album Inside Out
- "Home Away from Home", a song from the 1986 Willie Nelson album Partners

== Other ==
- Home Away from Home (TV series)
- Home Away from Home, a program aired on Canadian TV network Fine Living
- Home Away from Home, a 2014 Filipino TV series broadcast by GMA Pinoy TV
- Home Away from Home, a 1962 non-fiction book by American writer Jack Woodford
