= Corcoran =

Corcoran may refer to:

== People ==
- Corcoran (surname), a surname of Irish origin

== Places ==
- Corcoran, California, United States
- Corcoran, Minnesota, United States
- Corcoran, Minneapolis, Minnesota, a neighborhood in Minneapolis, United States
- Corcoran Woods, 210 acres (85 ha) donated by Edward S. Corcoran to the State of Maryland, US

== Educational institutions ==
- Corcoran High School, Syracuse, NY, United States
- Corcoran School of the Arts and Design, Washington, DC, United States
- Corcoran Departments of History and Philosophy, University of Virginia, United States
- Corcoran Hall, The George Washington University, historic site in Washington, DC, United States

== Other uses ==
- California State Prison, Corcoran, located in California, United States
- California Substance Abuse Treatment Facility and State Prison, Corcoran, state prison in Corcoran, California, United States
- Corcoran Gallery of Art in Washington, DC, United States
- Corcoran Group, a real estate firm based in Manhattan, United States
- Fort Corcoran in northern Virginia, American Civil War structure
- Lake Corcoran, a former lake in the Central Valley of California
- Mount Corcoran, a summit in the Sierra Nevada range of California
