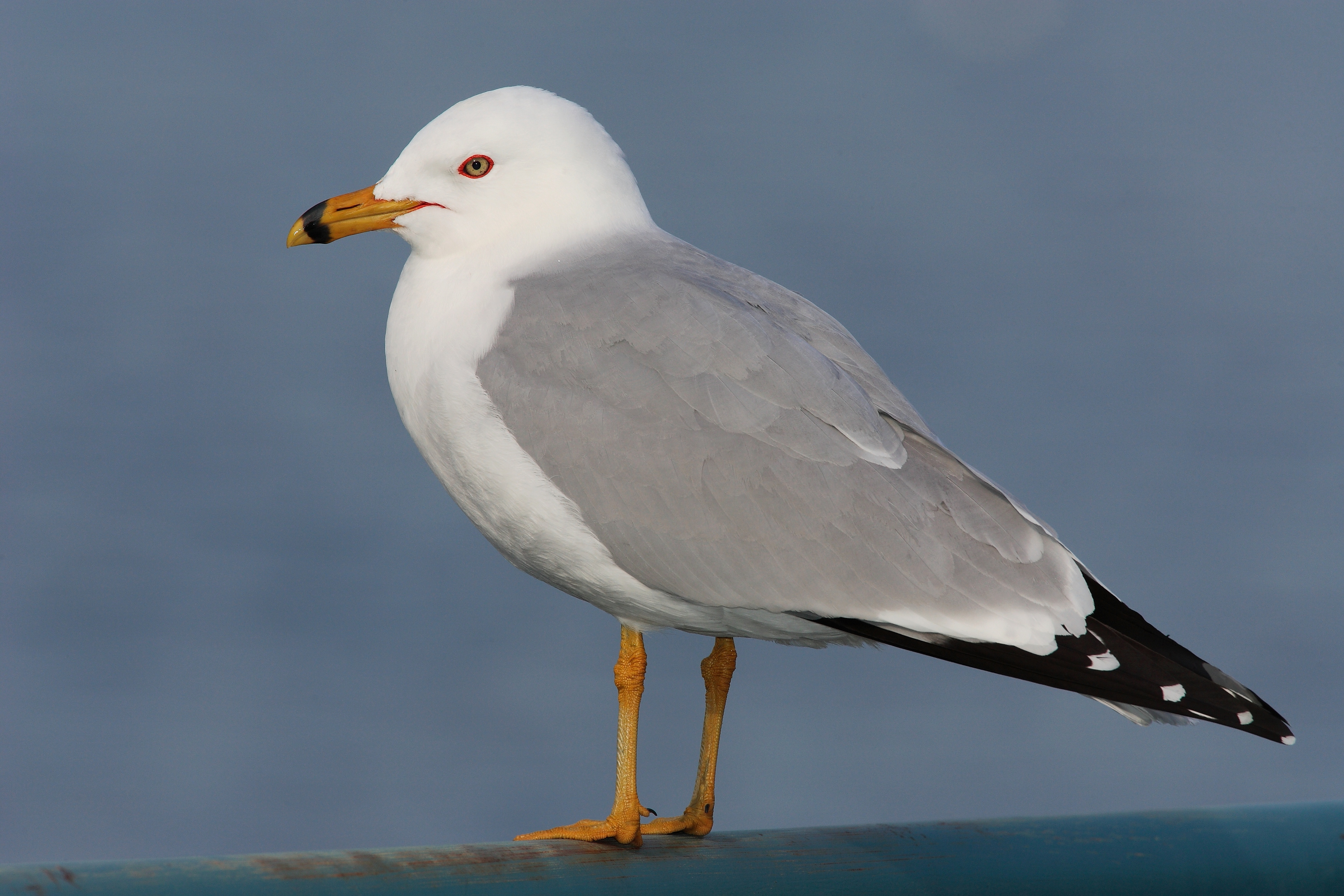
- Breeding adult in Toronto, Ontario, Canada
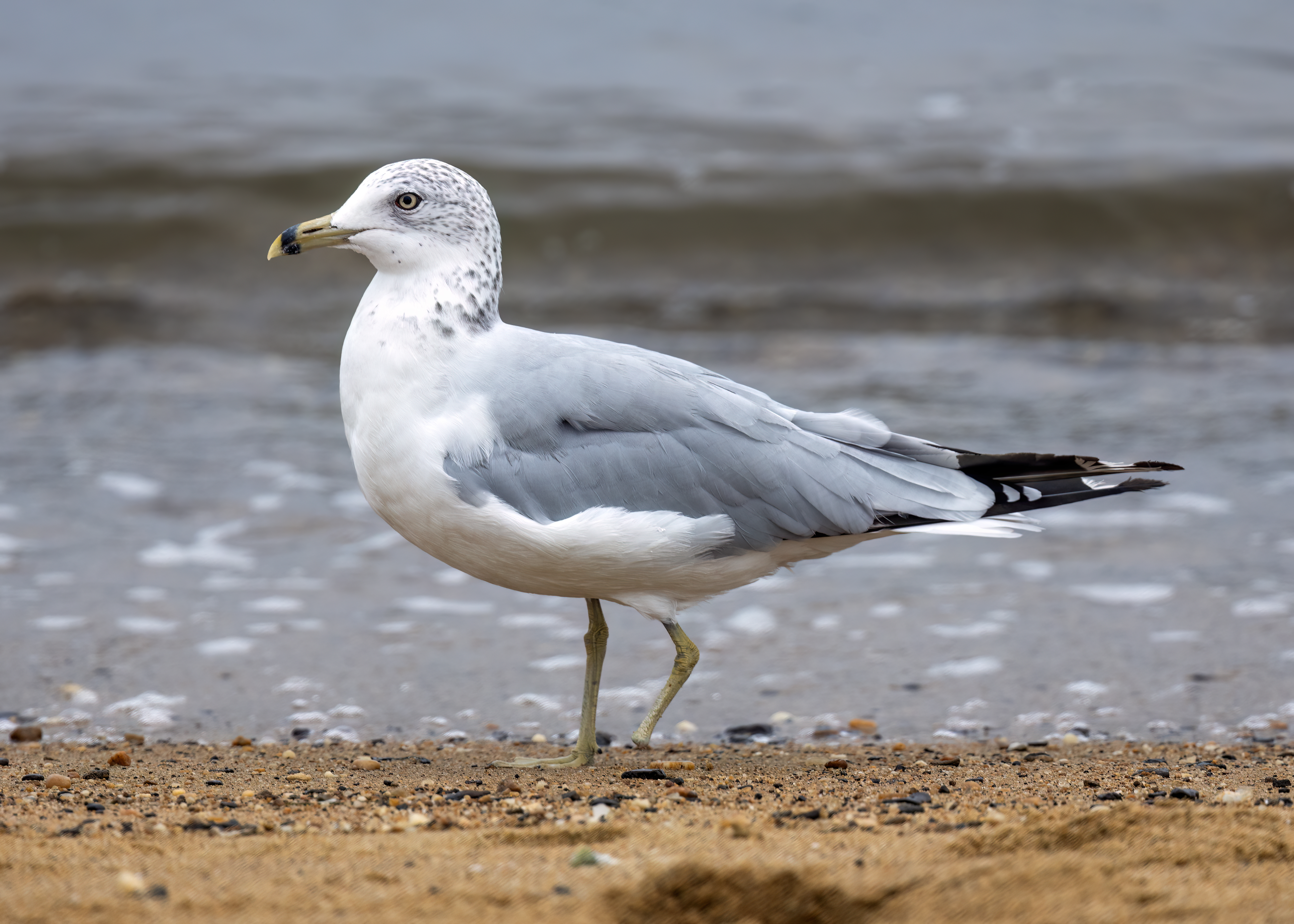
- Non-breeding adult at Sandy Point State Park, Maryland

Conservation status
- Least Concern (IUCN 3.1)

Scientific classification
- Kingdom: Animalia
- Phylum: Chordata
- Class: Aves
- Order: Charadriiformes
- Family: Laridae
- Genus: Larus
- Species: L. delawarensis

Binomial name
- Larus delawarensis Ord, 1815

= Ring-billed gull =

Species of bird

The ring-billed gull (Larus delawarensis) is a medium-sized gull native to North America, breeding in Canada and the northern Contiguous United States, and wintering mainly in the United States and northern Mexico. The genus name is from Latin Larus which appears to have referred to a gull or other large seabird. The specific delawarensis refers to the Delaware River.

== Description ==
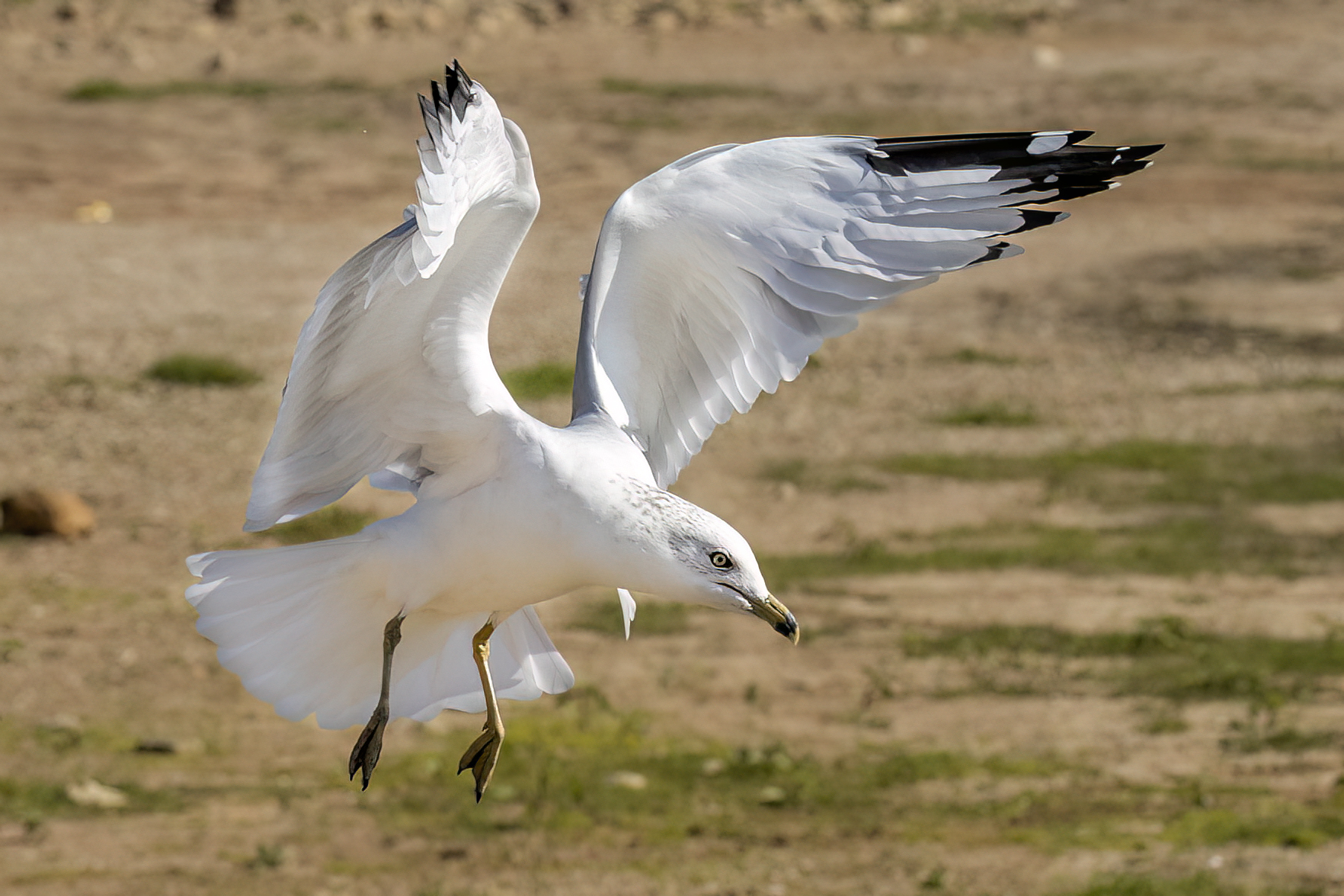
A winter plumage ring-billed gull in flight at Black Butte Lake, California

The ring-billed gull is a medium-sized gull, having an average length of 43 to 54 centimetres (16.9 to 21.3 in) and a wingspan that ranges from 105 to 117 centimetres (41.3 to 46.1 in). Adults weigh from 300 to 700 grams (10.6 to 24.7 oz).

The head, neck and underparts are white; the relatively short bill is yellow with a black ring; the back and wings are silver grey with black wingtips with white 'mirrors'; and the legs are yellow. The eyes are yellow with red rims. This gull takes three years to reach its breeding plumage starting with the largely brown juvenile plumage, its appearance changing with each fall moult.

The average lifespan of an individual that reaches adulthood is 10.9 years. The oldest ring-billed gull on record was observed in Cleveland in 2021, still alive at the age of 28 years.

== Distribution and habitat ==
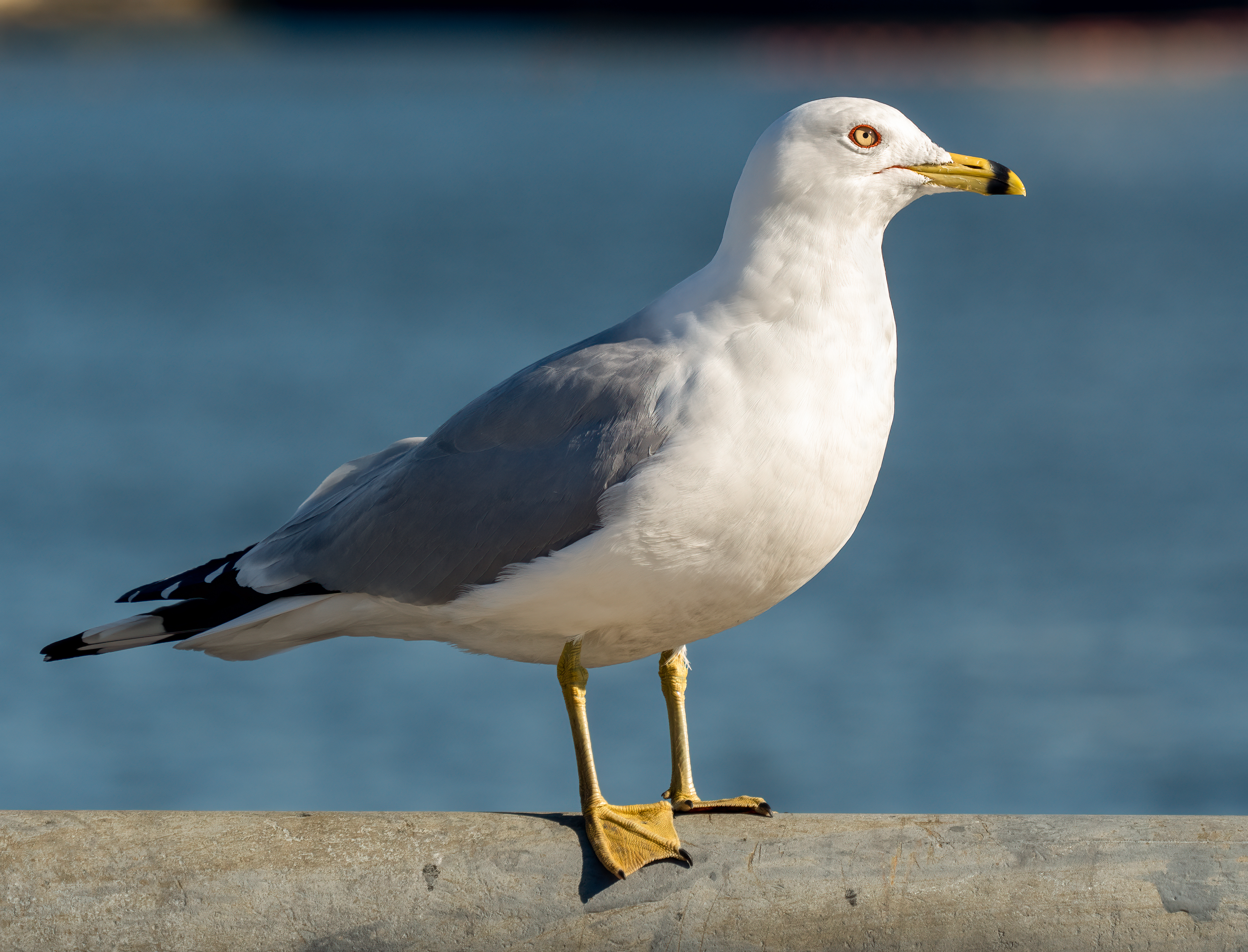
Adult in New York

Sounds of a colony
Ring-billed gulls vocalizing in a colony

The breeding habitat is near lakes, rivers, or the coast across most of Canada, and the northern United States. They nest colonially on the ground, often on islands, but also increasingly on flat factory roofs. This bird tends to be faithful to its nesting site, if not its mate, from year to year.

The ring-billed gull is a familiar sight in North American parking lots, where it can regularly be found congregating in large numbers. In some areas, it is displacing less aggressive birds such as the common tern.

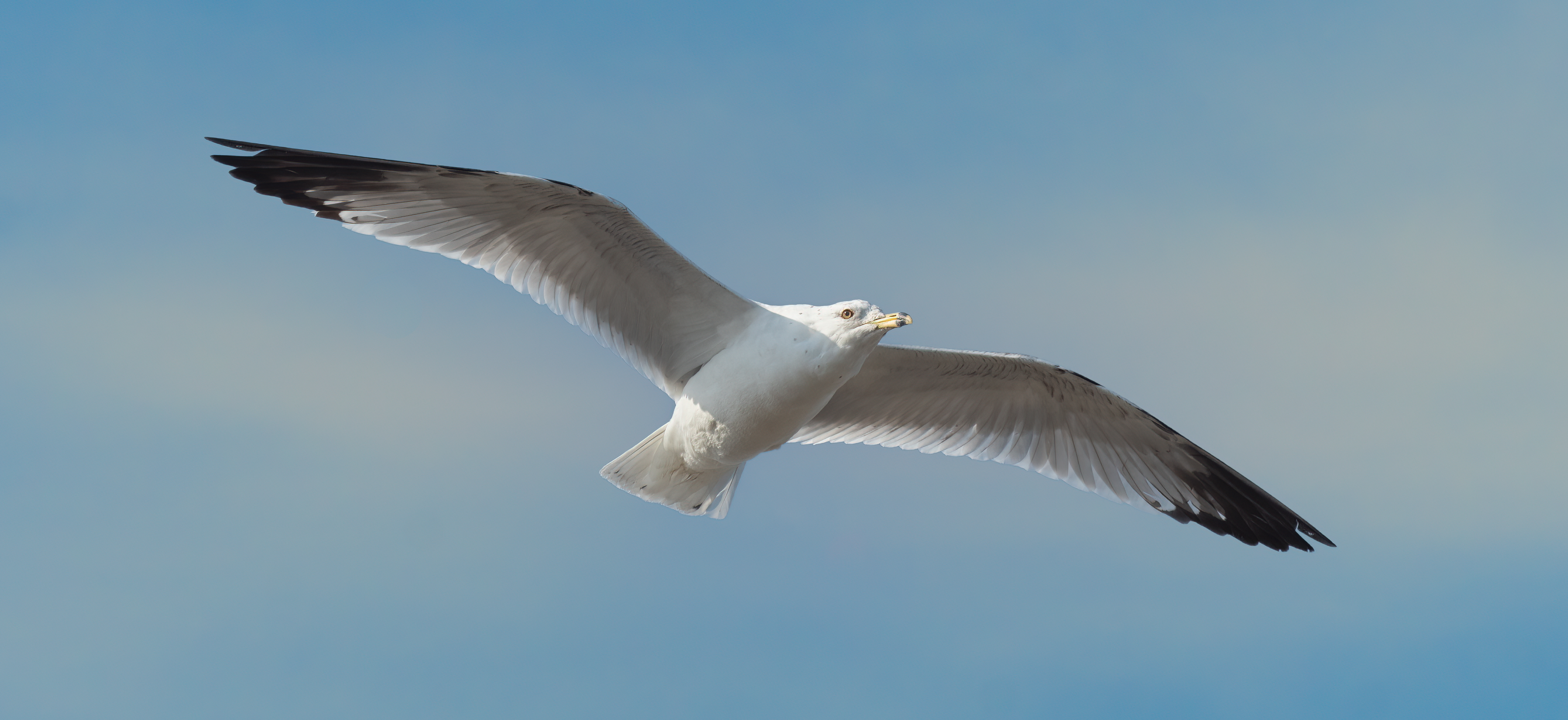
In flight, New York

They are migratory and most move south to the Gulf of Mexico and the Atlantic and Pacific coasts of the United States and northern Mexico; some remain in Canada in winter in the mildest areas, on the Pacific coast in southwest British Columbia, and on the Atlantic coast in Nova Scotia.

=== Vagrancy ===
This gull is a regular wanderer to western Europe. In Ireland and Great Britain it is no longer classed as a rarity, with multiple birds regularly wintering in those countries, though has become rarer again since about 2010. The peak period of occurrence was in the 1990s with on average 77 each year in Great Britain, but this fell to just 16 per year in the 2010s, and only six per year in 2020–2022 (which, at under ten per year, would reclassify it as an official rarity if continued over a decade). This contrasts markedly with Bonaparte's gull, another transatlantic visitor, which has increased in Great Britain from averages of six per year to 12 per year over the same period; the reasons for these contrasting changes are unknown.

== Diet ==
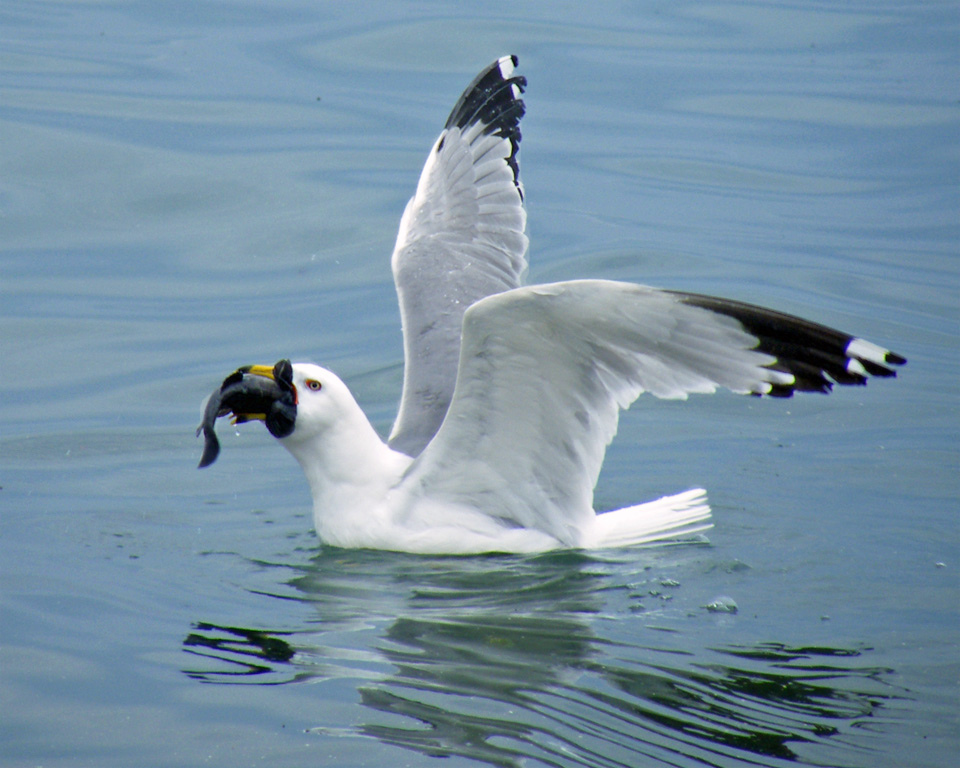
Eating a fish

Ring-billed gulls forage in flight or pick up objects while swimming, walking or wading. They also steal food from other birds and frequently scavenge. They are omnivorous; their diet may include insects, fish, grain, eggs, earthworms and rodents. These birds are opportunistic and have adapted well to taking food when discarded or even left unattended by people. It is regarded as a pest by many beach-goers because of its willingness to steal unguarded food on crowded beaches. The birds congregate at beaches, marinas, docks and parks where people will hand feed them.

The gull's natural predators are rats, foxes, dogs, cats, raccoons, coyotes, eagles, hawks (although they have been seen in pairs chasing hawks), and owls.

== Status ==
In the late 19th century, the ring-billed gull was hunted for its plumage. Its population has since rebounded, and it is the most common gull in eastern North America, reaching a maximum of around 875,000 breeding pairs in this region (1.75 million adults; excluding non-breeding immatures, and western populations) in around 1990, with a slow decline subsequently, due largely to a deliberate policy to reduce their access to feeding on landfill sites. The total population was estimated as 2.55 million birds (including immatures and all populations) in 2006, and still in 2018.
