= Milton Pinto =

- Birth name: Milton de Oliveira Pinto
- Also known as: Milton Pinto
- Origin: Natal, Brazil
- Genres: Pop, Celtic, Christian
- Website: miltonpinto.com

Milton Pinto (Portuguese pronunciation: [miwˈtõ ˈpĩtu]; born in Osasco, São Paulo, is a Brazilian composer, poet, photographer and acoustic guitarist. His music is classic-pop-celtic influenced. In 2010 he released his debut studio album entitled Full of Flowers through a collaboration of four female Irish singers soloists from the popular Gardiner Street Gospel Choir from Dublin, Ireland.

== Discography ==
- 2010 – Full of Flowers

== See also ==
- Celtic Woman
