= Full of Flowers =

Full Of Flowers

Studio album by Milton Pinto
- Released: March 2010
- Recorded: Coolin Studio, Dublin-Ireland, 2009
- Genre: Pop, Celtic, Classical
- Language: English, Irish, Italian

Professional ratings
Review scores
Source	Rating
The Musical Discoveries	4/5 stars

Full of Flowers is an album by the Brazilian composer Milton Pinto. It was released in March, 2010. All lyrics, music and arrangements were composed by Milton Pinto. The album contains four Irish female soloists from the popular Irish choir, the Gardiner Street Gospel Choir, from Dublin, Ireland, who volunteered to record the music. This album features and makes use of vocals influenced from classic to folk and passing through new-age music and Celtic elements, which consists of fifteen numbered tracks categorized by melody as a prime point. The lyrics are sung in English, Italian and Irish. The lyrics are intended to suggest Christian influences rooted into a universal understanding. Recording took place at the Coolin Studio in March 2009, and was managed by the sound engineer Shane Brady.

== Track listing ==
No.	Title	Performer(s)	Length
1.	"Forsaken Light"	Instrumental-Piano	03:10
2.	"Best Of Me"	Susan Hurley	01:50
3.	"Spioraid Naoimh - (in Irish)"	Emer Ní Obhróin	01:47
4.	"Full Of Flowers"	Maria Fenton	02:17
5.	"Pace In Me - (in Italian)"	Anne Hallahan	03:03
6.	"Escape Into Egypt"	Maria Fenton	01:30
7.	"The Unity"	Emer Ní Obhróin & Anne Hallahan	05:52
8.	"Bella La Tua Città - (in Italian)"	Maria Fenton	01:43
9.	"This Green This Harp - (in Irish)" (Lyrics Collaboration from English to Irish by Anne Hallahan)	Anne Hallahan	01:16
10.	"The New Jerusalem"	Anne Hallahan	03:04
11.	"Milagro"	Maria Fenton	02:16
12.	"The Ultimate Song"	Anne Hallahan & Emer Ní Obhróin	03:50
13.	"When Seagulls Find Heaven"	Susan Hurley	03:46
14.	"This Green This Harp"	Instrumental – Piano, Uilleann Pipes and Tin Whistle	01:07
15.	"Word Of Life"	Maria Fenton	01:29

== Personnel ==
=== Band ===
- Susan Hurley
- Maria Fenton
- Emer Ní Obhróin
- Anne Hallahan
- Peter Roycroft – All Pianos and Keyboards
- Mossie Landman – Uilleann Pipes and Tin Whistle on Track 14

== Album art ==
All artwork was conceived by Milton Pinto and produced by the graphic designer Fabricio Cavalcante. The cover art was inspired by the Cliffs of Moher, one of the most popular tourist destinations in Ireland. In July 2009, the cliffs were named one of 28 global finalists in the New Seven Wonders of the World project. The cover art depicts an imaginary landscape with the composer sitting and holding a bouquet of flowers in front of two cliffs, with a Shamrock (a symbol of Ireland) behind him.
