= John Corcoran =

John Corcoran may refer to:

- John Corcoran (Medal of Honor) (1842–1919), American soldier who received the Medal of Honor for valor during the American Civil War
- Jack Corcoran (1858–1935), American catcher in Major League Baseball
- John Corcoran (baseball) (1873–1901), American infielder in Major League Baseball
- John H. Corcoran (1897–1945), Massachusetts politician who served as the mayor of Cambridge, Massachusetts
- John Corcoran (author) (born 1937), American author and spokesman for literacy programs, who set up his own foundation to help people learn to read
- John Corcoran (logician) (1937–2021), American philosopher and logician, University at Buffalo (SUNY)
- John Corcoran (martial arts) (1948–2019), American non-fiction book author, newsstand magazine editor, screenwriter and martial arts historian
- John Corcoran (sports administrator) (1959–2016), Irish Gaelic games administrator
- John Corcoran (dual player) (born 1969), Irish hurler and Gaelic footballer
- John Corcoran (wrongful conviction) (born c. 1971), British man convicted of the murder of Helen Gorrie and then released on appeal in contentious circumstances
- John Corcoran (attorney) (fl. from 1990s), former Clinton White House aide, former speechwriter in the California governor's office, attorney, and blogger

== See also ==
- John Cochrane (disambiguation)
