= Cathalán ua Corcráin =

Cathalán ua Corcráin, Irish Abbot, died 1001.

Cathalán bore a suffix that in his or the next generation became the surname Ó Corcráin, a surname held by two at least two unrelated families. One was a Brehon family from County Fermanagh, a second were situated in Munster. Cathalán probably belonged to the Fermanagh family, as he his obit in the Annals of the Four Masters state he was abb Daimhinsi or Abbot of Devenish Island upon his death.

== See also ==
- Brian Ó Corcrán
- Felimidh Ó Corcrán
- Fláithrí Ó Corcrán
