= Saint Francis Xavier Church, Dublin =

St Francis Xavier Church
- St Francis Xavier Church Dublin
- Eaglais Naoimh Phroinsias Xavier
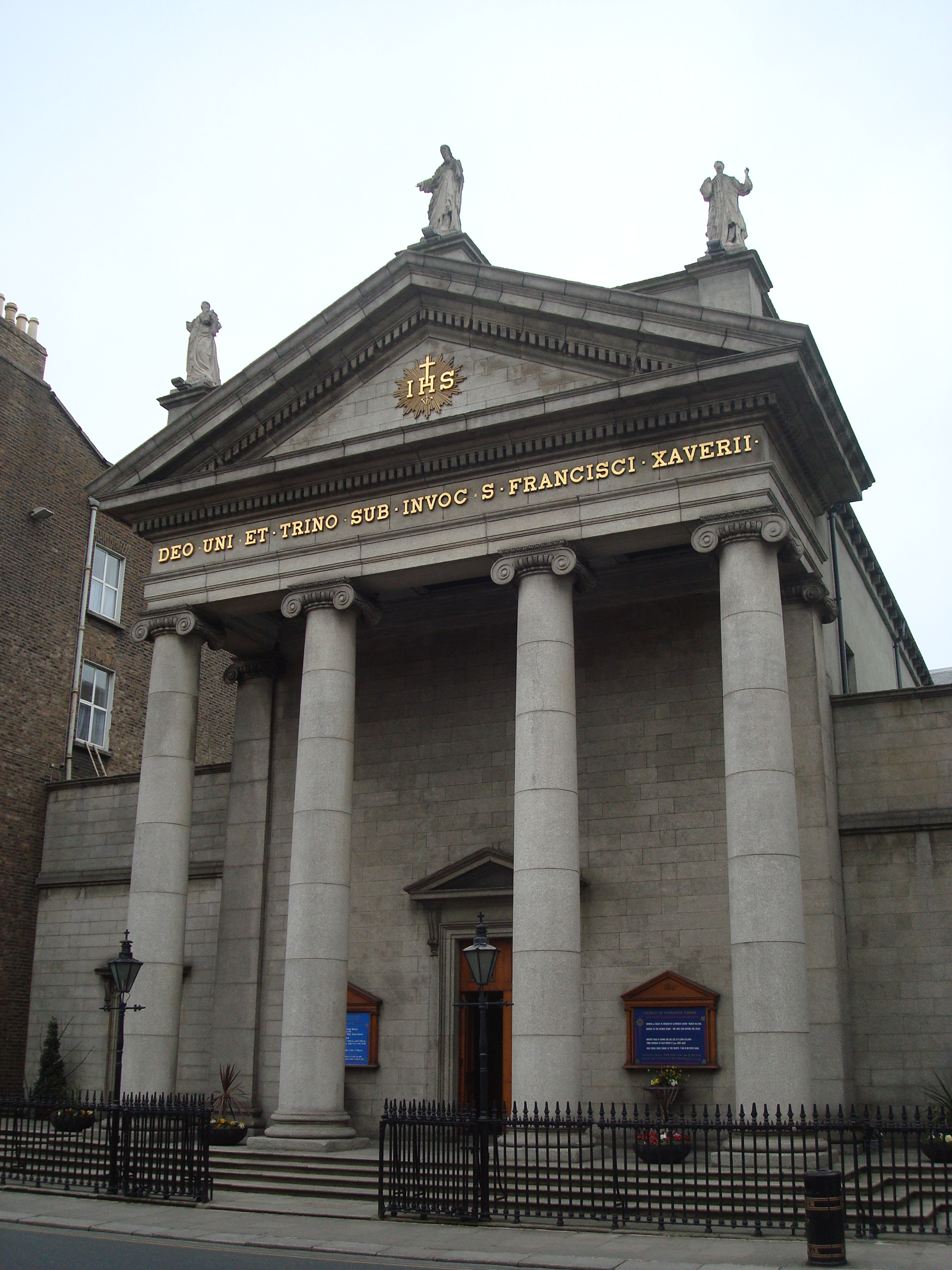

- Location within Central Dublin
- 53.357892°N 6.259949°W
- Location: Upper Gardiner Street, County Dublin
- Country: Ireland
- Denomination: Roman Catholic
- Religious order: Society of Jesus
- Website: gardinerstparish.ie

History
- Founded: 1832
- Dedication: Francis Xavier
- Consecrated: 3 May 1832

Architecture
- Architect(s): Fr Bartholomew Esmonde SJ & Joseph B. Keane
- Architectural type: Church
- Style: Classical
- Groundbreaking: 2 July 1829

Administration
- Archdiocese: Dublin
- Deanery: North City Centre
- Parish: Gardiner Street Parish

Saint Francis Xavier Church, popularly known as Gardiner Street Church, is a Catholic church on Upper Gardiner Street near Mountjoy Square in Dublin, Ireland. The church is run by the Jesuits.

== History ==
Designed by Father Bartholomew Esmonde SJ and erected by the architect Joseph B. Keane as a Classical cut granite stone essay, the first stone was laid on 2 July 1829, the year of Catholic Emancipation. The church was opened on 3 May 1832, though the parish website says "The High Altar ... was designed and assembled in Rome by Fr. B. Esmonde ... who with Mr John B. Keane was the architect of the church". Architectural critic Christine Casey describes it in her book, Dublin, as "the most elegant church of the period in Dublin". The building is known for its collection, sculpted altar piece, and paintings, mostly Italian in origin and dating from the Victorian period. The design of St Francis Xavier Church reflects Father B. Esmonde's knowledge of the temples of Italy acquired during his residency there.

In 1889 the funeral was held here for the poet Gerard Manley Hopkins.

The church features in James Joyce's short story "Grace" from Dubliners and in the 1991 film The Commitments where the church organ is used to play A Whiter Shade of Pale.

The Latin text on the pediment reads, DEO UNI ET TRINO SUB INVOC S FRANCISCI XAVERII which translates in English as, "to God one and Three under the invocation of St Francis Xavier".

The remains of the Blessed John Sullivan are enshrined in the church.

== Gallery ==
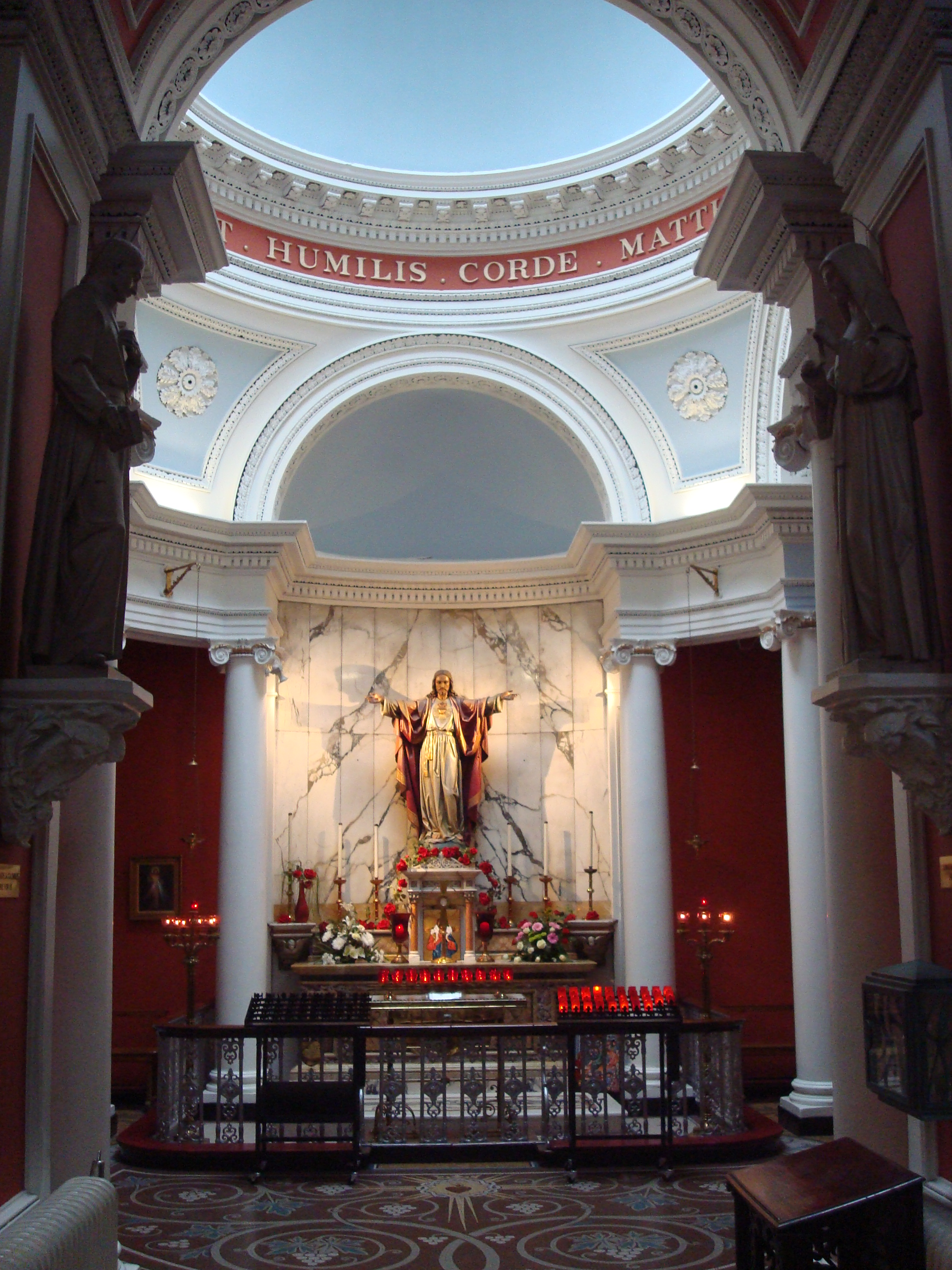
Left Transept

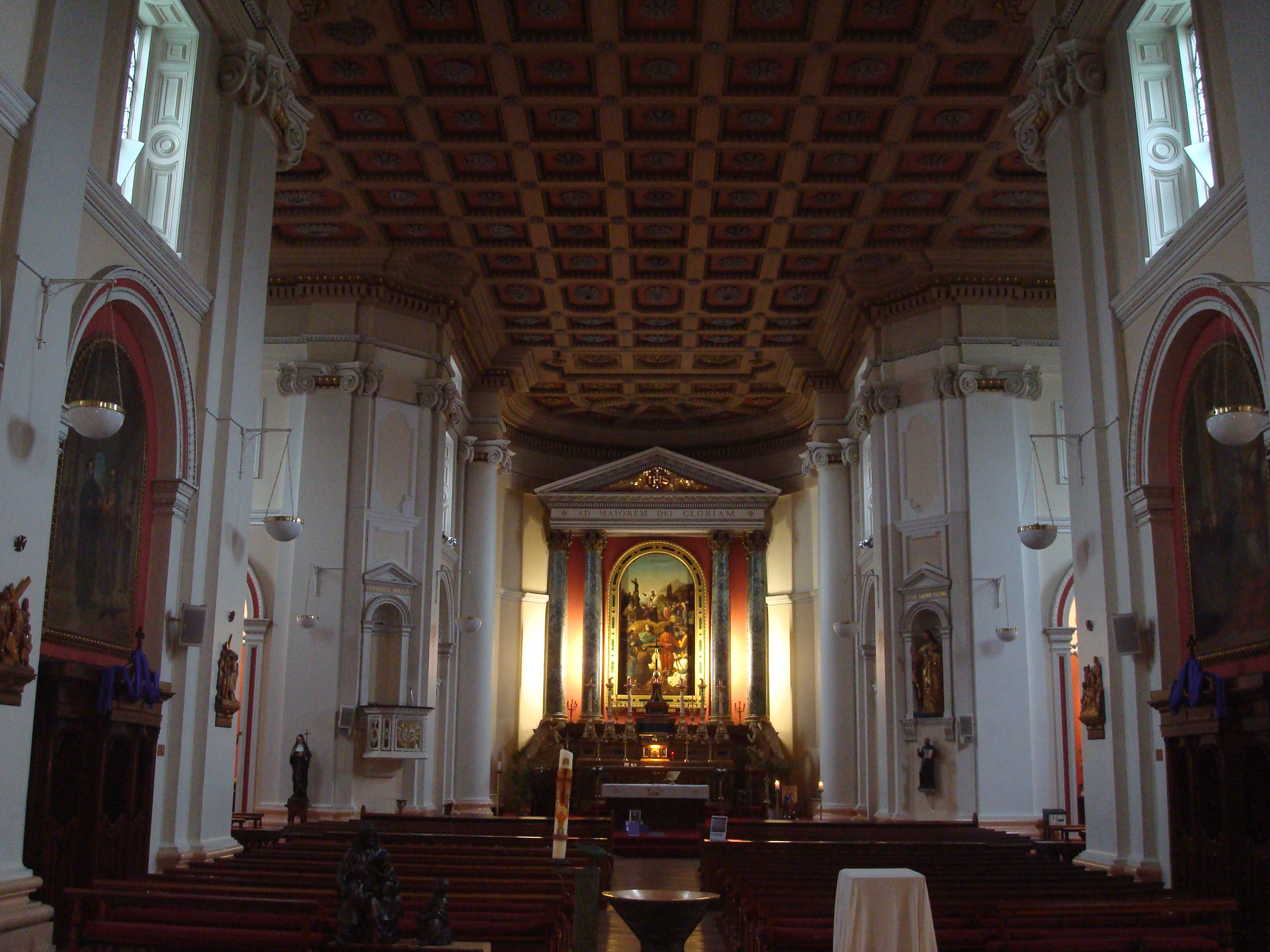
Main Church

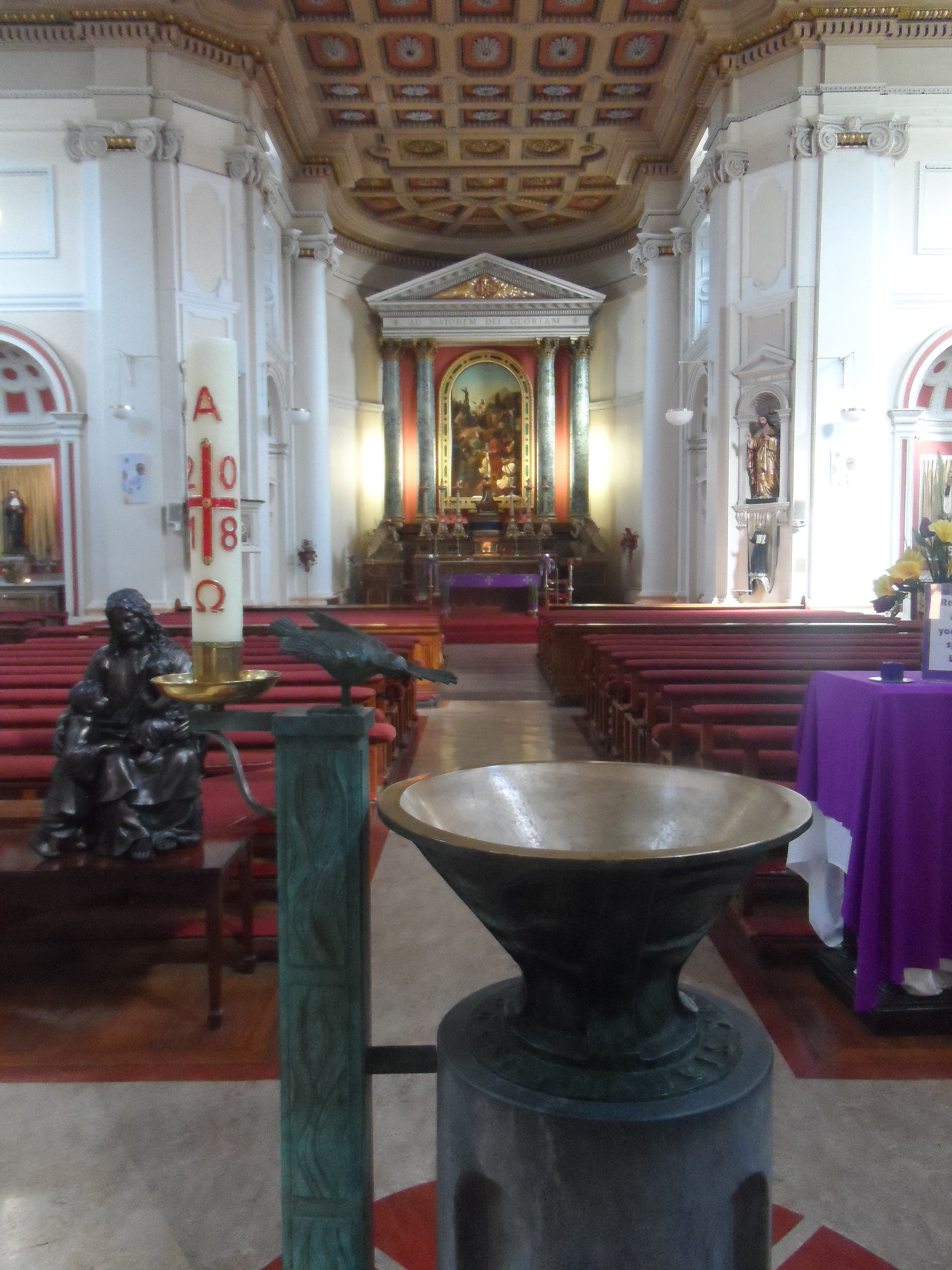
View of altar

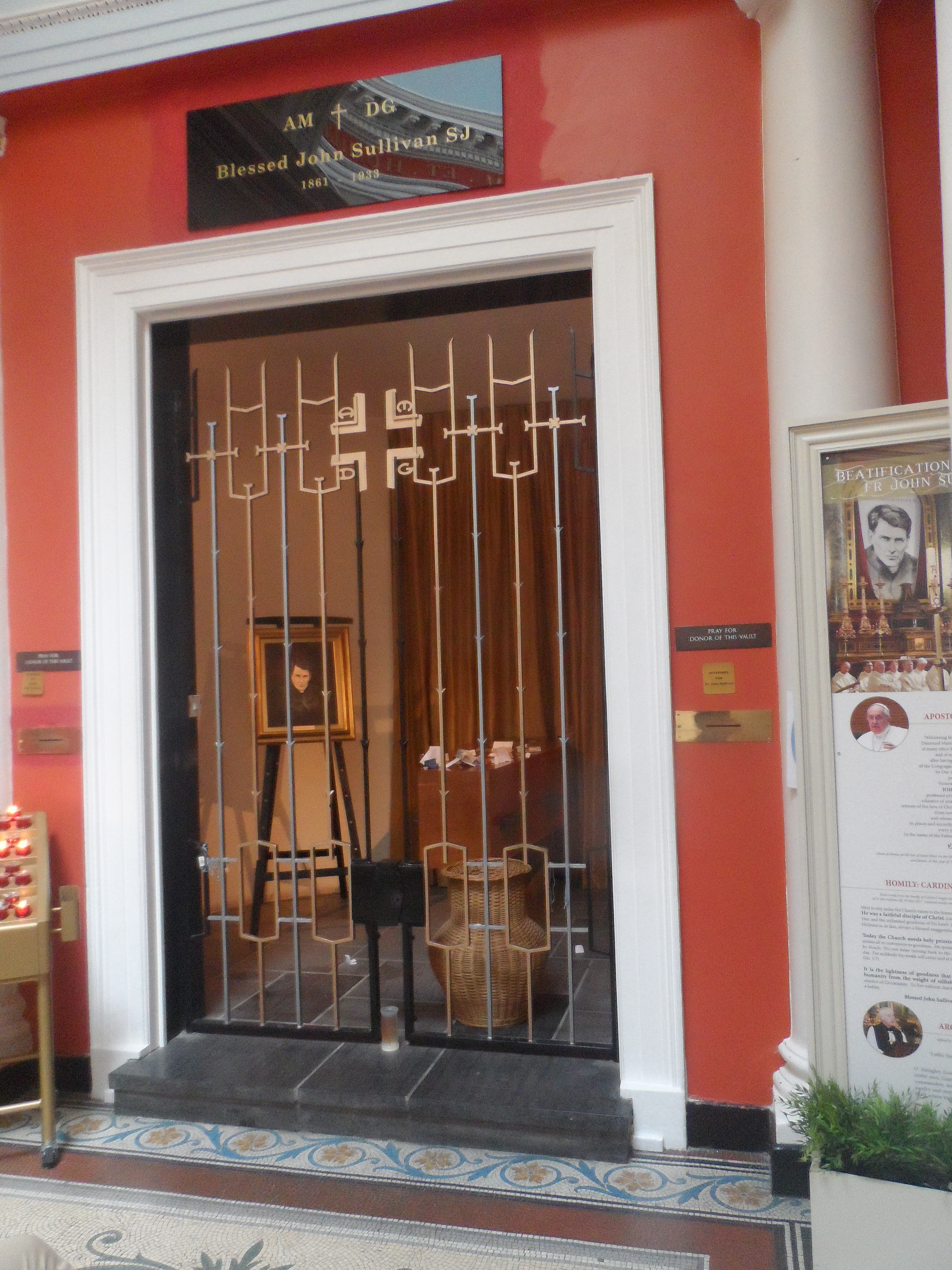
Sullivan tomb

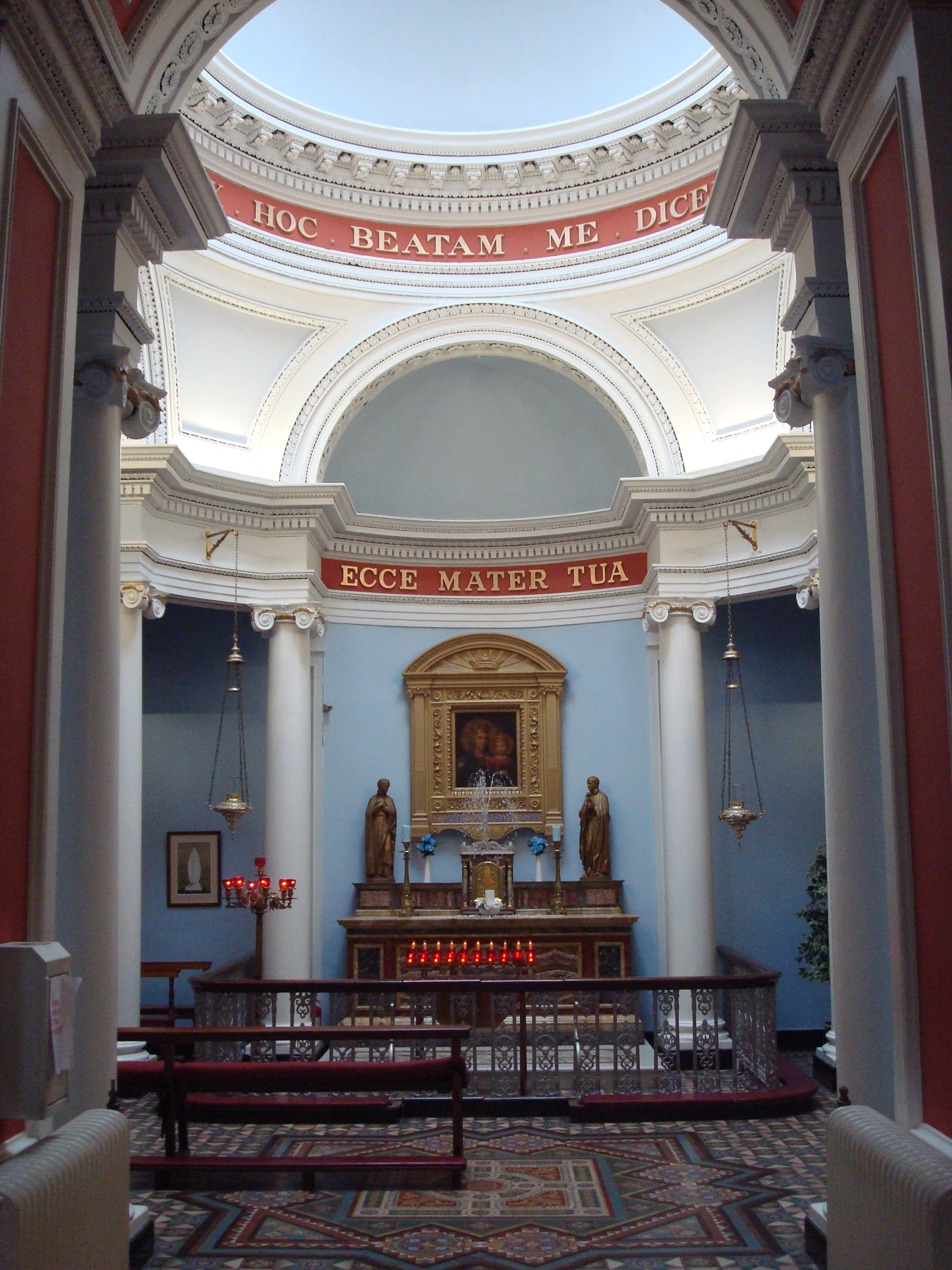
Right Transept

== See also ==
- Gardiner Street Gospel Choir
- List of Jesuit sites in Ireland
- List of Catholic churches in Ireland
