= James Corcoran (disambiguation) =

James Corcoran (c. 1770–1804) was an Irish rebel.

James Corcoran may also refer to:

- James Corcoran (sound engineer), American sound engineer
- James A. Corcoran (Brooklyn) (c. 1880–1949), New York politician
- James Andrew Corcoran (1820–1889), American Catholic publisher and theologian
- Jim Corcoran (born 1949), Canadian musician
- Jim Corcoran (politician) (1885–1965), Australian politician
- Jimmy Corcoran (1820–1900), Irish-American gangster
- Jimmy Corcoran (footballer) (born 2002), Irish footballer
- King Corcoran (James Sean Patrick Corcoran, 1943–2009), American football player
