= Timothy Corcoran =

Timothy or Tim Corcoran may refer to:

- Timothy Corcoran (cultural historian) (1871–1943), Irish Jesuit scholar
- Tim Corcoran (first baseman) (born 1953), American baseball first baseman/outfielder
- Timothy R. Corcoran, American legislator in the Vermont House of Representatives
- Timothy Corcoran II, his son, also a member of the Vermont House of Representatives
- Tim Corcoran (pitcher) (born 1978), American baseball pitcher

== See also ==
- Corcoran (surname)
