= Brian Ó Corcrán =

Irish poet (d. c. 1624)

Brian Ó Corcrán, Irish poet, d. c. 1624 Ó Corcrán's floruit is uncertain. (An earlier Brian Ó Corcrán (d. 1487) is listed as a vicar.) The surname is now rendered as Corcoran (surname).

Ó Corcrán authored two surviving poems, Mo chion dot bhronnadh, a Bhriain and Rí con Éireann Ábhartach

The first verse of Mo chion dot bhronnadh, a Bhriain is the following:

Mo chion dot bhronnadh, a Bhriain,
a mhic na flatha a finnChliaigh,
a aistrigh an toirbheirt truim,
h'aisgidh badh oirdheirc aguinn.

Rí con Éireann Ábhartach, a poem on Irish kings, begins:

Rí con Éireann Ábhartach
coiléan ciuin cruadhbhánaltach;
is tuar clú a hoirbhearta áigh
cú bhus oirrdhearca n-iomráidh.

== See also ==
- Felimidh Ó Corcrán
- Cahalan Ó Corcrán
- Fláithrí Ó Corcrán
