= Sandy Point Farmhouse =

Historic house in Maryland, United States

- U.S. National Register of Historic Places
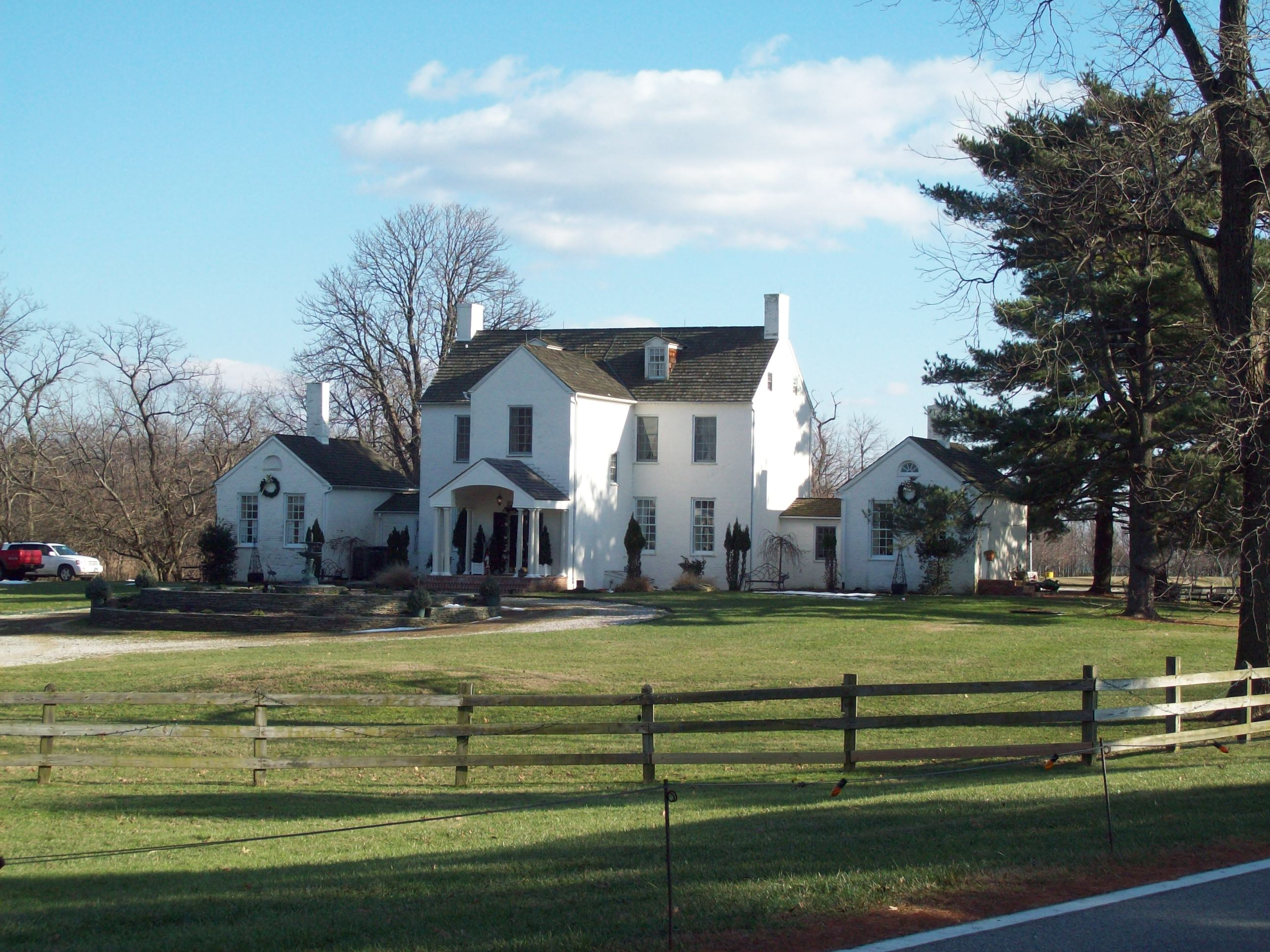
- Sandy Point Farmhouse, December 2009

- Location within Maryland Location within the United States
- Location: Sandy Point State Park, Skidmore, Maryland
- Coordinates: 39°0′52″N 76°23′58″W
- Area: 17.6 acres (7.1 ha)
- NRHP reference No.: 72000566
- Added to NRHP: February 11, 1972

The Sandy Point Farmhouse is a historic home at Sandy Point State Park, Anne Arundel County, Maryland, United States. It is a five-part plan consisting of a two-story central block connected to two wings by single-story hyphens. It was built in an 18th-century style in the 19th century and typical of Maryland domestic architecture. The house was constructed about 1815 for John Gibson, a member of the Annapolis elite whose wife Anne Ogle Ridout was granddaughter of Samuel Ogle, an 18th-century Governor of Maryland.

The Sandy Point Farmhouse was listed on the National Register of Historic Places in 1972.

== Gallery ==
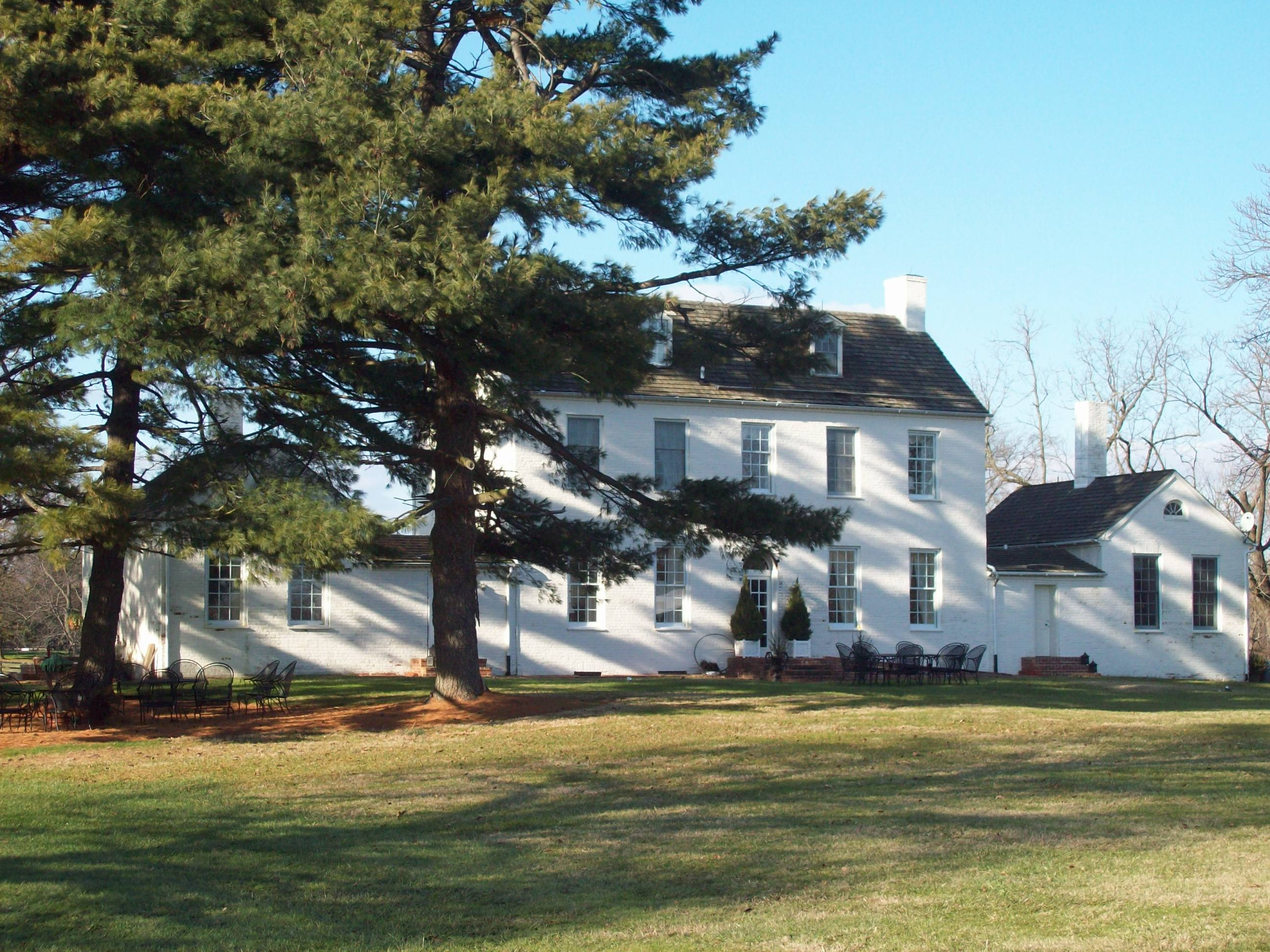
Sandy Point Farmhouse, Rear View, December 2009
