= Corkran =

Corkran is a surname. Notable people with the surname include:

- Alice Corkran (1843–1916), Irish author of children's fiction and editor of children's magazines
- Charles Corkran (1872–1939), British Army general
- Peter Corkran (born 1948), Australian rules footballer

== See also ==
- Corcoran (surname)
