= Gardiner Street =

Street in Dublin, Ireland

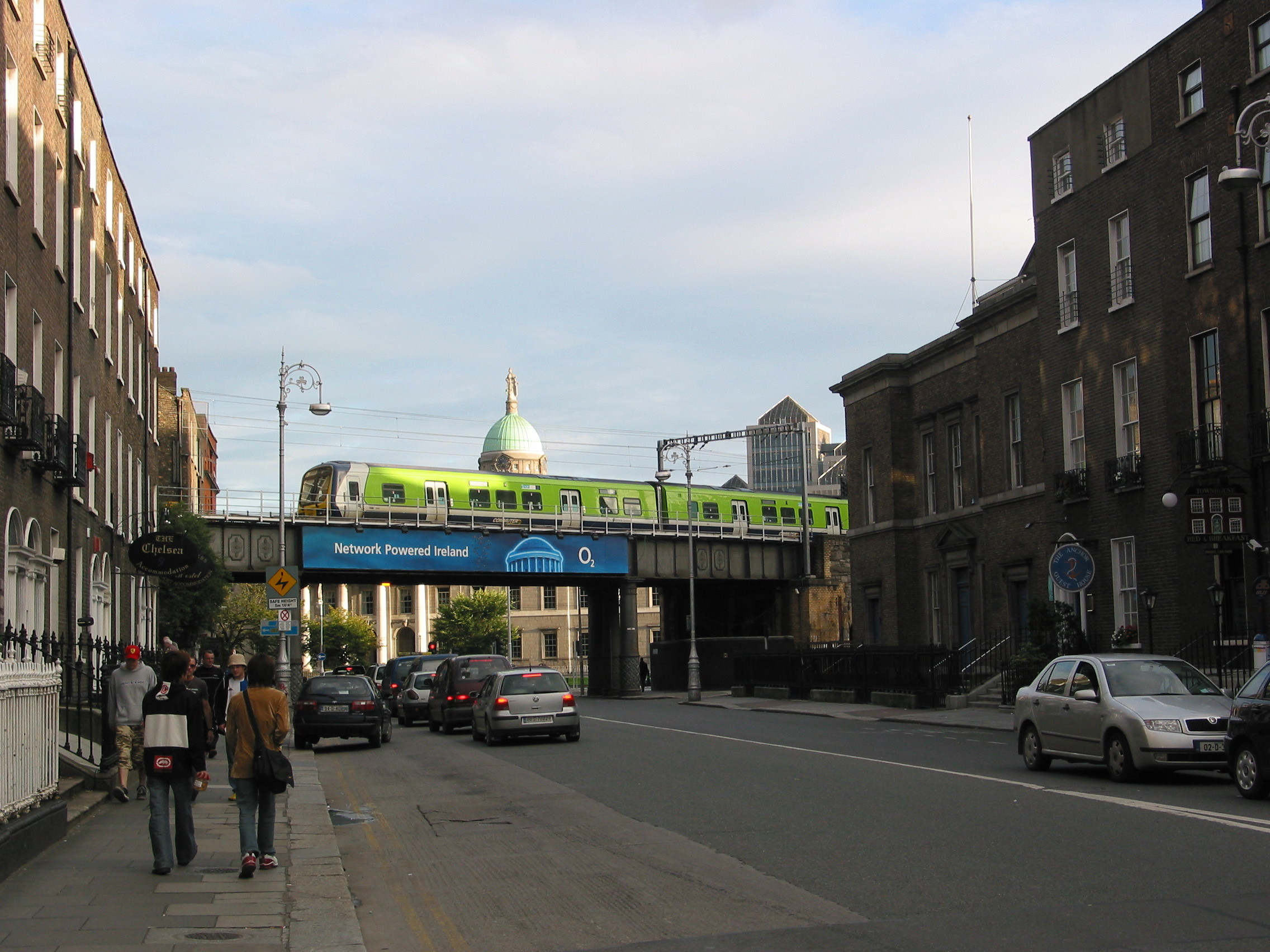
- Elevated railway bridge crossing Gardiner Street

- Location within Central Dublin
- Native name: Sráid Ghairdinéir (Irish); Sráid Gardnar (Irish)
- Namesake: Luke Gardiner, 1st Viscount Mountjoy
- Length: 1.2 km (0.75 mi)
- Width: 22 metres (72 ft)
- Location: Dublin, Ireland
- Postal code: D01
- Coordinates: 53.355217°N 6.257586°W
- south end: Beresford Place
- north end: Dorset Street Lower

Other
- Known for: Georgian architecture, Saint Francis Xavier Church, Trinity Church, hotels

Gardiner Street (Irish: Sráid Ghairdinéir) is a long Georgian street in Dublin, Ireland. It stretches from the River Liffey at its southern end via Mountjoy Square to Dorset Street at its northern end. The Custom House terminates the vista at the southern end, and the street is divided into Gardiner Street Upper (north end), Gardiner Street Middle and Gardiner Street Lower (south end).

== History ==
The thoroughfare is called Old Rope Walk on John Rocque's 1756 Dublin map. The current street was laid out around 1787 by Luke Gardiner, 1st Viscount Mountjoy the son of Charles Gardiner and grandson of Luke Gardiner. It was developed as a series of sloping terraces, leading from Beresford Place to Mountjoy Square, and was intended to be Dublin's largest, widest, longest and grandest street. However, owing to the Acts of Union in 1801, the economic depression that Dublin experienced and the associated drastic fall in demand for city townhouses, the street was never fully completed to its intended grandeur and scale. Many of the original buildings were converted into tenements, which were later demolished.

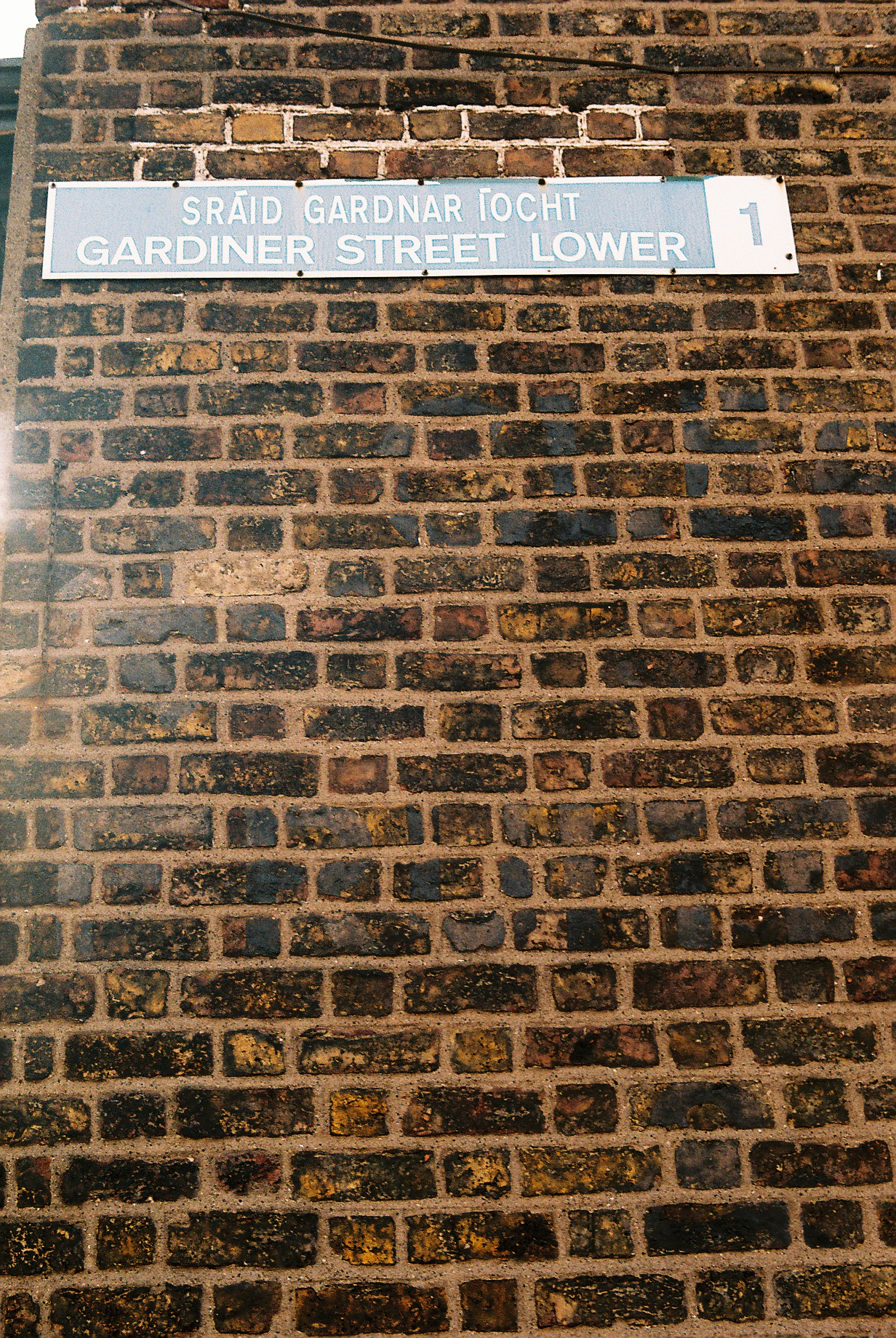
Lower Gardiner Street sign

Lower Gardiner Street South leads from Mountjoy Square to the Georgian Custom House overlooking the River Liffey. Several hostels are on this part of the street as well as Trinity Church. The DART line crosses near the intersection with Beresford Place behind the Custom House; this end is only a few minutes' walk from Connolly station, and around the corner from Lower Gardiner Street is the Luas red line stop at Busáras. There is heavy road traffic on Lower Gardiner Street as it is also part of Dublin City Council's Inner Orbital Route with traffic creating a bottleneck as it comes down Gardiner Street as well as filtering in from Talbot Street at this point.

Middle and Upper Gardiner Street are separated from the lower street by the west side of Mountjoy Square. On Upper Gardiner Street is located Saint Francis Xavier Church, a stone Classical building dating from 1829 and with a connection to the poet Gerard Manley Hopkins, Blessed John Sullivan SJ, is interred in the church. Gardiner Street has another notable poetic connection by way of featuring in Patrick Kavanagh's poem "Memory of My Father".

The core part of the street was commenced in 1792 and finished around 1820. Gardiner's grand vision was to see a crescent built where the Mater Hospital now stands while the other end would culminate with a view of the Custom House.

Georgian terraces still remain largely intact at the lower end of Lower Gardiner Street approaching the Custom House, at Mountjoy Square and in surrounding streets however large tracts of the street between Mountjoy Square and Railway Street were controversially demolished in the 1970s and 1980s to make way for social housing and an IDA campus on the corner of Summerhill. A new park called Diamond Park was also built near where the street meets Seán McDermott Street. In the 2010s the IDA campus was replaced with student accommodation.

== Historic former residents ==
Playwright, producer and actor Dion Boucicault (1820–1890) lived at number 47 Lower Gardiner Street. Boucicault was involved with over 150 plays, and is best known for The Shaughraun, other works include: “Napoleon’s Old Guard”, “A Legend of the Devil’s Dyke”, “London Assurance”, and “The Colleen Bawn”. His mother was a relative of the first Arthur Guinness. Both Seán O'Casey (see also Mountjoy Square) and John Millington Synge acknowledged him as being a major influence on their dramatic works.

Frances Corcoran, better known as Michael Corcoran (nun), an Irish nun, pioneer of female education in Ireland, and the longest serving Superior General of the Loreto Order was born on Gardiner Street on 5 July 1846.

Number 41 Gardiner Street Upper was home of Joe McGuinness, elected as a Sinn Féin TD for Longford South to the first Dáil in 1918 while in Lewes Gaol, under the slogan of “Vote him in to get him out”. During the Easter Rising in 1916, McGuinness was also involved in commandeering the Four Courts for the volunteers.

== See also ==
- List of streets and squares in Dublin
- Lafcadio Hearn
