= Fláithrí Ó Corcrán =

Irish singer and harpist

Fláithrí Ó Corcrán, Irish singer and harpist, d. 1496.

Ó Corcrán bore a surname held by at least two unrelated clans; one was a Brehon family from County Fermanagh, a second was situated in Munster. It is uncertain to which, if either, family Fláithrí belonged.

The Annals of the Four Masters record his death, sub anno 1496:

- Florence O'Corcoran, player on the harp and other stringed instruments, and a distinguished vocalist died.

== See also ==
- Brian Ó Corcrán
- Felimidh Ó Corcrán
- Cahalan Ó Corcrán
