= Michael Corcoran (disambiguation) =

Michael Corcoran (1827–1863) was an Irish-born American general in the Union Army during the American Civil War.

Michael Corcoran or Mike Corcoran may also refer to:

- Michael Corcoran (bishop) (died 1819), Roman Catholic Bishop in Kildare and Leighlin
- Michael Corcoran (nun) (1846–1927), Irish nun and Superior General of the Loreto Order
- Michael Corcoran (Medal of Honor) (1847–1919), United States Army corporal
- Mike Corcoran (baseball) (1858–1927), Major League Baseball pitcher
- Michael George Corcoran (born 1963), American politician in the Missouri House of Representatives
- Mike Corcoran (canoeist) (born 1965), Irish slalom canoeist
- Michael Corcoran (lobbyist) (born 1967), American lobbyist based in Florida
- Michael Corcoran (musician) (born 1972), American musician
- Michael Corcoran (journalist) (born 1956), American music journalist and author
