= John Corcoran (attorney) =

American attorney and podcaster

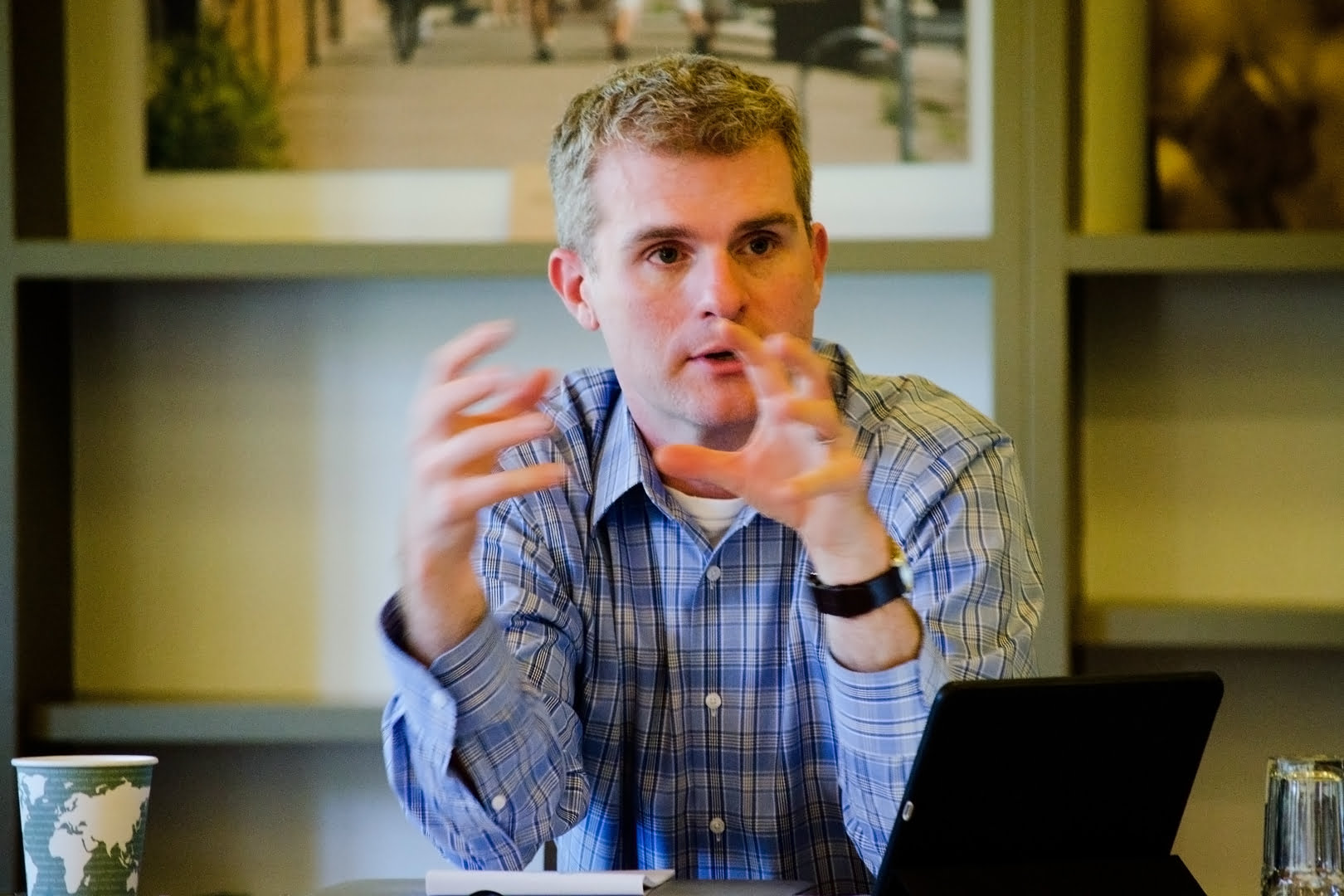
- John Corcoran
- Born: Washington, D.C.
- Occupations: Podcaster, attorney, small business advisor
- Known for: White House aide, speechwriter
- Website: www.smartbusinessrevolution.com

John Corcoran is a former writer in the White House Office of Presidential Letters and Messages during the Clinton Administration and speechwriter in the California Governor's Office during the Davis Administration.

He is a long-time podcaster and the cofounder of Rise25, and a B2B focused podcast agency which focuses on helping B2B companies to start and run podcasts.

Corcoran started his podcast in 2010 and has recorded over 1,500 podcast episodes as of 2025.

Before co-founding Rise25, Corcoran was an attorney and founder of the Corcoran Law Firm located in San Rafael, California and the founder of Smart Business Revolution, which provides advice aimed at entrepreneurs and small business owners.

While in the Governor's Office, he was involved in the creation of the campaign Flex Your Power, California's statewide energy efficiency marketing and outreach campaign which was created during the California energy crisis. He went on to do consulting work for the County of Marin during the formation of the first successful community choice power program in the State of California.

Corcoran has written for Forbes, Entrepreneur, Inc. and the Art of Manliness.

Corcoran is the author of numerous opinion articles in the San Francisco Chronicle, San Francisco Business Times and other publications, including "Feds Should Reject California's loan modification rule", "NFL Stadium bills cut to the front of the line", and "Car Startups Need to Rev Up for Revolution". He is frequently quoted in news publications on legal matters.

He was chair of the Town of Tiburon Planning Commission in 2012.

After graduating from the University of San Francisco School of Law, Corcoran was admitted to the California State Bar in 2007. As an attorney, Corcoran specialized in representing small business owners and entrepreneurs as well as practicing real estate and land use law. He was recognized as a Super Lawyer Rising Star for Northern California and received a "Superb" rating by attorney-rating website Avvo.com.

He has 3 sons and a daughter and lives in Marin County, California.
