= List of programs broadcast by GMA Pinoy TV =

This page contains the list of programs broadcast by GMA Pinoy TV, whose earning grew by 43 per cent to P1.5 billion in 2004 from P1.055 in 2023. As of February, the TV also increased its ratings lead with a day rating of 19.5 per cent. It was earlier 13.5 per cent according to AGB Philippines, a research wing.

== Pinoy Balitaan ==
=== News programs ===
- 24 Oras [2004 – present (GMA Network), 2005 – present (GMA Pinoy TV)] > •[with Tagalog Closed Captions on certain providers]
  - 24 Oras Weekend [(2010 – present)] •[with Tagalog Closed Captions on certain providers]
- GMA Flash Report [2002 – present (GMA Network), 2006 – present (GMA Pinoy TV)]
- Saksi [1995 – present (GMA Network), 2005 – present (GMA Pinoy TV)] •[with Tagalog Closed Captions on certain providers]
- Unang Hirit [1999 – present (GMA Network), 2005 – present (GMA Pinoy TV)]

== Pinoy Infotainment ==
=== Infotainment ===
- MP Featuring Sports Science (aired twice a month; 2014–present); one-episode delay

=== Lifestyle ===
- Kapuso Mo, Jessica Soho [2004 – present (GMA Network), 2005 – present (GMA Pinoy TV)]

=== Public affairs ===
- Alisto! (April 7, 2013 – present); three-episodes delay
- Born to be Wild (2007 – present)
- I-Witness [1999 – present (GMA Network), 2005–present (GMA Pinoy TV)] (first produced by Probe Productions and later by GMA News and Public Affairs) •[with onscreen English subtitles]
- Imbestigador [2000 – present (GMA Network), 2005 – present (GMA Pinoy TV)]
- Reporter's Notebook [2004 – present (GMA Network), 2005 – present (GMA Pinoy TV)]
- Tunay Na Buhay [2011 – November 13, 2013 (as Weekend show); November 20, 2013 – present(as Daily show; two-episodes delay)
- Wish Ko Lang 2002 – present (GMA Network), 2005 – present (GMA Pinoy TV); one-episode delay •[with onscreen English subtitles]

== Pinoy Telenovelas ==
=== Drama ===
- Healing Hearts [premieres May 12, 2015 (all feeds)]; one-episode delay
- InstaDad [April 5, 2015 – present (all feeds)]; same-day airing
- Kailan Ba Tama ang Mali? [February 10, 2015 - May 11, 2015 (all feeds)]; one-episode delay
- Let the Love Begin [premieres May 4, 2015 (North America); premieres May 5, 2015 (Middle East and North Africa, Asia Pacific and Europe)]; same-day airing
- Once Upon a Kiss [January 5, 2015 - May 1, 2015 (North America); January 6, 2015 - May 4, 2015 (Middle East and North Africa, Asia Pacific and Europe)]; same-day airing
- Pari 'Koy [March 9, 2015 – present (all feeds)]; same-day airing
- The Rich Man's Daughter [premieres May 11, 2015 (North America); premieres May 12, 2015 (Middle East and North Africa, Asia Pacific and Europe)]; same-day airing
- The Half Sisters [June 10, 2014 – present (all feeds)]; one-episode delay
- Second Chances [January 12, 2015 - May 8, 2015 (North America); January 13, 2015 - May 11, 2015 (Middle East and North Africa, Asia Pacific and Europe)]; same-day airing
- Yagit [October 14, 2014 – present (all feeds)]; one-episode delay

== Pinoy Funtambayan ==
=== Comedy ===
- Bubble Gang [1995 – present (GMA Network), 2005 – present (GMA Pinoy TV)]
- Ismol Family (June 28, 2014 – present)
- Pepito Manaloto: Ang Tunay na Kuwento (September 22, 2012 – present); one-episode delay •[with onscreen English subtitles]
- Vampire Ang Daddy Ko (March 16, 2013 – present)

=== Cooking show ===
- Idol sa Kusina (July 3, 2011 – present (GMA News TV), 2011 – July 2012 (GMA Life TV), July 14, 2012 – present (GMA Pinoy TV); reruns

=== Game show ===
- Celebrity Bluff (November 24, 2012 – present); one-episode delay

== Pinoy Astig Anthology ==
=== Tagalog-dubbed Cartoons ===
- Angry Birds Toons [2013–present, 2015–present]
- Cross Fight B-Daman [2011 (TV Tokyo), 2015 - present]
- Doraemon [1979 (TV Asahi), 1999 (GMA Network), 2015–present]
- Dragon Ball Fight! Presents (2015 – present)
- Fairy Tail [2009 (TV Tokyo), 2015 - present]
- The Flying House [1982 (TV Tokyo), 1992 (GMA Network), 2015–present]
- Knock Out [produced by Kodansha and Madhouse; 2015–present]
- Magi: The Kingdom of Magic [produced by Shogakukan and A-1 Pictures; 2012 (MBS), 2015–present]
- Magic Kaito [2010 (NNS), 2015–present]
- Martin Mystery [2003 (M6), 2015–present]
- Pac-Man and the Ghostly Adventures [2013, 2015–present]
- The Smurfs [1981 (NBC), 2015–present]
- Time Quest [produced by Ashi Productions and Tatsunoko Production; 1989 (Fuji TV), 2015–present]

=== Tagalog-dubbed Koreanovela ===
- Full House [2004 (KBS2), 2005 (GMA Network), December 23, 2013 - March 12, 2014 (GMA Life TV); April 22, 2014 - June 17, 2014; 2015 - present] special run

== Pinoy Weekend Treats ==
=== Drama Anthology ===
- Magpakailanman 2002–2008; November 17, 2012 – present (GMA Network); 2005–2008 (GMA Pinoy TV); 2008–2011 (GMA Life TV); November 17, 2012 – present); new episodes with one-episode delay •[with onscreen English subtitles]
- Wagas [2013–present (GMA News TV), March 18, 2013 – present (GMA Pinoy TV)]; reruns

=== Lifestyle International ===
- KMG: Kaya Mong Gawin: Season 7 – Hosted by Jojo and Maricel Quiroz (October 2013 – present); one-episode delay*
- Pusong Pinoy Sa Amerika: Season 10 – Hosted by Atty. Lou Tancinco and Eric Quizon (April 2014 – present); new episodes
- The Dr. Tess Show: Season 3 – Hosted by Dr. Tess Mauricio (May 5, 2013 – present); re-runs

=== Spanish-dubbed U.S. TV series (Sí! MeTV Presents) ===
- Buck Rogers in the 25th Century [1979 (NBC), 2015–present]
- Hercules: The Legendary Journeys [1995, 2015–present]
- The Honeymooners [1955 (CBS), 2015–present]
- I Love Lucy [1951 (CBS), 2015–present]
- The Incredible Hulk [1977 (CBS), 2015–present]
- Knight Rider [1982 (NBC), 2015–present]
- Miami Vice [1984 (NBC), 2015–present]
- Quantum Leap [1989 (NBC), 2015–present]
- Xena: Warrior Princess [1995, 2015–present]

=== Movie Block ===
- GMA Pinoy Blockbuster (2006 – present)
- Pinoy Indie on GMA Pinoy TV (2009 – present); recurring

=== Showbiz-oriented talk show ===
- Startalk 1995–present (GMA Network), 2005 – present (GMA Pinoy TV)

== Pinoy Entertainment Overload ==
=== Variety ===
- Sunday All Stars (June 16, 2013 – present)
- Walang Tulugan with the Master Showman [1997 – present (GMA Network), 2005 – present (GMA Pinoy TV)]

== Religious ==
- The 700 Club Asia [2011–present (GMA News TV); 2011–2013 (GMA Life TV), 2013 – present (GMA Pinoy TV)]
- Family TV Mass [produced by MCFI-SVD; 2014 (GMA Network), May 1, 2011 – present (GMA Pinoy TV)]
- Jesus the Healer 1998–2001, 2006 – present (GMA Network), 2006 – present (GMA Pinoy TV)
