= Felimidh Ó Corcrán =

16th century Irish Doctor of Canon Law

Felimidh Ó Corcrán (died 1522) was an Irish Doctor of Canon Law.

Ó Corcrán was a member of a Brehon family from County Fermanagh. The Annals of the Four Masters record his death, sub anno 1522:

- Master Felim O'Corcran, a learned doctor of the canon law, died.

== See also ==
- Brian Ó Corcrán
- Fláithrí Ó Corcrán
- Cahalan Ó Corcrán
