= Farrel Corcoran =

Professor Farrel Corcoran is an author and retired academic of Dublin City University. He has served as Head of Communication and Dean of the Faculty of Humanities at the university. From 1995 to 2000 he was chairman of RTÉ, the Republic of Ireland's public service broadcaster.

Farrel Corcoran was born in Borrisokane, he went to secondary school in St Finian's College, Mullingar, before entered Maynooth College as a clerical student, following his Humanities studies he left the seminary and became a teacher, in Ireland and abroad. He also worked at RTE. Corcoran went to the US to do postgraduate studies, earning a PhD from University of Oregon.

== Published works ==
Books by Farrel Corcoran include: RTÉ and the Globalisation of Irish Television, Intellect Books, 2004.
