= Michael Corcoran (nun) =

Superior General of the Loreto Order (1846–1927)

M. Michael Corcoran

Personal life
- Born: Frances Corcoran; 5 July 1846 Gardiner Street
- Died: 27 May 1927 (aged 80)

Religious life
- Religion: Roman Catholic
- Order: Sisters of Loreto

Mother Michael Corcoran (born Frances Corcoran, 5 July 1846- 27 May 1927) was an Irish nun and the longest serving Superior General of the Loreto Order. She is recognised as a pioneer of female education in Ireland.

== Early life ==
Frances Corcoran was born to Michael Corcoran and Anna Maria Magan on Gardiner Street, Dublin, on 5 July 1846. She was a boarding student at Loreto College, North Great George's Street (now Loreto College, Swords).

== In the Loreto Order ==
In 1865, Corcoran entered the Loreto Abbey Rathfarnham and took her father's name, Michael, as a religious name. She made her final profession in 1867. In 1875, Corcoran was elected the Mother Superior of the Rathfarnham convent. From either 1875 or 1878, Corcoran held the position of novice-mistress a position which she held until her promotion to Superior General. This happened in 1888, when at the age of forty-two Corcoran was elected the Superior General of the Loreto Order, a position to which she was re-elected five times, and that she held for 32 years, making her the longest serving Superior General in the order's history. An educational pioneer, Corcoran believed that girls should be provided an equivalent education to what boys were receiving at the time. She founded Loreto College, St Stephen's Green, which she hoped would be made into the nation's first women's university, but without the support of Archbishop William Walsh, it never became such. Corcoran died in the abbey on 27 May 1927.
