= Gardiner Street Gospel Choir =

- Origin: Dublin, Ireland
- Genres: Gospel
- Years active: 2000–present
- Website: gsgc.info

The Gardiner Street Gospel Choir is a Gospel music choir based in the Jesuit Saint Francis Xavier Church on Gardiner Street in Dublin, Ireland. The choir is made up of volunteers who perform at services and on other stages around Ireland. The choir has won a number of awards, including the gospel choir competition at the AIMS choral festival in New Ross.

== History ==
The choir was founded in 2000 by Trinity College music graduate Kevin Kelly and Edmond Grace SJ. Beginning with a smaller group, as of 2011, there were 40 voices backed by 8 musicians. As of 2020, the musical director was Cathy McEvoy.

Over the years, the group have played in a number of venues, including the National Concert Hall and the Olympia Theatre.

In May 2008, the choir performed at Irish Aid's 'Africa Day' in Dublin Castle, where they collaborated with Kíla.

== Recordings ==
The choir is accompanied by some instruments, including keyboard, guitar, percussion and brass. The music played includes gospel and contemporary, including pieces by U2 and Bob Marley as well as traditional gospel.

In 2002, Gardiner Street Gospel Choir made radio and television appearances and launched a CD named One Love. This CD was recorded live at a concert in the O'Reilly Hall, at Belvedere College, Dublin.

In 2003, Luka Bloom performed with the choir, and the choir provided backing vocals for two tracks on his Eleven Songs album. They were recorded in the Ignatian Room, at the back of Gardiner Street Church.

The choir recorded with Juliet Turner, and were heard on RTÉ's "In Concert" series. The group has also appeared on Channel 4 television.
