= John Corcoran (author) =

American educator (born 1939)

- Born: 1939 (age 86–87); Santa Fe, New Mexico
- Education: University of Texas at El Paso (BA)
- Occupations: Teacher and real estate developer

John Corcoran (/ˈkɔːrkərən/ KOR-kər-ən; born in 1939) is an American author and the founder of the John Corcoran foundation. He is severely dyslexic and read at a second-grade level until the age of 48. Despite this, he graduated from high school and college, and worked as a high school teacher and real estate developer without being discovered.

== Early life ==
Corcoran was raised in Santa Fe, New Mexico where his literacy stalled after second grade. He was one of six siblings, and his parents were too overwhelmed to notice the deficit. His teachers at school assigned him to the "dumb row" but were distracted by his disciplinary problems and soon forgot about his reading difficulties.

After graduating high school by cheating, he attended two junior colleges and then University of Texas at El Paso (then called Texas Western). Thanks to an athletic scholarship and aggressive, continual cheating, he was able to graduate in 1961 with a bachelor's degree in education and business administration.

He became a high school social studies teacher. On his personal website, Corcoran describes some of the tricks he used to manage this.

The students wrote their names on a seating chart and then pronounced them for me. To avoid reading the list, I asked them the next day to call out their names, claiming I wanted them to get to know one another.

He switched schools but continued as a teacher for 17 years before becoming a real estate developer in 1977. He was successful for ten years, until his business faltered. After seeing Barbara Bush talk about literacy on television, he resolved to finally learn how to read. After receiving tutoring from a volunteer tutor in a literacy program, he became literate at a 6th grade level.

== Life after literacy ==
Since learning to read, he has written two books. He has since become a spokesman for literacy programs, as well as running his own foundation to help people learn to read. He created the John Corcoran Foundation, which trains tutors and helps students learn to read. He has appeared in the international media, but mostly his coverage is from American media. His appearances include an appearance on The Oprah Winfrey Show, National Public Radio's Eye on Books, and interviews in USA Today and other publications.

== Books ==
- The Bridge to Literacy: No Child—or Adult—Left Behind
- The Teacher Who Couldn't Read: One Man's Triumph Over Illiteracy
