= Thomas Corcoran =

Thomas Corcoran may refer to:

- Thomas Corcoran (footballer) (1909–?), English professional footballer
- Tommy Corcoran (1869–1960), baseball player
- Tom Corcoran (writer) (1943–2023), American writer of mystery novels
- Tom Corcoran (skier) (1931–2017), American alpine skier
- Tom Corcoran (politician) (born 1939), American politician
- Thomas E. Corcoran (1839–1904), U.S. Navy sailor and Medal of Honor recipient
- Thomas Gardiner Corcoran (1900–1981), American lawyer and political figure; advisor to Franklin D. Roosevelt
- Thomas Corcoran (mayor) (1754–1830), mayor of Georgetown, District of Columbia, U.S.
