= Corcoran Woods =

Coordinates: 39°2′3″N 76°25′5″W

Corcoran Woods, also known as Corcoran Environmental Study Area, or the Corcoran Tract, is a woodland preserve located in the northwest section of Sandy Point State Park in Annapolis, Maryland. The area comprises roughly 210 acres (0.85 km^{2}) and is owned by the State of Maryland. Edward S. Corcoran previously owned the 110-acre (0.45 km^{2}) northwest portion of Corcoran Woods.
