= Sandy Point State Park =

State park in Maryland, United States

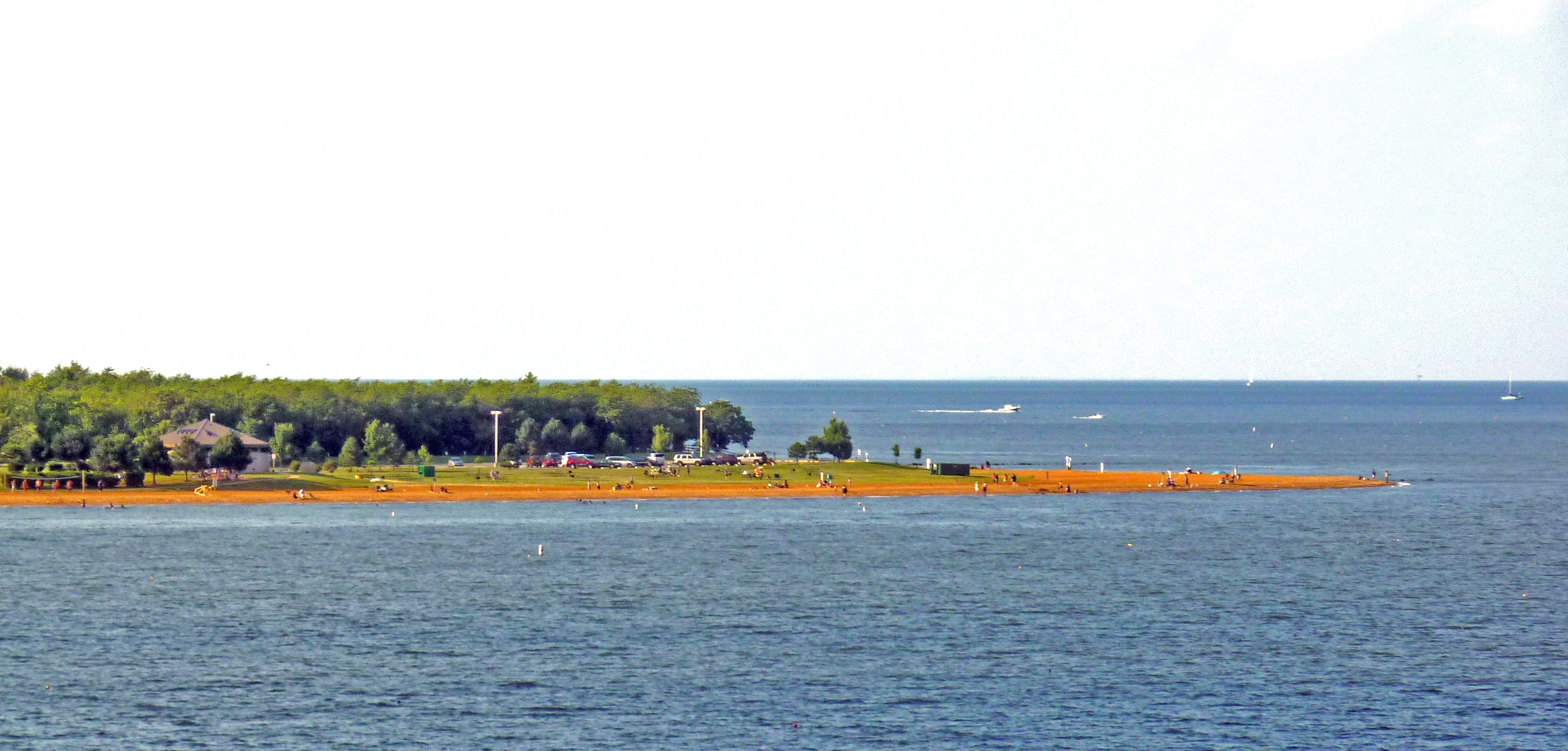
- Sandy Point from the Chesapeake Bay Bridge

- Location within Maryland
- Location: Anne Arundel County, Maryland, United States
- Nearest city: Annapolis, Maryland
- Coordinates: 39°00′41″N 76°23′39″W
- Area: 786 acres (318 ha)
- Elevation: 0 ft (0 m)
- Established: 1948
- Administrator: Maryland Department of Natural Resources
- Designation: Maryland state park
- Website: Official website

Sandy Point State Park is a Maryland state park on the Chesapeake Bay, located at the western end of the Chesapeake Bay Bridge in Anne Arundel County, Maryland. The park is known for the popularity of its swimming beach, with annual attendance exceeding one million visitors. The park grounds include the Sandy Point Farmhouse, which is listed on the National Register of Historic Places. The historic Sandy Point Shoal Lighthouse stands in about five feet of water some 1,000 yards (910 m) east of the park's beach.

== History ==
In 1948, the state purchased the site of a ferry landing that had served the Chesapeake Bay Ferry System on its run across the bay to Kent Island at what is now Matapeake State Park. The park opened in 1952 with racially segregated beaches and bathhouses which led to litigation in 1955. The U.S. Supreme Court ordered the park to become integrated in Mayor and City Council of Baltimore City v. Dawson, which ultimately extended the Fourteenth Amendment to state beaches and other recreational facilities.

== Activities and amenities ==
The park offers swimming beaches, fishing, crabbing, hiking, wildlife viewing, nature center, picnicking, marina store, and boat rentals. The adjacent Corcoran Woods forest preserve includes four miles (6.4 km) of hiking trails. The historic Sandy Point Farmhouse may be viewed from the main park road and is only open to the public on special occasions.

In January, the park hosts the annual Maryland State Police Polar Bear Plunge, where participants run into the Chesapeake Bay to raise money for Special Olympics.
