= Vincent Cross =

- Born: Vincent Cross; 22 August 1971 (age 54)
- Genres: Folk, Bluegrass, Irish traditional music
- Occupations: Singer, songwriter, composer, musician
- Instruments: Guitar, banjo, mandolin, bouzouki, English concertina
- Years active: 1989–present
- Website: www.vincentcross.org

Vincent Cross (born 22 August 1971) is an Irish singer/songwriter known for his Irish song poetry that draws from various traditional folk idioms and ancient myths. He was born in Ireland, raised in Australia, and is now based in New York City. He has released four critically acclaimed albums and performed with artists such as Glen Hansard, Odetta, Damien Rice, The Pogues’ Ron Kavana, and Roy Book Binder among many others.

== Career ==
Cross’s career began in the early 1990s when he moved from Ireland to London where he busked on Carnaby Street and performed at several venues around the city. By the early 2000’s, Cross was touring regularly across Ireland, England, and Scandinavia, making a name for himself in the traditional Irish music scene.

In 2002, he recorded and released his self-titled EP with producer Shane Kerwin. The album caught the ears of Galway Bay FM DJ Jon Richards who included him on two separate nationally released compilation albums, Undercurrents (2001) and Inundations (2002).

In 2006, Cross moved to New York City where he performed at regular bluegrass jams around the city. He formed the traditional bluegrass band Good Company and released his first full-length album Home Away From Home in 2008.

On 8 May 2008, Cross performed at an Odetta tribute concert hosted by Wavy Gravy at Banjo Jim’s. The folk legend would later rave about Cross’ performance, stating “I heard a crystal clear voice that took me back to when I was being introduced to mountain music groups and families of Appalachia. It was a pleasure to hear such beauty coming out of Vincent Cross.”

Cross released his sophomore album A Town Called Normal in 2013 which was followed by Old Songs For Modern Folk in 2016. It reached #2 on the National Folk DJ Albums Chart, hit #68 on Roots Music Report's Top Traditional Folk Album Chart, and was nominated by the Independent Music Awards for Best Tribute Album.

In 2020, Cross released his latest album titled The Life & Times of James “The Rooster” Corcoran. The songs were inspired by James “The Rooster” Corcoran, a 19th-century Irish-American gang leader in New York City, whom Cross is a direct descendant of. It was praised by PopMatters, who described it as “a subtle but powerful portrait,” and Brooklyn Vegan who called it “Compelling [and] timeless.”

In 2021, Cross was published in Voices: The Journal of New York Folklore for his essay titled "Writing the Songs of our Ancestors: A Folk Songwriting Process."

In 2023, he was a finalist in the International Acoustic Music Awards (IAMA) in the Country/Bluegrass category for his unreleased single "In the Eyes of My Father."

== Discography ==
=== Studio albums ===
- Home Away From Home (2008)
- A Town Called Norma (2013)
- Old Songs For Modern Folk (2016)
- The Life & Times of James "The Rooster" Corcoran (2020)

=== EPs ===
- Vincent Cross (2002)
- Laugh My Cry: Vincent Cross & Good Company (2007)
