= John Sullivan (Jesuit) =

Irish Roman Catholic priest

Blessed John Sullivan SJ

Priest
- Born: 8 May 1861; Dublin, Ireland
- Died: 19 February 1933 (aged 71); Saint Vincent's Nursing Home, Dublin, Ireland
- Venerated in: Roman Catholic Church
- Beatified: 13 May 2017, Saint Francis Xavier Church, Dublin, Ireland by Cardinal Angelo Amato
- Feast: 8 May
- Patronage: Ecumenism; Educators

John Sullivan (8 May 1861 – 19 February 1933) was an Irish Catholic priest and a professed member of the Jesuits. Sullivan was known for his life of deep spiritual reflection and personal sacrifice; he is recognised for his dedicated work with the poor and spent much of his time walking and (notably) riding his bike to visit those who were troubled or ill in the villages around Clongowes Wood College, where he taught from 1907 until his death.

From the 1920s onwards, there were people who testified to his healing power despite the fact that he never claimed credit or causation for himself from these reported cases. Sullivan was known for his friendliness; his amiable nature was coupled with a somewhat shy temperament but one willing to aid those who needed it most. He was noted for his strong faith and for imposing multiple penances on himself, such as eating little. Sullivan had long been admired during his life and was known as a man of inspirational holiness which prompted calls for his beatification; the cause later opened and would culminate on 7 November 2014 after Pope Francis confirmed his heroic virtue and named him as Venerable. The same pope approved a miraculous healing credited to his intercession on 26 April 2016. His beatification, the first ever to take place in Ireland, took place within Dublin on 13 May 2017 (Other Irish Saints were beatified in Rome or elsewhere).

== Life ==
=== Childhood and education ===
John Sullivan was born in mid-1861 at 41 Eccles Street in the old Dublin. He was born as the last of five children to Sir Edward Sullivan (7 October 1822 – 13 April 1885) – member of the Church of Ireland and a successful barrister who would later become the Lord Chancellor of Ireland – and Elizabeth Josephine Bailey (1823 – 27 January 1898) – a Roman Catholic from a prominent land-owning household in Passage West. Sullivan was raised as a Protestant and was baptized in the local Church of Ireland parish of Saint George on Temple Street on 15 July 1861. According to the custom of the time, girls were raised as Catholics while the sons were raised as Protestants. The first child was Annie (1852 – 25 January 1918) and then came Edward, Robert and William (23 February 1860 – 7 July 1937).

In late 1861, the household relocated to 32 Fitzwilliam Place in Dublin. In 1873, he was sent to the Portora Royal School in Enniskillen with his brother William. His name is inscribed there on the Royal Scholars Honours Board in Steele Hall. In 1877, his brother Robert (1853–77) drowned after a boating accident in Killiney Bay along with Constance Exham, who was the daughter of a family friend.

After his time at the Portora Royal School, he followed in his father's footsteps and went to Trinity College from 1879, where he studied classics. He was awarded the gold medal in Classics in 1885 and he studied for the English Bar at Lincoln's Inn in London, His father's sudden death was a great shock to him. At the age of twenty-four he came into a comfortable inheritance. During this period, he travelled across Europe and spent time taking walking tours in Macedonia and Greece as well as Asia Minor. He spent several months in one of the Orthodox monasteries on Mount Athos and even contemplated entering it as a monk. He travelled through Southern Italy en route home but was forced to prolong his stay there due to contracting smallpox.

Sullivan was appointed barrister in 1888. "That he was a man of ability, experience and judgement was indicated by his appointment in 1895 by the Conservative government to a commission to investigate the widespread massacre of Armenians in Adana, Asia Minor."

He was a frequent visitor to the Hospice of the Dying at Harold's Cross, where he brought comfort and companionship in addition to small tokens of food and drink as well as clothing to those ill people. Even after he became a teacher at Clongowes Wood College he continued these small luxuries to the poor, including a bit of tobacco while also providing them with tea and sugar as well as oranges and apples. His brother novices remember him for his small kindnesses extended to his classmates.

=== Conversion and priesthood ===
Sullivan was received into the Roman Catholic Church on 21 December 1896 in a celebration that the Jesuit priest Michael Gavin presided over at Farm Street Church in the Mayfair district of central London. His family had expressed their great surprise at his decision to convert to the Catholic faith. "He considered this step, in the same way as St Augustine and St Monica, to be the merit of the prayers of his deeply Catholic mother."

He commenced his Jesuit novitiate on 7 September 1900 at Saint Stanislaus College at Tullabeg. On completion of his novitiate around 1901, he was sent to Saint Mary's Hall at Stonyhurst for his philosophical studies. Having concluded these, he was sent in 1904 to Milltown Park in Dublin for his theological studies and the Archbishop of Dublin William Walsh later ordained Sullivan as a priest in the chapel at Milltown Park on 28 July 1907. He said his first Mass at the convent of the Irish Sisters of Charity at Mount Saint Anne's in Milltown.

Sullivan soon after took up a teaching position at Clongowes Wood College, which was an all-male boarding school the Jesuits managed near Clane, County Kildare. From 25 July 1919 until 20 May 1924, he served as the rector of the Juniorate and Retreat House at Rathfarnham Castle on the outskirts of Dublin. Sullivan then returned to teaching at Clongowes Wood College after this.

Sullivan was untiring in his attention to the sick, and he would travel miles to make a sick call, which was often on foot but also riding a battered bike. Sullivan was "a keen cyclist". On one occasion, a workman by chance passed the chapel at the school at 2:00 am to see Sullivan in deep prayer on his knees. Each Holy Thursday, he spent five or six hours kneeling before the altar.

=== Illness and death ===
In February 1933 he began suffering severe abdominal pains and so was transferred on 17 February from the college to Saint Vincent's Nursing Home in Lower Leeson Street in Dublin, while asking for his breviary to be brought to him. Sullivan died at 11:00 pm on 19 February 1933 with his brother Sir William Sullivan at his side; an old friend who was present at his death said: "He died well". At his funeral, "the whole congregation filed up to touch the coffin with rosary beads, crosses or other pious objects."

He was buried in Clongowes Wood Cemetery, but in 1960 his remains were transferred to the Sacred Heart Chapel of Saint Francis Xavier Church on Upper Gardiner Street.

== Beatification ==
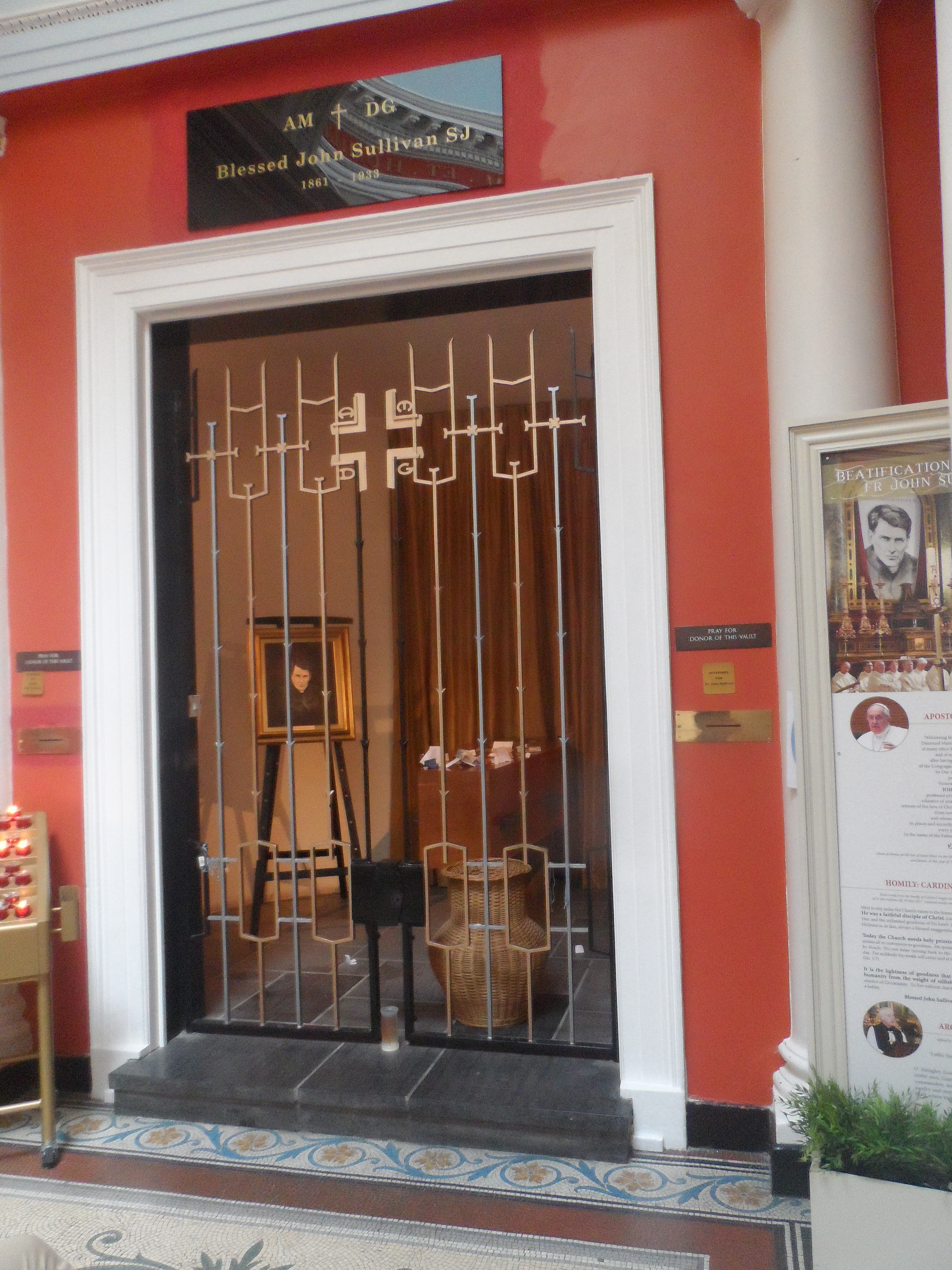
Fr. Sullivan's resting-place in Saint Francis Xavier Church, Dublin

The informative process that opened in 1953 saw him titled as a Servant of God. The accumulation of witness testimonies and documentation being gathered was completed in September 1960. The Congregation for the Causes of Saints was given the evidence and validated the informative process in acceptance in 1969, prior to theologians approving his spiritual writings in 1972. On 22 February 2000, the Congregation issued the official "nihil obstat" to the cause, which acted as a formal introduction to the cause and approval of its continuation.

In June 2002 another process was held in Dublin to collate further evidence, and the findings of this particular tribunal were forwarded to the Congregation, which confirmed it on 18 October 2002. In 2004 the postulation submitted the Positio dossier to the Congregation for examination by consultant theologians and this led to a positive report on its contents on 19 November 2013; the Congregation later confirmed this on 16 October 2014.

On 7 November 2014, he was named as Venerable after Pope Francis – himself a Jesuit – approved a decree acknowledging the heroic virtue of the late priest's life based on the cardinal and theological virtues. Sullivan's beatification depended on the approval of a miracle that was an unexplainable healing after his death; one such case was investigated in Ireland and it received Roman validation on 10 February 2006. The Congregation approved this miracle on 19 April 2016 after the medical experts and theologians approved it. The pontiff – on 26 April 2016 – approved a miracle attributed to the late priest's intercession and thus approved his beatification to take place. The miracle approved was the 1954 healing of a cancerous tumour on the neck of the Dublin woman Delia Farnham.

The beatification was celebrated in Dublin at the Saint Francis Xavier Church on 13 May 2017. He was also the first person to ever be beatified in Ireland.

The current postulator for this cause is the Jesuit priest Anton Witwer. The current vice-postulator is the Jesuit priest Declan Murray.

=== Devotions and legacies ===
Due to his reportedly having the gift of healing, there is a constant demand for blessings with his profession crucifix which had previously belonged to his mother. It is kept in the Saint Francis Xavier Church, where his remains are located in the Sacred Heart Chapel. There is a special Mass celebrated in that church once each month in his honour, and there is also an annual Mass for the same purpose at the same church, celebrated close to the commemoration of his 1933 death.

The people of Kildare created their own monument to the late priest in Clane, close to Clongowes Wood College.

Sullivan had been a Protestant until he reached middle age, and that community was an important aspect of his life. On 8 May 1983, the retired Church of Ireland Archbishop George Simms gave the address at a memorial service to honour Sullivan's life and work, which was held in St. George's Church on Temple Street. The Catholic Auxiliary Bishop James Kavanagh attended and bought with him a text from Pope John Paul II reading: "His Holiness asks you to convey his cordial greetings to all present. In communion of prayer he gives thanks to Almighty God for the extraordinary gifts bestowed on Sullivan during his life and for the spirit of mutual understanding, reconciliation and goodwill which his memory enkindles between various Christian communities in Ireland today".

=== Miracles during his lifetime ===
There have been miracles reported during Sullivan's life, such as the two mentioned below:

- The cure of Michael Collins (b. 1925) – nephew of the famed Michael Collins – from infantile paralysis. The child awoke one night in October 1928 in extreme distress, and the summoned doctor diagnosed him with infantile paralysis. Mrs. Collins drove to the school seeking out Sullivan's assistance; Sullivan promised to say a Mass but also rode his bike to their home, where he touched the child's leg and prayed over him for two hours.
- The cure of Miss Kitty Garry (aged ten at the time) from tuberculosis; he blessed her, and the ailment left her after a month.

== Sources ==
- McGrath, SJ, Fergal., Father John Sullivan, SJ, Longmans Green, 1945
- Morrisey SJ, Thomas J., Where Two Traditions Meet: John Sullivan SJ, The Columba Press, 2009
