= Jimmy Corcoran =

- Born: James J. Corcoran; May 1, 1820; Balbriggan, County Dublin, Ireland
- Died: November 12, 1900 (aged 80); Manhattan, New York, U.S.
- Other names: Paddy Corcoran
- Occupations: Truckman and businessman
- Known for: Founder of the Manhattan shanty enclaves of "Corcoran's Roost" and Kips Bay.
- Spouse: Catherine "Kathleen" Barnwell (m. 1850)
- Children: 10

James J. Corcoran (May 1, 1820 – November 12, 1900) was an Irish-born laborer and well-known personality among the Irish-American community of the historic "Corcoran's Roost" and the Kip's Bay districts, roughly the area near 40th Street and First Avenue in Manhattan, and was widely regarded as the champion of working-class Irish immigrants between 1850 and 1880.

He is alleged to have been somewhat of an underworld figure, under the alias Paddy Corcoran, founding the "Rag Gang", which operated with his sons on the Manhattan waterfront during the late 19th century.

== Biography ==
Corcoran was born in Balbriggan, County Dublin, to James and Catherine Corcoran. He immigrated to the United States when he was 25. He worked as a laborer in New Orleans for a time and also lived in Cold-Spring-on-the-Hudson (present-day Cold Spring, New York) before settling in New York City prior to the American Civil War. He found work as a truckman and, experiencing some prejudice, Corcoran made a home in a squatter colony in Dutch Hill. The colony was constructed on an earth mound near 40th Street and the First Avenue and was considered a high-crime poverty-stricken area of the city.

Corcoran was the first to organize neighboring squatters to build a permanent shanty community. By the 1860s, he had become acknowledged as head of the colony. During its early years, residents feuded with neighboring squatters on Clara's Hill, founded and named by immigrants who had lived in the area of the same name in Mountmellick, County Laois. Frequent fighting led to altercations with police, whom the squatters often turn against to the amusement of onlookers, and Corcoran would often put up bail for offenders and was reputed to have "a caustic tongue and a ready wit" when he arrived at the local station house.

The Corcoran family eventually left the colony and moved to a nearby brick house on East 40th Street but remained involved in the shanty's affairs for another two decades. In May 1899, he offered the deed to Corcoran's Roost as security to release Robert Dougherty on bail from Yorkville Court. Corcoran's wife, Kathleen, mother to his 10 children, died in August 1899. After his wife's death, Corcoran lived for another year before he died at his home "shrived and regretted" on November 12, 1900, age 80. He had been successful in business during his later years, with an estate worth $25,000 and owning several roadhouses, which he left to his four surviving children upon his death.

The earth from Dutch Hill was later partly used to construct present-day Cob Dock at the New York Navy Yard and its site became a tenement district. Tudor City was built on the site of Corcoran's Roost during the late 1920s and a Gothic inscription was later engraved above the entrance of the central Tudor Tower in his memory. A concept album of songs about James Corcoran's life was released by his distant relative, Vincent Cross in 2020 entitled The Life & Times of James "The Rooster" Corcoran.
