= Hey, Boo =

"Hey, Boo" may refer to:

- A famous quote from the Pulitzer Prize–winning novel To Kill a Mockingbird by Harper Lee, or from the book's subsequent film adaptation, To Kill a Mockingbird.
- Boo Radley, the character in To Kill A Mockingbird at whom the quote is directed.
- "Hey, Boo": Harper Lee and To Kill A Mockingbird, a 2010 documentary film about the novel.
