= Atticus Finch =

Fictional character in To Kill a Mockingbird

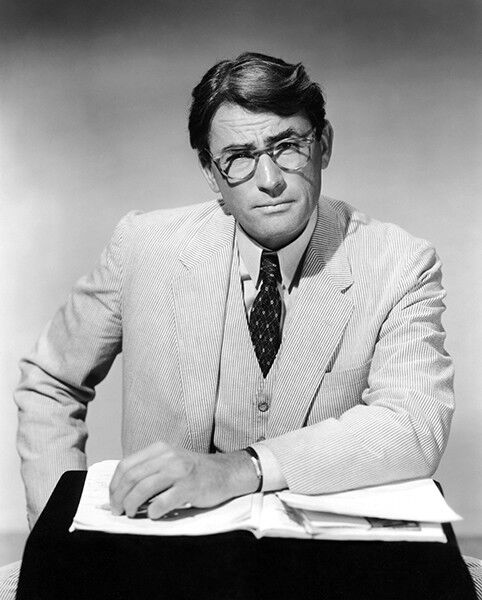
- Gregory Peck as Finch in the 1962 film adaptation
- First appearance: To Kill a Mockingbird (1960)
- Last appearance: Go Set a Watchman (2015)
- Created by: Harper Lee
- Portrayed by: Gregory Peck (1962); Matthew Modine (2009, 2022); Jeff Daniels (2018–19, 2021); Ed Harris (2019–20); Greg Kinnear (2020); Rhys Ifans (2020); Richard Thomas (2020); Rafe Spall (2022); Richard Coyle (2022)

In-universe information
- Gender: Male
- Occupation: Lawyer, Member of the Alabama Legislature
- Family: John Hale "Jack" Finch (brother); Alexandra Finch Hancock (sister)
- Spouse: Jean Graham Finch (deceased)
- Children: Jeremy Atticus "Jem" Finch; Jean Louise "Scout" Finch
- Relatives: Henry Hancock (nephew); Francis Hancock (great-nephew); Edgar (cousin); Joshua (cousin)
- Nationality: American

Atticus Finch is a fictional character and the protagonist of Harper Lee's Pulitzer Prize–winning novel of 1960, To Kill a Mockingbird. A preliminary version of the character also appears in the novel Go Set a Watchman, written in the mid-1950s, but not published until 2015. Atticus is a lawyer and resident of the fictional Maycomb County, Alabama, and the father of Jeremy "Jem" Finch and Jean Louise "Scout" Finch. He represents the African-American man Tom Robinson in his trial where he is charged with rape of Mayella Ewell. Through his unwavering dedication to upholding justice and fighting for what is right, Atticus becomes an iconic symbol of moral integrity and justice. Lee based the character on her own father, Amasa Coleman Lee, an Alabama lawyer, who, like Atticus, represented black defendants in a highly publicized criminal trial.

Book magazine's list of The 100 Best Characters in Fiction Since 1900 names Finch as the seventh-best fictional character of 20th-century literature. In 2003, the American Film Institute voted Atticus Finch, as portrayed in an Academy Award–winning performance by Gregory Peck in the 1962 film adaptation, as the greatest hero of all American cinema. In the 2018 Broadway stage play adapted by Aaron Sorkin, Finch has been portrayed by various actors including Jeff Daniels, Ed Harris, Greg Kinnear, Rhys Ifans, and Richard Thomas.

== Effect on the legal profession ==
Claudia Durst Johnson has commented about critiques of the novel, saying, "A greater volume of critical readings has been amassed by two legal scholars in law journals than by all the literary scholars in literary journals". Alice Petry remarked, "Atticus has become something of a folk hero in legal circles and is treated almost as if he were an actual person". Examples of Atticus Finch's impact on the legal profession are plentiful. Richard Paul Matsch, the federal judge who presided over the Timothy McVeigh trial, counted Atticus as a major judicial influence. One law professor at the University of Notre Dame stated that the most influential textbook from which he taught was To Kill a Mockingbird, and an article in the Michigan Law Review asserts, "No real-life lawyer has done more for the self-image or public perception of the legal profession", before questioning whether "Atticus Finch is a paragon of honor or an especially slick hired gun."

In 1992, Monroe H. Freedman, a professor of law and noted legal ethicist, published two articles in the national legal newspaper Legal Times calling for the legal profession to set aside Atticus Finch as a role model. Freedman then argued that Atticus still worked within a system of institutionalized racism (Jim Crow laws) and sexism and should not be revered. Freedman's article sparked a flurry of responses from attorneys who entered the profession holding Atticus Finch as a hero and the reason for which they became lawyers. Freedman argued that Atticus Finch is dishonest, unethical, sexist, and inherently racist, and that he did nothing to challenge the racist status quo in Maycomb. Freedman's article sparked furious controversy, with one legal scholar opining, "What Monroe really wants is for Atticus to be working on the front lines for the NAACP in the 1930s, and, if he's not, he's disqualified from being any kind of hero; Monroe has this vision of lawyer as prophet. Atticus has a vision of lawyer not only as prophet, but as parish priest."

In 1997, the Alabama State Bar erected a monument dedicated to Atticus in Monroeville marking his existence as the "first commemorative milestone in the state's judicial history".

== Social references ==
Atticus Finch's willingness to support social outcasts and victims of prejudice is the eponymous inspiration for the name of the Atticus Circle, which was an organization composed of "straight allies" (that is, heterosexual people supportive of the LGBT rights movement).

In 2016, the lawyer Joseph Madison Beck published the memoir My Father & Atticus Finch, in which he noted the numerous parallels between his father Foster Beck's defense of a black man accused of raping a white woman in the 1938 trial State of Alabama vs. Charles White, Alias, and Atticus Finch's defense of Tom Robinson in To Kill a Mockingbird. In a letter to the author, Harper Lee herself noted the "obvious parallels" between the cases (Lee was 12 at the time of the Charles White trial) and between Atticus Finch and Foster Beck, though she also stated that she could not recall the trial, and that To Kill a Mockingbird was a work of fiction.

Former U.S. President Barack Obama referenced Atticus Finch as an ideal American character, and mentioned him during his farewell address to the nation on January 11, 2017.

== Go Set a Watchman ==
In July 2015, days before Lee's highly anticipated second novel, Go Set a Watchman, was officially published, the first chapter was released in The Guardian for public viewing. On that day, a New York Times review of the book (which is set about twenty years after the time period depicted in Mockingbird but is not a chronological sequel) revealed that Atticus, depicted in this version as being in his early seventies, is portrayed as a far less progressive character. He makes comments that favor segregation and has attended a Citizens' Council meeting. This has proved controversial to many readers, unaware perhaps that although To Kill a Mockingbird was published first, Watchman is the first draft of the text that later became Mockingbird and the characterizations and key plot details between the two books are not only different but sometimes contradictory.

In terms of plot, Tom Robinson is acquitted in Watchman while in Mockingbird, his unjust conviction as the result of prejudice was a central part of not only the story, but why Atticus is seen culturally as such a righteous and progressive character. His defense is based on not just Robinson's innocence but on his fundamental sense of equality. His closing argument is a more polished version of the progressive argument the adult Jean Louise makes in Watchman and there are other instances where both versions contain the same descriptions word for word. This kind of character development, where motivations and ideals between characters, for reasons of plot, are changed is not unusual in the process of creative writing. Apart from the more progressive depiction of Atticus, the depiction of the town itself, especially the African-American characters, is also dramatically altered between the two drafts. Real-life comparisons with Lee's father, Amasa Coleman Lee, have also been made in the two differing versions of Atticus in that originally Amasa Lee was in favor of segregation but became more liberal later in life, changing his views to support integration. Tay Hohoff, Lee's editor, has also been argued to have played a major part in the character development of the novel and particularly Atticus's liberal transformation. Jonathan Mahler of The New York Times notes in his article The Invisible Hand Behind Harper Lee's 'To Kill a Mockingbird' that Ms. Hohoff, at the same time as she was guiding Ms. Lee through the Mockingbird re-write, was working on her own biography of the early 20th-century New York activist and humanist John Lovejoy Elliot. He notes that the book, A Ministry to Man, was published in 1959, a year before Mockingbird.

== Bibliography ==
- Beck, J. M. (2016). My Father and Atticus Finch: A Lawyer's Fight for Justice in 1930's Alabama. Athens, Georgia : The University of Georgia Press.
- Johnson, Claudia. To Kill a Mockingbird: Threatening Boundaries. Twayne Publishers: 1994. ISBN 0-8057-8068-8
- Johnson, Claudia. Understanding To Kill a Mockingbird: A Student Casebook to Issues, Sources, and Historic Documents. Greenwood Press: 1994. ISBN 0-313-29193-4
- Kakutani Michiko. "Review: Harper Lee's 'Go Set a Watchman' Gives Atticus Finch a Dark Side" nytimes.com: 2015.
- Lee, Harper. To Kill a Mockingbird. HarperCollins: 1960 (Perennial Classics edition: 2002). ISBN 0-06-093546-4
- Mancini, Candice, ed. (2008). Racism in Harper Lee's To Kill a Mockingbird , The Gale Group. ISBN 978-0-7377-3904-6
- Petry, Alice. "Introduction" in On Harper Lee: Essays and Reflections. University of Tennessee Press: 1994. ISBN 1-57233-578-5
- Shields, Charles. Mockingbird: A Portrait of Harper Lee. Henry Holt and Co.: 2006. ISBN 0-8050-7919-X
