= Eugene Current-Garcia =

American academic (1908–1995)

Eugene Current-Garcia (1908-1995) was a professor at Auburn University and became Auburn's Hargis Professor Emeritus of American Literature. He was a founding editor of the Southern Humanities Review and a noted scholar of Southern literature. He was named the first Phi Kappa Phi American Scholar in 1994, the first year of that biennial award.

== Education ==
Eugene Current-Garcia received his A.B. in 1930 and M.A. in 1932 at Tulane University and a Ph.D. in American literature at Harvard University in 1947.

== Academic career ==
He taught at the University of Nebraska from 1936 to 1939 and Suffolk University from 1939 to 1942. He taught at Louisiana State University from 1944 to 1947 and Auburn University from 1947 to 1993. He was a Fulbright lecturer at the University of Salonika, Greece during 1956-1958. He wrote the Bibliographical Guide to the Study of Southern Literature published by the Louisiana State University Press in 1969.

== The Eugene Current-Garcia Award ==
The Eugene Current-Garcia Award for Alabama's Distinguished Literary Scholar is awarded annually at the Monroeville Literary Festival. Winners are selected by the Association of College English Teachers of Alabama, and include: 2018 Dr. David Cowart, 2017 Kirk Curnutt, 2016 Frye Gaillard, 2015 Eric Sterling, 2014 Wayne Flynt, 2013 Sue Brannan Walker, 2012 William A. Ulmer, 2011 David Sauer, 2010 Ralph Voss, 2009 John H. Hafner, 2008 Norman MacMillan, 2007 Elaine W. Hughes, 2006 Nancy Grisham Anderson, 2005 Robert Halli (Dr. Bob Halli), 2004 Benjamin Buford Williams, 2003 J. William Hutchings, 2002 Trudier Harris, 2001 Bert Hitchcock, 2000 Don Noble, 1999 Philip Beidler, and 1998 Claudia Durst Johnson.

== Publications ==
Books by Current-Garcia include: O. Henry in 1965 and O. Henry: A Study of the Short Fiction in 1993, part of Twayne's Studies in Short Fiction. He edited, and wrote extensive annotations (with co-editor Walton R. Patrick), in the first edition of the anthology text American Short Stories; 1820 to the Present in 1952, for Scott, Foresman and Company, which saw multiple revised editions over the next several decades, and in 1985 he wrote The American Short Story before 1850: A Critical History. Other books include Realism and romanticism in fiction : an approach to the novel, published in 1962, and the joint publication, What is the Short Story? in 1961. Twayne publishing was acquired by Gale in 1999 and is one of the imprints of Gale and its parent company Cengage Learning.

Eugene Current-Garcia, Hargis Professor Emeritus of American Literature at Auburn University, first entered the pages of Alabama Heritage Magazine in spring 1987, when he published "Mr. Spirit and His Alabama Wits," an article about Southwestern humorists Johnson J. Hooper and John Barr. In his second article for Alabama Heritage Magazine, Current-Garcia focused his attention on nineteenth-century Alabama wit Joseph Glover Baldwin.

Professor Current-Garcia was especially interested in Southern humorous writers. He wrote "Newspaper Humor in the Old South, 1835-1855" for The Alabama Review. "Southern literature is greatly indebted to these humorists," said Current-Garcia. "The foremost writer we have in modem fiction is William Faulkner, who drew a great deal from Southwestern humor." Current-Garcia was also co-editor of American Short Stories, for several decades the preeminent short story anthology used in colleges and universities. First published in 1952 by Scott, Foresman & Company, some later editions of American Short Stories were co-edited with another fellow Auburn professor, Bert Hitchcock. In 2001, Hitchcock was the recipient of the Eugene Current-Garcia Award for Distinguished Alabama Literary Scholarship from the Association of College English Teachers of Alabama.

== Biography ==
Eugene Current-Garcia was born July 8, 1908, in New Orleans, Louisiana. His parents were Joseph Robustiano and Bertha (Ehrhardt) Current-Garcia. He married Alva Garrett on June 18, 1935, and they had three children. He joined the Auburn faculty in 1947 after completing his studies at Tulane and Harvard. He became Hargis Professor Emeritus of American Literature at Auburn University. He died January 1, 1995.
