= Harry W. Frantz =

American journalist

- Born: November 5, 1891; Cerro Gordo, Illinois, U.S.
- Died: April 26, 1982 (aged 90)
- Education: Stanford University
- Occupation: Editor
- Children: Jean Frantz Blackall

Harry W. Frantz (November 5, 1891 – April 26, 1982) was an international editor and correspondent for the Washington Bureau of United Press International for more than four decades.

== Early career ==
He was born in Cerro Gordo, Illinois and attended Stanford University from 1913-1919. He was an international correspondent for United Press International from 1917 to 1965. In 1923 he was appointed Director of Publicity for Yellowstone National Park and gave the park’s Grand Loop Road its name.

== Government career ==
From 1941 to 1944 he served as the Press Director for the Office of the Coordinator of Inter-American Affairs with the U.S. Department of State, and from 1944 to 1945 he was the Information Officer to the Assistant Secretary of State for American Republics.
