= Encyclopedia of Alabama =

US state online encyclopedia

The Encyclopedia of Alabama is an online encyclopedia of the state of Alabama's history, culture, geography, and natural environment. It is a statewide collaboration that involves more than forty institutions from across Alabama that share their archives with the project. Auburn University hosts the encyclopedia's editorial offices and servers and the Alabama Humanities Foundation holds copyright to the encyclopedia's original content. Funding comes from a variety of sources including the Alabama Department of Education and the University of Alabama.

Historian Wayne Flynt served as the project's first editor-in-chief. Claire Wilson is the current editor-in-chief.

== Alabama Humanities Alliance ==
The Alabama Humanities Foundation (est. 1974), is "the state affiliate of the National Endowment for the Humanities". It began as the "Committee for the Humanities and Public Policy" and in 1986 was renamed "Alabama Humanities Foundation." In 2020, the organization was renamed Alabama Humanities Alliance. It operates from its headquarters in Birmingham.

== See also ==
- List of online encyclopedias
