= Wayne Flynt =

American historian

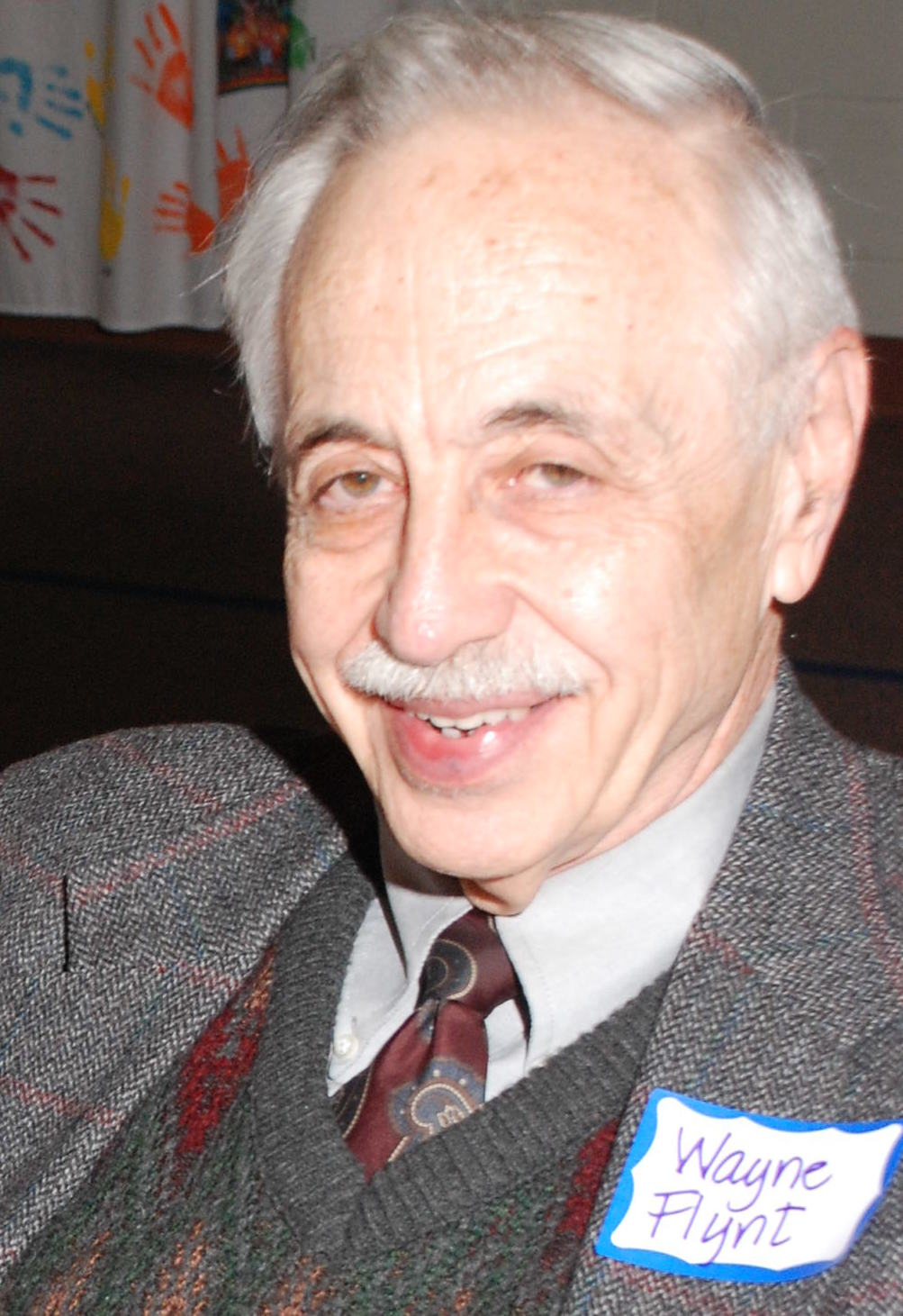
- Flynt in February 2010
- Born: James Wayne Flynt; October 4, 1940 (age 86); Pontotoc, Mississippi
- Education: Samford University (B.A.); Florida State University (M.S., Ph.D.)
- Occupation: Professor of History
- Spouse: Dorothy
- Children: 2

James Wayne Flynt (born October 4, 1940) is University Professor Emeritus in the Department of History at Auburn University. He has won numerous teaching awards and been a Distinguished University Professor for many years. His research focuses on Southern culture, Alabama politics, Southern religion, education reform, and poverty. He was the first Editor-in-Chief of the online Encyclopedia of Alabama. Flynt received his Bachelor of Arts degree from Howard College (shortly before its reorganization as Samford University) in 1961 before taking his Master of Science (1962) and Ph.D. (1965) from Florida State University. After teaching at Samford for 12 years, he joined the faculty at Auburn University in 1977, where he remained until his retirement in 2005. He was a friend of author Harper Lee.

== Biography ==
Growing up, Flynt moved around the South frequently with his parents because his father held a series of sales jobs. The family landed a couple of occasions in Anniston, Alabama, where Flynt graduated from high school in 1958.

Flynt has written 13 books that focus largely on the historical, economic and social fabric of Alabama, including Poor But Proud: Alabama's Poor Whites (1990), and he co-wrote Alabama: A History of a Deep South State, both of which were nominated for Pulitzer Prizes. He is editor-in-chief of the online Encyclopedia of Alabama, a partnership of Auburn University and the Alabama Humanities Foundation. In 1993 he was the subject of an Alabama Public Television documentary.

In 2002, the University of Alabama journalism department named Flynt as the winner of the Clarence Cason Writing Award, given to an author writing about or closely identified with the state of Alabama. He was a longtime friend of Harper Lee, the author of To Kill a Mockingbird; and gave the eulogy at her funeral. Flynt wrote a book about his friendship with Lee after her death in 2016 titled Mockingbird Songs: My Friendship with Harper Lee (2017). He was inducted into the Alabama Academy of Honor in 2006. Wayne Flynt was presented the Eugene Current-Garcia Award in 2004.

Flynt and his late wife Dorothy have two sons, Sean and David.

== Bibliography ==
- Mockingbird Songs: My Friendship with Harper Lee, 2017, published by HarperCollins.
- Keeping the Faith: Ordinary People, Extraordinary Lives, 2011, published by the University of Alabama Press
- Alabama: The History of a Deep South State, 2010, published by the University of Alabama Press
- Alabama in the Twentieth Century, 2006, published by the University of Alabama Press
- Alabama Baptists, 2005, published by the University of Alabama Press
- Dixie's Forgotten People: The South's Poor Whites, 2004, published by Indiana University Press
- Poor but Proud, 2001, published by the University of Alabama Press
- Taking Christianity to China, 1997, published by the University of Alabama Press
- Mine, Mill, and Microchip: A Chronicle of Alabama Enterprise, 1986, published by Windsor Publications, Inc.
- Southern Poor Whites: An Annotated Bibliography with Dorothy S. Flynt, 1981, published by Garland Publishers
- Montgomery: An Illustrated History, 1980, published by Windsor Publications, Inc.
- Cracker Messiah: Governor Sidney J. Catts of Florida, 1977, published by Louisiana State University Press
- Duncan Upshaw Fletcher: Dixie's Reluctant Progressive, 1971, published by Florida State University Press
