= Jean Frantz Blackall =

American professor

- Born: Jean Hargrave Frantz; July 8, 1928; Washington, D.C., U.S.
- Died: July 15, 2025 (age 97); Williamsburg, Virginia, U.S.
- Occupation: Professor of English literature
- Father: Harry W. Frantz

Jean Hargrave Frantz Blackall (July 8, 1928 – July 15, 2025) was a professor of English literature at Cornell University from 1958 to 1994. She often published studies of works by Henry James, Edith Wharton, and the Bröntes.

== Early life and education ==
Frantz was born in Washington, D.C., the daughter of Harry Warner Frantz and Kathleen Hargrave Frantz. Her father was a noted journalist. Her mother was the first librarian of the National Geographic Society. She attended the National Cathedral School for Girls, and graduated from Mount Holyoke College in 1950. She earned a master's degree from Radcliffe College and completed doctoral studies at Harvard University in 1957, with a dissertation on the novels of Henry James.

== Career ==
After college, Blackall was an editorial assistant for the American Red Cross and Harvard College Observatory. She taught at Cornell University from 1958 to 1994. She was the first woman to receive tenure in Cornell's English department, in 1971, and the first woman to become a full professor in that program, in 1978. She was a founding member of the Henry James Society and the Edith Wharton Society. After she retired, she continued teaching literature courses for the Christopher Wren Society at the College of William & Mary.

== Publications ==
Blackall's research appeared in scholarly journals including PMLA, The Journal of Narrative Technique, The Journal of English and Germanic Philology, University of Toronto Quarterly, American Literature, Modern Fiction Studies, The Henry James Review, Studies in Short Fiction, Women's Studies, and the Edith Wharton Review.

- "The Sacred Fount as a Comedy of the Limited Observer" (1963)
- Jamesian Ambiguity and The Sacred Fount (1965, book)
- "Perspectives on Harold Frederic's Market-Place" (1971)
- "Point of View in Villette" (1976)
- "A Suggestive Book for Charlotte Brontë?" (1977)
- "Moral Geography in What Maisie Knew" (1979)
- "Cruikshank's Oliver and The Turn of the Screw" (1979)
- "Literary Allusion as Imaginative Event in The Awkward Age" (1980)
- "The Case For Mrs. Brookenham" (1981)
- "The Sledding Accident in Ethan Frome" (1984)
- "Edith Wharton's Art of Ellipsis" (1987)
- "The intrusive voice: Telegrams in The House of Mirth and The Age of Innocence" (1991)
- "Charity at the Window: Narrative Technique in Edith Wharton's Summer" (1992)
- "Imaginative Encounter: Edith Wharton and Emily Brontë" (1992)
- "The Absent Children in Edith Wharton's Fiction" (1995)
- "Eudora Welty: The Silent Mentors" (1999)
- "Valorizing the Commonplace: Harper Lee's Response to Jane Austen" (2007)

== Personal life ==
In 1960, Jean Frantz married fellow literary scholar Eric Blackall. They had a son, Roger. Her husband died in 1989, and Blackall died in 2025, at the age of 97, in Williamsburg, Virginia.
