= To Kill a Mockingbird =

1960 novel by Harper Lee

- First edition cover – late printing
- Author: Harper Lee
- Language: English
- Genre: Southern Gothic; Bildungsroman
- Published: July 11, 1960
- Publisher: J. B. Lippincott & Co.
- Publication place: United States
- Pages: 281

To Kill a Mockingbird is a 1960 Southern Gothic novel by American author Harper Lee. It became instantly successful after its release; in the United States, it is widely read in high schools and middle schools. To Kill a Mockingbird won the Pulitzer Prize a year after its release, and it has become a classic of modern American literature. The plot and characters are loosely based on Lee's observations of her family, her neighbors and an event that occurred near her hometown of Monroeville, Alabama, in 1936, when she was ten.

Despite dealing with the serious issues of rape and racial inequality, the novel is renowned for its warmth and humor. Atticus Finch, the narrator's father, has served as a moral hero for many readers and as a model of integrity for lawyers. The historian Joseph Crespino explains, "In the twentieth century, To Kill a Mockingbird is probably the most widely read book dealing with race in America, and its main character, Atticus Finch, the most enduring fictional image of racial heroism." As a Southern Gothic novel and Bildungsroman, the primary themes of To Kill a Mockingbird involve racial injustice and the loss of innocence. Scholars have noted that Lee also addresses issues of class, courage, compassion, and gender roles in the Deep South. Lessons from the book emphasize tolerance and decry prejudice. Despite its themes, To Kill a Mockingbird has been subject to campaigns for removal from public classrooms, often challenged for its use of racial epithets. In 2006, British librarians ranked the book ahead of the Bible as one "every adult should read before they die".

Reaction to the novel varied widely upon publication. Despite the number of copies sold and its widespread use in education, literary analysis of it is sparse. Author Mary McDonough Murphy, who collected individual impressions of To Kill a Mockingbird by several authors and public figures, calls the book "an astonishing phenomenon". It was adapted into the 1962 Oscar-winning film of the same name by director Robert Mulligan, with a screenplay by Horton Foote. Since 1990, a play based on the novel has been performed annually in Harper Lee's hometown.

To Kill a Mockingbird was Lee's only published book until Go Set a Watchman, an earlier draft of To Kill a Mockingbird, was published on July 14, 2015. Lee continued to respond to her work's impact until her death in February 2016. She was very guarded about her personal life, and gave her last interview to a journalist in 1964.

== Biographical background and publication ==
Born in 1926, Harper Lee grew up in the Southern town of Monroeville, Alabama, where she became a close friend of soon-to-be-famous writer Truman Capote. She attended Huntingdon College in Montgomery (1944–45), and then studied law at the University of Alabama (1945–49). While attending college, she wrote for campus literary magazines: Huntress at Huntingdon and the humor magazine Rammer Jammer at the University of Alabama. At both colleges, she wrote short stories and other works about racial injustice, a rarely mentioned topic on such campuses at the time. In 1950, Lee moved to New York City, where she worked as a reservation clerk for British Overseas Airways Corporation; there, she began writing a collection of essays and short stories about people in Monroeville. Hoping to be published, Lee presented her writing in 1957 to a literary agent recommended by Capote. An editor at J. B. Lippincott, who bought the manuscript, advised her to quit the airline and concentrate on writing.

Donations from friends allowed her to write uninterrupted for a year. After finishing the first draft and returning it to Lippincott, the manuscript, at that point titled "Go Set a Watchman", fell into the hands of Therese von Hohoff Torrey, known professionally as Tay Hohoff. Hohoff was impressed: "[T]he spark of the true writer flashed in every line," she would later recount in a corporate history of Lippincott, but as Hohoff saw it, the manuscript was by no means fit for publication. It was, as she described it, "more a series of anecdotes than a fully conceived novel." During the following two and a half years, she led Lee from one draft to the next until the book finally achieved its finished form.

After the "Watchman" title was rejected, it was re-titled Atticus but Lee renamed it To Kill a Mockingbird to reflect that the story went beyond a character portrait. The book was published on July 11, 1960. The editorial team at Lippincott warned Lee that she would probably sell only several thousand copies. In 1964, Lee recalled her hopes for the book when she said,

I never expected any sort of success with 'Mockingbird.' ... I was hoping for a quick and merciful death at the hands of the reviewers but, at the same time, I sort of hoped someone would like it enough to give me encouragement. Public encouragement. I hoped for a little, as I said, but I got rather a whole lot, and in some ways this was just about as frightening as the quick, merciful death I'd expected.

Instead of a "quick, merciful death", Reader's Digest Condensed Books chose the book for reprinting in part, which gave it a wide readership immediately. Since the original publication, the book has never been out of print.

== Plot summary ==
The story, told by Jean Louise "Scout" Finch, takes place during three years (1933–1935) of the Great Depression in the fictional town of Maycomb, Alabama, the seat of Maycomb County. Scout, who is six years old at the beginning of the book, lives with her older brother Jeremy, nicknamed Jem, and their widowed father Atticus, a middle-aged lawyer. They also have a Black cook, Calpurnia, who has been with the family for many years and helps Atticus raise the two children.

Jem and Scout befriend a boy named Charles Baker Harris, nicknamed Dill, who visits Maycomb to stay with his aunt each summer. The three children are terrified, yet fascinated, by their neighbor, the reclusive Arthur "Boo" Radley. The adults of Maycomb are hesitant to talk about Boo, and many of them have not seen him for many years. The children feed one another's imagination with rumors about his appearance and reasons for remaining hidden, and they fantasize about how to get him out of his house. After two summers of friendship with Dill, Scout and Jem find that someone is leaving them small gifts in a tree outside the Radley place. Several times the mysterious Boo makes gestures of affection to the children, but, to their disappointment, he never appears in person. One day, Boo's elder brother appears and abruptly encloses the hiding place where Boo had left carved figurines and trinkets for the children.

Judge Taylor appoints Atticus to defend Tom Robinson, a Black man who has been accused of raping a young white woman, Mayella Ewell. Although many of Maycomb's citizens disapprove, Atticus agrees to defend Tom to the best of his ability. Other children taunt Jem and Scout for Atticus's actions, calling him a "nigger-lover". Scout is tempted to stand up for her father's honor by fighting, even though he has told her not to. One night, Atticus faces a group of men intent on lynching Tom. Scout, Jem, and Dill unexpectedly show up, and Scout inadvertently breaks the mob mentality by recognizing and talking heart-to-heart to a classmate's father, causing the would-be lynchers to disperse.

Atticus does not want Jem and Scout to be present at Tom Robinson's trial. No seat is available on the main floor, but the Rev. Sykes, the pastor of Calpurnia's church, invites Jem, Scout and Dill to watch from the colored balcony. Atticus establishes that Mayella Ewell and her father, Bob, are lying. It is revealed that Mayella made sexual advances toward Tom, resulting in her being beaten by her father. The townspeople refer to the Ewells as "white trash" who are not to be trusted, but the jury convicts Tom regardless. Jem's faith in justice is badly shaken. Atticus is hopeful that he can get the verdict overturned, but Tom cannot look at him in the face before being led away. Within 24 hours of the town's attempt to lynch Tom and the close of the trial, it is reported that Tom had tried to escape from prison. He was shot and killed.

Despite Tom's having been convicted and killed, Bob Ewell ends up feeling humiliated by the events of the trial. Atticus explains that he destroyed Ewell's last shred of credibility. Ewell vows revenge, spitting in Atticus' face, trying to break into the judge's house and menacing Tom Robinson's widow. Finally, when Jem and Scout are walking home on a dark night after a school pageant, Ewell violently assaults Jem. Jem suffers a fractured arm and is knocked unconscious in the struggle, but amid the confusion, someone comes to the children's rescue. The mysterious man carries Jem home, where Scout realizes that he is Boo Radley.

Sheriff Tate arrives at the Finch home, after having discovered Ewell dead from a knife wound. Atticus believes that Jem was responsible, but Tate is certain it was Boo. The sheriff tells Atticus that in order to protect Boo, he will report that Ewell simply fell on his own knife during the attack. Boo asks Scout to walk him home, and she readily agrees. After she says goodbye to him at his front door, he disappears, never to be seen again by Scout. While standing on the Radley porch, Scout imagines life from Boo's perspective.

== Autobiographical elements ==
Lee said that To Kill a Mockingbird is not an autobiography, but rather an example of how an author "should write about what he knows and write truthfully". Nevertheless, several people and events from Lee's childhood parallel those of the fictional Scout. Amasa Coleman Lee, Lee's father, was an attorney similar to Atticus Finch. In 1919, he defended two Black men accused of murder. After they were convicted, hanged and mutilated, he never took another criminal case. Lee's father was also the editor and publisher of the Monroeville newspaper. Although more of a proponent of racial segregation than Atticus, he gradually became more liberal in his later years. Though Scout's mother died when she was a baby, Lee was 25 when her mother, Frances Cunningham Finch, died. Lee's mother was prone to a nervous condition that rendered her mentally and emotionally absent.

Lee modeled the character of Dill on Truman Capote, her childhood friend known then as Truman Persons. Just as Dill lived next door to Scout during the summer, Capote lived next door to Lee with his aunts while his mother visited New York City. Like Dill, Capote had an impressive imagination and a gift for fascinating stories. Both Lee and Capote loved to read, and were atypical children in some ways: Lee was a scrappy tomboy who was quick to fight, and Capote was ridiculed for his advanced vocabulary and lisp. She and Capote made up and acted out stories they wrote on an old Underwood typewriter that Lee's father gave them. They became good friends when both felt alienated from their peers; Capote called the two of them "apart people". In 1960, Capote and Lee traveled to Kansas together to investigate the multiple murders that were the basis for Capote's nonfiction novel In Cold Blood.

Down the street from the Lees lived a family whose house was always boarded up; they served as the models for the fictional Radleys. The son of the family got into some legal trouble and the father kept him at home for 24 years out of shame. He was hidden until virtually forgotten; he died in 1952.

The origin of Tom Robinson is less clear, although many have speculated that his character was inspired by several models. When Lee was 10 years old, a White woman near Monroeville accused a Black man named Walter Lett of raping her. The story and the trial were covered by her father's newspaper, which reported that Lett was convicted and sentenced to death. After a series of letters appeared claiming Lett had been falsely accused, his sentence was commuted to life in prison. He died there of tuberculosis in 1937. Scholars believe that Robinson's difficulties reflect the notorious case of the Scottsboro Boys, in which nine Black men were convicted of raping two White women on negligible evidence. However, in 2005, Lee stated that she had in mind something less sensational, although the Scottsboro case served "the same purpose" to display Southern prejudices. Emmett Till, a Black teenager who was murdered for allegedly flirting with a White woman in Mississippi in 1955, and whose death is credited as a catalyst for the Civil Rights Movement, is also considered a model for Tom.

== Style ==
The narrative is very tough, because [Lee] has to both be a kid on the street and aware of the mad dogs and the spooky houses and have this beautiful vision of how justice works and all the creaking mechanisms of the courthouse. Part of the beauty is that she... trusts the visual to lead her, and the sensory.

— Allan Gurganus

The strongest element of style noted by critics and reviewers is Lee's talent for narration, which in an early review in Time was called "tactile brilliance". Writing a decade later, another scholar noted, "Harper Lee has a remarkable gift of story-telling. Her art is visual, and with cinematographic fluidity and subtlety we see a scene melting into another scene without jolts of transition." Lee combines the narrator's voice of a child observing her surroundings with a grown woman's reflecting on her childhood, using the ambiguity of this voice combined with the narrative technique of flashback to play intricately with perspectives. This narrative method allows Lee to tell a "delightfully deceptive" story that mixes the simplicity of childhood observation with adult situations complicated by hidden motivations and unquestioned tradition. However, at times the blending causes reviewers to question Scout's preternatural vocabulary and depth of understanding. Both Harding LeMay and the novelist and literary critic Granville Hicks expressed doubt that children as sheltered as Scout and Jem could understand the complexities and horrors involved in the trial for Tom Robinson's life.

Writing about Lee's style and use of humor in a tragic story, scholar Jacqueline Tavernier-Courbin states: "Laughter ... [exposes] the gangrene under the beautiful surface but also by demeaning it; one can hardly ... be controlled by what one is able to laugh at." Scout's precocious observations about her neighbors and behavior inspired National Endowment of the Arts director David Kipen to call her "hysterically funny". To address complex issues, however, Tavernier-Courbin notes that Lee uses parody, satire, and irony effectively by using a child's perspective. After Dill promises to marry her, then spends too much time with Jem, Scout reasons the best way to get him to pay attention to her is to beat him up, which she does several times. Scout's first day in school is a satirical treatment of education; her teacher says she must undo the damage Atticus has wrought in teaching her to read and write, and forbids Atticus from teaching her further. Lee treats the most unfunny situations with irony, however, as Jem and Scout try to understand how Maycomb embraces racism and still tries sincerely to remain a decent society. Tavernier-Courbin argues that Lee uses heavy irony to mock education, the justice system, and society itself.

Critics also note the entertaining methods used to drive the plot. When Atticus is out of town, Jem locks a Sunday school classmate in the church basement with the furnace during a game of Shadrach. This prompts their black housekeeper Calpurnia to escort Scout and Jem to her church, which allows the children a glimpse into her personal life, as well as Tom Robinson's. Scout falls asleep during the Halloween pageant and makes a tardy entrance onstage, causing the audience to laugh uproariously. She is so distracted and embarrassed that she prefers to go home in her ham costume, which saves her life.

=== Genres ===
Scholars have characterized To Kill a Mockingbird as both a Southern Gothic and a Bildungsroman. The grotesque and near-supernatural qualities of Boo Radley and his house, and the element of racial injustice involving Tom Robinson, contribute to the aura of the Gothic in the novel. Lee used the term "Gothic" to describe the architecture of Maycomb's courthouse and in regard to Dill's exaggeratedly morbid performances as Boo Radley. Outsiders are also an important element of Southern Gothic texts and Scout and Jem's questions about the hierarchy in the town cause scholars to compare the novel to Catcher in the Rye and Adventures of Huckleberry Finn. Despite challenging the town's systems, Scout reveres Atticus as an authority above all others, because he believes that following one's conscience is the highest priority, even when the result is social ostracism. However, scholars debate about the Southern Gothic classification, noting that Boo Radley is, in fact, human, protective, and benevolent. Furthermore, in addressing themes such as alcoholism, incest, rape, and racial violence, Lee wrote about her small town realistically rather than melodramatically. She portrays the problems of individual characters as universal underlying issues in every society.

As children coming of age, Scout and Jem face hard realities and learn from them. Lee seems to examine Jem's sense of loss about how his neighbors have disappointed him more than Scout's. Jem says to their neighbor Miss Maudie the day after the trial, "It's like bein' a caterpillar wrapped in a cocoon ... I always thought Maycomb folks were the best folks in the world, least that's what they seemed like". This leads him to struggle with understanding the separations of race and class. Just as the novel is an illustration of the changes Jem faces, it is also an exploration of the realities Scout must face as an atypical girl on the verge of womanhood. As one scholar writes, "To Kill a Mockingbird can be read as a feminist Bildungsroman, for Scout emerges from her childhood experiences with a clear sense of her place in her community and an awareness of her potential power as the woman she will one day be."

== Themes ==
Despite the novel's immense popularity upon publication, it has not received the close critical attention paid to other modern American classics. Don Noble, the editor of a book of essays about the novel, estimates that the ratio of sales to analytical essays may be a million to one. Christopher Metress writes that the book is "an icon whose emotive sway remains strangely powerful because it also remains unexamined". Noble suggests it does not receive academic attention because of its consistent status as a best-seller ("If that many people like it, it can't be any good.") and that general readers seem to feel they do not require analytical interpretation.

Harper Lee had remained famously detached from interpreting the novel since the mid-1960s. However, she gave some insight into her themes when, in a rare letter to the editor, she wrote in response to the passionate reaction her book caused:

Surely it is plain to the simplest intelligence that To Kill a Mockingbird spells out in words of seldom more than two syllables a code of honor and conduct, Christian in its ethic, that is the heritage of all Southerners.

=== Southern life and racial injustice ===
In the 33 years since its publication, [To Kill a Mockingbird] has never been the focus of a dissertation, and it has been the subject of only six literary studies, several of them no more than a couple of pages long.

— Claudia Johnson in To Kill a Mockingbird: Threatening Boundaries, 1994

When the book was released, reviewers noted that it was divided into two parts, and opinion was mixed about Lee's ability to connect them. The first part of the novel concerns the children's fascination with Boo Radley and their feelings of safety and comfort in the neighborhood. Reviewers were generally charmed by Scout and Jem's observations of their quirky neighbors. One writer was so impressed by Lee's detailed explanations of the people of Maycomb that he categorized the book as Southern romantic regionalism. This sentimentalism can be seen in Lee's representation of the Southern caste system to explain almost every character's behavior in the novel. Scout's Aunt Alexandra attributes Maycomb's inhabitants' faults and advantages to genealogy (families that have gambling streaks and drinking streaks), and the narrator sets the action and characters amid a finely detailed background of the Finch family history and the history of Maycomb. This regionalist theme is further reflected in Mayella Ewell's apparent powerlessness to admit her advances toward Tom Robinson, and Scout's definition of "fine folks" being people with good sense who do the best they can with what they have. The South itself, with its traditions and taboos, seems to drive the plot more than the characters.

The second part of the novel deals with what book reviewer Harding LeMay termed "the spirit-corroding shame of the civilized white Southerner in the treatment of the Negro". In the years following its release, many reviewers considered To Kill a Mockingbird a novel primarily concerned with race relations. Claudia Durst Johnson considers it "reasonable to believe" that the novel was shaped by two events involving racial issues in Alabama: Rosa Parks' refusal to yield her seat on a city bus to a white person, which sparked the Montgomery bus boycott, and the 1956 riots at the University of Alabama after Autherine Lucy and Polly Myers were admitted (Myers eventually withdrew her application and Lucy was expelled, but reinstated in 1980). In writing about the historical context of the novel's construction, two other literary scholars remark: "To Kill a Mockingbird was written and published amidst the most significant and conflict-ridden social change in the South since the Civil War and Reconstruction. Inevitably, despite its mid-1930s setting, the story told from the perspective of the 1950s voices the conflicts, tensions, and fears induced by this transition."

Scholar Patrick Chura, who suggests Emmett Till was a model for Tom Robinson, enumerates the injustices endured by the fictional Tom that Till also faced. Chura notes the icon of the black rapist causing harm to the representation of the "mythologized vulnerable and sacred Southern womanhood". Any transgressions by black males that merely hinted at sexual contact with white females during the time the novel was set often resulted in a punishment of death for the accused. Tom Robinson's trial was juried by poor white farmers who convicted him despite overwhelming evidence of his innocence, as more educated and moderate white townspeople supported the jury's decision. Furthermore, the victim of racial injustice in To Kill a Mockingbird was physically impaired, which made him unable to commit the act he was accused of, but also crippled him in other ways. Roslyn Siegel includes Tom Robinson as an example of the recurring motif among white Southern writers of the black man as "stupid, pathetic, defenseless, and dependent upon the fair dealing of the whites, rather than his own intelligence to save him". Although Tom is spared from being lynched, he is killed with excessive violence during an attempted escape from prison, being shot seventeen times.

The theme of racial injustice appears symbolically in the novel as well. For example, Atticus must shoot a rabid dog, even though it is not his job to do so. Carolyn Jones argues that the dog represents prejudice within the town of Maycomb, and Atticus, who waits on a deserted street to shoot the dog, must fight against the town's racism without help from other white citizens. He is also alone when he faces a group intending to lynch Tom Robinson and once more in the courthouse during Tom's trial. Lee even uses dreamlike imagery from the mad dog incident to describe some of the courtroom scenes. Jones writes, "[t]he real mad dog in Maycomb is the racism that denies the humanity of Tom Robinson ... When Atticus makes his summation to the jury, he literally bares himself to the jury's and the town's anger."

=== Class ===
One of the amazing things about the writing in To Kill a Mockingbird is the economy with which Harper Lee delineates not only race—white and black within a small community—but class. I mean different kinds of black people and white people both, from poor white trash to the upper crust—the whole social fabric.

— Lee Smith

In a 1964 interview, Lee remarked that her aspiration was "to be ... the Jane Austen of South Alabama." Both Austen and Lee challenged the social status quo and valued individual worth over social standing. When Scout embarrasses her poorer classmate, Walter Cunningham, at the Finch home one day, Calpurnia, their black cook, chastises and punishes her for doing so. Atticus respects Calpurnia's judgment, and later in the book even stands up to his sister, the formidable Aunt Alexandra, when she strongly suggests they fire Calpurnia. One writer notes that Scout, "in Austenian fashion", satirizes women with whom she does not wish to identify. Literary critic Jean Frantz Blackall lists the priorities shared by the two authors: "affirmation of order in society, obedience, courtesy, and respect for the individual without regard for status".

Scholars argue that Lee's approach to class and race was more complex "than ascribing racial prejudice primarily to 'poor white trash' ... Lee demonstrates how issues of gender and class intensify prejudice, silence the voices that might challenge the existing order, and greatly complicate many Americans' conception of the causes of racism and segregation." Lee's use of the middle-class narrative voice is a literary device that allows an intimacy with the reader, regardless of class or cultural background, and fosters a sense of nostalgia. Sharing Scout and Jem's perspective, the reader is allowed to engage in relationships with the conservative antebellum Mrs. Dubose; the lower-class Ewells, and the Cunninghams who are equally poor but behave in vastly different ways; the wealthy but ostracized Mr. Dolphus Raymond; and Calpurnia and other members of the black community. The children internalize Atticus' admonition not to judge someone until they have walked around in that person's skin, gaining a greater understanding of people's motives and behavior.

=== Courage and compassion ===
The novel has been noted for its poignant exploration of different forms of courage. Scout's impulsive inclination to fight students who insult Atticus reflects her attempt to stand up for him and defend him. Atticus is the moral center of the novel, however, and he teaches Jem one of the most significant lessons of courage. In a statement that both foreshadows Atticus' motivation for defending Tom Robinson and describes Mrs. Dubose, who is determined to break herself of a morphine addiction, Atticus tells Jem that courage is "when you're licked before you begin but you begin anyway and you see it through no matter what".

External videos
- After Words interview with Shields on Mockingbird: A Portrait of Harper Lee, July 11, 2015, C-SPAN

Charles J. Shields, who wrote the first book-length biography of Harper Lee, offers the reason for the novel's enduring popularity and impact is that "its lessons of human dignity and respect for others remain fundamental and universal". Atticus' lesson to Scout that "you never really understand a person until you consider things from his point of view—until you climb around in his skin and walk around in it" exemplifies his compassion. She ponders the comment when listening to Mayella Ewell's testimony. When Mayella reacts with confusion to Atticus' question if she has any friends, Scout offers that she must be lonelier than Boo Radley. Having walked Boo home after he saves their lives, Scout stands on the Radley porch and considers the events of the previous three years from Boo's perspective. One writer remarks, "... [w]hile the novel concerns tragedy and injustice, heartache and loss, it also carries with it a strong sense [of] courage, compassion, and an awareness of history to be better human beings."

=== Gender roles ===
Just as Lee explores Jem's development in coming to grips with a racist and unjust society, Scout realizes what being female means, and several female characters influence her development. Scout's primary identification with her father and older brother allows her to describe the variety and depth of female characters in the novel both as one of them and as an outsider. Scout's primary female models are Calpurnia and her neighbor Miss Maudie, both of whom are strong-willed, independent, and protective. Mayella Ewell also has an influence; Scout watches her destroy an innocent man in order to hide her desire for him. The female characters who comment the most on Scout's lack of willingness to adhere to a more feminine role are also those who promote the most racist and classist points of view. For example, Mrs. Dubose chastises Scout for not wearing a dress and camisole, and indicates she is ruining the family name by not doing so, in addition to insulting Atticus' intentions to defend Tom Robinson. By balancing the masculine influences of Atticus and Jem with the feminine influences of Calpurnia and Miss Maudie, one scholar writes, "Lee gradually demonstrates that Scout is becoming a feminist in the South, for with the use of first-person narration, she indicates that Scout/Jean Louise still maintains the ambivalence about being a Southern lady she possessed as a child."

Absent mothers and abusive fathers are another theme in the novel. Scout and Jem's mother died before Scout could remember her, Mayella's mother is dead, and Mrs. Radley is silent about Boo's confinement to the house. Apart from Atticus, the fathers described are abusers. Bob Ewell, it is hinted, molested his daughter, and Mr. Radley imprisons his son in his house to the extent that Boo is remembered only as a phantom. Bob Ewell and Mr. Radley represent a form of masculinity that Atticus does not, and the novel suggests that such men, as well as the traditionally feminine hypocrites at the Missionary Society, can lead society astray. Atticus stands apart as a unique model of masculinity; as one scholar explains: "It is the job of real men who embody the traditional masculine qualities of heroic individualism, bravery, and an unshrinking knowledge of and dedication to social justice and morality, to set the society straight."

=== Laws, written and unwritten ===
Allusions to legal issues in To Kill a Mockingbird, particularly in scenes outside of the courtroom, have drawn the attention of legal scholars. Claudia Durst Johnson writes that "a greater volume of critical readings has been amassed by two legal scholars in law journals than by all the literary scholars in literary journals". The opening quote by the 19th-century essayist Charles Lamb reads: "Lawyers, I suppose, were children once." Johnson notes that even in Scout and Jem's childhood world, compromises and treaties are struck with each other by spitting on one's palm, and laws are discussed by Atticus and his children: is it right that Bob Ewell hunts and traps out of season? Many social codes are broken by people in symbolic courtrooms: Mr. Dolphus Raymond has been exiled by society for taking a black woman as his common-law wife and having interracial children; Mayella Ewell is beaten by her father in punishment for kissing Tom Robinson; by being turned into a non-person, Boo Radley receives a punishment far greater than any court could have given him. Scout repeatedly breaks codes and laws and reacts to her punishment for them. For example, she refuses to wear frilly clothes, saying that Aunt Alexandra's "fanatical" attempts to place her in them made her feel "a pink cotton penitentiary closing in on [her]". Johnson states, "[t]he novel is a study of how Jem and Scout begin to perceive the complexity of social codes and how the configuration of relationships dictated by or set off by those codes fails or nurtures the inhabitants of (their) small worlds."

=== Loss of innocence ===
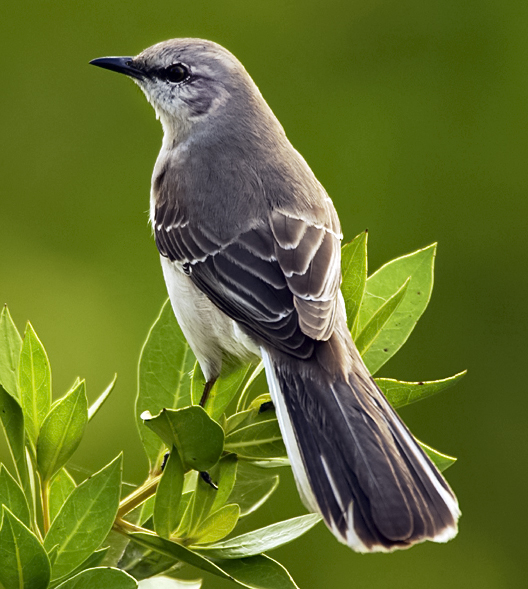
Lee used the mockingbird to symbolize innocence in the novel.

Songbirds and their associated symbolism appear throughout the novel. Their family name Finch is also Lee's mother's maiden name. The titular mockingbird is a key motif of this theme, which first appears when Atticus, having given his children air-rifles for Christmas, allows their Uncle Jack to teach them to shoot. Atticus warns them that, although they can "shoot all the bluejays they want", they must remember that "it's a sin to kill a mockingbird". Confused, Scout approaches her neighbor Miss Maudie, who explains that mockingbirds never harm other living creatures. She points out that mockingbirds simply provide pleasure with their songs, saying, "They don't do one thing but sing their hearts out for us." Writer Edwin Bruell summarized the symbolism when he wrote in 1964, "'To kill a mockingbird' is to kill that which is innocent and harmless—like Tom Robinson." Scholars have noted that Lee often returns to the mockingbird theme when trying to make a moral point.

Tom Robinson is the chief example, among several in the novel, of innocents being carelessly or deliberately destroyed. However, scholar Christopher Metress connects the mockingbird to Boo Radley: "Instead of wanting to exploit Boo for her own fun (as she does in the beginning of the novel by putting on gothic plays about his history), Scout comes to see him as a 'mockingbird'—that is, as someone with an inner goodness that must be cherished." The last pages of the book illustrate this as Scout relates the moral of a story Atticus has been reading to her, and, in allusions to both Boo Radley and Tom Robinson, states about a character who was misunderstood, "when they finally saw him, why he hadn't done any of those things ... Atticus, he was real nice," to which he responds, "Most people are, Scout, when you finally see them."

The novel exposes the loss of innocence so frequently that reviewer R. A. Dave claims that because every character has to face, or even suffer defeat, the book takes on elements of a classical tragedy. In exploring how each character deals with his or her own personal defeat, Lee builds a framework to judge whether the characters are heroes or fools. She guides the reader in such judgments, alternating between unabashed adoration and biting irony. Scout's experience with the Missionary Society is an ironic juxtaposition of women who mock her, gossip, and "reflect a smug, colonialist attitude toward other races" while giving the "appearance of gentility, piety, and morality". Conversely, when Atticus loses Tom's case, he is last to leave the courtroom, except for his children and the black spectators in the colored balcony, who rise silently as he walks underneath them, to honor his efforts.

== Reception ==
Despite her editors' warnings that the book might not sell well, it quickly became a sensation, bringing acclaim to Lee in literary circles, in her hometown of Monroeville, and throughout Alabama. The book went through numerous subsequent printings and became widely available through its inclusion in the Book of the Month Club and editions released by Reader's Digest Condensed Books.

Initial reactions to the novel were varied. The New Yorker declared Lee "a skilled, unpretentious, and totally ingenious writer", and The Atlantic Monthly's reviewer rated the book "pleasant, undemanding reading", but found the narrative voice—"a six-year-old girl with the prose style of a well-educated adult"—to be implausible. Time magazine's 1960 review of the book states that it "teaches the reader an astonishing number of useful truths about little girls and about Southern life" and calls Scout Finch "the most appealing child since Carson McCullers' Frankie got left behind at the wedding". The Chicago Sunday Tribune noted the even-handed approach to the narration of the novel's events, writing: "This is in no way a sociological novel. It underlines no cause ... To Kill a Mockingbird is a novel of strong contemporary national significance."

Not all reviewers were enthusiastic. Some lamented the use of poor white Southerners, and one-dimensional black victims, and Granville Hicks labeled the book "melodramatic and contrived". When the book was first released, Southern writer Flannery O'Connor commented, "I think for a child's book it does all right. It's interesting that all the folks that are buying it don't know they're reading a child's book. Somebody ought to say what it is." Carson McCullers apparently agreed with the Time magazine review, writing to a cousin: "Well, honey, one thing we know is that she's been poaching on my literary preserves."

One year after its publication To Kill a Mockingbird had been translated into ten languages. In the years since, it has sold more than 30 million copies and been translated into more than 40 languages. The novel has never been out of print in hardcover or paperback, and has become part of the standard literature curriculum. A 2008 survey of secondary books read by students between grades 9–12 in the U.S. indicates the novel is the most widely read book in these grades. A 1991 survey by the Book of the Month Club and the Library of Congress Center for the Book found that To Kill a Mockingbird was fourth in a list of books that are "most often cited as making a difference". (Note: To Kill a Mockingbird has appeared on numerous other lists that describe its impact. In 1999, it was voted the "Best Novel of the 20th century" by readers of the Library Journal. It is listed as number five on the Modern Library's Reader's List of the 100 Best Novels in the English language since 1900 and number four on the rival Radcliffe Publishing Course's Radcliffe Publishing Course's 100 Best Board Picks for Novels and Nonfiction. The novel appeared first on a list developed by librarians in 2006 who answered the question, "Which book should every adult read before they die?" followed by the Bible and The Lord of the Rings trilogy. The British public voted in the BBC's Big Read broadcast to rank it 6th of all time in 2003. BBC – The Big Read. Two thousand readers at Play.com voted it the 'Greatest novel of all time' in 2008. (Urmee Khan, June 6, 2008. To Kill a Mockingbird voted Greatest Novel Of All Time, The Daily Telegraph).) It is considered by some to be the "Great American Novel".

The 50th anniversary of the novel's release was met with celebrations and reflections on its impact. Eric Zorn of the Chicago Tribune praises Lee's "rich use of language" but writes that the central lesson is that "courage isn't always flashy, isn't always enough, but is always in style". Jane Sullivan in the Sydney Morning Herald agrees, stating that the book "still rouses fresh and horrified indignation" as it examines morality, a topic that has recently become unfashionable. Chimamanda Ngozi Adichie writing in The Guardian states that Lee, rare among American novelists, writes with "a fiercely progressive ink, in which there is nothing inevitable about racism and its very foundation is open to question", comparing her to William Faulkner, who wrote about racism as an inevitability. Literary critic Rosemary Goring in Scotland's The Herald notes the connections between Lee and Jane Austen, stating the book's central theme, that "one's moral convictions are worth fighting for, even at the risk of being reviled" is eloquently discussed.

Native Alabamian sports writer Allen Barra sharply criticized Lee and the novel in The Wall Street Journal calling Atticus a "repository of cracker-barrel epigrams" and the novel represents a "sugar-coated myth" of Alabama history. Barra writes, "It's time to stop pretending that To Kill a Mockingbird is some kind of timeless classic that ranks with the great works of American literature. Its bloodless liberal humanism is sadly dated". Thomas Mallon in The New Yorker criticizes Atticus' stiff and self-righteous demeanor, and calls Scout "a kind of highly constructed doll" whose speech and actions are improbable. Although acknowledging that the novel works, Mallon blasts Lee's "wildly unstable" narrative voice for developing a story about a content neighborhood until it begins to impart morals in the courtroom drama, following with his observation that "the book has begun to cherish its own goodness" by the time the case is over. (Note: Mallon received hate mail for his commentary, and declined to answer challenges about his observations from professional writers, saying he did not want to be the "skunk at the garden party". (Murphy, p. 18.)) Defending the book, Akin Ajayi writes that justice "is often complicated, but must always be founded upon the notion of equality and fairness for all." Ajayi states that the book forces readers to question issues about race, class, and society, but that it was not written to resolve them.

External videos
- Interview with Mary McDonagh Murphy on Scout, Atticus & Boo, June 26, 2010, C-SPAN

Many writers compare their perceptions of To Kill a Mockingbird as adults with when they first read it as children. Mary McDonagh Murphy interviewed celebrities including Oprah Winfrey, Rosanne Cash, Tom Brokaw, and Harper's sister Alice Lee, who read the novel and compiled their impressions of it as children and adults into a book titled Scout, Atticus, and Boo.

The New York Times announced To Kill a Mockingbird as the best book of the past 125 years on December 28, 2021.

=== Atticus Finch and the legal profession ===
I promised myself that when I grew up and I was a man, I would try to do things just as good and noble as what Atticus had done for Tom Robinson.

— Scott Turow

One of the most significant impacts To Kill a Mockingbird has had is Atticus Finch's model of integrity for the legal profession. As scholar Alice Petry explains, "Atticus has become something of a folk hero in legal circles and is treated almost as if he were an actual person." Morris Dees of the Southern Poverty Law Center cites Atticus Finch as the reason he became a lawyer, and Richard Matsch, the federal judge who presided over the Timothy McVeigh trial, counts Atticus as a major judicial influence. One law professor at the University of Notre Dame stated that the most influential textbook he taught from was To Kill a Mockingbird, and an article in the Michigan Law Review claims, "No real-life lawyer has done more for the self-image or public perception of the legal profession," before questioning whether "Atticus Finch is a paragon of honor or an especially slick hired gun".

In 1992, an Alabama editorial called for the death of Atticus, saying that as liberal as Atticus was, he still worked within a system of institutionalized racism and sexism and should not be revered. The editorial sparked a flurry of responses from attorneys who entered the profession because of him and esteemed him as a hero. Critics of Atticus maintain he is morally ambiguous and does not use his legal skills to challenge the racist status quo in Maycomb. However, in 1997, the Alabama State Bar erected a monument to Atticus in Monroeville, marking his existence as the "first commemorative milestone in the state's judicial history". In 2008, Lee herself received an honorary special membership to the Alabama State Bar for creating Atticus who "has become the personification of the exemplary lawyer in serving the legal needs of the poor".

=== Social commentary and challenges ===
To Kill a Mockingbird has been a source of significant controversy since its being the subject of classroom study as early as 1963. The book's racial slurs, profanity, and frank discussion of rape have led people to challenge its appropriateness in libraries and classrooms across the United States. The American Library Association reported that To Kill a Mockingbird was number 21 of the 100 most frequently challenged books of 2000–2009. In 1966, a parent in Hanover, Virginia, protested that the use of rape as a plot device was immoral. Johnson cites examples of letters to local newspapers, which ranged from amusement to fury; those letters expressing the most outrage, however, complained about Mayella Ewell's attraction to Tom Robinson over the depictions of rape. Upon learning the school administrators were holding hearings to decide the book's appropriateness for the classroom, Harper Lee sent $10 to The Richmond News Leader suggesting it be used toward the enrollment of "the Hanover County School Board in any first grade of its choice". The National Education Association in 1968 placed the novel second on a list of books receiving the most complaints from private organizations—after Little Black Sambo.

With a shift of attitudes about race in the 1970s, To Kill a Mockingbird faced challenges of a different sort: the treatment of racism in Maycomb was not condemned harshly enough. This has led to disparate perceptions that the novel has a generally positive impact on race relations for white readers, but a more ambiguous reception by black readers. In one high-profile case outside the U.S., school districts in the Canadian provinces of New Brunswick and Nova Scotia attempted to have the book removed from standard teaching curricula in the 1990s, (Note: In August 2009, St. Edmund Campion Secondary School in Toronto removed To Kill a Mockingbird from the grade 10 curriculum because of a complaint regarding the language in the book. (Noor, Javed [August 12, 2009]. "Complaint prompts school to kill Mockingbird", The Star (Toronto). Retrieved on August 19, 2009.)) stating:

The terminology in this novel subjects students to humiliating experiences that rob them of their self-respect and the respect of their peers. The word 'Nigger' is used 48 times [in] the novel ... We believe that the English Language Arts curriculum in Nova Scotia must enable all students to feel comfortable with ideas, feelings and experiences presented without fear of humiliation ... To Kill a Mockingbird is clearly a book that no longer meets these goals and therefore must no longer be used for classroom instruction.

Following parental complaints about racist language, the novel was removed from classrooms in Virginia in 2016 and Biloxi, Mississippi, where it was described as making people "uncomfortable", in 2017. In the Mississippi case, the novel was removed from the required reading list but subsequently made available to interested students with parental consent. Such decisions have been criticised: the American Civil Liberties Union noted the importance of engaging with the novel's themes in places where racial injustice persists. In 2021, a group of teachers in Mukilteo, Washington, proposed to take the book off the list of required reading for freshman and off the list of district-approved books to be studied and analyzed in classrooms, arguing that it "centers on whiteness". The school board approved the former but not the latter proposal. Becky Little, of The History Channel, and representatives of the Mark Twain House noted that the value of classics lies in their power to "challenge the way we think about things" (Twain's Adventures of Huckleberry Finn has attracted similar controversy). Arne Duncan, who served as Secretary of Education under President Obama, noted that removal of the book from reading lists was evidence of a nation with "real problems".

Furthermore, despite the novel's thematic focus on racial injustice, its black characters are not fully examined. In its use of racial epithets, stereotyped depictions of superstitious blacks, and Calpurnia, who to some critics is an updated version of the "contented slave" motif and to others simply unexplored, the book is viewed as marginalizing black characters. One writer asserts that the use of Scout's narration serves as a convenient mechanism for readers to be innocent and detached from the racial conflict. Scout's voice "functions as the not-me which allows the rest of us—black and white, male and female—to find our relative position in society". A teaching guide for the novel published by The English Journal cautions, "what seems wonderful or powerful to one group of students may seem degrading to another". A Canadian language arts consultant found that the novel resonated well with white students, but that black students found it "demoralizing". With racism told from a white perspective with a focus on white courage and morality, some have labeled the novel as having a "white savior complex", a criticism also leveled at the film adaptation with its white savior narrative. Another criticism, articulated by Michael Lind, is that the novel indulges in classist stereotyping and demonization of poor rural "white trash".

The novel is cited as a factor in the success of the civil rights movement in the 1960s, in that it "arrived at the right moment to help the South and the nation grapple with the racial tensions (of) the accelerating civil rights movement". Its publication is so closely associated with the Civil Rights Movement that many studies of the book and biographies of Harper Lee include descriptions of important moments in the movement, despite the fact that she had no direct involvement in any of them. Civil Rights leader Andrew Young comments that part of the book's effectiveness is that it "inspires hope in the midst of chaos and confusion" and by using racial epithets portrays the reality of the times in which it was set. Young views the novel as "an act of humanity" in showing the possibility of people rising above their prejudices. Alabama author Mark Childress compares it to the impact of Uncle Tom's Cabin, a book that is popularly implicated in starting the U.S. Civil War. Childress states the novel

gives white Southerners a way to understand the racism that they've been brought up with and to find another way. And most white people in the South were good people. Most white people in the South were not throwing bombs and causing havoc ... I think the book really helped them come to understand what was wrong with the system in the way that any number of treatises could never do, because it was popular art, because it was told from a child's point of view.

Diane McWhorter, Pulitzer Prize-winning historian of the Birmingham campaign, asserts that To Kill a Mockingbird condemns racism instead of racists, and states that every child in the South has moments of racial cognitive dissonance when they are faced with the harsh reality of inequality. This feeling causes them to question the beliefs with which they have been raised, which for many children is what the novel does. McWhorter writes of Lee, "for a white person from the South to write a book like this in the late 1950s is really unusual—by its very existence an act of protest." (Note: McWhorter went to school with Mary Badham, the actor who portrayed Scout in the film adaptation. (Murphy, p. 141)) Author James McBride calls Lee brilliant but stops short of calling her brave:

I think by calling Harper Lee brave you kind of absolve yourself of your own racism ... She certainly set the standards in terms of how these issues need to be discussed, but in many ways I feel ... the moral bar's been lowered. And that's really distressing. We need a thousand Atticus Finches.

McBride also defends the book's sentimentality, and the way Lee approaches the story with "honesty and integrity".

=== Honors ===
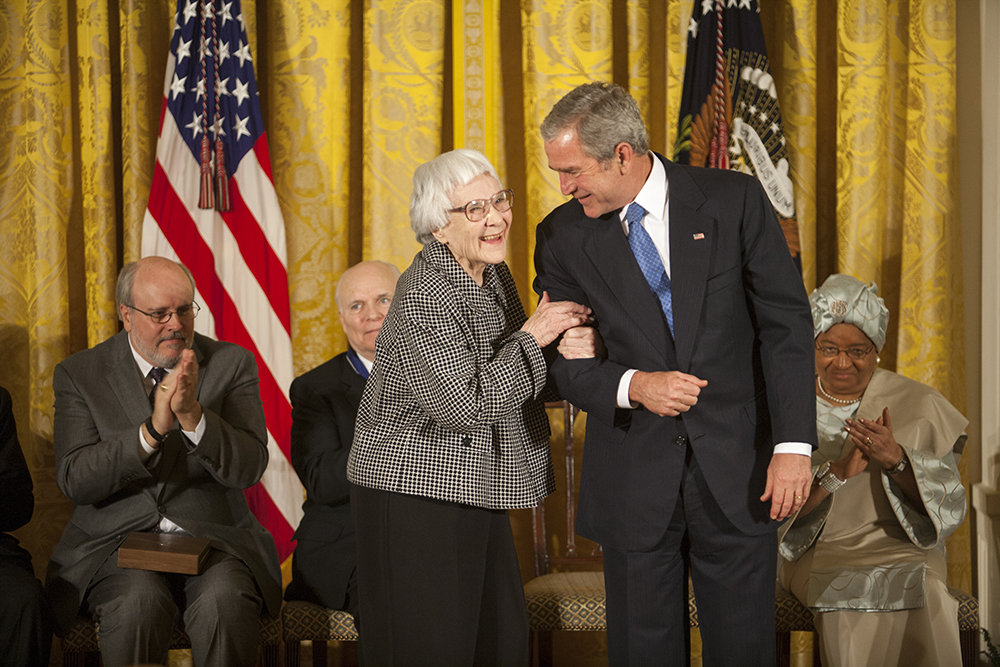
Harper Lee and President George W. Bush at the November 5, 2007, ceremony awarding Lee the Presidential Medal of Freedom for To Kill a Mockingbird

During the years immediately following the novel's publication, Harper Lee enjoyed the attention its popularity garnered her, granting interviews, visiting schools, and attending events honoring the book. In 1961, when To Kill a Mockingbird was in its 41st week on the bestseller list, it was awarded the Pulitzer Prize, stunning Lee. It also won the Brotherhood Award of the National Conference of Christians and Jews in the same year, and the Paperback of the Year award from Bestsellers magazine in 1962. Starting in 1964, Lee began to turn down interviews, complaining that the questions were monotonous, and grew concerned that the attention she received bordered on the kind of publicity celebrities sought. Since then, she declined to talk with reporters about the book. She also steadfastly refused to provide an introduction, writing in 1995: "Introductions inhibit pleasure, they kill the joy of anticipation, they frustrate curiosity. The only good thing about Introductions is that in some cases they delay the dose to come. Mockingbird still says what it has to say; it has managed to survive the years without preamble."

In 2001, Lee was inducted into the Alabama Academy of Honor. In the same year, Chicago mayor Richard M. Daley initiated a reading program throughout the city's libraries, and chose his favorite book, To Kill a Mockingbird, as the first title of the One City, One Book program. Lee declared that "there is no greater honor the novel could receive". By 2004, the novel had been chosen by 25 communities for variations of the citywide reading program, more than any other novel. David Kipen of the National Endowment of the Arts, who supervised The Big Read, states "people just seem to connect with it. It dredges up things in their own lives, their interactions across racial lines, legal encounters, and childhood. It's just this skeleton key to so many different parts of people's lives, and they cherish it."

In 2006, Lee was awarded an honorary doctorate from the University of Notre Dame. During the ceremony, the students and audience gave Lee a standing ovation, and the entire graduating class held up copies of To Kill a Mockingbird to honor her. (Note: Lee has also been awarded honorary degrees from Mount Holyoke College (1962) and the University of Alabama (1990). (Noble, p. 8.)) Lee was awarded the Presidential Medal of Freedom on November 5, 2007, by President George W. Bush. In his remarks, Bush stated, "One reason To Kill a Mockingbird succeeded is the wise and kind heart of the author, which comes through on every page ... To Kill a Mockingbird has influenced the character of our country for the better. It's been a gift to the entire world. As a model of good writing and humane sensibility, this book will be read and studied forever."

After remaining at number one throughout the entire five-month-long voting period in 2018, the American public, via PBS's The Great American Read, chose To Kill A Mockingbird as America's Favorite Book.

In 2003, the novel was listed at No. 6 on the BBC's The Big Read after a year-long survey of the British public, the highest ranking non-British book on the list. On November 5, 2019, BBC News listed To Kill a Mockingbird on its list of the 100 most influential novels. In 2020, the novel was number five on the list of "Top Check Outs of All Time" by the New York Public Library.

== Go Set a Watchman ==
An earlier draft of To Kill a Mockingbird, titled Go Set a Watchman, was controversially released on July 14, 2015. This draft, which was completed in 1957, is set 20 years after the time period depicted in To Kill a Mockingbird but is not a continuation of the narrative. This earlier version of the story follows an adult Scout Finch who travels from New York City to visit her father, Atticus Finch, in Maycomb, Alabama, where she is confronted by the intolerance in her community. The Watchman manuscript was believed to have been lost until Lee's lawyer Tonja Carter discovered it, but this claim has been widely disputed. Watchman contains early versions of many of the characters from To Kill a Mockingbird. According to Lee's agent Andrew Nurnberg, Mockingbird was originally intended to be the first book of a trilogy: "They discussed publishing Mockingbird first, Watchman last, and a shorter connecting novel between the two." This assertion has been discredited, however, by rare-books expert James S. Jaffe, who reviewed the pages at the request of Lee's attorney and found them to be only another draft of To Kill a Mockingbird. Nurnberg's statement was also contrary to Jonathan Mahler's description of how Watchman was seen as just the first draft of Mockingbird. Instances where many passages overlap between the two books, in some case word for word, also refute this assertion. Both books were also investigated with the help of forensic linguistics and their comparative study confirmed that Harper Lee was their sole author.

== Other media ==
=== 1962 film ===
Film producer Alan J. Pakula with Lee; Lee spent three weeks watching the filming, then "took off when she realized everything would be fine without her"

The book was made into the well-received 1962 film with the same title, starring Gregory Peck as Atticus Finch. The film's producer, Alan J. Pakula, remembered Universal-International executives questioning him about a potential script: "They said, 'What story do you plan to tell for the film?' I said, 'Have you read the book?' They said, 'Yes.' I said, 'That's the story.'" The movie was a hit at the box office, quickly grossing more than $20 million from a $2-million budget. It won three Oscars: Best Actor for Gregory Peck, Best Art Direction-Set Decoration, Black-and-White, and Best Writing, Screenplay Based on Material from Another Medium for Horton Foote. It was nominated for five more Oscars including Best Picture, Best Director and Best Actress in a Supporting Role for Mary Badham, the actress who played Scout. At the time, she was the youngest actress nominated in the category.

Lee was pleased with the film, "In that film the man and the part met ... I've had many, many offers to turn it into musicals, into TV or stage plays, but I've always refused. That film was a work of art". Peck met Lee's father, the model for Atticus, before the filming. Lee's father died before the film's release. Lee was so impressed with Peck's performance that she gave him her father's pocket watch, which he had with him the evening he was awarded the Oscar for Best Actor. Years later, he was reluctant to tell Lee that the watch was stolen out of his luggage in London Heathrow Airport. When Peck eventually did tell Lee, she told him, "Well, it's only a watch". He said, "Harper—she feels deeply, but she's not a sentimental person about things". Lee and Peck shared a friendship long after the movie was made. Peck's grandson was named "Harper" in her honor.

In May 2005, Lee made an uncharacteristic appearance at the Los Angeles Public Library at the request of Peck's widow Veronique, who said of Lee:

She's like a national treasure. She's someone who has made a difference ... with this book. The book is still as strong as it ever was, and so is the film. All the kids in the United States read this book and see the film in the seventh and eighth grades and write papers and essays. My husband used to get thousands and thousands of letters from teachers who would send them to him.

=== Plays ===
The book was first adapted as a play by Christopher Sergel. This adaptation debuted in 1990 in Monroeville, a town that labels itself "The Literary Capital of Alabama". The play runs every May on the county courthouse grounds and townspeople make up the cast. White male audience members are chosen at the intermission to make up the jury. During the courtroom scene, the production moves into the Monroe County Courthouse and the audience is racially segregated. Author Albert Murray said of the relationship of the town to the novel (and the annual performance): "It becomes part of the town ritual, like the religious underpinning of Mardi Gras. With the whole town crowded around the actual courthouse, it's part of a central, civic education—what Monroeville aspires to be."

Sergel's play toured in the UK starting at the West Yorkshire Playhouse in Leeds in 2006, and again in 2011 starting at the York Theatre Royal, both productions featuring Duncan Preston as Atticus Finch. The play also opened the 2013 season at Regent's Park Open Air Theatre in London where it played to full houses and starred Robert Sean Leonard as Atticus Finch, his first London appearance in 22 years. The production returned to the venue to close the 2014 season, prior to a UK tour.

In 2018, a new adaptation was written by Aaron Sorkin, debuting on Broadway. The Broadway production was nominated for nine Tony Awards, winning one.

=== Graphic novel ===
In October 2018, Fred Fordham adapted and illustrated the story as a graphic novel. Some of the longer descriptive and commentary passages have been left out – "the bits that children tend to skip anyway" as C. J. Lyons says in her review of the graphic novel in the New York Journal of Books), who goes on to say "the heart of Lee's fictional 1933 Maycomb is faithfully recreated via the art and dialogue".

== Cultural impact ==
External videos
- Interview with Mary McDonagh Murphy on Scout, Atticus & Boo, June 26, 2010, C-SPAN

Parties were held across the United States for the 50th anniversary of publication in 2010. In honor of the 50th anniversary, famous authors and celebrities as well as people close to the book's author, Harper Lee, shared their experiences with To Kill a Mockingbird in the book Scout, Atticus, & Boo: A Celebration of Fifty Years of To Kill a Mockingbird. The book features interviews with Mary Badham, Tom Brokaw, Oprah Winfrey, Anna Quindlen, Richard Russo, as well as Harper Lee's sister, Alice Finch Lee.

The 2010 documentary film Hey, Boo: Harper Lee & To Kill a Mockingbird focuses on the background of the book and the film as well as their impact on readers and viewers.

According to a National Geographic article, the novel is so revered in Monroeville that people quote lines from it like Scripture; however, Harper Lee herself refused to attend any performances, because "she abhors anything that trades on the book's fame". To underscore this sentiment, Lee demanded that a book of recipes named Calpurnia's Cookbook not be published and sold out of the Monroe County Heritage Museum. David Lister in The Independent states that Lee's refusal to speak to reporters made them desire to interview her all the more, and her silence "makes Bob Dylan look like a media tart". Despite her discouragement, a rising number of tourists made Monroeville their destination, hoping to see Lee's inspiration for the book, or Lee herself. Local residents call them "Mockingbird groupies", and although Lee was not reclusive, she refused publicity and interviews with an emphatic "Hell, no!"

== See also ==
- Southern United States literature
- Alabama literature
- Timeline of the civil rights movement
