= Women's Studies (journal) =

- Discipline: Women's studies
- Language: English
- Edited by: Wendy Martin

Publication details
- History: 1972–present
- Publisher: Taylor & Francis
- Frequency: 8/year
- Open access: Hybrid
- Impact factor: 0.3 (2023)

Standard abbreviations
- ISO 4: Women's Stud.

Indexing
- ISSN: 0049-7878 (print); 1547-7045 (web)
- LCCN: 74641303
- OCLC no.: 01791887

Links
- Journal homepage

Women's Studies is a peer-reviewed academic journal of women's studies. The journal has been edited by Wendy Martin (Claremont Graduate University) since its establishment in 1972, and is published eight times per year. It was originally published by Gordon and Breach Science Publishers until 1999, briefly by Harwood Academic (2000–2001), and from 2002 onwards by Taylor and Francis.

== Abstracting and indexing ==
The journal is indexed and abstracted in the following bibliographic databases:

- Abstracts in Anthropology
- America: History and Life
- Arts and Humanities Citation Index
- Communication Abstracts
- Current Contents/Arts & Humanities
- ERIH/Gender Studies
- Family Studies Abstracts
- Film Literature Index
- H.W. Wilson Humanities Index & Social Sciences Retrospective
- H.W. Wilson Humanities Index Retrospective
- H.W. Wilson Humanities Index/Abstracts
- Historical Abstracts
- International Bibliography of the Social Sciences
- MLA International Bibliography
- Sociological Abstracts
- Studies on Women and Gender Abstracts
- The Expanded Academic Index
- Women's Studies Abstracts

According to the Journal Citation Reports, the journal has a 2023 impact factor of 0.3. According to Scopus, the journal has a CiteScore of 0.4, ranking 84 out of 173 in the category 'General Arts and Humanities', 159 out of 213 in the category 'Gender Studies', and 220 out of 275, in the category 'General Social Sciences'.
