= Tay Hohoff =

American novelist (1898-1974)

- Born: Therese von Hohoff; July 3, 1898
- Died: January 5, 1974 (aged 75); Manhattan, New York, US
- Occupation: Literary editor
- Known for: Editing To Kill A Mockingbird
- Spouse(s): John Edgar Welsh (1921–1929), Arthur Haviland Torrey (1931–1973)
- Children: 2

Therese von Hohoff Torrey, better known as Tay Hohoff (July 3, 1898 — January 5, 1974), was an American literary editor with the publishing firm J. B. Lippincott & Co. Strong-willed and forceful, she worked closely with author Harper Lee over the course of two years to give final shape to her classic novel To Kill A Mockingbird. After the commercial and literary success of the novel, she shielded Harper Lee from the intense pressure to write another one. She retired from a senior editorial position at the firm in 1973 and died the following year.

== Personal life ==
Tay Hohoff's parents, Ernest Albrecht Hohoff Jr. and Anna Walter Hallock, raised her in a multi-generational Quaker home in Brooklyn, near Prospect Park. She attended Brooklyn Friends, a Quaker school near her home. In 1919 she married Lewis Edgar Welsh (1888–after 1929), an architect and artist. They had a daughter, Anne Torrey Welsh (1922–1980) and a son, John Hallock Welsh (born 1924). The marriage ended in divorce in 1929. In 1931 she married Arthur Haviland Torrey (1894–1973), a literary agent. On June 15, 1951, her daughter, Anne Torrey Welsh, married Dr. Grady Harrison Nunn, a professor of political science at the University of Alabama, Tuscaloosa. The Nunns named their only daughter for her grandmother: Therese von Hohoff Nunn.

Tay Hohoff was small and wiry with a deep, gravelly voice. She was a chain-smoker. She died in Manhattan.

== Career ==
In New York in the 1930s she opened the office of Torrey Hohoff, Press Representatives along with her husband, Arthur Haviland Torrey. During the 1930s she also worked as a book editor, first at Cosmopolitan Book Corporation, then at Bobbs-Merrill Company.

In 1942 Tay Hohoff joined J. B. Lippincott & Co., a large and well-known American publishing company. She acted as literary editor for several authors, including Harper Lee, Nicholas Delbanco, Thomas Pynchon, Eugenia Price, Zelda Popkin, Wayne Greenhaw, and Lane Kauffmann.

Hohoff contributed to a corporate history of J. B. Lippincott & Co. that was brought out in 1967 on the occasion of the firm's 175th anniversary. She retired from the firm in 1973 as a senior vice president, a senior editorial position that was rare for a woman to hold at a major publishing house at that time.

An author herself, Hohoff published A Ministry to Man in 1959. It was a biography of John Lovejoy Elliott, a social activist and humanist in early 20th-century New York who had committed his life to helping the city's underclass. The same year, Hohoff also published a children's book The Cat Who Wanted Out, with illustrations by Bogdan Grom. In 1973 Hohoff published a memoir, Cats and Other People. In 1975 the book was read by Gillian Neumann in audiobook format on cassette tape.

== Literary editor ==
Tay Hohoff worked closely with her authors to transform their manuscripts into critically acclaimed novels through several edits and rewrites.

"Hohoff was a terrific editor. She would go through the manuscript and jot down little questions in the margins. From those questions, you would start questioning your own work."
—Wayne Greenhaw

"I suffer from some sort of mother-complex, so that I always want to make paths smooth for the people I am fond of and of whom I have a high opinion."
—Tay Hohoff in a six-and-a-half-page typewritten letter to Edward Burlingame, executive editor of Lippincott (1969)

She cut Nicholas Delbanco's 1968 novel, Grasse, 3/23/66 from 500 pages to less than 200.

"She was closely attentive and tough, but I never felt manhandled by her."
—Nicholas Delbanco

When Hohoff first saw Harper Lee's manuscript in 1957, she considered it to be "more a series of anecdotes than a fully conceived novel" though "the spark of the true writer flashed in every line".

Over the course of the next two years, she guided Harper Lee until the book finally achieved its finished shape and was retitled To Kill a Mockingbird.

Once during the long editorial process, Lee lost confidence in herself and threw her manuscript out her window and into the snow. When she called her editor in tears, Hohoff "told her to march outside immediately and pick up the pages". The commercial and critical success of the novel led to pressure on Lee to publish a second novel but Hohoff "guarded Nelle like a junkyard dog".

After their successful collaboration, Hohoff and Lee remained close. When Lee found an extra-toed kitten huddled against a pipe in the basement of her apartment building, she persuaded Hohoff and her husband to adopt him. "She knew us very well and pulled out all the right stops," Hohoff wrote in her memoir. When Hohoff died in 1974, Lee felt devastated.

== Legacy ==
In 2015, HarperCollins (US) and Heinemann (UK) published Go Set a Watchman, an early draft for To Kill A Mockingbird. Therese Nunn, Hohoff's granddaughter, said that it was disrespectful to her grandmother's work and legacy that the novel was published after only a light edit, considering the effort that went into changing and polishing To Kill A Mockingbird.

Jonathan Mahler of the New York Times compared the two books and praised Hohoff's large role "in reconceiving the story from a dark tale of a young woman's disillusionment with her father's racist views, to a redemptive one of moral courage and human decency". Mark Lawson of The Guardian found Go Set a Watchman more complex but less compelling than To Kill A Mockingbird, saying that "it is hard not to feel some awe at the literary midwives who spotted, in the original conception, the greater literary sibling that existed in embryo. If the text now published had been the one released in 1960, it would almost certainly not have achieved the same greatness." Todd Leopold of CNN wrote that "Lee's graceful, drily witty voice, at once childlike and knowing [...] isn't lost in "Watchman," but one can see the impact of having a strong editor." He concluded that "The value of a good editor cannot be overstated."

== Bibliography ==
- A Ministry to Man: The life of John Lovejoy Elliott, a biography (1959)
- The Cat Who Wanted Out (1959)
- The Author and His Audience: With a Chronology of Major Events in the Publishing History of J. B. Lippincott Company. (1967) - contributing author
- Cats And Other People (1973)
