= List of To Kill a Mockingbird characters =

Harper Lee's To Kill a Mockingbird was published in 1960. Instantly successful, widely read in middle and high schools in the United States, it has become a classic of modern American literature, winning the Pulitzer Prize. She wrote the novel Go Set a Watchman in the mid-1950s and published it in July 2015 as a sequel to Mockingbird, but it was later confirmed to be merely her first draft of To Kill a Mockingbird. Multiple attempts to get To Kill a Mockingbird banned have failed and have never lasted for long.

== Main Characters ==
=== Atticus Finch ===
Atticus Finch is the father of Jem and Scout Finch. He is a lawyer who appears to support racial equality and is appointed to represent Tom Robinson, a black man who has been accused of raping a young white woman, Mayella Ewell. The town disapproves of his defending Tom especially when he makes clear his intent to defend Tom Robinson to the best of his abilities. He is an honest person who tries to help everyone he could. Once known as "One-shot Finch" and "the deadest shot in Maycomb County", he is the moral center of the story.

He is portrayed by Gregory Peck in the film adaptation of To Kill a Mockingbird.

=== Scout Finch ===
Jean Louise "Scout" Finch, as an adult, is the narrator of To Kill a Mockingbird and Go Set a Watchman. She comments on how she could not understand something at the time but now can appreciate it. She gets into trouble with Miss Caroline, her teacher, because she is expected to learn reading and writing her way. She is a tomboy and spends most of her time with her brother Jem and best friend Dill. To Jem's advice to pretend to "be a lady and start sewing or something", she answers, "Hell, no". The hints the narrator gives us about her grown-up life reveal that she has not attempted to change herself to please.

She matures from age 6 to age 9 as the novel progresses but remains naive and idealistic, despite an increased understanding of human nature and racism in her town. At the beginning of the book, Scout is confused by some of the words and names she hears people directing toward her father, such as "nigger-lover". Being only six, Scout does not know how to handle such situations, so she tries to resolve her problems by fighting, or by talking to Atticus about what she has heard. By the end of the book, Scout realizes that racism does exist and comes to terms with its presence in her town. Scout also learns how to deal with others, including the Finch family housekeeper, Calpurnia, and her aunt, Alexandra. Scout is the only one of the novel's primary three children (Dill, Jem, and herself) to see and speak to Boo Radley during the course of the novel and realize that he is harmless, despite her initial fear of him. She unintentionally stops a mob about to lynch Tom Robinson by talking to the mob leader, Mr. Cunningham, who she knows as Walter Cunningham's father.

She is portrayed by Mary Badham in the film.

=== Jem Finch ===
Jeremy Atticus "Jem" Finch is Atticus' son and Scout's older brother by four years. Jem's progression into adult maturity is apparent throughout the course of the novel. He is seen to have a greater understanding of the obstacles thrown their way. Jem explains many things to Scout throughout the novel. Bob Ewell breaks Jem's arm during his assault on the Finch children, subsequently resulting in it being shorter than it had been. He is portrayed by Phillip Alford in the film adaptation of To Kill a Mockingbird. At the beginning of Go Set a Watchman, an earlier draft of To Kill a Mockingbird, Jem has already died of the heart condition that killed their mother.

=== Dill Harris ===
Charles Baker "Dill" Harris is a short, smart boy who visits Maycomb every summer from Meridian, Mississippi and stays with his Aunt Rachel (Aunt Stephanie in the film). Dill is the best friend of both Jem and Scout, and his goal throughout the novel is to get Boo Radley to come out of his house. The children concoct many plans to lure Boo Radley out of his house for a few summers until Atticus tells them to stop. In chapter 5 of the novel, Dill promises to marry Scout and they become "engaged." One night Dill runs away from his home, arriving in Maycomb County where he hides under Scout's bed. When she finds Dill, he tells both Scout and Atticus that he was chained to a wall in his father's basement; later, he confesses he actually ran away because he felt he was being replaced by his stepfather.

Unlike Scout and Jem, Dill lacks the security of family support. He is unwanted and unloved by his mother and stepfather. Francis Hancock implies he doesn't have a home, just getting passed around from one relative to another. Dill maintains he has a father, but does not know whether his father is alive or not; or if he will ever see him again.

He is played by John Megna in the film. Dill Harris is believed to be based on a childhood friend of Harper Lee, the author Truman Capote.

=== Calpurnia ===
Calpurnia, nicknamed Cal, is the Finch family's African-American housekeeper, whom the children love and Atticus deeply respects (he remarks in her defense that she "never indulged [the children] like most colored nurses"). She is an important figure in Scout's life, providing discipline, instruction, and love. She also fills the maternal role for the children after their mother's death. Calpurnia is a mother herself and raised her son, Zeebo, to adulthood. Calpurnia is one of the few black characters in the novel who is able to read and write, and it is she who taught Scout to write. She learned how to read from Miss Maudie's aunt, Miss Buford, who taught her how to read out of Blackstone's Commentaries, a book given to her. Aunt Alexandra initially despised Calpurnia because Alexandra believed that Calpurnia was not a "maternal figure" for Jem and Scout, especially for Scout, but later develops some respect for her.

Calpurnia is a member of the First Purchase M.E. African Church in Maycomb. While Scout always hears her speak "proper" English, she is surprised to learn that Calpurnia does not do so at church, especially with the uneducated members of the congregation.

While everyone in the novel is filtered through Scout's perception, Calpurnia appears for a long time more as Scout's idea of her than as a real person. At the beginning of the novel, Scout appears to think of Calpurnia as the wicked stepmother to Scout's own Cinderella. However, towards the end of the book, Scout views Calpurnia as someone she can look up to, and realizes Calpurnia has only protected her over the years. She is played by Estelle Evans in the film.

=== Aunt Alexandra ===
Alexandra Hancock (née Finch) is Atticus' and Jack's sister, married to James "Uncle Jimmy" Hancock. Her son, Henry, is married and has a spoiled child named Francis, who lives with her every Christmas. Aunt Alexandra decides to leave her husband at the Finch family homestead, Finch's Landing, to come to stay with Atticus. Aunt Alexandra doesn't consider the black Calpurnia to be a good motherly figure for Jem and Scout; she disapproves of Scout being a tomboy. She encourages Scout to act more ladylike; wanting to make Scout into a southern belle. This is the cause of many conflicts between Scout and her aunt. However, Scout later sees how much her aunt cares for her father and what a strong woman she is. This is especially evidenced by a tea party when Scout is horrified by the racism displayed, and her aunt and Miss Maudie help her deal with her feelings. By the end of the book, it's clear that Alexandra cares very much for her niece and nephew, though she and Scout will probably never really get along.

=== Jack Finch ===
John Hale "Jack" Finch is the younger brother of Atticus and Alexandra. He is about 40. Jack smells like alcohol and something sweet and it is said that he and Alexandra have similar features. Jack is a childless doctor who can always make Scout and Jem laugh, and they adore him. He and Miss Maudie are close to the same age; he frequently teases her with marriage proposals, which she always declines.

=== Boo Radley ===
The Maycomb children believe that Arthur "Boo" Radley, a recluse, is a "haint". Boo is a lonely man who attempts to reach out to Jem and Scout for love and friendship, such as leaving them small gifts and figures in a tree knothole. Jem starts to have a different understanding of Radley. Scout finally meets him at the very end of the book, when he saves the children's lives from Bob Ewell. At first, Scout does not recognize him. She describes him as being sickly white, with a thin mouth, thin and feathery hair and grey eyes almost as if he were blind. While standing on his porch after Boo rescues Jem, she realizes that he is not that lonely. When Bob Ewell tries to murder the Finch children, no one sees what happens in the scuffle but Ewell is dead and it is Radley who carries an unconscious Jem into the Finch's house. He is played by Robert Duvall in his first ever film role.

=== Tom Robinson ===
Thomas "Tom" Robinson is an African-American who has three children with his wife, Helen. He is accused and put on trial for the rape of a white woman, Mayella Ewell. Atticus is assigned to defend him and stands up to a lynch mob intent on exacting their own justice against him before the trial begins. Tom's left arm is crippled and useless, the result of an accident with a cotton gin when he was a child. Atticus uses this fact as the cornerstone of his defense strategy, pointing out that the nature of Mayella's facial injuries strongly suggests a left-handed assailant. Tom testifies that he had frequently helped Mayella with household chores because he felt sorry for her and the family's difficult life - a statement that shocks the all-white, male jury. Despite Atticus' skilled defense, the jury's racial prejudices lead them to find Tom guilty. Atticus plans to appeal the verdict, but before he can do so, Tom is shot and killed while trying to escape the prison where he is being held. Tom Robinson is played by Brock Peters.

=== Bob Ewell ===
Robert E. Lee "Bob" Ewell is the main antagonist of To Kill a Mockingbird. He has a daughter named Mayella, and a younger son named Burris, as well as six other unnamed children, all of whom are left to fend for themselves. The Ewells are the lowest of the low in the white community of Maycomb; regarded as "white trash", they live in a squalid, cramped shack next to the town garbage heap, are uneducated and resort to crime to survive. Bob is a violent, racist, unemployed alcoholic who poaches to feed his family because he spends the money the family obtains from government "relief checks" on alcohol, and the local authorities turn a blind eye to his poaching out of pity as they know it is the only way his children will be fed. It is implied that he is the one who abused his daughter Mayella, not Tom Robinson (the African American man accused of doing so). It is clear in the text that Tom Robinson was convicted because he is a black man whose accuser was white. Upon hearing of Tom's death, Ewell is gleeful, gloating about his success. After being humiliated at the trial by Atticus however, he goes on a quest for revenge, becoming increasingly violent. He begins by spitting in Atticus' face, followed by a failed attempt to break into the home of Judge Taylor. He then menaces Helen, the poor widow of Tom Robinson and later attempts to murder Jem and Scout Finch with a knife to complete his revenge. Boo Radley saves Jem and Scout and it is implied that Boo kills Ewell with the knife. Heck Tate, the sheriff, puts in the official report that Bob Ewell fell on his own knife and died after lying under a tree for 45 minutes. Ewell is played by James Anderson in the 1962 film.

=== Mayella ===
Mayella Violet Ewell, 19, is the oldest of the eight Ewell children. She is abused, unloved and lonely, and her father, Bob, publicly reveals his contempt for her in court when asked if he is her father, he crassly retorts he only assumes he is her father, but because his wife is dead he'll never know for sure. Before the trial, Mayella is noted for growing red geraniums outside her otherwise filthy and rundown shack to try and bring some beauty into her life. Due to her family's living situation, Mayella has no opportunity for human contact or love, and it is strongly implied that her father has been sexually abusing her for years. She eventually gets so desperate for affection that she attempts to seduce a black man, Tom Robinson. She does this by saving up nickels to send her siblings to go get ice cream so that she can be alone with Tom. Her father sees this through a window and punishes her with a savage beating. Ewell tells Heck Tate, the sheriff, that Tom has raped and beaten his daughter. At the trial, Atticus points out that only the right side of Mayella's face is injured, suggesting a left-handed assailant; Tom's left arm is mangled and useless, but Bob Ewell is left-handed. When Atticus asks her if she has friends, she becomes confused and even insulted because she does not know what a friend is. During her testimony, Atticus' polite speech confuses her and she thinks he's mocking her when he calls her "Miss Mayella." She testifies against Tom Robinson. Mayella is played by Collin Wilcox in the film.

=== Miss Maudie ===
Miss Maude "Maudie" Atkinson, a widow of about 40, lives across the road from the Finches, and she is one of the few adults that Jem and Scout hold in high regard and respect. She had known them all her life, being the daughter of Dr. Frank Buford, their neighbouring landowner to the Finch ancestral home, Finch's Landing. She enjoys baking and gardening; her cakes are held in especially high regard. However, she is frequently harassed by devout "Foot-Washing Baptists", who tell her that her enjoyment of gardening is a sin. The Foot-Washing Baptists also believe that women are a sin "by definition". Miss Maudie befriends Scout and Jem and tells them stories about Atticus as a boy. She does not act condescendingly towards them, even though they are young children. When she suffers a house fire, she shows remarkable courage throughout, even saying that she had wanted to burn it down herself to make more room for her flowers. She is not prejudiced, though she talks caustically to Miss Stephanie Crawford, unlike many of her Southern neighbors, and teaches Scout important lessons about racism and human nature. Miss Maudie fully explains that "it is a sin to kill a mockingbird", whereas Atticus Finch initially brings up the subject but doesn't go into depth. When Jem gets older and doesn't want to be bothered by Scout, Miss Maudie keeps her from getting angry.

She is played by Rosemary Murphy in the film.

== Other characters ==
=== Francis Hancock ===
Francis Hancock is Aunt Alexandra's spoiled grandson, the son of her son Henry. Every Christmas, Henry and his wife drop Francis at Finch's Landing, which is the only time Scout and Jem see him. Francis lives in Mobile, Alabama, and is a bit of a tattle-tale. He gets along well with Jem, but often spars with Scout. One Christmas, Francis calls Atticus a "nigger-lover," as well as insisting that he was ruining the family, which infuriates Scout and causes them to get into a fight. Francis lies about his role in it, telling Uncle Jack that Scout started it by calling him a "whore lady", and Jack therefore punishes Scout. However, Scout later explains the full story and charitably persuades her uncle not to punish Francis about it, but to let Atticus think they had been fighting about something else.

=== Mrs. Henry Lafayette Dubose ===
Mrs. Henry Lafayette Dubose is an elderly woman who lives near the Finches. She is hated by the children, who run past her house to avoid her. Scout describes Mrs. Dubose as "plain hell." A virulent racist, she calls Atticus a "nigger-lover" to his children's faces, and Jem flies into a rage and ravages Mrs. Dubose's camellia bushes. As a punishment, Jem is required to read to Mrs. Dubose each day for a month. As Jem reads, she experiences fits of drooling and twitching and does not seem to pay any attention to the words. When an alarm clock rings, Jem is allowed to leave for the day. She sets the alarm for a slightly later time each day and extends the punishment for one week beyond the end of the original month. Shortly after Mrs. Dubose lets Jem go at the end of this extra week, Atticus brings word that she has died after a long and painful illness. Years earlier, her doctor had prescribed morphine as a painkiller, to which she soon became addicted. She decided that she wanted to break the addiction before she died, and used Jem's reading as a distraction to help her do so. In thanks, Mrs. Dubose sends him a candy box with a camellia flower in it; Jem burns the box in anger but is later seen by Scout admiring the flower. Atticus tells Jem that Mrs. Dubose was the bravest person he ever knew and that she was trying to teach Jem the importance of bravery and true courage to endure anything when the situation is hopeless, as in her morphine addiction.

=== Mr. Heck Tate ===
Mr. Hector "Heck" Tate, the sheriff of Maycomb County, is a friend of Atticus. At the end of the book, Atticus and Heck argue over whether Jem killed Ewell or Ewell killed himself. Heck, certain that Jem could not have killed Ewell but afraid Boo may have, eventually persuades Atticus to accept the theory that Ewell accidentally fell on his own knife. Heck thus saves the harmless, reclusive Boo from the public exposure of a criminal trial.

=== Mr. Braxton Underwood ===
Mr. Braxton Bragg Underwood, is a news reporter and a friend of Atticus. He owns and also publishes The Maycomb Tribune. Being a racist, he disagrees with Atticus on his views on race. He also has a strong belief in justice, as exemplified when he defends Atticus from the Cunningham mob by keeping a shotgun trained on them throughout the confrontation. He also demonstrates some humanity when he publishes a scathing editorial comparing the killing of Tom Robinson (a cripple) to "the senseless slaughter of songbirds by hunters and children."

=== Mr. Horace Gilmer ===
Mr. Horace Gilmer is a lawyer from Abbottsville, and is the prosecutor of the Tom Robinson trial. Mr. Gilmer is between the ages of forty and sixty. Mr. Gilmer has a slight cast with one eye, which he uses to his advantage in trial. Mr. Gilmer was extremely racist when he harshly cross examined Tom. He and Atticus are not rivals and talk to each other during recesses of the case.

=== Dr. Reynolds ===
Dr. Reynolds is the Maycomb doctor. He is well known to Scout and Jem. Scout says that he "had brought Jem and me into the world, had led us through every childhood disease known to man including the time Jem fell out of the tree house, and he had never lost our friendship. Dr. Reynolds said that if we were boil-prone things would have been different..."^{(ch. 28)} He attends to Jem's broken arm and Scout's minor bruises after the attack from Bob Ewell under the tree.

=== Mr. Dolphus Raymond ===
Mr. Dolphus Raymond is a white landowner who is jaded by the hypocrisy of white society and prefers to live among black folks, even having children with a black woman. Dolphus pretends he is an alcoholic so that the people of Maycomb will have an excuse for his behavior, but in fact, he only drinks Coca-Cola out of a paper bag to try to hide it. When Dill and Scout discover that he is not a drunk, they are amazed. He shows Scout how sometimes you can pretend to be someone else so people will be able to understand you better, demonstrating his social skills and intelligence.

=== Mr. Link Deas ===
Mr. Link Deas owns cotton fields and a store in Maycomb. He is Tom Robinson's employer and when he announces in court, that he had not "had a speck o' trouble outta him" in the eight years Tom had been working for him, he is sent out by Judge John Taylor for his outburst. When Bob Ewell starts threatening Helen, Tom Robinson's wife, after the trial, Mr. Deas fiercely defends her and threatens to have Ewell arrested if he keeps bothering her. Deas is on Tom Robinson's side throughout the trial and later he employs Helen.

=== Miss Caroline Fisher ===
Miss Caroline Fisher is the first-grade teacher and is new to Alabama and its ways. She attempts to teach the first-grade class using a new method that she took from a college course that Jem mistakenly refers to as the way library books are classified: the Dewey Decimal Classification. She is upset by Scout's advanced reading capabilities and believes that Scout is receiving lessons from Atticus. She feels as though Scout is trying to outsmart and mock her. In an effort to standardize the class, she forbids Scout from reading with her father. Atticus asks Scout to step into Miss Caroline's skin. However, he continues to allow Scout to read with him at night so long as she continues to go to school. Miss Caroline has good intentions but proves quite incompetent as a teacher. When Scout tells Miss Fisher that she shamed a student (Walter Cunningham Jr.) by giving him lunch money, she raps Scout's palms with a ruler (a punishment unheard of in Maycomb). She is also very sensitive and gets emotionally hurt quite easily, as seen when she cries after Burris Ewell yells at her, "Report and be damned to ye! Ain't no snot-nosed slut of a schoolteacher ever born c'n make me do nothin'! You ain't makin' me go nowhere, missus. You just remember that, you ain't makin' me go nowhere!" After the Burris Ewell incident, Miss Caroline is seldom seen and soon forgotten.

=== Reverend Sykes ===
Reverend Sykes is the reverend of the First Purchase M.E. African Church in Maycomb County, where most if not all of the African-American characters go to church. Reverend Sykes forces the congregation to donate 10 dollars for Tom Robinson's family since at the time, Tom's wife, Helen, was having trouble finding work. During the trial, when the courtroom was too packed for the children to find seats, Reverend Sykes lets the kids sit with him up in the colored balcony and even saves their seats for them.

=== Miss Stephanie Crawford ===
Miss Stephanie Crawford is known as the central source of gossip in Maycomb. Other than that, not much is known about her.

=== Miss Rachel Haverford ===
Miss Rachel Haverford is Dill's aunt and the Finches' next door neighbor. She drank neat whiskey heavily after seeing a rattlesnake coiled in her closet, on her washing, when she hung her negligee up. Even though she can be very hard to deal with, she truly does love her nephew. She is also a Southern Belle.

In the film, she is not present and Miss Stephanie takes her place as Dill's aunt.

=== Helen Robinson ===
Helen Robinson is married to Tom Robinson and the mother of their three children. Reverend Sykes raises 10 dollars for her from First Purchase Church. Employed by Link Deas following the death of her husband, she is repeatedly harassed by Bob Ewell when traveling to work. Upon learning of this, Deas threatens Ewell, forcing him to stop. She is an example of how one person's actions can have an effect on a lot of people and she elucidates the hardships that surround the Tom Robinson case. Also Mr Link Deas will defend her from Bob Ewell.

=== Mr. Nathan Radley ===
Mr. Nathan Radley is Arthur "Boo" Radley's brother. After discovering that Boo has been leaving small items in a tree knothole for Jem and Scout to find, he seals the hole with cement. He helps Miss Maudie when her house is on fire by running into her burning house and saving some of her belongings.

=== Jessie ===
Jessie is Mrs. Dubose's black nurse. She shoos the children out when Mrs. Dubose has her fits, and does seem to care enormously for Mrs. Dubose. When Jem is forced to read to Mrs. Dubose, Jessie kindly leads Jem and Scout to the door when Mrs. Dubose's alarm goes off.

=== Burris Ewell ===
Burris Ewell, a son of Bob Ewell, is belligerent like his father. He goes to the first day of school but departs as everyone else in his family has. Burris is indifferent to Caroline Fisher, his teacher. He behaves rudely when she tells him to go home, wash his hair to get rid of his head lice, and come back clean the next day. He refuses, and a student explains to Miss Caroline that the Ewell children never attend school; they only show up for the first day, get marked down on the register, then leave and remain absent until the next school year begins. As of Scout's first year of school (the first grade), Burris has repeated the first grade three times.

=== Lula ===
Lula is an African-American woman with a dislike for white people. She doesn't like the idea of Calpurnia bringing Atticus Finch's children, Jem and Scout, with her to church and tells her so but is overruled by the other congregants. According to Calpurnia's son Zeebo, Lula's said to be, "a troublemaker from way back, with fancy ideas and haughty ways." She's threatened with being "churched" (subjected to church discipline) by Reverend Sykes.

=== Mrs. Grace Merriweather ===
Mrs. Grace Merriweather is the producer of the play in which Scout plays as a ham. She recounts how she told the missionary, J. Grimes Everett, that "the ladies of the Maycomb Alabama Methodist Episcopal Church South are behind you one hundred percent." She is mostly known for her devotion to the church and is widely held as the most devout lady in Maycomb; however, like many of her peers, she is very hypocritical and loves to gossip with all the other women.

=== Walter Cunningham Jr. ===
Walter Cunningham Jr. is a child who is almost as old as Jem but is in Scout's class. He lives on a farm. He is too poor to even pay off a 25-cent debt because the Great Depression hit his poor family hard. He doesn't take money because his family can't pay people back in cash. His father paid Atticus for his service for something a while back with some goods. Walter is invited over to the Finches' house once, after engaging in a fight with Scout, where he covers up all of his dinner with molasses, much to Scout's vocal dismay. This teaches Scout a lesson in humility and compassion.

=== Walter Cunningham Sr. ===
Walter Cunningham Sr. is Walter Cunningham Jr.'s father. He appears only twice, once at the beginning of the story when he pays off his debt to Atticus (Cunningham Sr. had been a client) by giving him firewood, vegetables, and other supplies. His second appearance is later on when he leads the mob that comes to lynch Tom Robinson the night before the trial. Only when Scout talks to him about how she knows Walter Jr, and how much he personally owes Atticus for what the lawyer has done for him does he reconsider, disbands the lynch mob and sends the participants home. After the verdict is given in the trial, Atticus tells Jem that one of the Cunninghams had changed his thoughts about Tom and pleaded that Tom was not guilty to the jury. Walter Cunningham Sr. is a poor but honorable man, and after his interaction with Scout, he realizes it is not right to hurt people during this interaction

=== Little Chuck Little ===
Little Chuck Little is a student in Scout's first-grade class who has the mindset of an adult. His real name is Charles. He is depicted as chiefly antagonistic of Burris Ewell. He appears in the novel when Miss Caroline is frightened by Burris' lice. He warned Miss Caroline that if Burris wasn't released from class, he might try something that would put their classmates at risk. When Burris starts advancing on Little Chuck after his warning/veiled insult, Little Chuck's hand moved to his pocket (implying that he was going to pull out a knife) while saying, "Watch your step, Burris. I'd soon's kill you as look at you. Now go home." Scared by Little Chuck's bravery and his implied knife, Burris retreats. We see through the narrative view of Scout his gentlemanly attitude, and how it calms Miss Caroline down. Little Chuck could be even more intelligent than originally meets the eye, as he easily could have been bluffing about the aforementioned implied knife to scare Burris into retreating.

=== Mr. Avery ===
The overweight Mr. Avery boards across the street from Mrs. Dubose's house. He tells Jem and Scout that dramatic changes in the weather are caused by disobedient and misbehaving children. Jem, Scout and Dill watched Avery urinating from his front porch in an impressive arc. After it snows, they build a snowman to resemble him. Atticus disapproved of the snowman, so the children made it look like Miss Maudie instead. Mr. Avery pushes a mattress out of the window when Miss Maudie's house catches fire.

=== Miss Gates ===
Miss Gates is a teacher at Scout's school who insists that America isn't prejudiced like Hitler's Germany. Despite this, Scout has heard her say that the blacks need to be taught a lesson after Tom's trial. Her dual nature of hating Hitler and his prejudice while simultaneously being prejudiced against African Americans in her own community illustrates the hypocrisy present in Maycomb.

=== Eula May ===
Eula May is Maycomb's most prominent telephone operator. She sends out public announcements, invitations, and activates the fire alarm. She announced the closing of schools when it snowed and announced the rabid dog that entered Maycomb. Her job allows her to know everybody in town.

=== Cecil Jacobs ===
Cecil Jacobs teases Scout and Jem at school. Scout almost gets into a fight with Cecil over the trial of Tom Robinson. Scout confronts Cecil Jacobs because he says Atticus is a "Nigger Lover." He gives a current event presentation on Adolf Hitler and later frightens Scout and Jem on their way to the Halloween pageant. He and Scout then pair up at the carnival. He hints that black people are not as good as white people while talking about Hitler during current events.

=== Tim Johnson ===
Tim Johnson is a dog belonging to Harry Johnson (a character in the book who is mentioned once but is never seen). He is infected by rabies in chapter 10 and goes mad, putting everyone in the town at risk. Atticus is forced to shoot Tim Johnson, preventing him from infecting anyone, and revealing his excellent marksmanship (his nickname used to be One-Shot Finch). The dog's body is collected by Zeebo.

=== Simon Finch ===
Simon Finch is the founder of Finch's Landing. He is referred to in the first chapter of the book, being a direct ancestor of Atticus. He is a Cornish Methodist and emigrated from England to avoid religious persecution, landing in Philadelphia before settling in Alabama. He was married, with one son, eight daughters. He is also an apothecary.

=== Maxwell Green ===
Maxwell Green is the new lawyer in town. He is normally the judicially-assigned defense attorney but Judge Taylor assigned Tom Robinson's case to Atticus to give Tom Robinson a better chance.

=== Mr. X Billups ===
Mr. X Billups who is seen only once in the book, going to the trial, is described as a "funny man." X is his name, and not his initial. He was asked repeated times what his name was until he signed it. X was the name he had been given when he was born because his parents marked his birth certificate with an X instead of a name.

=== The Barber Sisters (Miss "Tutti" and Miss "Frutti") ===
The Barber Sisters (Miss Sarah, nicknamed "Tutti" and Miss Frances, nicknamed "Frutti") are maiden sisters who live in the only house in Maycomb with a cellar. They were originally from Clanton, Alabama, and are rumored to be Republicans. Besides their Yankee ways, both sisters are deaf (Tutti completely deaf; Frutti uses an ear trumpet) and had a Halloween prank pulled on them by some "wicked" schoolchildren (Scout claims she was not included) who put all of their furniture in their cellar.

=== Mrs. Gertrude Farrow ===
Mrs. Farrow is a lady in the missionary society who visits the Finch house occasionally.

=== Mr. Conner ===
Mr. Conner is mentioned early on in the book. He was locked in an outhouse by "Boo" Radley and his friends. After taking the teenagers to court, Mr. Conner accused them of "disorderly conduct, disturbing the peace, assault, and battery, and using abusive and profane language in the presence and hearing of a female." He added the last charge after claiming that the teens had "cussed so loud he was sure every lady in Maycomb heard them."

=== Zeebo ===
Calpurnia taught her son, Zeebo, how to read. Zeebo is one of just four people in First Purchase Church who can read, so he is the vocal leader, leading hymns in their church by "lining"—reading a line of verse and having the congregation sing it. He is the garbage man who took away the dead rabid dog, Tim Johnson. When Lula, a fellow church member, tries to make Scout and Jem feel bad for attending church with Calpurnia, Zeebo welcomes them with open arms.
