= Ralph Voss =

English cricketer

Personal information
- Full name: Ralph Voss
- Born: 30 March 1860; Croydon, London, England
- Died: 16 November 1900 (aged 40); Croydon, London, England
- Batting: Right-handed
- Bowling: Unknown

Domestic team information
- Years: Team
- 1883–1886: Surrey

Career statistics
Competition	First-class
Matches	3
Runs scored	10
Batting average	3.33
100s/50s	–/–
Top score	7
Balls bowled	124
Wickets	2
Bowling average	26.50
5 wickets in innings	–
10 wickets in match	–
Best bowling	2/31
Catches/stumpings	–/–
- Source: Cricinfo, 23 June 2012

Ralph Voss (30 March 1860 – 16 November 1900) was an English cricketer. Voss was a right-handed batsman, although his bowling style is unknown. He was born at Croydon, London.

Voss made three first-class appearances for Surrey, the first of which came against Nottinghamshire at Trent Bridge in 1883. His second appearance came against Derbyshire in the same year at the County Ground, Derby, while his third appearance came in 1886 against Cambridge University at The Oval. He scored 10 runs in his three matches, at an average of 3.33 and a high score of 7. With the ball, he took 2 wickets at a bowling average of 26.50, with best figures of 2/31. He later stood as an umpire in a first-class match between Surrey and Oxford University in 1888.

He died at the town of his birth on 16 November 1900.
