= Claudia Durst Johnson =

Literary scholar

Claudia Durst Johnson is a literary scholar best known for her work on the novel To Kill a Mockingbird, introducing the idea of the novel's gothicism and gothic satire. In the process of her research she befriended the author, Harper Lee. When the city of Chicago organized a One City One Book program in 2001 based on To Kill a Mockingbird, Lee was unavailable to speak, so Johnson was invited to Chicago to present the book to the city.

Johnson, a native of North Carolina, earned a PhD in Literature at the University of Illinois Urbana-Champaign in 1973. She is the author of nine books covering a wide range of subjects, including To Kill a Mockingbird: Threatening Boundaries (1994) and Church and Stage: The Theatre As Target of Religious Condemnation in Nineteenth Century America (2007). As a theater historian, she brought to light the scandalous “third tier” in 19th century American stage productions, an upper balcony in many theaters reserved exclusively for prostitutes. She is a professor emeritus of English Literature at the University of Alabama, where she taught for two decades and served as chair of the English Department for twelve years until her retirement in 1996. She lives in Berkeley, California, where she continues to write, edit, and lecture.

== Bibliography ==
- The Productive Tension of Hawthorne's Art, University of Alabama Press, 1981; republished in 2016.
- American Actress: Perspective on the Nineteenth Century, Nelson-Hall, 1984, republished in 2014
- To Kill a Mockingbird: Threatening Boundaries, Simon and Schuster. 1994.
- Daily Life in Colonial New England, Greenwood Press, 2002.
- The Social Impact of the Novel, with co-author Vernon Johnson, Greenwood Press, 2002,
- Gangs in Literature, Greenwood-Heinemann, 2004.
- Church and Stage: The Theatre As Target of Religious Condemnation in Nineteenth Century America, McFarland Press, 2007
- The Bard Debunked, 2014, a republication of the book originally titled Annotated Biography of Shakespeare: Parody and Travesty, co-authored with Henry Jacobs. Garland publishers, 1976.

Johnson also wrote a series of 10 educational books published by Greenwood Press (1994-2002), including:

- Understanding To Kill a Mockingbird: Contexts and Issues. (1994)
- Understanding The Scarlet Letter: Context and Issues (1995)
- Understanding The Adventures of Huckleberry Finn (1996)

== Selected articles ==
"Hawthorne and Nineteenth-Century Perfectionism," American Literature, December, 1972. Reprinted in On Hawthorne. The Best From American Literature, Duke University. Press, 1990. "Justification and 'Young Goodman Brown," Studies in Short Fiction, Spring, 974. "That Guilty Third Tier: Prostitution in the Nineteenth-Century in Victorian America, ed. Daniel Howe, University of Pennsylvania Press, 1976. "The Obsession of Elbridge T. Gerry," Nineteenth-Century Theatre Research, 1985. "Impotence and Omnipotence in The Scarlet Letter," New England Quarterly, December, 1993. "Discord in Concord: Louisa May Alcott and Nathaniel Hawthorne," in Hawthorne and the Women of His Day. University of Massachusetts Press, 1999

== Awards ==
- Burlington Northern Award for Outstanding Scholarship, 1986. An annual award founded by the Burlington Northern Foundation for general excellence in research.
- Outstanding Academic Book Citation for American Actress, (1984) given by the journal Choice, designed for and subscribed to by colleges and university libraries in the United States.
- University Distinguished Service Award 1993 (one of 4 given in previous 15 years) Presented by the University of Alabama Faculty Senate for her faculty advocacy.
- Eugene-Current Garcia Award for Outstanding Scholarship, May, 1998. First winner of this award for Distinction in Literary Scholarship by a writer on Southern literature.
