= 1831 Maryland gubernatorial election =

- January 3, 1831
Nominee	Daniel Martin
Party	National Republican
Popular vote	52
Percentage	61.90%
Governor before election
Thomas King Carroll
Democratic
Elected Governor
Daniel Martin
National Republican

The 1831 Maryland gubernatorial election was held on January 3, 1831, in order to elect the governor of Maryland. Former National Republican governor Daniel Martin was elected by the Maryland General Assembly against incumbent Democratic governor Thomas King Carroll in a rematch of the previous election.

== General election ==
On election day, January 3, 1831, former National Republican governor Daniel Martin was elected by the Maryland General Assembly, thereby gaining National Republican control over the office of governor. Martin was sworn in for his second non-consecutive term on January 13, 1831.

=== Results ===
Maryland gubernatorial election, 1831
Party	Candidate	Votes	%
National Republican	Daniel Martin	52	61.90
	Did Not Vote	32	38.10
Democratic	Thomas King Carroll (incumbent)	0	0.00
Total votes		84	100.00
National Republican gain from Democratic			
