= Maryland Route 333 =

State highway in Maryland, United States

Maryland Route 333
- Maryland Route 333 highlighted in red

Route information
- Maintained by MDSHA
- Length: 9.79 mi (15.76 km)
- Existed: 1927–present
- Tourist routes: Chesapeake Country Scenic Byway

Major junctions
- South end: Oxford–Bellevue Ferry terminal in Oxford
- MD 322 in Easton
- North end: Washington Street in Easton

Location
- Country: United States
- State: Maryland
- Counties: Talbot

Highway system
- Maryland highway system; Interstate; US; State; Scenic Byways
← MD 332	→ MD 334

Maryland Route 333 (MD 333) is a state highway in the U.S. state of Maryland. The state highway runs 9.79 miles (15.76 km) from the terminal of the seasonal Oxford–Bellevue Ferry in Oxford north to Washington Street in Easton within southwestern Talbot County. MD 333 was constructed between Trippe Creek and Easton in the 1910s. The highway was extended to Oxford in the late 1920s. In Easton, MD 333 was assigned to the southern part of Washington Street between 1948 and 1959 after U.S. Route 213 (US 213, later US 50) bypassed the town.

== Route description ==
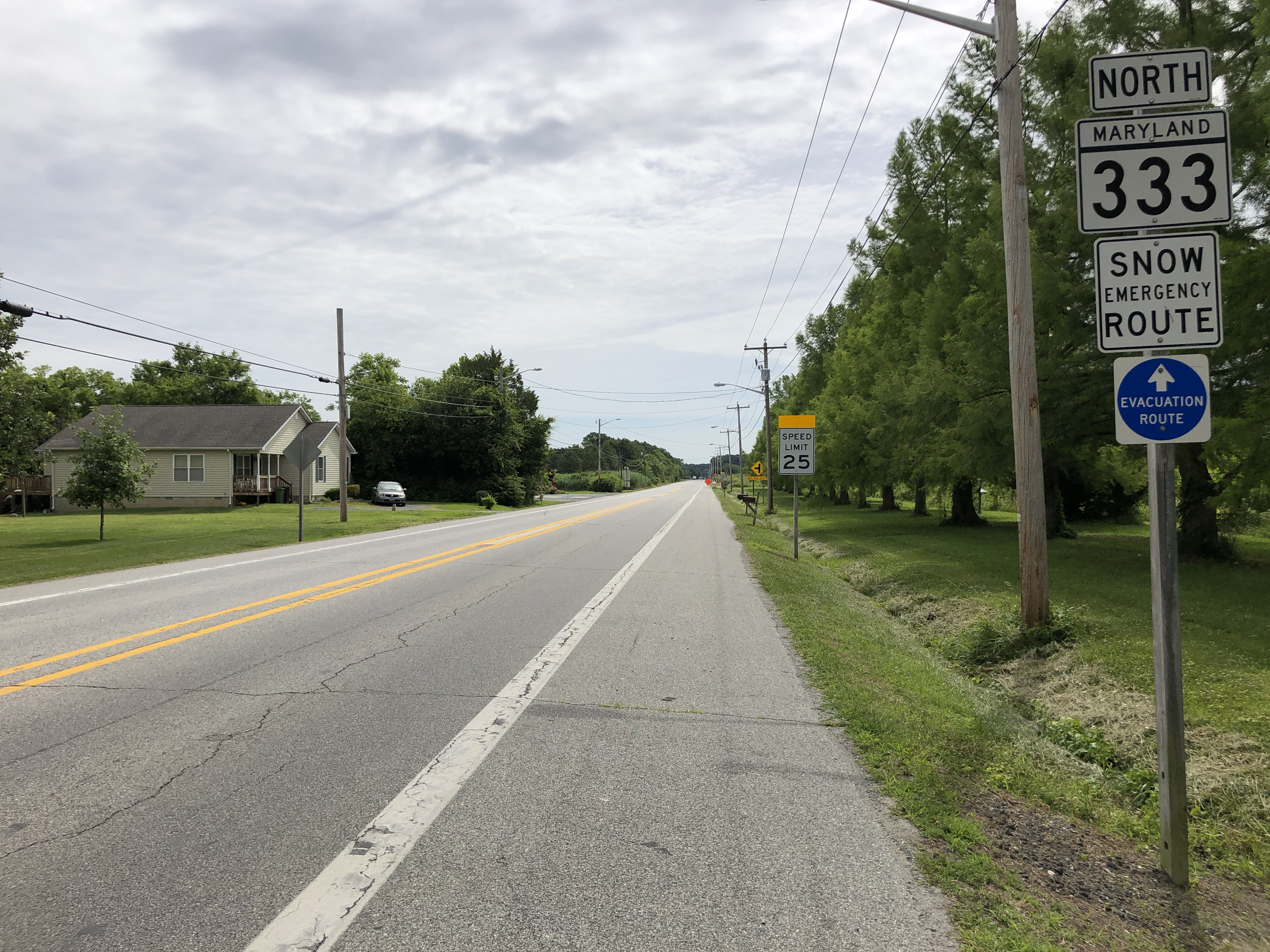
MD 333 northbound in Oxford

MD 333 begins at the Oxford terminal of the seasonal Oxford–Bellevue Ferry across the Tred Avon River to Bellevue. The state highway heads southeast through the town as two-lane undivided Morris Street. At the southern end of the town at the head of a branch of Town Creek, Morris Street continues straight as a municipal street while MD 333 curves to the east and leaves the town via Oxford Road. The state highway heads east through farmland, beginning a curve to the northeast shortly before Almshouse Road. MD 333 begins to pass residential subdivisions and golf courses as the highway turns north and crosses Trippe Creek and Peach Blossom Creek. North of the latter creek, the state highway enters the town of Easton, then crosses Paper Mill Pond before intersecting MD 322 (Easton Parkway). MD 333 continues northeast as Peach Blossom Road to the southeast of Easton Middle School to its northern terminus at a five-way intersection with Washington Street, Harrison Street, and Idlewild Avenue.

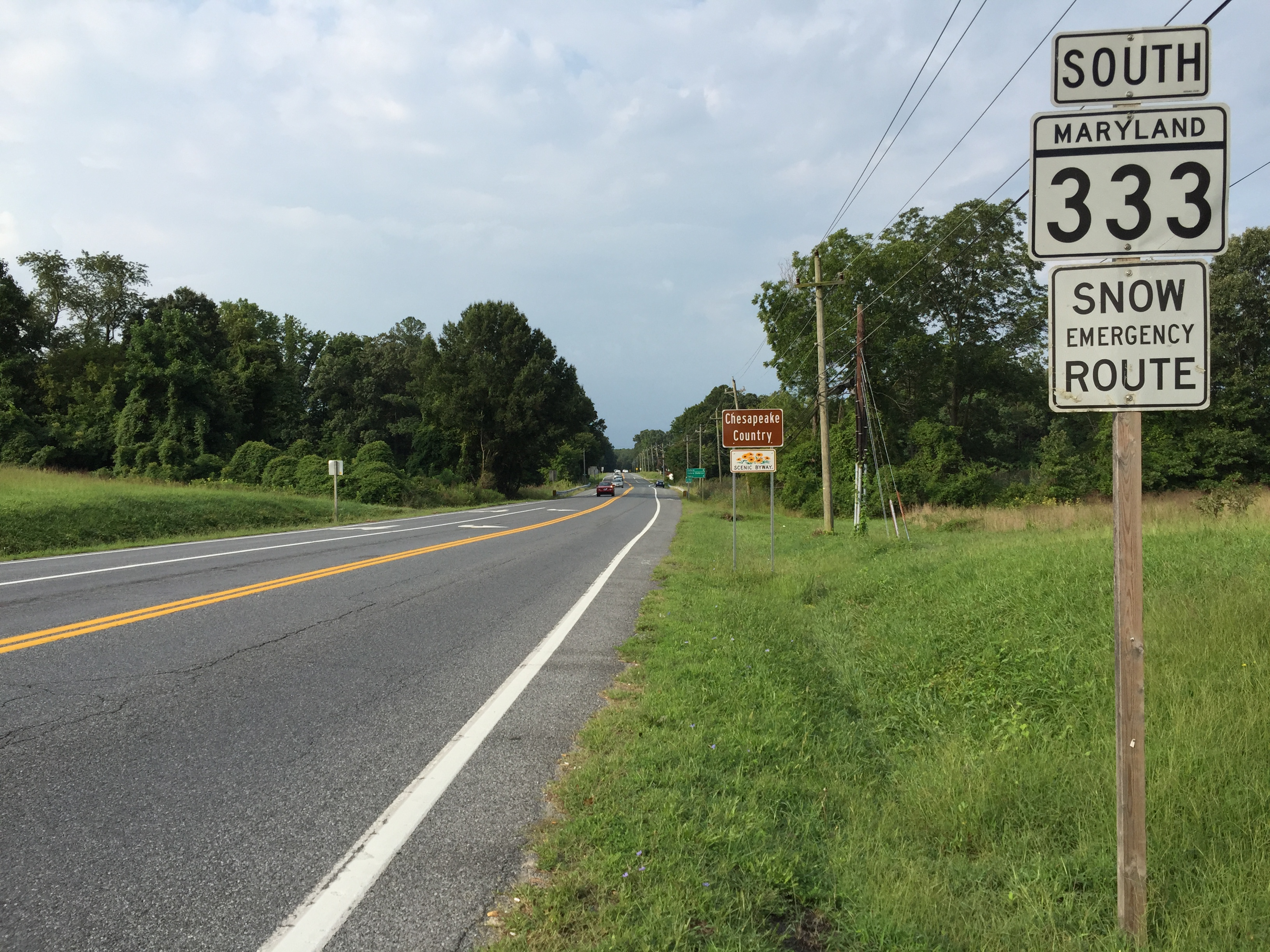
View south along MD 333 at MD 322 in Easton

MD 333 is a part of the National Highway System as a principal arterial from Peach Blossom Creek to MD 322 in Easton.

== History ==
The first section of MD 333 was constructed as a state-aid road between Trippe Creek and Peach Blossom Creek in 1913. The state-aid work included bridges over both creeks. The highway was extended as another state-aid project north from Peach Blossom Creek to Easton by 1919. MD 333 was reconstructed as a state highway beginning in 1925. The highway north of Peach Blossom Creek and the portion between Almshouse Road and Trippe Creek were paved or repaved by 1927. MD 333 was completed when the highway was finished between Oxford and Almshouse Road by 1930. At the Easton end, MD 333 was extended south on Washington Street to the new eastern bypass of Easton in 1948 when the town was bypassed by US 213, which became US 50 in 1949. MD 333's northern terminus was returned to Washington Street when MD 565 was assigned to Washington Street in 1958. The bridges over Peach Blossom Creek and Trippe Creek were replaced in 1997 and 1998, respectively.

== Junction list ==
The entire route is in Talbot County.

Location	mi	km	Destinations	Notes
Oxford	0.00	0.00	Oxford–Bellevue Ferry terminal – Bellevue	Southern terminus
Easton	9.41	15.14	MD 322 (Easton Parkway) to US 50 – Cambridge, Bay Bridge	
Easton	9.79	15.76	Washington Street / Harrison Street north / Idlewild Avenue east	Northern terminus
1.000 mi = 1.609 km; 1.000 km = 0.621 mi
