= Governor Carroll =

Governor Carroll may refer to:

- Beryl F. Carroll (1860–1939), 20th Governor of Iowa
- John Lee Carroll (1830–1911), 37th Governor of Maryland
- Julian Carroll (born 1931), 54th Governor of Kentucky
- Thomas King Carroll (1793–1873), 21st Governor of Maryland
- William Carroll (Tennessee politician) (1788–1844), 5th Governor of Tennessee
