= Mary Dixon =

Mary Dixon may refer to:

- Mary Bartlett Dixon (1873–1957), American nurse and suffragist
- Mary J. Scarlett Dixon (1822–1900), American physician and abolitionist
- Mary Dixon (murder victim) (?–1886), English victim of serial killer Mary Ann Britland
- Mary Dixon Kies (1752–1837), née Dixon, American inventor
- Mary Dixon-Woods, Irish social scientist and professor
