= 1830 Maryland gubernatorial election =

1830 Maryland gubernatorial race. Thomas King Carroll (D) beats Daniel Martin (R)

- January 4, 1830
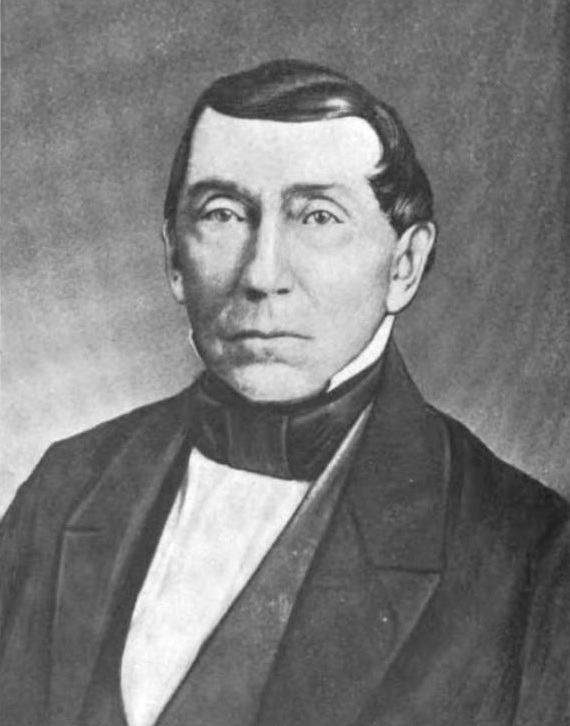

Nominee	Thomas King Carroll	Daniel Martin
Party	Democratic	National Republican
Popular vote	50	43
Percentage	53.76%	46.24%
Governor before election
Daniel Martin
National Republican
Elected Governor
Thomas King Carroll
Democratic

The 1830 Maryland gubernatorial election was held on January 4, 1830, in order to elect the governor of Maryland. Democratic nominee and former member of the Maryland House of Delegates Thomas King Carroll was elected by the Maryland General Assembly against incumbent National Republican governor Daniel Martin.

== General election ==
On election day, January 4, 1830, Democratic nominee Thomas King Carroll was elected by the Maryland General Assembly, thereby gaining Democratic control over the office of governor. Carroll was sworn in as the 21st governor of Maryland on January 15, 1830.

=== Results ===
Maryland gubernatorial election, 1830
Party	Candidate	Votes	%
Democratic	Thomas King Carroll	50	53.76
National Republican	Daniel Martin	43	46.24
Total votes		93	100.00
Democratic gain from National Republican			
