= Wye Town Farm House =

Historic house in Maryland, US

- U.S. National Register of Historic Places
- Location within Maryland Location within the United States
- Location: Bruffs Island Road, Easton, Maryland
- Coordinates: 38°50′31″N 76°11′18″W
- Area: 7.5 acres (3.0 ha)
- Built: c. 1800
- NRHP reference No.: 82001600
- Added to NRHP: December 16, 1982

The Wye Town Farm House is a historic home in Easton, Talbot County, Maryland, United States. It is of brick construction, one and one-half stories high and two rooms deep with a small one-story brick kitchen. A two-story addition was made in the 20th century. The original section of the house dates from about 1800.

The Wye Town Farm House was listed on the National Register of Historic Places in 1982.
