= Troth's Fortune =

Historic house in Maryland, United States

- U.S. National Register of Historic Places
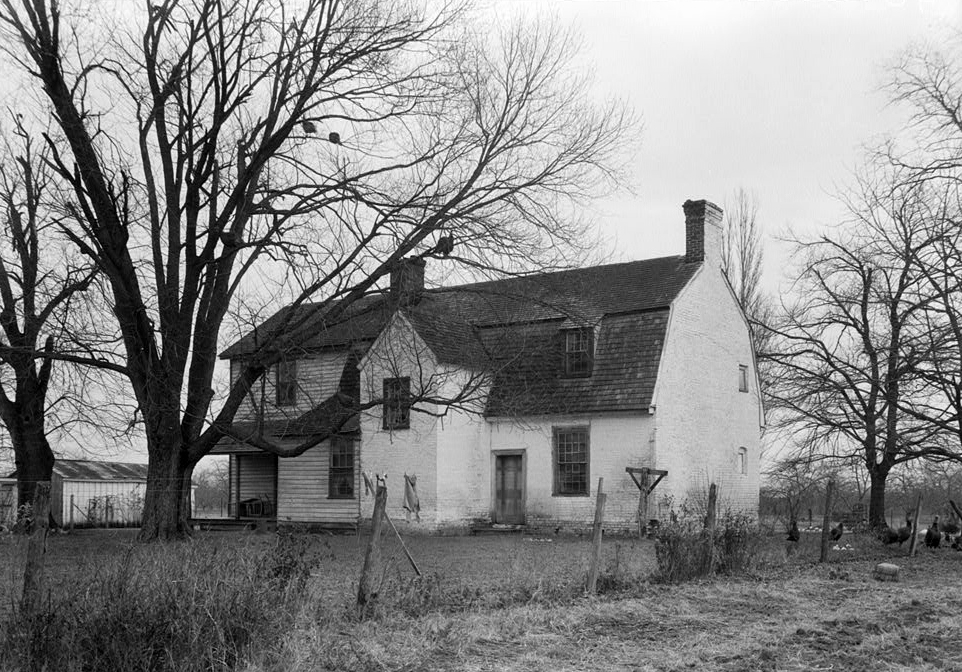

- Location within Maryland Location within the United States
- Location: 30776 Triple Farm Way, Easton, Maryland
- Coordinates: 38°45′49″N 75°59′41″W
- Area: 33 acres (13 ha)
- Built: c. 1686-1710
- NRHP reference No.: 75000921
- Added to NRHP: April 24, 1975

Troth's Fortune, also known as Troth's Farm, is a historic home in Easton, Talbot County, Maryland, United States. It is a 1 1/2-story, two-room deep, gambrel-roofed dwelling with a medieval style stair tower and a richly detailed interior. The house has two 20th-century frame wings. It was probably built between the years 1686 and 1710, and is a well-preserved example of late 17th-century Maryland vernacular architecture.

Troth's Fortune was listed on the National Register of Historic Places in 1975.
