= Doncaster Town Site =

- U.S. National Register of Historic Places
- Location within Maryland Location within the United States
- Location: Bruffs Island Rd., on the shores of Shaw Bay, Easton, Maryland
- Coordinates: 38°51′30″N 76°11′27″W
- Area: 65 acres (26 ha)
- NRHP reference No.: 75000920
- Added to NRHP: September 05, 1975

The Doncaster Town Site is an archeological site near Easton, Talbot County, Maryland. The site is located on one of the earliest land grants in Talbot County, surveyed on October 18, 1658. It is the location of the first Roman Catholic Church erected on the Eastern Shore of Maryland. The town was erected in 1684 and was one of the first planned towns in Maryland. At its peak Doncaster would have contained inns, a chapel, warehouses, a ferry, stores, stocks and a whipping post, a public square, and a number of residences. Archeological deposits were recorded in 1961.

It was listed on the National Register of Historic Places in 1975.
