= Maryland Route 322 =

Highway in Maryland

Maryland Route 322
- Easton Parkway
- Map of central Talbot County, Maryland with MD 322 highlighted in red

Route information
- Maintained by MDSHA
- Length: 5.12 mi (8.24 km)
- Existed: 1965–present
- Tourist routes: Chesapeake Country Scenic Byway

Major junctions
- South end: US 50 south of Easton
- MD 565 in Easton; MD 333 in Easton; MD 334 in Easton; MD 33 in Easton
- North end: US 50 north of Easton

Location
- Country: United States
- State: Maryland
- Counties: Talbot

Highway system
- Maryland highway system; Interstate; US; State; Scenic Byways
← MD 320	→ MD 324

Maryland Route 322 (MD 322) is a state highway in the U.S. state of Maryland. Known as Easton Parkway, the highway runs 5.12 miles (8.24 km) on the west side of Easton between two junctions with U.S. Route 50 (US 50). MD 322 serves as a bypass of downtown Easton for traffic between US 50 and highways to western Talbot County, including MD 33 toward Saint Michaels and Tilghman Island and MD 333 toward Oxford. Easton Parkway was constructed in the mid to late 1960s. The state highway was originally designated as part of MD 33; MD 322 became the sole designation on the bypass in 1978.

== Route description ==
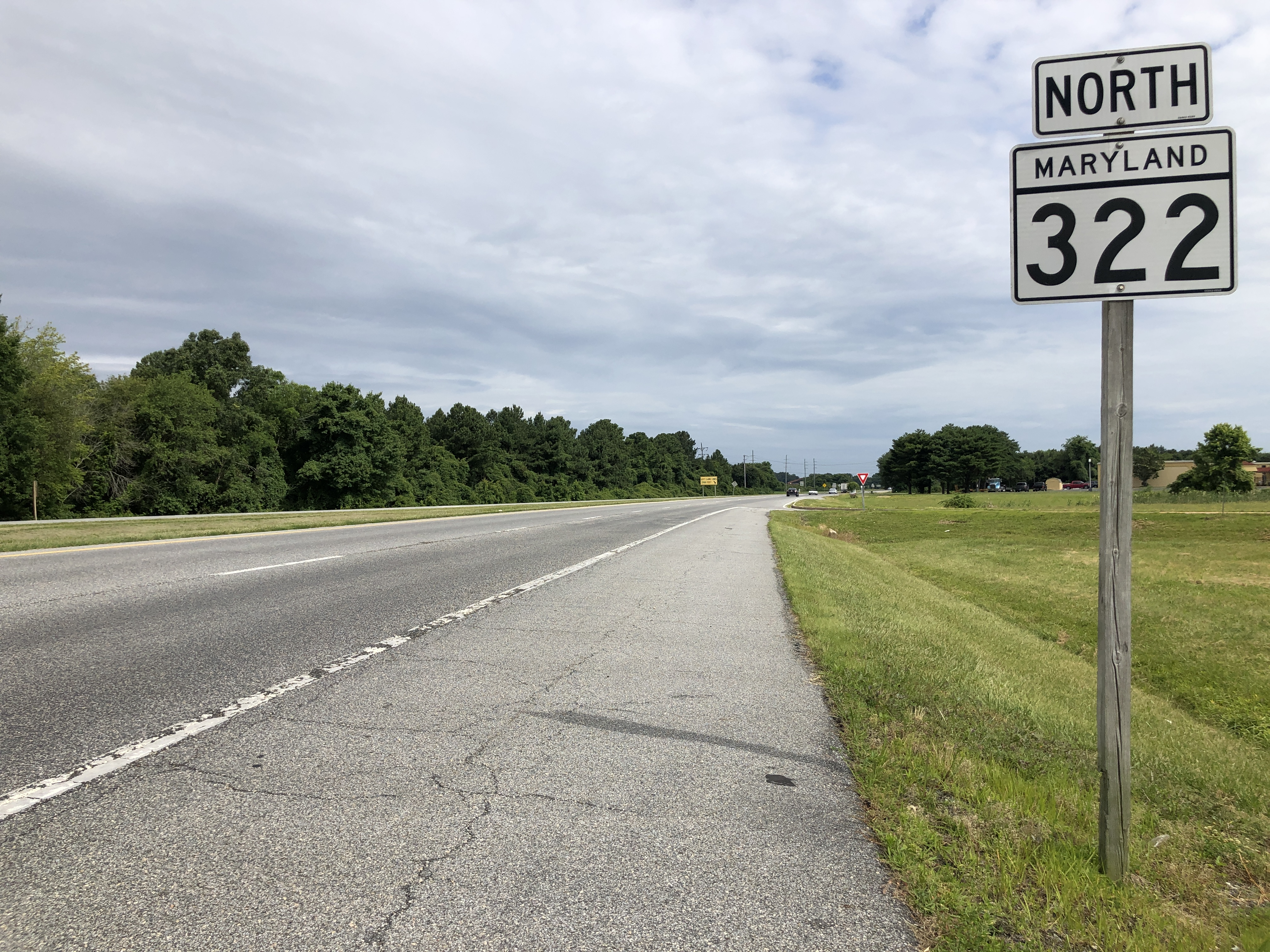
MD 322 northbound past US 50 south of Easton

MD 322 begins at a directional intersection with US 50 (Ocean Gateway) south of Easton; there is no direct access from southbound MD 322 to westbound US 50. MD 322 heads north as a four-lane divided highway to MD 565 (Washington Street). Beyond this intersection, the state highway reduces to a two-lane undivided road, curves to the northwest, and crosses Paper Mill Pond. MD 322 parallels the pond through the highway's intersection with MD 333, which heads southwest as Oxford Road and northeast as Peach Blossom Road. After the pond turns west, the state highway intersects Port Street, which heads east toward downtown Easton as MD 334 and west as a county highway into the Easton Point industrial area.

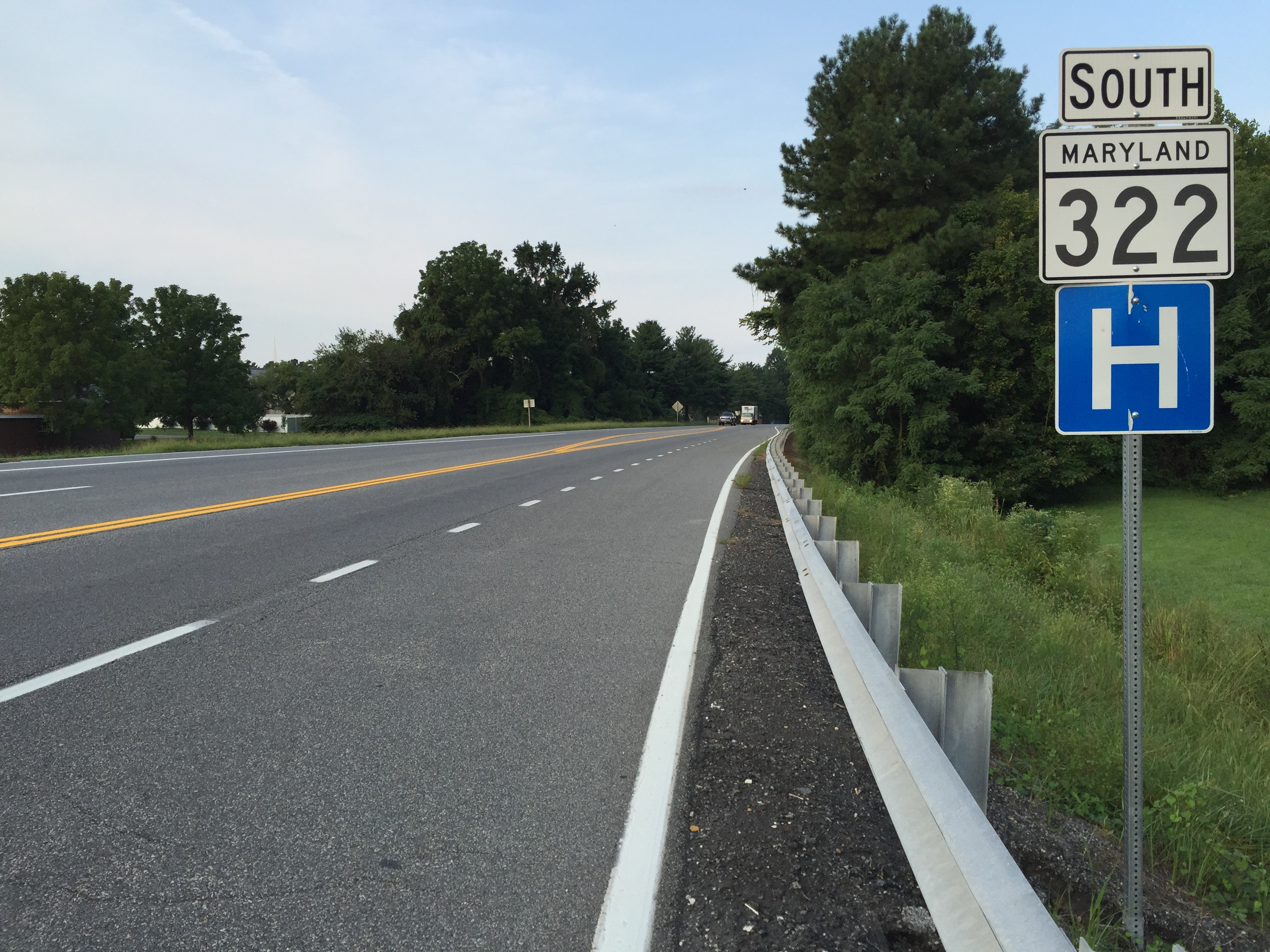
View south along MD 322 at Washington Street in Easton

MD 322 temporarily expands to a four-lane undivided highway at its intersection with MD 33, which heads east as Bay Street toward downtown Easton and west as St. Michaels Road. The MD 322–MD 33 intersection lies on a crossing of Tanyard Creek just east of its confluence with an unnamed creek to form the North Fork of the Tred Avon River. MD 322 continues northeast past several shopping centers and industrial parks between MD 33 and Glebe Road. Near its northern terminus, the state highway meets the northern end of Washington Street and Airpark Drive, which immediately has an intersection with MD 662 (Centreville Road) before entering an industrial park adjacent to Easton Airport. MD 322 reaches its northern terminus at a directional intersection with US 50.

MD 322 is a part of the National Highway System as a principal arterial for its entire length.

== History ==
Easton Parkway was constructed as a way for traffic from Oxford and Saint Michaels to access points north and south via US 50 without having to travel through downtown Easton. The first section of the state highway was completed in 1965 from the present intersection with MD 33 north to US 50. MD 33 was removed from Bay Street and Washington Street north of downtown Easton and placed on the first section of Easton Parkway. The highway was extended south to MD 333 in 1966. The remainder of the highway south to US 50 was completed in 1970. The MD 322 designation was originally applied to the southern part of the parkway as well as Bay Street. MD 33 and MD 322 were reassigned to their present lengths of highway in 1978.

== Junction list ==
The entire route is in Easton, Talbot County.

mi	km	Destinations	Notes
0.00	0.00	US 50 east (Ocean Gateway) – Cambridge	Southern terminus; no access from southbound MD 322 to westbound US 50
0.53	0.85	MD 565 north (Washington Street) – Easton	Southern terminus of MD 565; officially MD 565A
1.59	2.56	MD 333 (Oxford Road/Peach Blossom Road) – Oxford, Oxford–Bellevue Ferry	
2.41	3.88	MD 334 east (Port Street) / Port Street west	Western terminus of MD 334
2.98	4.80	MD 33 (St. Michaels Road/Bay Street) – St. Michaels, Tilghman Island, Easton Historic District	
4.64	7.47	Airpark Drive west to MD 662 north (Centreville Road) / Washington Street south	Airpark Drive is officially MD 322B
5.12	8.24	US 50 (Ocean Gateway) – Bay Bridge	Northern terminus
1.000 mi = 1.609 km; 1.000 km = 0.621 mi: Incomplete access

== Auxiliary routes ==
- MD 322A is the designation for the unnamed 0.07-mile (0.11 km) ramp from eastbound US 50 to northbound MD 322 south of Easton.
- MD 322B is the designation for the 0.03-mile (0.048 km) section of Airpark Drive between MD 322 and MD 662 north of Easton.
