= Myrtle Grove (Easton, Maryland) =

Historic house in Maryland, US

- U.S. National Register of Historic Places
- Location within Maryland Location within the United States
- Location: Goldsborough Neck Rd., Easton, Maryland
- Coordinates: 38°48′15″N 76°7′6″W
- Area: 40 acres (16 ha)
- Built: 1790
- NRHP reference No.: 74000967
- Added to NRHP: August 13, 1974

Myrtle Grove is a historic home in Easton, Talbot County, Maryland. It consists of a frame section dating from the first half of the 18th century, a 1790 Flemish bond brick section, and a 1927 frame wing. The oldest section is five bays wide and one and a half stories tall on a brick foundation laid in English bond.

It was listed on the National Register of Historic Places in 1974.
