= John A. Moaney =

Valet to US President Eisenhower (1914–1978)

John A. Moaney Jr. (1914–1978) was an American soldier and valet to President Dwight D. Eisenhower. Moaney was born in Easton, Maryland. He joined the United States Army in October 1941 and was sent to England after the start of World War II, where he served with the 751 Quartermaster Company. In August 1942, when Eisenhower was in England to plan the invasion of North Africa, Moaney transferred to Eisenhower's personal staff. For the next 27 years Moaney served as Eisenhower's valet.

Moaney accompanied Eisenhower throughout the remainder of World War II and was stationed at the White House during Eisenhower's presidency, including dressing him inside to out every day. After Eisenhower left the White House in 1961, Moaney went with him to his farm in Gettysburg, Pennsylvania (now the Eisenhower National Historic Site). Moaney was one of the honorary pallbearers at Eisenhower's funeral services in Washington, D.C., and Abilene, Kansas. Moaney retired from the Army in 1969 after the former president's death, but continued to work for Mamie Eisenhower until his death in 1978.
