= The Wilderness (Trappe, Maryland) =

Historic house in Maryland, US

- U.S. National Register of Historic Places
- Location within Maryland Location within the United States
- Location: Island Creek Road, Trappe, Maryland
- Coordinates: 38°38′22″N 76°8′12″W
- Area: 65 acres (26 ha)
- Built: 1785
- Architectural style: Federal
- NRHP reference No.: 74000971
- Added to NRHP: July 25, 1974

The Wilderness, or High Banks, is a historic home at Matthews, Talbot County, Maryland, United States. It overlooks the Choptank River and was constructed in two periods. The smaller 2 1/2-story, four-bay-long brick structure is attributed to the 1780-90 period, and the larger portion is in Flemish bond brick and dates to around 1815. Also on the property are two early outbuildings, a smokehouse, and dairy. It was the home of Daniel Martin, the 20th Governor of Maryland.

The Wilderness was listed on the National Register of Historic Places in 1974.
