= Ruth Cox Adams =

American abolitionist

- Born: Ruth Cox c. 1818; Easton, Maryland, U.S.
- Died: April 22, 1900; Lincoln, Nebraska, U.S.
- Burial place: Wyuka Cemetery, Lincoln, Nebraska, U.S.
- Other name: Harriet Bailey

Ruth Cox Adams (c. 1818 – April 22, 1900) was an American abolitionist and former slave.

== Early life and escape from slavery ==
Ruth Cox was born in 1818 to an enslaved woman named Ebby Cox, who was held on the plantation of John Leeds Kerr in Easton, Maryland, and a free black man. Ruth worked as a nurse and a caretaker of children while she was enslaved. Accounts differ on whether Cox escaped slavery in 1842 or in 1844, following Kerr's death and the knowledge she would be sold. In either case, she was 24 at the time, according to her granddaughter, and traveled through Pennsylvania to New York with a group of young mothers and their children.

== Adult life ==
She lived with Frederick and Anna Douglass in Lynn, Massachusetts, from 1842 or 1844 until 1847. Some accounts say that Douglass and Cox first met at an antislavery meeting in West Chester, Pennsylvania, in August 1844, as Cox was fleeing north. While living with them, Cox went by the pseudonym Harriet Bailey, the name of Frederick Douglass's deceased mother and lost younger sister, to avoid the attention of slave catchers. Both Ruth and Douglass originated from the same region of Maryland, and after finding out that Cox had a brother named Leon Bailey, Douglass considered Cox as his sister. Anna and Cox also considered each other sisters, and Cox helped Anna with running the home. The Douglass children referred to her as "Aunt Harriet". While Douglass was in England from 1845 to 1847, he and Cox maintained a letter correspondence. Additionally, because Anna Douglass could not read well, Cox served as an intermediary, reading her the letters Douglass had written to her, and writing Anna's dictated replies.

In 1847, Cox met and became engaged to Perry Frank Adams (b. 1822), a man from Talbot County, Maryland who was working as a farmer in Springfield, Massachusetts. After becoming engaged, she wrote to Douglass to ask him to buy a wedding dress for her. Douglass, who had not been consulted on her engagement, responded negatively to the news, and the event seemed to strain the two's relationship and ended their regular correspondence. However, he did buy Cox her wedding dress, and she continued to write to Anna Douglass regularly until around 1861.

Cox and Adams married on November 11, 1847 at the Douglass household. Following their marriage, Adams moved to join her husband Springfield, Massachusetts, where Perry Adams began work at a gold-chain factory. The couple lived in a boardinghouse and eventually had three children: Matilda Ann (b. 1849 or 1850), Ebby B. (1852–1858), and Perry Frank Jr. (b. 1854). In 1859, Adams adopted Samuel Hall (b. 1854), after his mother, fellow boarder Eliza Hall, died. The family later boarded with abolitionist minister Eli Baptist.

While living in Springfield, both Cox and her husband remained involved with abolitionist organizations. Perry Adams may have been a member of the African-American self-defense group the League of Gideonites, founded in 1851 by John Brown, and was a Vice President of the Massachusetts State Council.

In 1861, Adams, her family, and the family of Eli Baptist moved to Drurea, Haiti, arriving in Port-au-Prince via the ship the Brig Maria and sponsored by the Haitian Bureau of Immigration. The family remained in Haiti until 1863, when Drurea was hit hard by illness, and returned to Springfield. In 1868, Perry Adams died from typhoid fever, which he had contracted while living in Haiti.

In the 1870s, Adams and her daughter Matilda Ann moved to Providence, Rhode Island, where Matilda married William Vanderzee, a member of a prominent African-American family from Lincoln, Nebraska, in 1878. In 1884, Adams, Matilda, and William moved to Norfolk, Nebraska, following the advice of a doctor that a "farm environment" might improve Williams health. They moved to Lincoln soon afterwards.

In 1894, Adams and Frederick Douglass reconnected via letter. Douglass had been searching for Adams for several years, and when he wrote her again he sent her money for a rocking chair. The two did not see each other in person before Douglass's death the following year.

After Adams' death in Lincoln in April 1900, she was buried in Wyuka Cemetery without a headstone.

== Legacy ==
Adams and her relationship with Douglas went largely unnoticed until 2002, when the Lincoln Journal Star wrote a story about a donation to the Nebraska Historical Society: a rosewood box which Douglass had given to Adams in 1846. The box was donated by Alyce McWilliams Hall, a descendent of Adams.

In 2005, members of the Wyuka Historical Foundation and McWilliams Hall, began raising funds for a headstone at Adams' gravesite. In 2008, a bronze grave marker was erected at the site.
