= Talbot County Courthouse (Maryland) =

Courthouse in Maryland, US

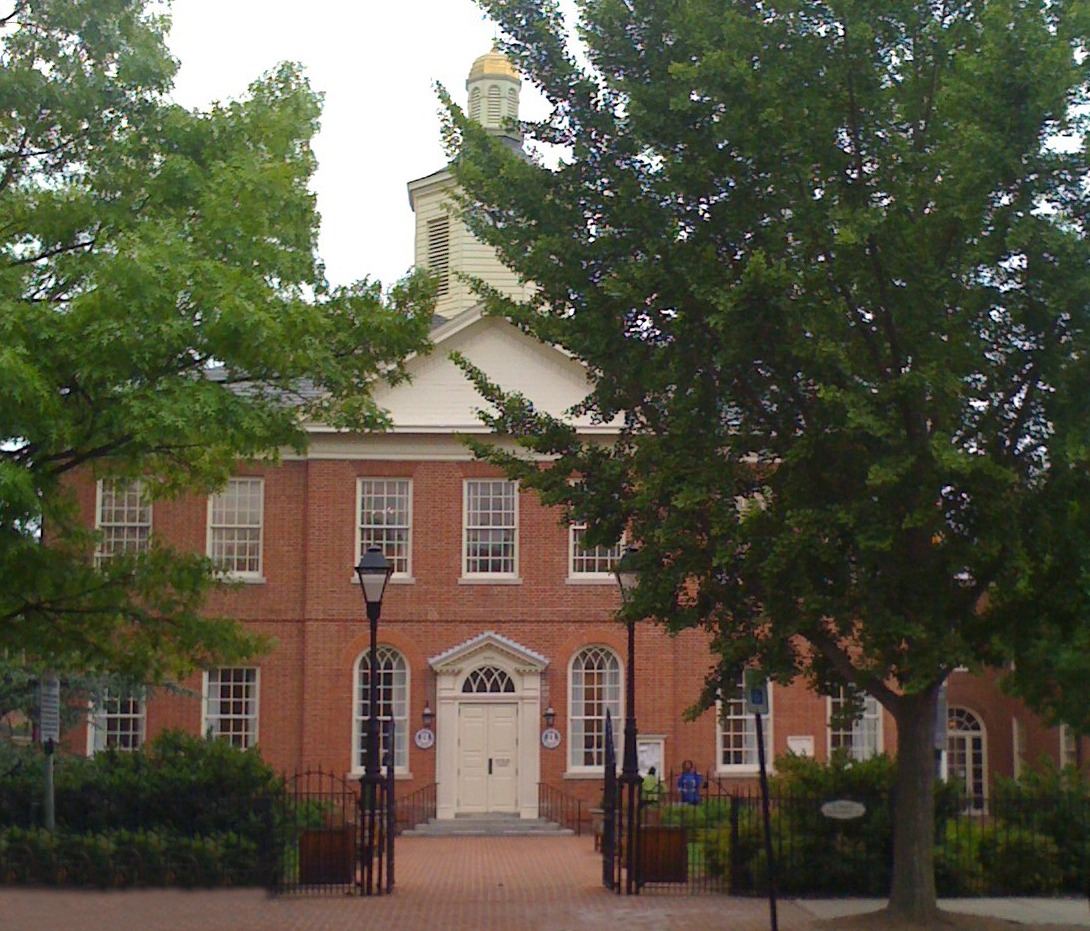
- Interactive map of the Talbot County Courthouse area

General information
- Architectural style: Georgian
- Location: Easton, Maryland, United States of America
- Coordinates: 38.7749°N 76.0766°W
- Construction started: 1794
- Cost: £3,000
- Client: Talbot County, Maryland

Design and construction
- Architect: Cornelius West

The Talbot County Courthouse is located at 11 North Washington Street in Easton, Maryland, United States. The courthouse houses the chambers and courtrooms for the judge of the Circuit Court for Talbot County, as well as the clerk's offices, jurors' assembly room, the master's office and the offices of the Talbot County Council.

== History ==
The abolitionist Frederick Douglass was held in the jail at the rear of the courthouse after his aborted attempt to escape slavery on April 2, 1836.

On May 27, 1862, Union Army General John Adams Dix issued orders for the arrest of Judge Richard Bennett Carmichael, suspected of being a southern sympathizer after requesting juries to serve indictments against federal officials who arrested three men acting disruptively at a union rally in November 1861. More than 125 deputies and soldiers surrounded the courthouse; two of them entered the courtroom and seized Carmichael. A man named John L. Bishop beat Carmichael over the head with his pistol until the judge was unconscious. Carmichael was dragged out of the courtroom and taken by steamer to Fort McHenry. Six months later he was released without ever being charged or tried for any crime.

== Statues ==
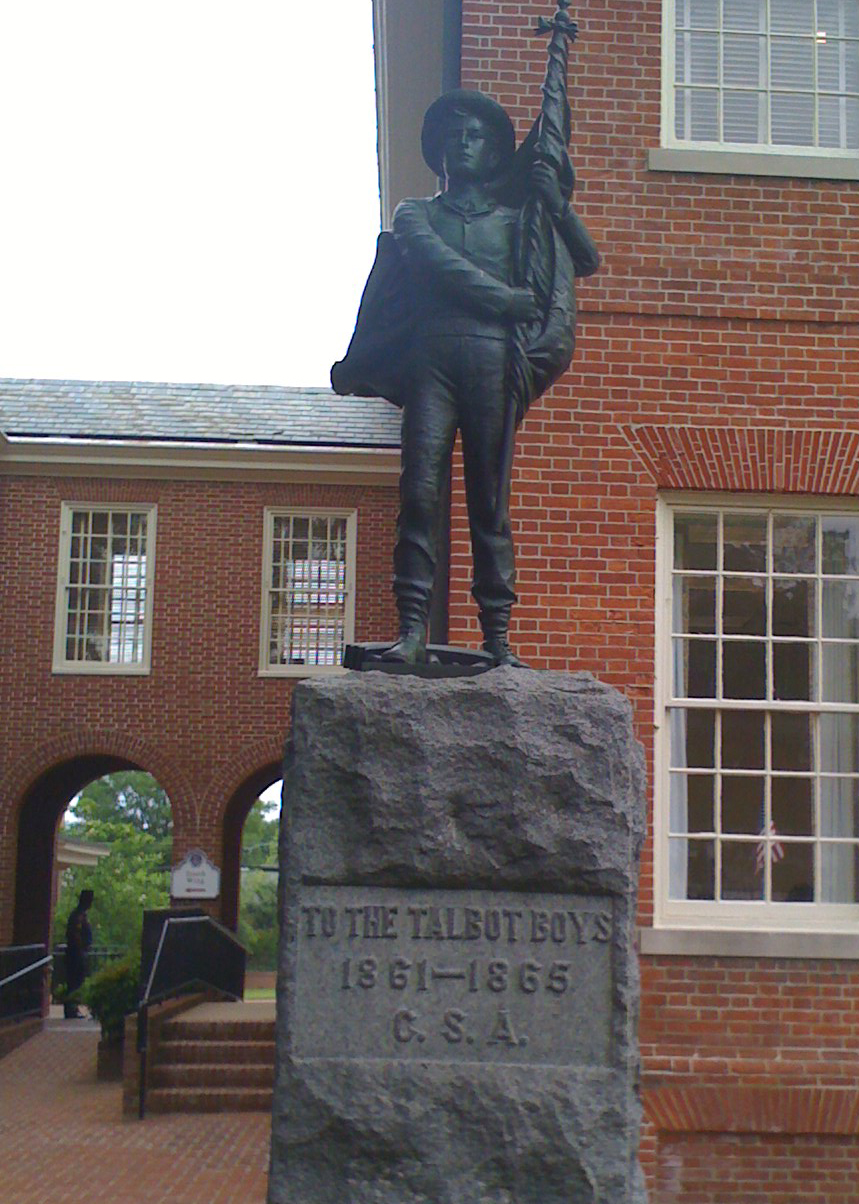
The "Talbot Boys" Confederate monument

The "Talbot Boys" statue, a monument to the Confederate army, was installed in front of the courthouse in 1916 and removed after years-long protests in March 2022. A statue of Frederick Douglass, installed in 2004, remains at the same site.
