= The Anchorage (Easton, Maryland) =

Historic house in Maryland, United States

- U.S. National Register of Historic Places
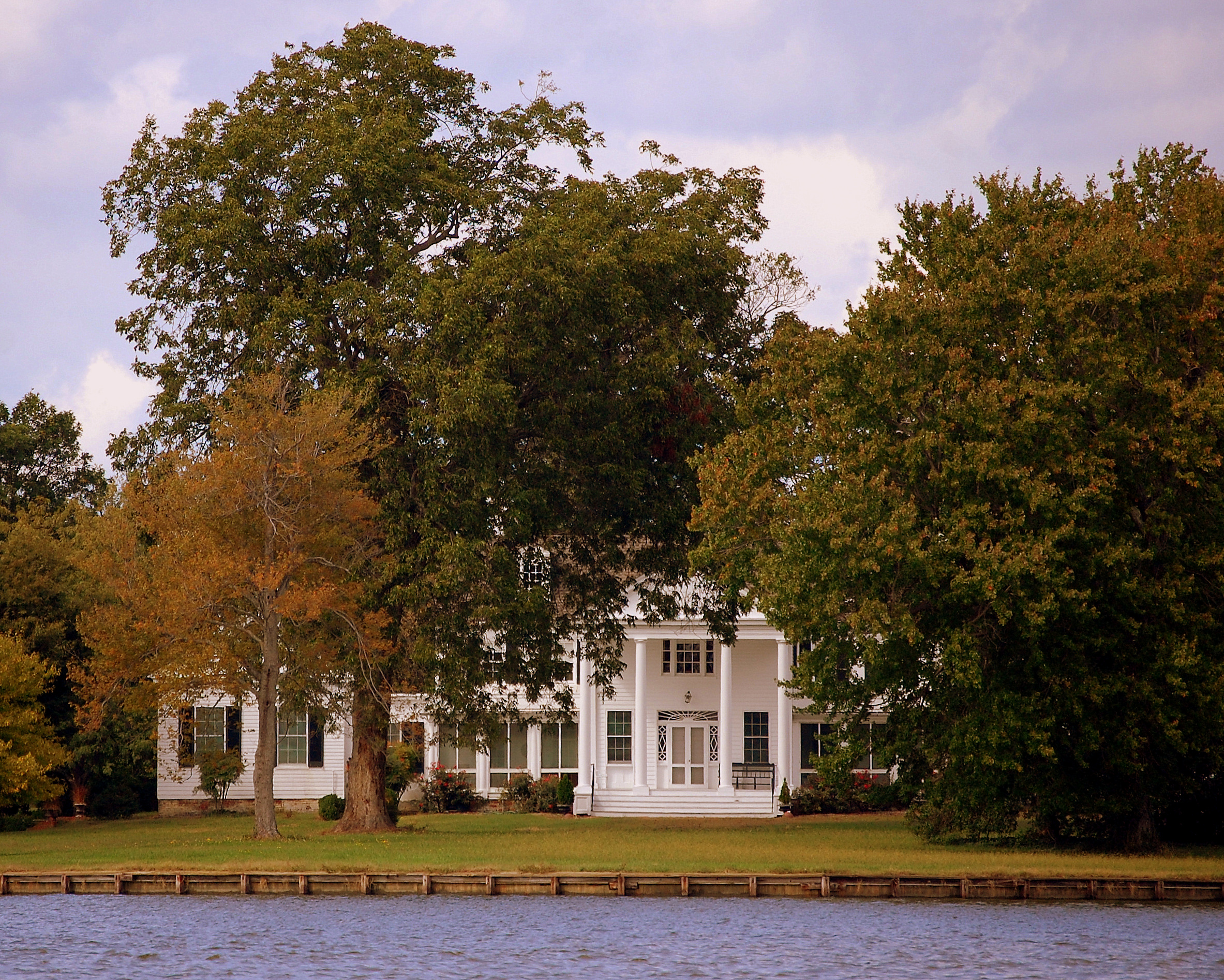

- Location within Maryland Location within the United States
- Location: Unionville Road (MD 370), Easton, Maryland
- Coordinates: 38°47′41″N 76°7′49″W
- Area: 9.9 acres (4.0 ha)
- Built: 1810
- Architectural style: Greek Revival
- NRHP reference No.: 74000968
- Added to NRHP: July 30, 1974

The Anchorage is a historic home in Easton, Talbot County, Maryland, United States. It is a five-part house with a large 2 1/2-story center section and small hyphens and wings. It has a 2-story Greek Revival porch supported by four Doric columns. The main section was built around 1810, with the wings probably added during the 1830s. Also on the property is a log smokehouse and a windmill. The Lloyd family of Wye House bought the property in 1831 and one of Governor Edward Lloyd's daughters and her husband went to live in it.

It was listed on the National Register of Historic Places in 1974.
