= Old Bloomfield =

Historic house in Maryland, United States

- U.S. National Register of Historic Places
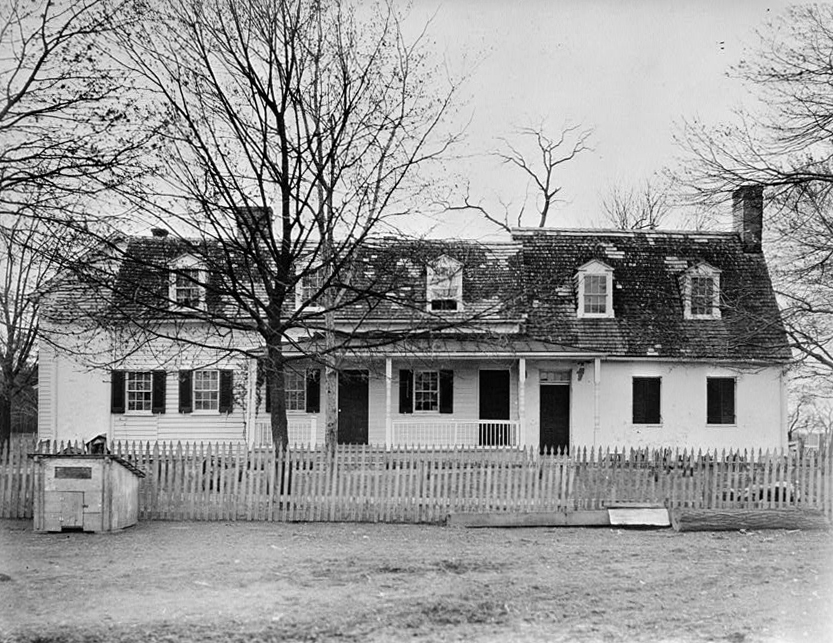

- Location within Maryland Location within the United States
- Location: West of Easton on Bloomfield Rd., Easton, Maryland
- Coordinates: 38°45′59″N 76°7′6″W
- Area: 7,405 acres (2,997 ha)
- Built: c. 1720
- NRHP reference No.: 80001836
- Added to NRHP: December 3, 1980

Old Bloomfield is a historic home at Easton, Talbot County, Maryland, United States. It is a large and sprawling structure constructed in three major sections: a 1 1/2-story, three bay brick section with a steeply pitched roof built about 1720; a 1 1/2-story frame addition on the southwest gable built about 1840; and a 2-story frame wing on the southwest end of this earlier addition. Also on the property is a small frame dairy, a heavy timber-frame crib, and a barn. It has remained in the same family as a working farm continuously since the 17th century.

Old Bloomfield was listed on the National Register of Historic Places in 1980.
