= Llandaff House =

Historic house in Maryland, United States

- U.S. National Register of Historic Places
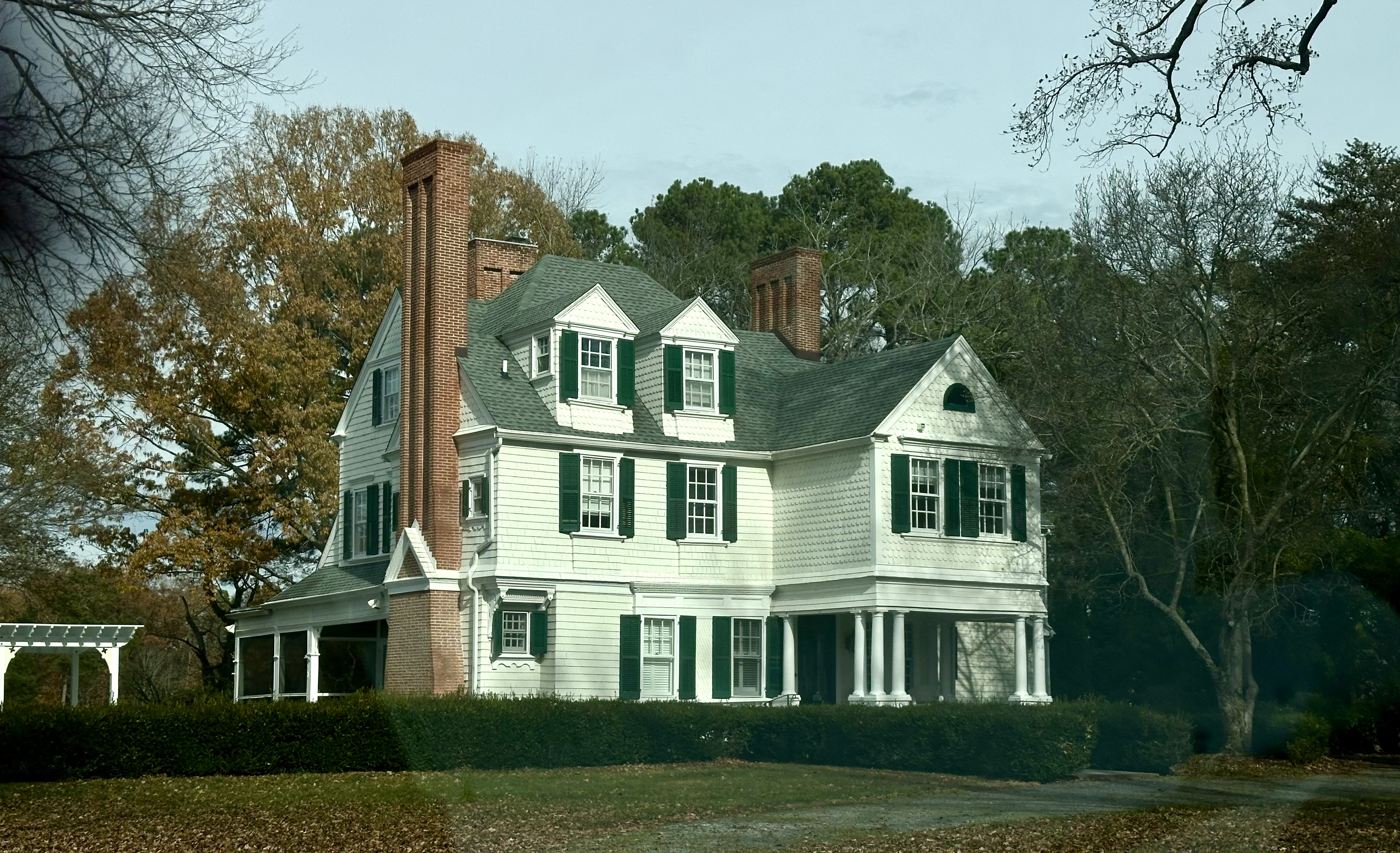

- Location within Maryland Location within the United States
- Location: 28472 Old Country Club Rd., Easton, Maryland
- Coordinates: 38°43′58″N 76°5′22″W
- Area: 13 acres (5.3 ha)
- Built: 1877-1878
- Architect: Hogan, Thomas
- Architectural style: Queen Anne, Stick/eastlake
- NRHP reference No.: 02001587
- Added to NRHP: December 27, 2002

Llandaff House is a historic home in Easton, Talbot County, Maryland, United States. It is a 2 1/2-story irregular plan frame house built in 1877–78, in a combined Queen Anne and Eastlake style. It features an asymmetrical front facade with a central entrance incorporated in a projecting two-story, two-bay pavilion distinguished by an open porch on the first floor. Also on the property are a late-19th-century three-story combination water tower and windmill and an early-20th-century frame boathouse. The grounds were professionally designed and executed by New York landscape architect Thomas Hogan.

Llandaff House was listed on the National Register of Historic Places in 2002.
