= Easton, Maryland =

- Town
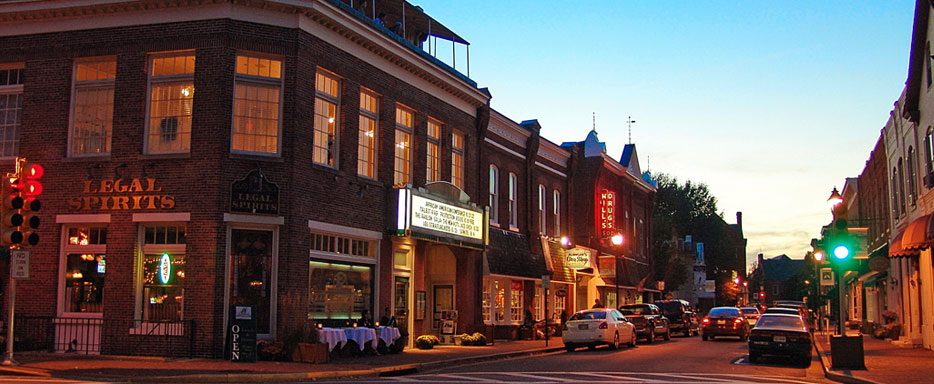

- Flag Seal

- Location within the U.S. state of Maryland Easton (the United States)
- Coordinates: 38°46′18″N 76°4′14″W
- Country: United States
- State: Maryland
- County: Talbot
- Incorporated: 1790

Government
  - Type: Mayor and Council
  - Mayor: Megan Cook

Area
  - Total: 11.52 sq mi (29.84 km^{2})
  - Land: 11.46 sq mi (29.68 km^{2})
  - Water: 0.062 sq mi (0.16 km^{2})
- Elevation: 23 ft (7 m)

Population (2020)
  - Total: 17,101
  - Density: 1,492.2/sq mi (576.15/km^{2})
- Time zone: UTC−5 (Eastern (EST))
  - Summer (DST): UTC−4 (EDT)
- ZIP Codes: 21601, 21606
- Area code: 410
- FIPS code: 24-24475
- GNIS feature ID: 0584235
- Website: eastonmd.gov

Easton is an incorporated town in and the county seat of Talbot County, Maryland, United States. The population was 17,101 at the 2020 census, with an estimated population of 17,342 in 2022. The primary ZIP Code is 21601, and the secondary is 21606. The primary phone exchange is 822, the auxiliary exchanges are 690, 819, 820, 763, and 770, and the area code is 410.

Easton may be named because of its location east of Saint Michaels; however, it is more likely that it was named after Easton in Somerset, England.

== History ==
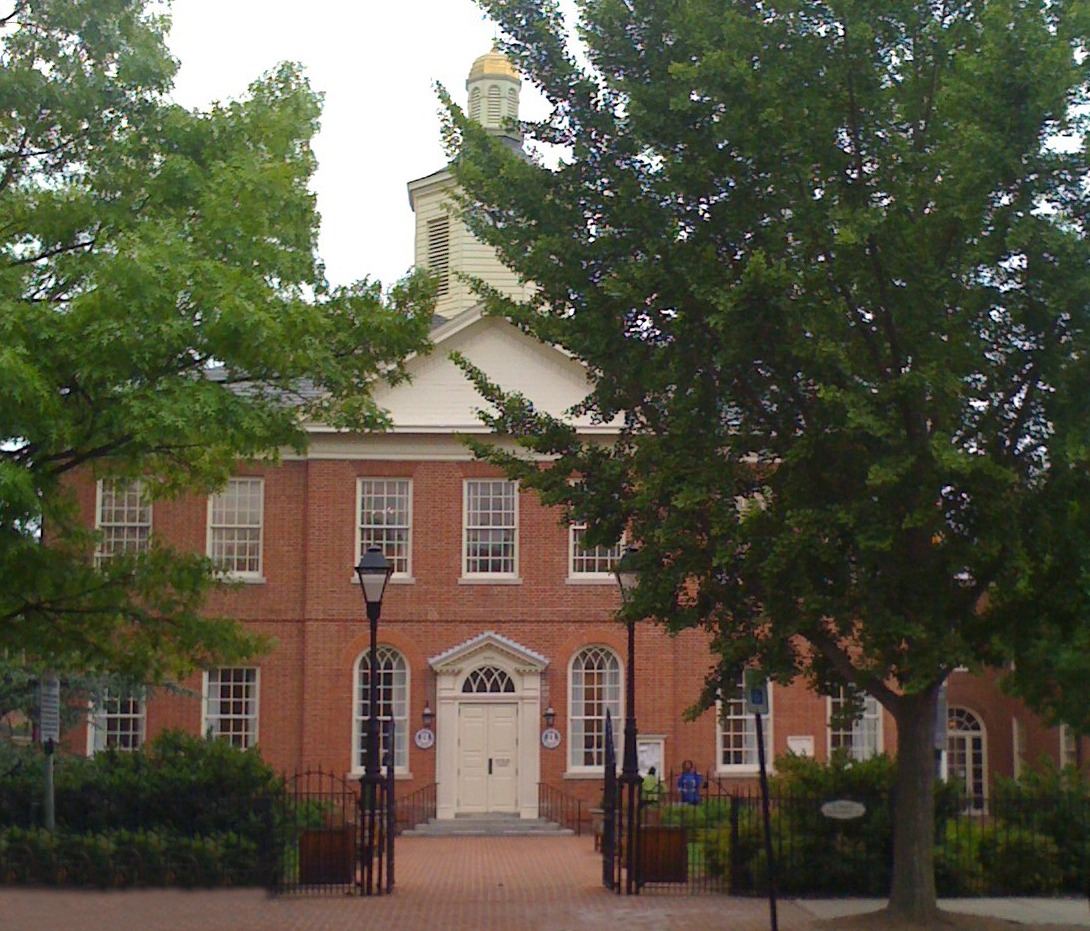
Courthouse in Downtown Easton

=== 18th century ===
The town of Easton received its official beginning from an Act of the Assembly of the Province of Maryland dated November 4, 1710. The act was entitled, "An Act for the Building of a Court House for Talbot County, at Armstrong's Old Field near Pitt's Bridge". Pitt's Bridge crossed a stream forming the headwaters of the Tred Avon or Third Haven River. It was located at a point where North Washington Street crosses this stream, now enclosed in culverts, north of the Talbottown Shopping Center, and passes under the Electric Plant property. Prior to this date, the court had met at York, near the mouth of Skipton Creek. The court decided that this location was not convenient to all sections of the county and, in order to change the location, the above act of the Assembly was passed. As a result of this act, two acres of land were purchased from Philemon Armstrong, at a cost of 15,000 pounds of tobacco. Upon this tract, the same plot upon which the present Talbot County Courthouse now stands, the court house, a brick building 20 x 30 feet, was erected at a cost of 115,000 pounds of tobacco. The courts of the county were held in this building from 1712 until 1794. A tavern to accommodate those who attended court was one of the first buildings erected; stores and dwellings followed. The village was then known as "Talbot Court House". These were not the first buildings in the area. The frame meeting house of the Society of Friends was built between 1682 and 1684. The Wye plantation was settled in the 1650s by Welsh Puritan and wealthy planter Edward Lloyd and is owned and occupied by the 11th generation of that family.

In the 1790 census, 410 free people of color lived in Easton's Hill neighborhood. Scholars believe that it may the oldest enclave of free African Americans, and the oldest existing black neighborhood, in the country.

=== 19th century ===
By 1810, Easton had become the largest town on the Eastern Shore and seemed destined to be its richest, most progressive, and important for a century to come.

=== 20th century ===
In 1906, Easton adopted a new town charter that replaced the town commissioner's system, which had been in place since 1791, with a mayor and council system. This new charter not only gave the town significant new authority but also created the office of the mayor. That same year, the town elected its first mayor Martin M. Higgins, who served from 1906-1908 and 1910-1914. Higgins originated programs that gave Easton paved streets, concrete gutters and sidewalks, and municipally owned and operated water, sewer, gas and electric systems.

In 1907, Easton opened its first ever hospital, Easton Emergency Hospital. The effort to open the medical center was led by nurse and suffragist Mary Bartlett Dixon and Elizabeth Wright.

In 1914, Easton became the first Maryland municipality to establish a complete sewer system.

In 1915, Easton opened its first municipal electric plant, replacing the private company that since 1888 had provided power only from dusk to midnight. The new town plant was one of the first in the world to supply Alternating current instead of the Direct current system that was popular at the time.

In 1916, the town erected the "Talbot Boys" statue in honor of Confederate soldiers from Talbot County. It stood for 107 years before being removed in 2022 after years of controversy.

In 1919, Isaiah Fountain, a black farmer from Trappe, was the last person to be legally executed on the Eastern Shore after being found guilty of sexually assaulting a girl aged 13 to 14 on April 1 or 2, 1919. Due to the theatrics and sensationalized nature of the case by the local media, it became a national story. After the first day of his trial, a mob of 2,000 assembled on courthouse grounds, and some of which attempted to grab and lynch Fountain. He remained unharmed and was able to escape through an open window. He was subsequently rearrested and found guilty on April 25, 1919. A retrial for Fountain was granted in July 1919 with a change of venue to Baltimore County, in Towson. He was found guilty again in May 1920 in the retrial and finally executed for the crime on June 11, 1920.

In 1989, a federal court sided with the American Civil Liberties Union and ordered the creation of a majority-black district in Easton, eliminating the at-large council system.

=== 21st century ===
In 2008, a lost painting of a Paris street scene by Édouard Cortès was discovered amongst donated items at a Goodwill Industries store in Easton. After an alert store manager noticed that it was a signed original, the painting was auctioned for $40,600 at Sotheby's.

In 2011, local officials erected a statue of Frederick Douglass, the noted abolitionist, who was born a slave in 1818 at the Wye River plantation in northern Talbot County.

In 2015, and again in August 2020, the Talbot County Council voted against removing the Talbot Boys statue, but in September 2021, the council voted to remove the statue. On March 14, 2022, the statue was removed.

In 2018, Easton was named one of America's top 5 coolest places to buy a vacation home by Forbes.

== Geography ==
According to the United States Census Bureau, the town has a total area of 10.67 square miles (27.64 km^{2}), of which 10.56 square miles (27.35 km^{2}) is land and 0.11 square miles (0.28 km^{2}) is water.

=== Climate ===
The climate in this area is characterized by hot, humid summers and generally mild to cool winters. According to the Köppen climate classification system, Easton has a humid subtropical climate (Cfa).

== Demographics ==
Historical population
Census	Pop.	Note	%±
1850	1,413		—
1860	1,358		−3.9%
1870	2,110		55.4%
1880	3,005		42.4%
1890	2,939		−2.2%
1900	3,074		4.6%
1910	3,083		0.3%
1920	3,443		11.7%
1930	2,092		−39.2%
1940	4,528		116.4%
1950	4,836		6.8%
1960	6,337		31.0%
1970	6,809		7.4%
1980	7,536		10.7%
1990	9,372		24.4%
2000	11,708		24.9%
2010	15,945		36.2%
2020	17,101		7.2%
U.S. Decennial Census

=== 2020 census ===
As of the 2020 census, Easton had a population of 17,101. The median age was 44.8 years. 20.5% of residents were under the age of 18 and 26.9% of residents were 65 years of age or older. For every 100 females there were 84.9 males, and for every 100 females age 18 and over there were 80.1 males age 18 and over.

99.9% of residents lived in urban areas, while 0.1% lived in rural areas.

There were 7,340 households in Easton, of which 26.7% had children under the age of 18 living in them. Of all households, 40.7% were married-couple households, 16.1% were households with a male householder and no spouse or partner present, and 37.4% were households with a female householder and no spouse or partner present. About 35.3% of all households were made up of individuals and 20.3% had someone living alone who was 65 years of age or older.

There were 7,921 housing units, of which 7.3% were vacant. The homeowner vacancy rate was 2.0% and the rental vacancy rate was 6.2%.

Racial composition as of the 2020 census
Race	Number	Percent
White	11,356	66.4%
Black or African American	2,512	14.7%
American Indian and Alaska Native	112	0.7%
Asian	388	2.3%
Native Hawaiian and Other Pacific Islander	8	0.0%
Some other race	1,434	8.4%
Two or more races	1,291	7.5%
Hispanic or Latino (of any race)	2,454	14.4%

=== 2010 census ===
There were 6,711 households, of which 29.2% had children under the age of 18 living with them, 42.8% were married couples living together, 13.8% had a female householder with no husband present, 4.2% had a male householder with no wife present, and 39.2% were non-families. 33.1% of all households were made up of individuals, and 16.9% had someone living alone who was 65 years of age or older. The average household size was 2.32 and the average family size was 2.92.

The median age in the town was 41.2 years. Of residents 22.3% were under the age of 18; 7.6% were between the ages of 18 and 24; 24.8% were from 25 to 44; 24.1% were from 45 to 64; and 21.2% were 65 years of age or older. The gender make-up of the town was 46.4% male and 53.6% female.

=== Income and poverty ===
The median income for a household in the town was $94,991. 11.5% of the population were below the poverty line, including 12.9% of those under age 18 and 12.9% of those age 65 or over.

== Neighborhoods ==
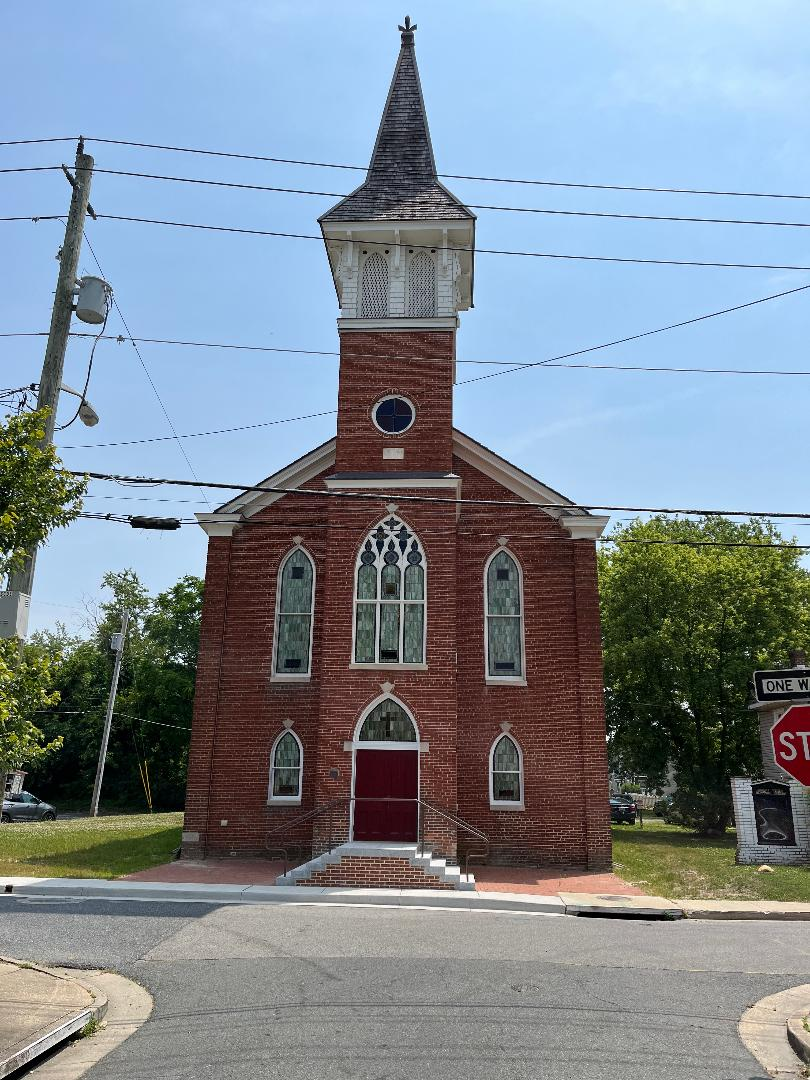
Asbury Methodist Episcopal Church in The Hill

- Ashby Commons
- Ashby Park
- Beechwood
- Bretridge
- Calvert Terrace
- Chapel East
- Cookes Hope
- Crofton
- Easton Club
- Easton Village
- Golton
- The Hill (America's oldest free Black community c.1790)
- Lakelands
- Mulberry Station
- St. Aubins Heights
- South Beechwood
- South Clifton
- Stoney Ridge (Corbin Parkway)
- Matthewstown Run
- The Waylands

== Infrastructure ==
=== Transportation ===
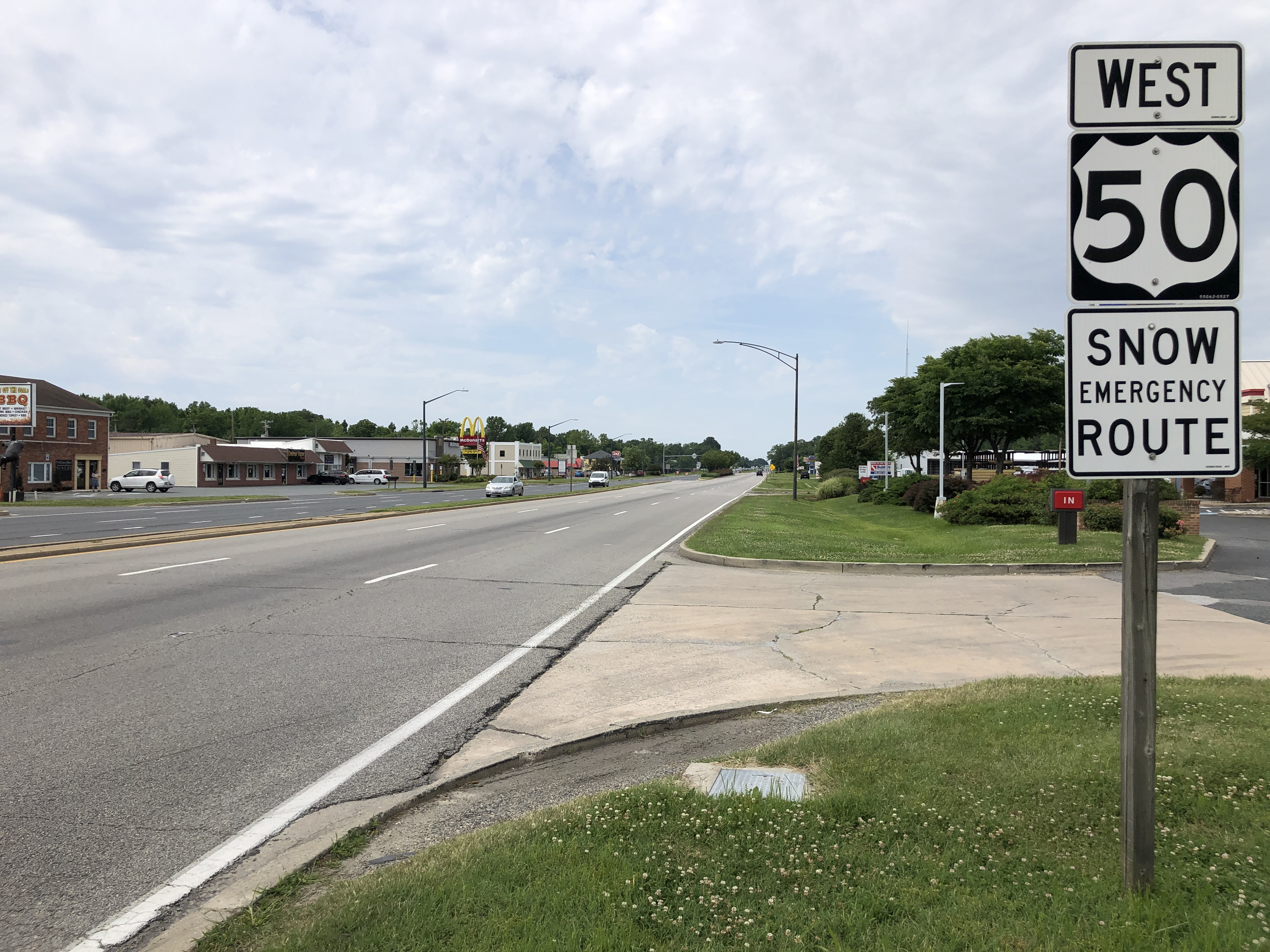
US 50 westbound in Easton

U.S. Route 50 runs north–south through the eastern part of the town along Ocean Gateway, heading northwest toward the Chesapeake Bay Bridge and southeast toward Cambridge, Salisbury, and Ocean City. Maryland Route 322 bypasses Easton to the west along the Easton Parkway. Washington Street serves as the main street of Easton, running north–south, with the southernmost section connecting to MD 322 a part of Maryland Route 565. Maryland Route 33 heads west from Washington Street on Bay Street, leading to St. Michaels and Tilghman Island. Maryland Route 333 heads southwest from Washington Street on Peachblossom Rd, heading west to Oxford. Maryland Route 334 runs along Port Street between MD 322 and Washington Street. Goldsborough Street heads east from downtown Easton and becomes Maryland Route 328 upon crossing US 50, heading northeast to Denton. Dover Street heads east from downtown Easton and becomes Maryland Route 331 upon crossing US 50, heading southeast to Preston and Vienna. Maryland Route 309 begins at US 50 north of Easton and heads northeast toward Queen Anne. Maryland Route 662 heads north from Easton, paralleling US 50.

Easton Airport, a general aviation airport, is located to the north of Easton. The nearest airports to Easton with commercial air service are the Salisbury–Ocean City–Wicomico Regional Airport near Salisbury and the Baltimore–Washington International Airport near Baltimore.

Delmarva Community Transit provides bus service to Easton, operating multiple routes to towns in Talbot, Queen Anne's, Kent, Caroline, and Dorchester counties along with a shuttle to Chesapeake College and the local Route C and Route D buses serving points in Easton.

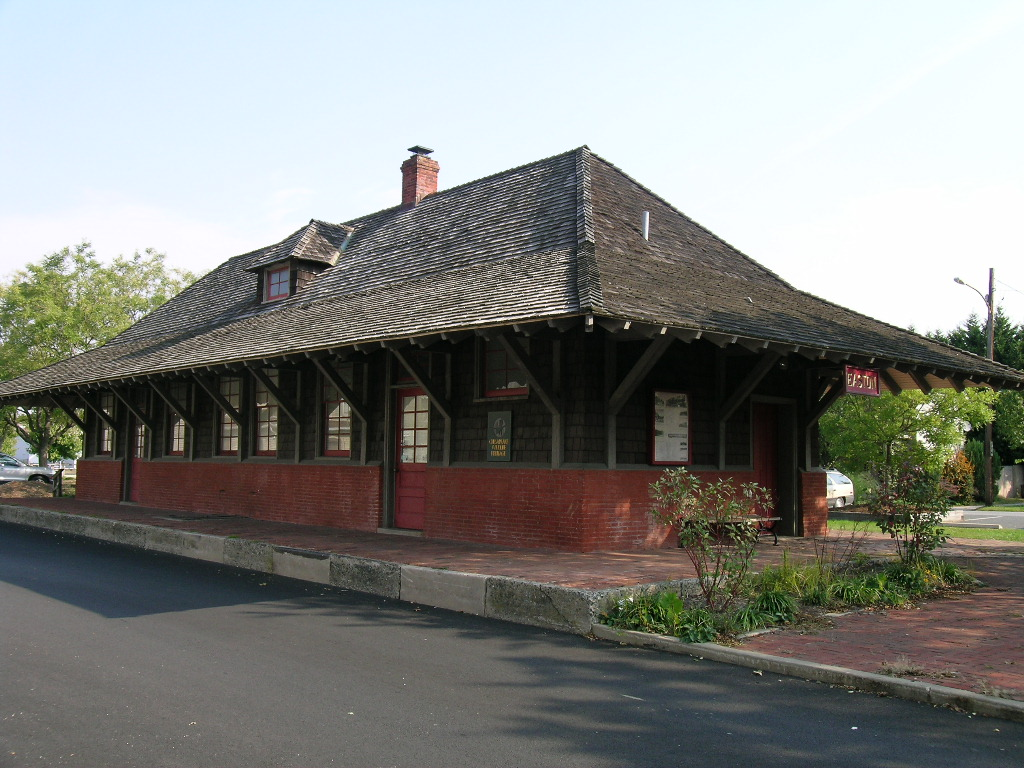
Easton's train station

The Pennsylvania Railroad operated trains from New York and Philadelphia to Easton until the late 1940s.

=== Utilities ===
Easton Utilities, which is owned by the town of Easton, provides electricity, natural gas, water, wastewater service, cable, internet, and telephone service to the town. The utility commission was founded in 1914 and had control of all utility services in 1923, making Easton the first community in the state to own all its utility services. Easton Utilities provides electricity to over 10,000 customers, with most electricity purchased and some also generated by the town during times of high prices. The town owns 18 diesel-powered electric generators with a total capacity of 69 megawatts at two sites, one at a plant built in 1923 located in the center of town on Washington Street and the other located near the Easton Airport. Easton Utilities provides natural gas to over 4,500 customers, with natural gas purchased from the Eastern Shore Natural Gas Company. The town's natural gas supply is piped from the Gulf of Mexico via an interstate pipeline to Federalsburg, where 100 miles (160 km) of steel and plastic mains then deliver it to customers in Easton. The town, which has owned the natural gas utility since 1923, formerly delivered gas to customers by burning coal at a plant on West Street, but converted to natural gas in 1966. Easton Utilities is the only municipal natural gas utility in Maryland. Easton Utilities provides water to 6,800 customers, with 84 miles (135 km) of water mains and over 550 fire hydrants. The town gets its water from six wells that draw from underground aquifers, with the water then treated and stored. Easton Utilities provides wastewater service to about 6,800 customers, operating more than 90 miles (140 km) of wastewater mains, six pumping stations, and a wastewater treatment plant. Easton Utilities' cable service, branded as Easton Velocity, is one of a few municipal cable systems in the United States. The cable system in Easton was first built in 1984 and upgraded to a hybrid fiber/coax design in 2001. Internet service through Easton Utilities is provided under the Easton Velocity brand, utilizing a fiber-optic network. Easton Utilities' telephone service operates under the Easton Velocity DigitalVoice brand. The town's Public Works department provides trash and recycling collection to Easton, with trash collection utilizing automated tipper cans.

=== Health care ===
University of Maryland Shore Regional Health operates the University of Maryland Shore Medical Center at Easton in Easton, a hospital with 112 beds, 20 acute care inpatient beds, and an emergency room. In 1906, Judge William R. Martin commissioned Mary Bartlett Dixon to serve as the treasurer and help establish a hospital in Easton Maryland. She began the hospital in a rented building, which later burned to the ground. Dixon and Elizabeth Wright Dixon received $43, 000 to construct the Memorial Hospital. Together, the woman began a nursing school in 1907. The school was run by volunteers.

=== Schools ===
The Talbot County Public Schools includes the Easton High School.

== Sports ==
Easton was home to minor league baseball, as the Easton Yankees and other Easton teams played as members of the Class D level Eastern Shore League between 1924 and 1949. Baseball Hall of Fame members Home Run Baker and Jimmie Foxx both played for Easton.

== In popular culture ==
Octavia E. Butler's novel Kindred is set in part at a fictional plantation near Easton.

Much of the 2005 film Wedding Crashers was filmed at the Ellenborough Estate in Easton.

== Notable people ==
- Ruth Cox Adams, abolitionist
- Harold Baines, MLB baseball player, Hall of Fame member
- Birch Bayh, United States senator from Indiana (1963–1981)
- J. Harry Covington, U.S. Representative for Maryland's 1st congressional district
- Delino DeShields Jr., MLB baseball player
- Frances Farrand Dodge, (1878 - 1969), artist
- Frederick Douglass, author and abolitionist
- Charles Hopper Gibson, U.S. Senator and congressman, lived at Ratcliffe Manor
- Jeannie Haddaway-Riccio, member of the Maryland House of Delegates
- Leslie Holdridge, 20th century climatologist
- William S. Horne, member of the Maryland House of Delegates, judge, and lawyer
- Harry Hughes, Maryland governor (1979–1987)
- Edward Lloyd (Colonial Governor of Maryland) (1670–1718), Governor of the Maryland Colony, 1709–1714
- Edward Lloyd (Continental Congress) (1744–1796), Maryland delegate to the Continental Congress
- John A. Moaney, personal assistant to the Eisenhower family 1942-78
- Chris Moore, producer for films including American Pie and Good Will Hunting
- William O. Mills, U.S. Representative for Maryland's 1st congressional district
- John Blake Rice, Mayor of Chicago, Illinois from 1865 to 1869.
- Maggie Rogers, singer, songwriter and producer
- William Pierce Rogers (1913–2001), Cabinet officer in the administrations of presidents Eisenhower and Nixon
- James W. Rouse, real-estate developer, civic activist, and free enterprise-based philanthropist
- Forrest Shreve, botanist
- Gerard C. Smith, attorney and arms control expert involved with the Moscow–Washington hotline
- Philip F. Thomas, Maryland governor (1848–1851), U.S. Secretary of the Treasury under President Buchanan (1860–1861)
- Oswald Tilghman, Confederate Army officer, lawyer, author, politician
- Tench Tilghman, aide-de-camp for George Washington
- Anne Truitt, proto-minimalist sculptor
- Gene Tunney, former heavyweight champion
- Robert Mitchum, actor
- James A. Michener, author

== Notable landmarks ==
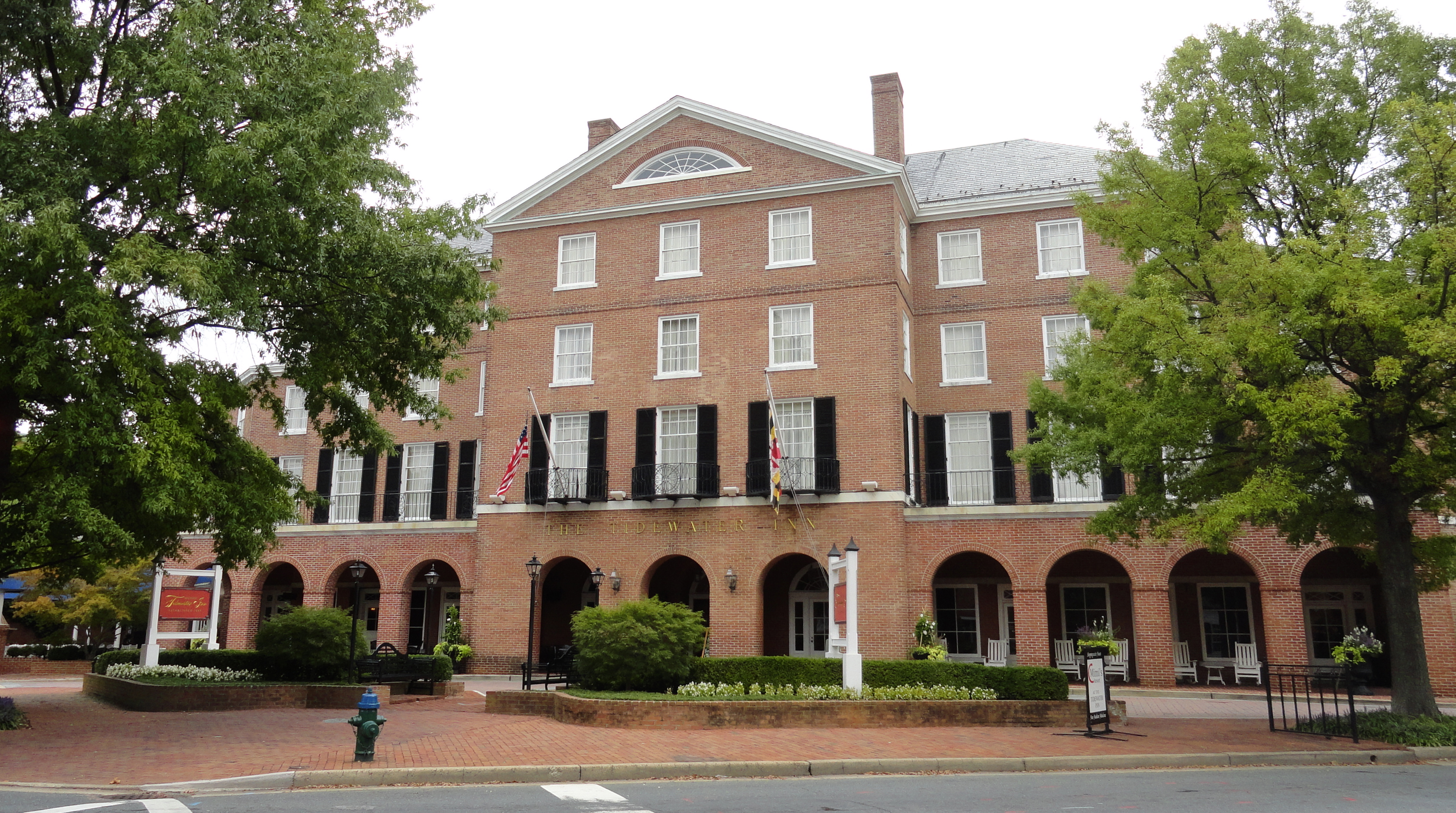
Tidewater Inn

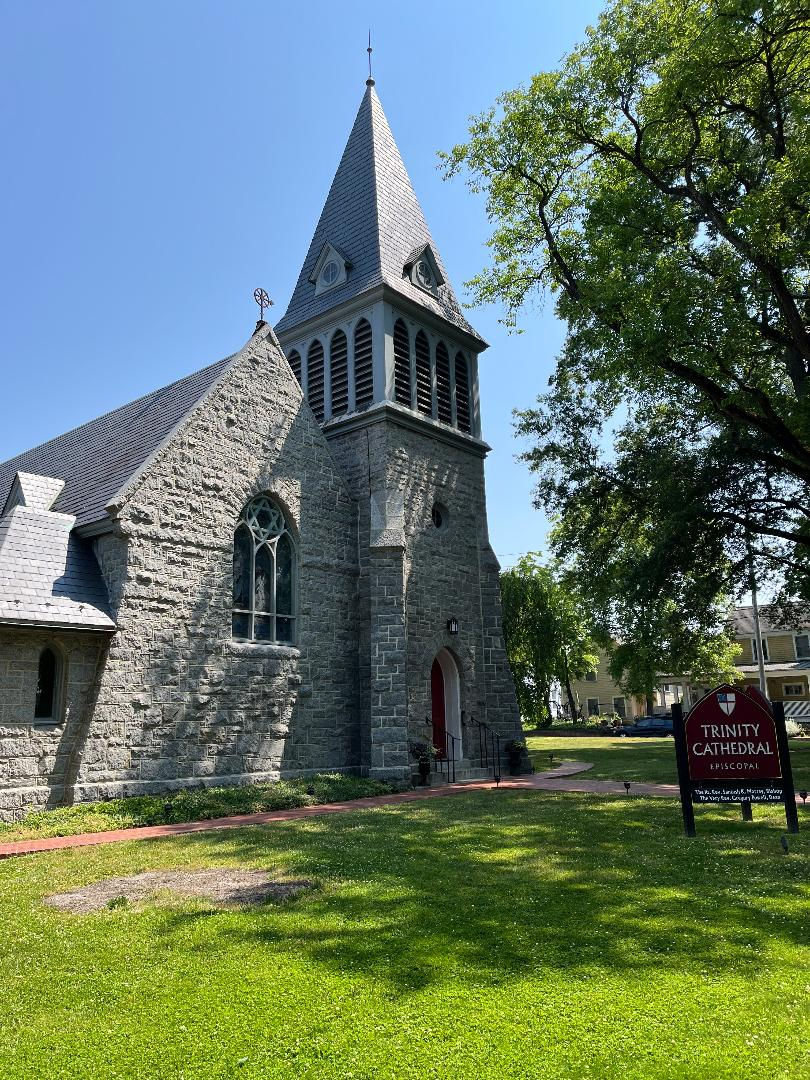
Trinity Cathedral

- Academy Art Museum
- All Saints' Church - listed on the National Register of Historic Places.
- The Anchorage - listed on the National Register of Historic Places.
- Avalon Theatre
- Doncaster Town Site - listed on the National Register of Historic Places.
- Hope House
- Llandaff House - listed on the National Register of Historic Places.
- Myrtle Grove - listed on the National Register of Historic Places, part of Historic American Buildings Survey
- Old Bloomfield - listed on the National Register of Historic Places, part of Historic American Buildings Survey
- Ratcliffe Manor - part of Historic American Buildings Survey
- Spring Hill Cemetery
- St. John's Chapel of St. Michael's Parish - listed on the National Register of Historic Places.
- The Talbot Boys - relocated in 2022 to Cross Keys battlefield in Virginia
- Third Haven Meeting House, part of Historic American Buildings Survey
- Tidewater Inn - listed on the National Register of Historic Places.
- Trinity Cathedral
- Troth's Fortune - listed on the National Register of Historic Places, part of Historic American Buildings Survey
- Wye House - listed on the National Register of Historic Places.
- Wye Town Farm House - listed on the National Register of Historic Places.
