= St. John's Chapel of St. Michael's Parish =

Historic church in Maryland, United States

- U.S. National Register of Historic Places
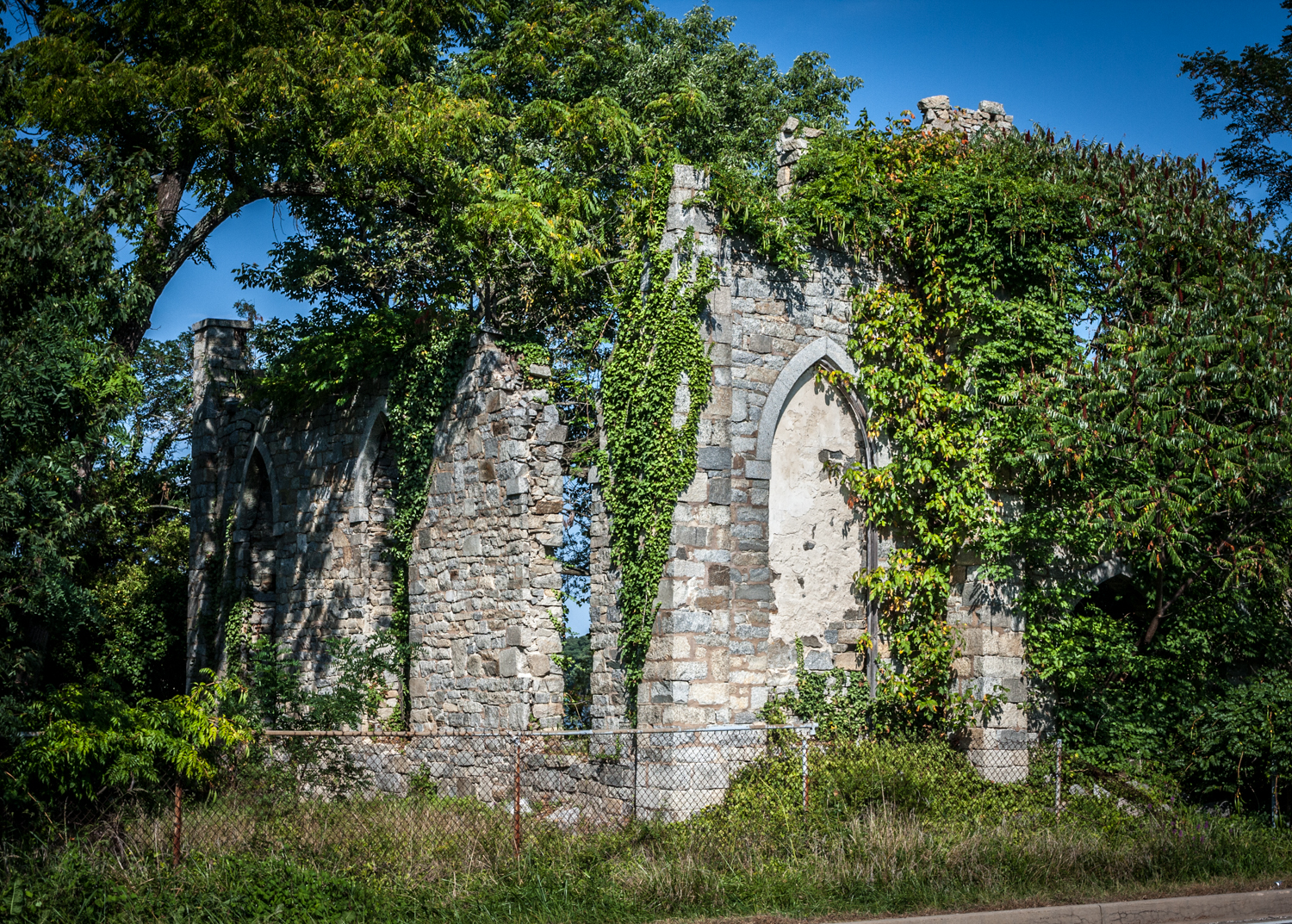
- Remains of St. John's Chapel of St. Michael's Parish in Easton, MD

- Location within Maryland Location within the United States
- Location: Unionville Road (MD 370), Easton, Maryland
- Coordinates: 38°47′46″N 76°7′43″W
- Area: 4 acres (1.6 ha)
- Built: 1835
- Architectural style: Gothic Revival
- NRHP reference No.: 73000938
- Added to NRHP: March 30, 1973

St. John's Chapel of St. Michael's Parish is a historic Episcopal church at Easton, Talbot County, Maryland. It is a granite Gothic Revival ruin. The building measures 35 feet wide and 50 feet deep. The chapel was built in about 1835 and abandoned around 1895.

It was listed on the National Register of Historic Places in 1973.
