= Trappe, Maryland =

- Town
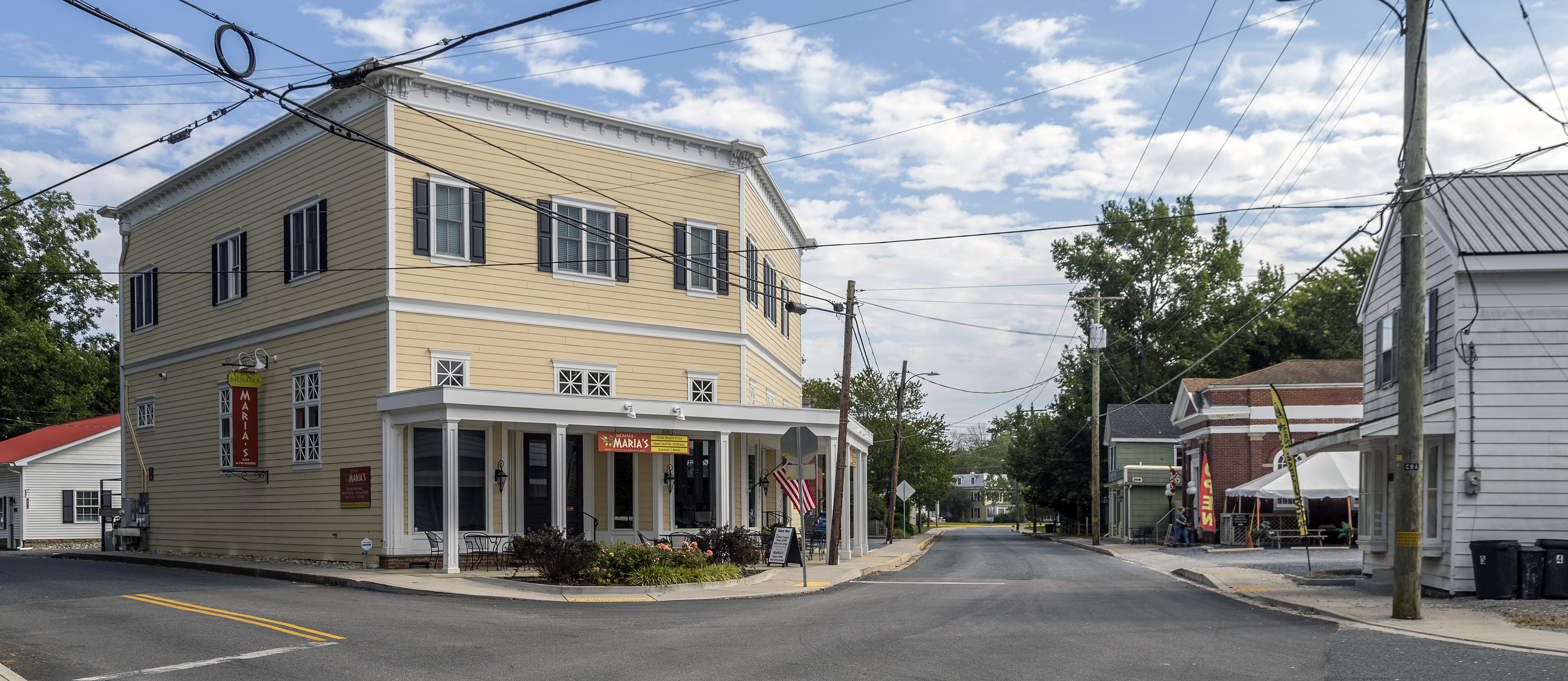
- Central Trappe in 2021

- Seal
- Motto: "19th Century Charm - 21st Century Progress"
- Location of Trappe, Maryland

- Location within the U.S. state of Maryland Trappe (the United States)
- Coordinates: 38°39′36″N 76°3′29″W
- Country: United States
- State: Maryland
- County: Talbot
- Incorporated: 1827

Government
  - Type: Council
  - President: Jeremy Newnam

Area
  - Total: 2.67 sq mi (6.91 km^{2})
  - Land: 2.67 sq mi (6.91 km^{2})
  - Water: 0 sq mi (0.00 km^{2})
- Elevation: 52 ft (16 m)

Population (2020)
  - Total: 1,177
  - Density: 441.4/sq mi (170.41/km^{2})
- Time zone: UTC-5 (Eastern (EST))
  - Summer (DST): UTC-4 (EDT)
- ZIP code: 21673
- Area code: 410
- FIPS code: 24-78575
- GNIS feature ID: 0591425
- Website: http://trappemd.net/

Trappe is a town in Talbot County, Maryland, United States. As of the 2020 census, Trappe had a population of 1,177. It is the site of one of the largest mixed-use developments on the U.S. East Coast called Trappe East or "Lakeside" with controversy arising over its wastewater treatment.

== History ==
Trappe was incorporated in 1827. It may have been named for either wolf traps or a Trappist monastery.

Compton and The Wilderness are listed on the National Register of Historic Places.

A Blessing Box was installed at the Trappe Volunteer Firehouse in 2019 by Josh Cherry.

== Geography ==
Trappe is located at 38°39′36″N 76°3′29″W (38.659870, -76.058053).

According to the United States Census Bureau, the town has a total area of 2.78 square miles (7.20 km^{2}), all land.

== Demographics ==
Historical population
Census	Pop.	Note	%±
1860	305		—
1870	272		−10.8%
1880	301		10.7%
1890	261		−13.3%
1900	279		6.9%
1910	273		−2.2%
1920	236		−13.6%
1930	226		−4.2%
1940	296		31.0%
1950	325		9.8%
1960	358		10.2%
1970	426		19.0%
1980	739		73.5%
1990	974		31.8%
2000	1,146		17.7%
2010	1,077		−6.0%
2020	1,177		9.3%
U.S. Decennial Census

=== 2010 census ===
As of the census of 2010, there were 1,077 people, 434 households, and 299 families residing in the town. The population density was 387.4 inhabitants per square mile (149.6/km^{2}). There were 491 housing units at an average density of 176.6 per square mile (68.2/km^{2}). The racial makeup of the town was 65.3% White, 28.1% African American, 0.6% Native American, 1.3% Asian, 2.4% from other races, and 2.2% from two or more races. Hispanic or Latino of any race were 6.3% of the population.

There were 434 households, of which 32.0% had children under the age of 18 living with them, 48.4% were married couples living together, 14.5% had a female householder with no husband present, 6.0% had a male householder with no wife present, and 31.1% were non-families. 23.7% of all households were made up of individuals and 8.5% had someone living alone who was 65 years of age or older. The average household size was 2.48 and the average family size was 2.91.

The median age in the town was 39.5 years. 22.5% of residents were under the age of 18; 9.2% were between the ages of 18 and 24; 25.5% were from 25 to 44; 30% were from 45 to 64; and 12.6% were 65 years of age or older. The gender makeup of the town was 48.0% male and 52.0% female.

=== 2000 census ===
As of the census of 2000, there were 1,146 people, 425 households, and 328 families residing in the town. The population density was 1,387.9 inhabitants per square mile (535.9/km^{2}). There were 450 housing units at an average density of 545.0 per square mile (210.4/km^{2}). The racial makeup of the town was 72.34% White, 23.39% African American, 0.44% Native American, 0.70% Asian, 1.05% from other races, and 2.09% from two or more races. Hispanic or Latino of any race were 2.62% of the population.

There were 425 households, out of which 41.4% had children under the age of 18 living with them, 57.2% were married couples living together, 15.1% had a female householder with no husband present, and 22.6% were non-families. 16.2% of all households were made up of individuals and 7.1% had someone living alone who was 65 years of age or older. The average household size was 2.70 and the average family size was 2.95.

In the town, the population was spread out, with 28.8% under the age of 18, 6.7% from 18 to 24, 32.5% from 25 to 44, 22.0% from 45 to 64, and 10.0% who were 65 years of age or older. The median age was 34 years. For every 100 females, there were 92.0 males. For every 100 females age 18 and over, there were 84.2 males.

The median income for a household in the town was $40,625, and the median income for a family was $42,188. Males had a median income of $30,398 versus $26,302 for females. The per capita income for the town was $17,451. About 9.6% of families and 9.7% of the population were below the poverty line, including 10.9% of those under age 18 and 7.9% of those age 65 or over.

== Transportation ==
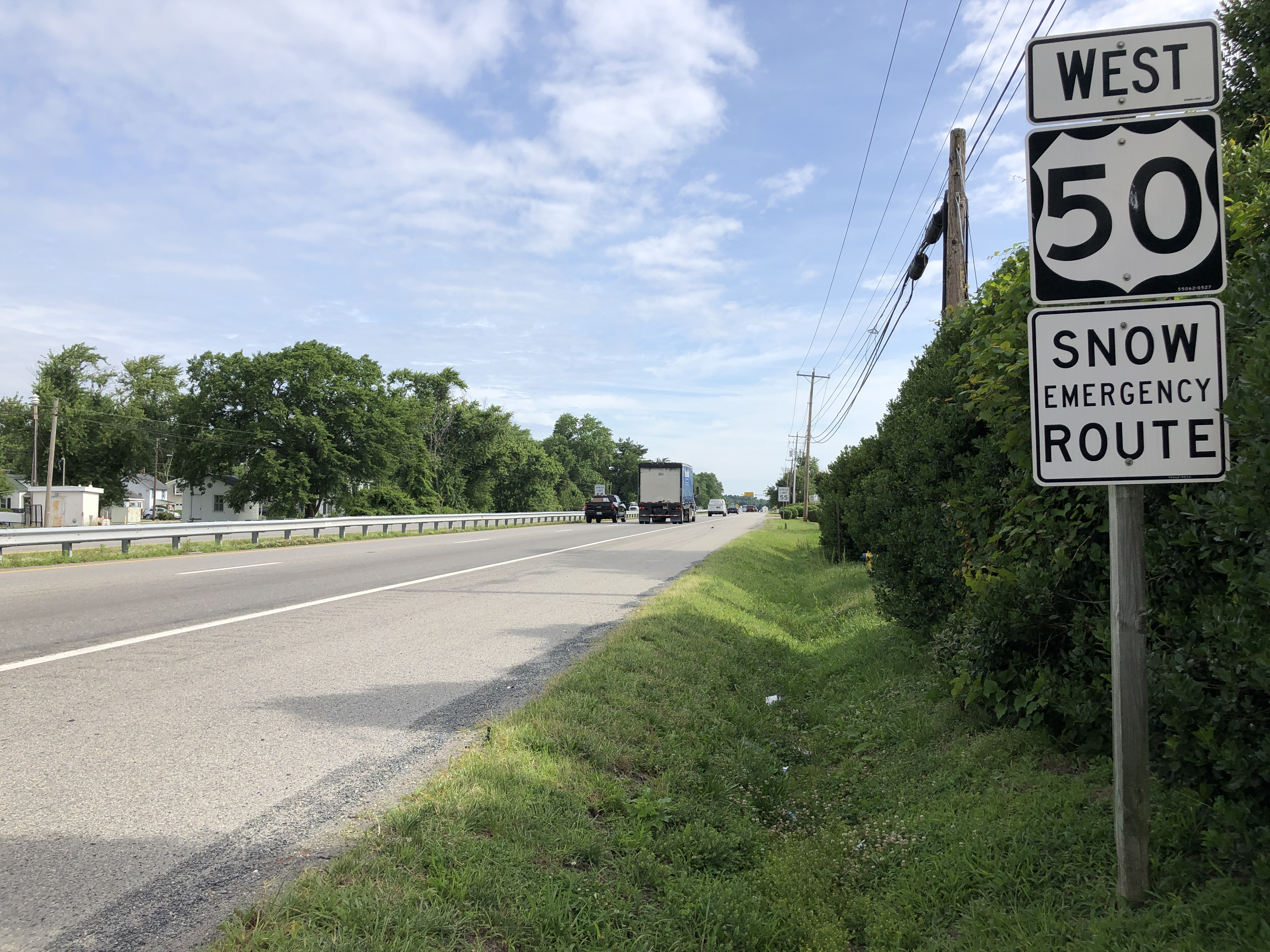
US 50 westbound in Trappe

Transportation to and from Trappe is primarily by road. The main highway serving the town is U.S. Route 50, which links the town to Washington, D.C., and Ocean City. The other state highway serving the town is Maryland Route 565, which follows an old alignment of US 50.

== Notable people ==
- Frank "Home Run" Baker, Hall of Fame third baseman in Major League Baseball; born in Trappe.
- William C. Jason, longest-serving president of Delaware State University
- John Dickinson, Founding Father; born in Trappe.
- Brigadier General John S. D. Eisenhower, US Army Reserve (Ret), former US Ambassador to Belgium (1969–71), career military officer and military historian, lived in Trappe after moving from Kimberton, Pennsylvania until his death on December 21, 2013.
- Robert Mitchum, actor; Mitchum and his family lived in Trappe from 1959 to 1965.
- Nathan ("Uncle Nace") Hopkins; Nathan Hopkins was born in Trappe, Maryland, in 1831. In 1867, he played a pivotal role in the annual celebration of “The Emancipation of the Proclamation” to pay tribute to the end of slavery after Abraham Lincoln’s Emancipation Proclamation on November 1, 1864. Nathan Hopkins led Emancipation Day by organizing the parade, meals, and church service held at Scotts United Methodist Church. Uncle Nace led the parade until his death on March 23, 1900.
- Earl Ravenal, foreign policy analyst.

== Notable place ==
- The Wilderness (Trappe, Maryland) (historic site)
