= Mary Bartlett Dixon =

American nurse and suffragist (1873-1957)

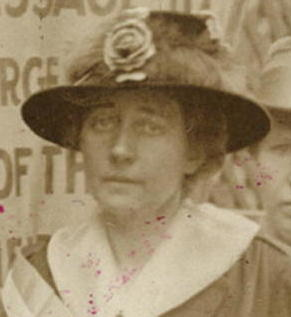
- Born: 1873; Baltimore, Maryland, US
- Died: September 6, 1957 (aged 83–84)
- Education: 1903, Johns Hopkins University School of Nursing
- Spouse: Thomas S. Cullen (m. 1920–1953)

Mary Bartlett Dixon Cullen (1873 – September 6, 1957) was an American nurse and suffragist. She graduated from Johns Hopkins University School of Nursing and helped establish Easton, Maryland's first hospital.

== Early life and education ==
Dixon was born in Baltimore, Maryland, in 1873 to businessman William T. Dixon.

In December 1889, Dixon announced her plan to enroll at the Johns Hopkins University School of Nursing, where her father worked. She was admitted to the Johns Hopkins University School of Nursing due to her father's position with the school. The principal of the School of Nursing, Mary Adelaide Nutting, wanted to reduce the hours women worked, and she believed that by enrolling the president's daughter, he would feel compelled to reduce the hours so she was not overworked. Nutting told Dixon directly that she was only admitted due to her father and not much was expected of her.

== Career ==
In 1906, Judge William R. Martin commissioned Dixon to serve as the treasurer and help establish a hospital in Easton, Maryland. She began the hospital in a rented building, which later burned to the ground. Dixon and Elizabeth Wright Dixon received $43,000 to construct the Memorial Hospital. Together, the woman began a nursing school in 1907. The school was run by volunteers. In 1909, she chaired the special sanitary committee run through the Maryland Association for the Prevention and Relief of Tuberculosis.

Her nursing career did not deter her activism. In October 1909, Dixon was elected chairman of the Woman's Suffrage Association of Maryland. The next year, she became chair of the legislative committee of the Just Government League of Maryland. In 1917, she picketed to bring the passage of the Nineteenth Amendment to grant women the right to vote. After Woodrow Wilson took office, Dixon was part of a group of suffragists who met with him to discuss the suffragist movement.

She died on September 6, 1957.
