= Daniel Martin (politician) =

American politician (1780–1831)

Governor of Maryland
- In office January 13, 1831 – July 11, 1831
- Preceded by: Thomas K. Carroll
- Succeeded by: George Howard
- In office January 15, 1829 – January 15, 1830
- Preceded by: Joseph Kent
- Succeeded by: Thomas K. Carroll

Member of the Maryland House of Delegates
- In office 1813, 1815, 1817, 1819–1820

Personal details
- Born: December 1780 Talbot County, Maryland, U.S.
- Died: July 11, 1831 (aged 50) Talbot County, Maryland, U.S.
- Resting place: Spring Hill Cemetery; Easton, Maryland, U.S.
- Party: National Republican
- Spouse: Mary Clare Maccubbin (m. 1816)
- Children: 5

Daniel Martin (December 1780 – July 11, 1831) served as the 20th governor of the state of Maryland in the United States from January 15, 1829 to January 15, 1830, and from January 13, 1831 until his death. He also served in the Maryland House of Delegates in 1813, 1815, 1817, 1819 and 1820. He was the second governor of Maryland to die in office.

== Early life ==
Daniel Martin was born at "The Wilderness", near Easton in Talbot County, Maryland, in December 1780. He was the son of Nicholas and Hannah (Oldham) Martin, believed to have been a prominent merchant in Talbot County. Daniel entered St. John’s College in Annapolis in 1791, along with his brother Edward, but neither received his degree. Nicholas Martin died in 1807, and by his will, he left "The Wilderness" to Daniel.

== Personal life ==
Martin married Mary Clare Maccubbin in Annapolis on February 6, 1816, and they had five children.

== Career ==
In 1819, Talbot County elected him as one of its representatives to the Maryland House of Delegates. He remained in the Legislature until 1821, following which he retired temporarily from politics. He was elected governor in January 1829, defeating Colonel George E. Martin by a margin of 52 to 38 votes. His term as Governor expired in January 1830 and was replaced by Thomas King Carroll. When the latter’s term expired in January 1831, the Anti-Jacksonians had a majority so it once more chose Martin for governor. Martin received 51 votes, with an additional 32 blanks being recorded. His second term lasted from January to July 1831.

== Death ==
Shortly after he had taken office for the second time, his health began to fail. In the summer of that year, he returned to his Talbot County home to look after his farm. He fell from his horse dead, at noon on July 11, 1831, aged fifty, and was buried in Spring Hill Cemetery in Easton.

The legend that Martin fell dead from his horse exactly at noon after having a premonition for the previous three nights that his deceased mother had appeared to him in a dream telling him that on the third day following her first appearance to him, he would be "called home" at noon is recounted in Tilghman's History of Talbot Co. Md. (vol. one p. 230). An article in the Easton Star Democrat for April 9, 1927 gives a more prosaic account of his death stating that Thomas was taken ill on Friday, July 8, 1831 with "gout of the stomach" and died on Monday, July 11 at 3 o'clock in the afternoon.

== Legacy ==
His home, "The Wilderness," was listed on the National Register of Historic Places in 1974.

Like Thomas Sim Lee and John Henry, Daniel Martin left no portrait.

Political offices
Preceded by Joseph Kent	Governor of Maryland; 1829–1830	Succeeded by Thomas King Carroll
Preceded by Thomas King Carroll	Governor of Maryland; 1831	Succeeded by George Howard
