= Maryland Route 565 =

Highway in Maryland

Maryland Route 565
- Sections of MD 565 highlighted in red, from south to north: MD 565 and MD 565A

Route information
- Maintained by MDSHA
- Existed: 1941–present

MD 565
- Length: 5.18 mi (8.34 km)
- South end: Main Street in Trappe
- North end: US 50 near Easton

MD 565A
- Length: 0.58 mi (930 m)
- South end: MD 322 in Easton
- North end: Washington Street in Easton

Location
- Country: United States
- State: Maryland
- Counties: Talbot

Highway system
- Maryland highway system; Interstate; US; State; Scenic Byways
← MD 564	→ MD 566

Maryland Route 565 (MD 565) is a collection of state highways in the U.S. state of Maryland. These highways are sections of old alignment of U.S. Route 213 (US 213), the predecessor route to US 50, between Trappe and Easton. The two mainline sections of MD 565 run from Trappe to US 50 south of Easton and within the southern part of Easton. MD 565 was assigned to the Trappe–Easton section in the early 1940s when US 213 was moved to a new alignment between Trappe and Peach Blossom Creek in southern Talbot County. MD 565A was designated in the late 1950s in the southern part of Easton and extended north of the downtown area in the mid-1960s. Portions of MD 565 were returned to municipal maintenance in Easton and Trappe in the mid-1980s and late 1990s.

== Route description ==
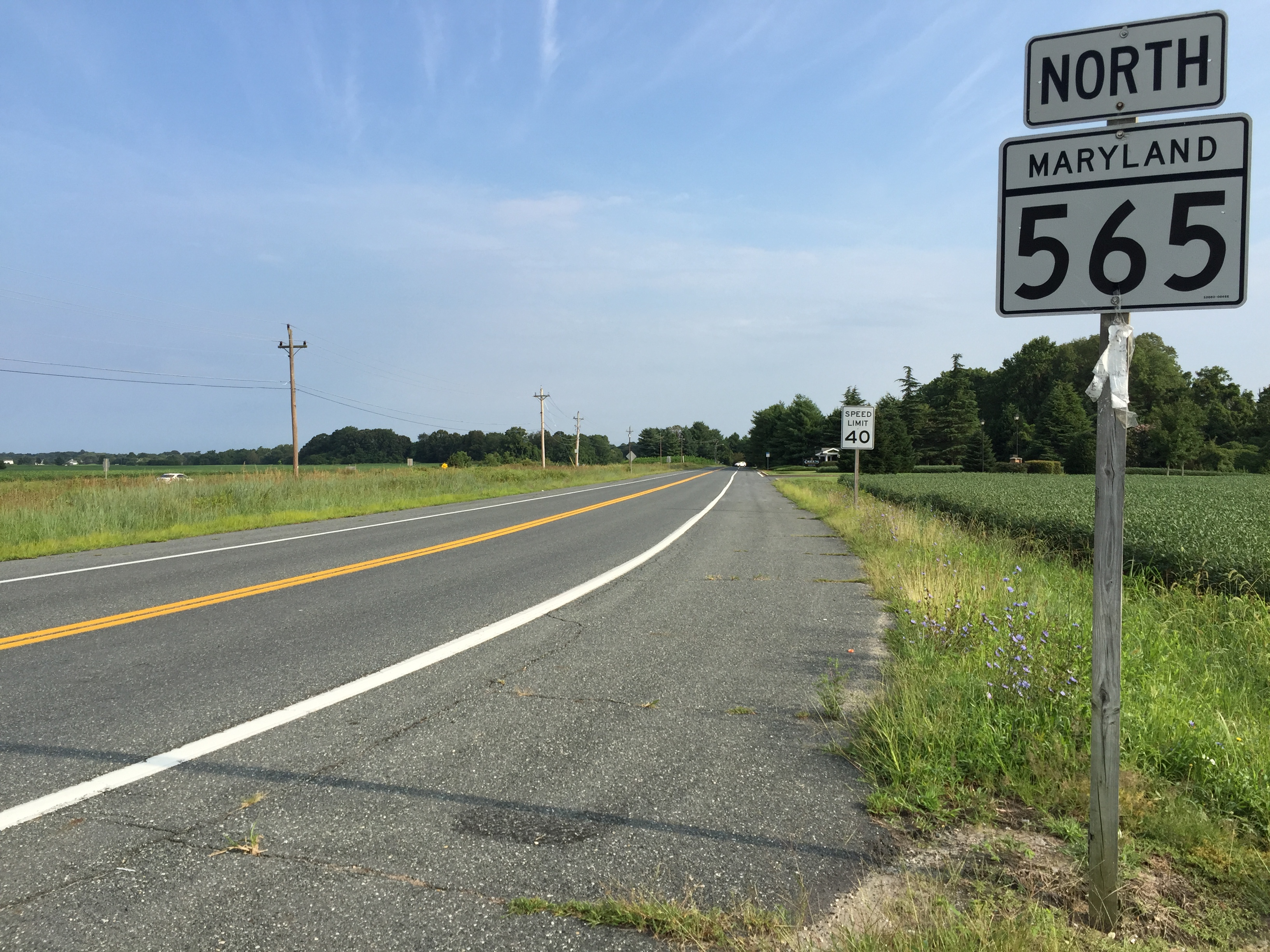
MD 565A northbound past MD 322 in Easton

There are two mainline sections of MD 565:

- MD 565 (without suffix) runs 5.13 miles (8.26 km) from Maple Avenue in Trappe north to US 50 south of Easton.
- MD 565A has a length of 0.58 miles (0.93 km) from MD 322 north to Lee Terrace within Easton.

MD 565 begins as Main Street in the center of the town of Trappe. Main Street continues south 0.59 miles (0.95 km) from Maple Avenue as a municipal street to a junction with US 50. The state highway heads north as a two-lane undivided road and its name changes to Easton Trappe Road on leaving the town after passing White Marsh Road. A short distance north of Llandaff Road near the hamlet of Llandaff a short distance south of Peach Blossom Creek, MD 565 turns sharply to the east and reaches its northern terminus at US 50 (Ocean Gateway).

MD 565A, which is known as Washington Street, begins at an intersection with MD 322 (Easton Parkway) a short distance north of MD 322's southern intersection with US 50. After crossing Paper Mill Pond, the two-lane undivided state highway reaches its northern terminus at Lee Terrace. Washington Street, which was once part of a longer MD 565A, continues north as a municipal street into downtown Easton.

== History ==
MD 565 was assigned to the old alignment of US 213 between Trappe and Peach Blossom Creek south of Easton by 1946 after US 213 was moved to a new alignment, presently used by US 50, in 1941. MD 565A was assigned to Washington Street south of MD 33 in 1958. MD 565A was extended north to Easton Parkway in 1965 when MD 33 was assigned to the northern part of Easton Parkway. The MD 565A designation was removed from Washington Street north of downtown Easton in 1985. The remainder of MD 565A north of Lee Terrace was transferred to the town of Easton in 1999. The portion of Main Street south of MD 565's present southern terminus was transferred to the town of Trappe in 1999.

== Junction list ==
=== MD 565 ===
The entire route is in Talbot County.

Location	mi	km	Destinations	Notes
Trappe	0.00	0.00	Main Street south / Maple Avenue	Southern terminus
	5.18	8.34	US 50 (Ocean Gateway) – Easton, Cambridge	Northern terminus
1.000 mi = 1.609 km; 1.000 km = 0.621 mi

=== MD 565A ===
The entire route is in Easton, Talbot County.

mi	km	Destinations	Notes
0.00	0.00	MD 322 (Easton Parkway) to US 50 – Cambridge, Bay Bridge	Southern terminus
0.58	0.93	Washington Street north / Lee Terrace east	Northern terminus
1.000 mi = 1.609 km; 1.000 km = 0.621 mi

== Auxiliary route ==
MD 565B is the designation for an unnamed 0.14-mile (0.23 km) service road that continues straight, to serve as a driveway for an auto dealership, from MD 565 just before that highway's northern terminus at US 50.
