= Thomas King Carroll =

American politician (1793-1873)

Thomas Carroll
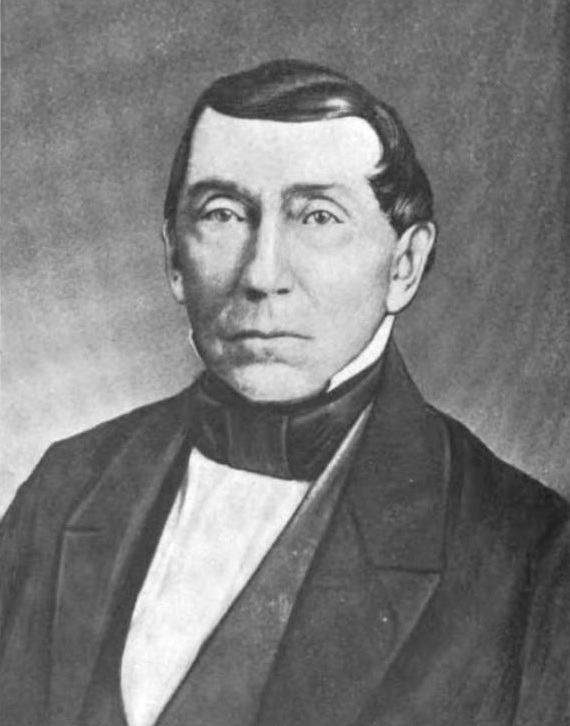

21st Governor of Maryland
- In office January 15, 1830 – January 13, 1831
- Preceded by: Daniel Martin
- Succeeded by: Daniel Martin

Member of the Maryland House of Delegates
- In office 1816–1817

Personal details
- Born: Thomas King Carroll; April 29, 1793 Somerset County, Maryland, U.S.
- Died: October 3, 1873 (aged 80) Dorchester County, Maryland, U.S.
- Party: Democratic
- Spouse: Julianna Stevenson

Thomas King Carroll (April 29, 1793 – October 3, 1873) served as the 21st governor of the state of Maryland in the United States from 1830 to 1831. He also served as a judge, and in the Maryland House of Delegates from 1816 to 1817.

== Biography ==
He was born at Kingston Hall, in Somerset County, Maryland on April 29, 1793, the son of Col. Henry James Carroll and Elizabeth (Barnes) King. He attended Charlotte Hall School, then in 1802, he entered Washington Academy in Somerset County where he remained for the next eight years. He then became a junior at the University of Pennsylvania and graduated in 1811. Carroll studied law, first in the office of Ephraim King Wilson in Snow Hill, then under Robert Goodloe Harper in Baltimore. On June 23, 1814, he had married Julianna Stevenson and they had nine children, one of whom was Anna Ella Carroll (1815–1893).

Following his father's death, he returned to Kingston Hall where he became the manager of the family's estate. Shortly after, he became active in the political affairs of that county. During the sessions of 1816 and 1817, Carroll was elected without opposition to the House of Delegates. He was a member of the Levy Court of Somerset County between July 1825 and February 1826, when he was appointed Judge of the Orphans’ Court. He was serving in that office when he was elected Governor in December 1829. He had also served as a Senatorial elector in 1821 and 1826.

Carroll was elected governor on January 4, 1830, defeating incumbent Daniel Martin by a vote of 50 to 43. While governor, he joined in the movement to improve the collegiate department of the University of Maryland, as well as that of advocating a statewide public school system. Other accomplishments during his tenure included aiding veterans of the Revolutionary War in their efforts to receive pensions and other benefits from then federal government, and lobbying for a restructuring of the state penal system, arguing that “the object should be. . . to punish crime—to deter by example, and to produce reform.” He lost reelection to Martin, and retired at the end of his one-year term. Carroll is the only Maryland Governor with the same predecessor and successor.

Carroll retired to Kingston Hall at the close of his administration and lived there until 1840, when he moved to Dorchester County, Maryland, residing on a large estate near Church Creek. When Zachary Taylor became president in 1849, he appointed Carroll Naval Officer of the Port of Baltimore. (Naval Officers, Collectors and other appointees were responsible for assessing and collecting customs duties at U.S. ports, and for levying fines on those who attempted to avoid duties. They were compensated based on a percentage of the duties and fines collected, making the positions highly-sought-after political appointments.)

He died at his home Walnut Landing, in Dorchester County on October 3, 1873, and was buried in Old Trinity Church Cemetery following Masonic burial services.

== See also ==
- Carroll family

Political offices
Preceded by Daniel Martin	Governor of Maryland; 1830–1831	Succeeded by Daniel Martin
