= Talbot County Public Schools =

Public school district in Maryland, US

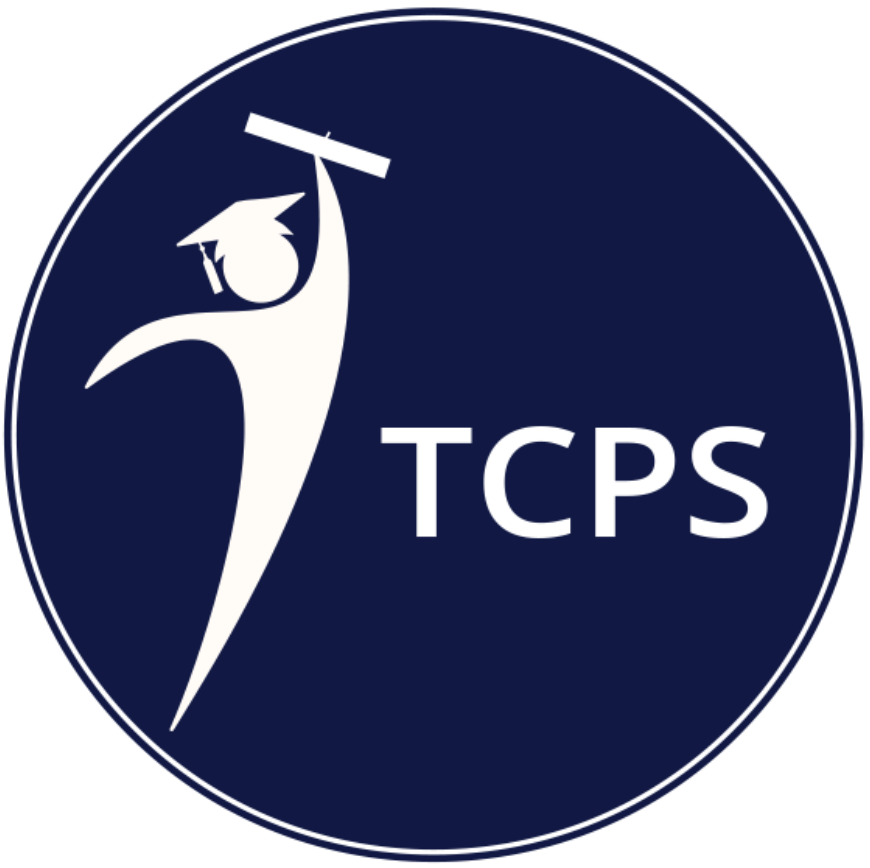

Address
- 12 Magnolia Street Easton, Talbot, Maryland, 21601; United States
- Coordinates: 38°46′54″N 76°04′07″W

District information
- Type: Public
- Grades: Pre-K through 12 (including Head Start)
- Established: October 1723; 302 years ago
- Superintendent: Dr. Sharon M. Pepukayi
- School board: Talbot County Board of Education
- Chair of the board: President: Emily Jackson Vice President: Candace Henry
- Governing agency: Maryland State Department of Education
- Schools: 8
- Budget: $1.72 million (FY 2025)
- NCES District ID: 2400630

Students and staff
- Students: 4,523 (2022-23)
- Teachers: 334 (2022-23)
- Staff: 347 (2022-23)
- Student–teacher ratio: 13.5:1 (2022-23)

Other information
- Schedule: M-F except for county holidays
- Website: tcps.k12.md.us

Talbot County Public Schools (TCPS) is a public school district that serves Talbot County, Maryland. With 8 schools, it is one of the smallest school districts in the state of Maryland. TCPS receives nearly a third of the county's budget—35.2% in 2024.

As of July 2022, the superintendent of the district is Sharon M. Pepukayi, Ed.D. The board of education includes two student members, appointed by high school administrators, who hold a non-voting role; in 2024–25, the student board members are Brynn Lizewski and Gabriella Streaker.

The district covers the entire county.

== History ==
=== 21st century ===
In 2005, Talbot County became the first Maryland school system to implement a district-wide one-to-one laptop initiative, when it assigned a new laptop computer to each incoming 9th grader. Over the next four years, the system continued providing 9th graders with laptop computers until all high school students had school-issued devices.

In 2014, Talbot County Public Schools made national headlines due to a lawsuit challenging disciplinary procedures after an unconstitutional search of two students' bags. In 2012, the Maryland State Board of Education unanimously reversed the school board's decision to punish the students, expuging their disciplinary records.

In July 2017, Superintendent Kelly Griffith recommended consolidating Tilghman Elementary School with St. Michaels Elementary School for the 2018–2019 school year due to declining enrollment and underuse of teachers and resources. The school did not close and has become one of the district's highest-performing elementary schools.

In 2018, Talbot County Public Schools made national headlines due to a lawsuit challenging district policies that refused to allow a male transgender student to use the boys locker room and bathrooms at St. Michaels Middle/High School. A U.S. District Court judge ruled that barring transgender students from sex segregated school restrooms or locker rooms that align with their gender identity is a violation Title IX and the Equal Protection Clause. The case settlement gave transgender students attending Talbot County schools the permanent right to use the bathrom or locker room consistent with their gender identity.

In 2023, Easton High School science teacher Lauren Rose was recognized by the Environmental Protection Agency (EPA) as one of 9 recipients nationally to win the Presidential Innovation Award for Environmental Educators (PIAEE). This was the first time that a TCPS educator ever received a national award.

== Governance and budget ==
The board of education has seven elected members, plus one student representative appointed by each of the county's high schools.

The board's current members are:

Name	District	Term ends
Amy Dodson	District 3	2026
Anna Howie	District 5	2024
Candace Henry	District 2, Vice President	2024
Deborah Bridges	District 7	2026
Dyshekia Strawberry	District 1	2026
Emily Jackson	District 4, President	2026
Mary Wheeler	District 6	2024
Brynn Lizewski	Student member	2025
Gabriella Streaker	Student member	2025
Sharon M. Pepukayi	Superintendent	N/A

== Schools ==
TCPS consists of 8 schools: 5 elementary schools, 1 middle school, one middle-high school, and one high school.

TCPS publishes school data annually. Its "TCPS at a Glance" document provides information about enrollment, staffing, facilities, services and programs, university acceptances, strategic priorities, new district initiatives, and expenditures.

The district has 1 LEED Gold school, a designation that recognizes buildings that are efficient, cost-effective, and better for occupants and the environment.

=== Elementary schools ===
Name	Location	Principal	Mascot
Chapel District Elementary School	Cordova	Kari Clow	Cheetahs
Easton Elementary School	Easton	Lisa Devaric	Tigers
St. Michaels Elementary School	St. Michaels	Indra Bullock	Saints
Tilghman Elementary School	Tilghman	Corey Devaric	Tigers
White Marsh Elementary School	Trappe	Kim Seidel	Dolphins

=== Secondary schools ===
Name	Location	Principal	Mascot
Easton Middle School	Easton	Kelly Murdoch	Panthers
Easton High School	Easton	Sherry Spurry	Warriors
St. Michaels Middle/High School	St. Michaels	Theresa Vener	Saints

== Notable alumni ==
Prominent graduates or former attendees of the school system include:

- Casey Cep — author, journalist
- Chris Moore — film producer
- Cynthia C. Morton — geneticist
- Frank Robinson, Jr. — athlete
- Harold Baines, former Major League Baseball player
- James Rouse — developer, philanthropist
- Jawann Kelley-Gibson — athlete, coach
- Jean Louisa Kelly — actress
- Jeannie Haddaway-Riccio - former member of the Maryland House of Delegates
- John "Home Run" Baker — former Major League Baseball player
- Richard F. Colburn — former member of the Maryland State Senate
