= The Artists' & Writers' Cookbook =

1961 cookbook

- Subject: Cookbook
- Publisher: Contact Editions
- Publication date: 1961
- Pages: 288 pp.
- OCLC: 1816499

The Artists' & Writers' Cookbook is a 1961 cookbook with 220 recipes and 30 courses provided by famous writers and artists. Editors Beryl Barr and Barbara Turner Sachs asked contributors to submit cooking-related stories or favorite family recipes. The artists and writers responded with varying levels of seriousness, with some "using the cookbook as a canvas for wit and creative deviation". Of the cookbook's 150 contributors, 61 were novelists, 55 were painters, 19 were poets, and 15 were sculptors.

The Artists' & Writers' Cookbook was designed by Nicolas Sidjakov. Engravings from the 19th century were used to illustrate the cookbook, as were drawings from various contributors including Alexandre Istrati, Robert Osborn, and Marcel Duchamp.

== Contents ==
The forward for The Artists' & Writers' Cookbook was provided by Alice B. Toklas, who describes the cookbook as enchanting, asserting that "the writers write as they write. The painters write as they paint." In her introduction, Toklas provides an omelette aurore recipe that was sent by Victor Hugo to George Sand. She also includes recipes for fillet of sole with lobster sauce, gougère, and a Burgundian pastry.

William Styron provided a six-page-long recipe for Southern fried chicken, a dish which he describes as the "most put-upon, abused and generally misunderstood of all indigenous American culinary triumphs". Sculptor Elisabeth Frink contributed a recipe for roast lemon chicken with numerous steps using lemons, including stuffing the bird with lemon pieces and using multiple applications of lemon juice. For his entry, writer John Keats provided an extensive breakfast menu including cider-flavored cauliflower, toasted French bread with garlic butter, and sausage prepared in wine. He encouraged the reader to "breakfast like a peasant, and dine like a viscount." Man Ray's contribution was a "Menu for a Dadaist Day" that includes ball bearings and children's blocks.

The Artists' & Writers' Cookbook influenced subsequent cookbooks and inspired a 2016 cookbook compiled by Natalie Eve Garrett with the same name and concept.

== Selected contributors ==
- Conrad Aiken
- Louis Auchincloss
- Sybille Bedford
- Paul Bowles
- Kay Boyle
- Malcolm Bradbury
- James Brooks
- Pearl Buck
- Erskine Caldwell
- Caresse Crosby
- Isak Dinesen
- Marcel Duchamp – Steak tartare
- Lawrence Durrell
- Max Eastman
- Sam Francis
- Helen Frankenthaler
- Elisabeth Frink – Roast lemon chicken
- Harry Golden
- Robert Graves – Sevillian plum conserve
- S.I. Hayakawa
- Lillian Hellman – Shrimp creole
- Derek Hill
- Burl Ives
- James Jones
- John Keats
- John Knowles
- Harper Lee – Cracklin' cornbread
- Denise Levertov
- James Michener
- Marianne Moore
- Richard Olney
- Kenneth Patchen
- Katherine Anne Porter – Fresh vegetable borscht
- Man Ray
- Milton Resnick
- Anya Seton Chase
- Georges Simenon
- Upton Sinclair
- Pierre Soulages
- Irving Stone
- William Styron – Southern fried chicken
- Mark Tobey
- Alexandra Tolstaya – Russian mint cookies
- Louis Untermeyer
- Sloan Wilson
