= The Land of Sweet Forever =

2025 posthumous short story collection by Harper Lee

- Cover, similar in design to the first edition of To Kill a Mockingbird.
- Author: Harper Lee
- Language: English
- Genre: Fiction
- Publication date: October 2025
- Publication place: United States
- ISBN: 9781529155662

The Land of Sweet Forever is a collection of short stories by American author Harper Lee, published posthumously on October 21, 2025, by HarperCollins. The book features eight previously unpublished short stories discovered after her 2016 death in an apartment she owned in New York City. Eight additional pieces, which appeared in different publications between the years 1961 and 2006, are also included. The book's introduction is by Casey Cep, the author of Furious Hours: Murder, Fraud and the Last Trial of Harper Lee.

The eight newly released stories were written after Lee dropped out of the University of Alabama School of Law and prior to the success of her novels Go Set a Watchman and To Kill a Mockingbird at a time when the young author was submitting short fiction pieces to publishing outlets. In 2024, her estate approved these stories for publication along with eight previously published pieces that were written after the acclaim of To Kill a Mockingbird, when Lee's subsequent work was more readily published.

== Contents ==
Stories

- The Water Tank
- The Binoculars
- The Pinking Shears
- A Roomful of Kibble
- The Viewers and the Viewed
- This is Show Business?
- The Cat's Meow
- The Land of Sweet Forever

Essays and Miscellaneous Pieces

- Love—in Other Words
- Crackling Bread
- Christmas to Me
- Gregory Peck
- When Children Discover America
- Truman Capote
- Romance and High Adventure
- A Letter from Harper Lee

== Reception ==
Reviewing the book for The Guardian, Sandra Newman wrote that "like most such books, it has little to offer to those who aren't diehard fans." Newman described the stories as "badly underdeveloped," saying: "The young Lee seems to have little sense of what a story is. On the positive side, there is already wit and charisma in the voice." She concluded that "if we regard this book as literature, it is an unqualified failure. But it's more properly seen – and will surely be read – for the light it sheds on Lee’s life. As such, it's obliquely fascinating."
