= Schisler =

Schisler is a surname. Notable people with the surname include:

- Gale Schisler (1933-2020), American politician
- Kenneth D. Schisler (born 1969), American politician
