= Easton High School (disambiguation) =

Easton High School is a high school in Easton, Maryland.

Easton High School may also refer to:

- Warren Easton Charter High School in New Orleans, Louisiana
- Easton Area High School in Easton, Pennsylvania
