= Harper Lee =

American novelist (1926–2016)

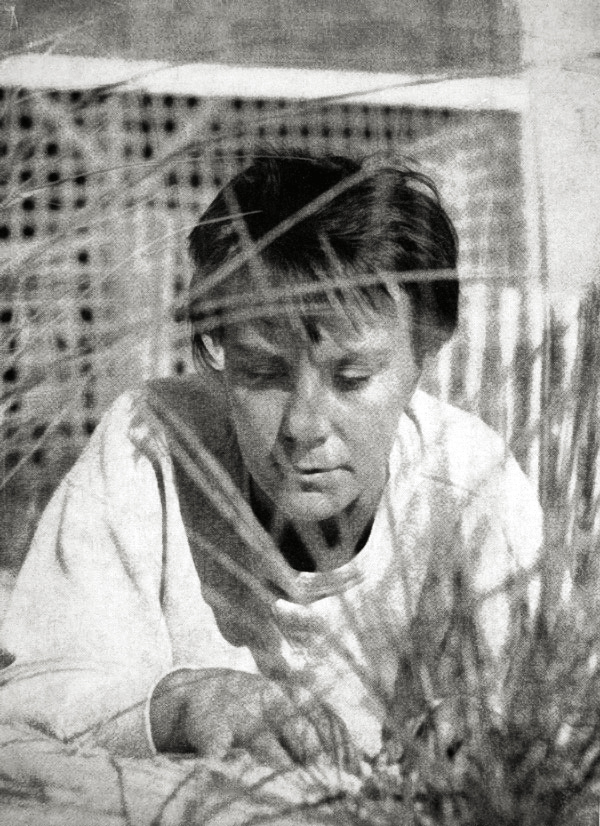
- Portrait by Truman Capote, 1960
- Born: Nelle Harper Lee; April 28, 1926; Monroeville, Alabama, U.S.
- Died: February 19, 2016 (aged 89); Monroeville, Alabama, U.S.
- Education: Huntingdon College; University of Alabama
- Occupation: Novelist
- Writing career
- Period: 1960–2016
- Genres: Literature; fiction
- Notable works: To Kill a Mockingbird (1960); Go Set a Watchman (2015)
- Movement: Southern Gothic

Nelle Harper Lee (April 28, 1926 – February 19, 2016) was an American novelist whose 1960 novel To Kill a Mockingbird won the 1961 Pulitzer Prize and became a classic of modern American literature. She assisted her close friend Truman Capote in his research for the book In Cold Blood (1966). An earlier draft of Mockingbird, set at a later date, Go Set a Watchman, was published in July 2015 as a sequel. A collection of her short stories and essays, The Land of Sweet Forever, was posthumously published on October 21, 2025.

The plot and characters of To Kill a Mockingbird are loosely based on Lee's observations of her family and neighbors in Monroeville, Alabama, as well as a childhood event that occurred near her hometown in 1936. The novel deals with racist attitudes and the irrationality of adult attitudes towards race and class in the Deep South of the 1930s as depicted through the eyes of two children.

Lee received numerous accolades and honorary degrees, including the Presidential Medal of Freedom in 2007, which was awarded for her contribution to literature.

== Early life ==
Nelle Harper Lee was born on April 28, 1926, in Monroeville, Alabama, the youngest of four children of Frances Cunningham (née Finch) and Amasa Coleman Lee. Her parents chose her middle name, Harper, to honor pediatrician Dr. William W. Harper, of Selma, who had saved the life of her sister Louise. Her first name, Nelle, was her grandmother's name spelled backwards and the name she used, whereas Harper Lee was primarily her pen name. Lee's mother was a homemaker; her father was a former newspaper editor, businessman, and lawyer, who also served in the Alabama State Legislature from 1926 to 1938. Through her father, she was related to Confederate general Robert E. Lee and a member of the prominent Lee family. Before A. C. Lee became a title lawyer, he once defended two black men accused of murdering a white storekeeper. Both clients, a father and son, were hanged.

Lee's three siblings were Alice Finch Lee (1911–2014), Louise Lee Conner (1916–2009), and Edwin Lee (1920–1951). Although Lee remained in contact with her significantly older sisters throughout their lives, only her brother was close enough in age to play with, though she bonded with Truman Capote (1924–1984), who visited family in Monroeville during the summers from 1928 until 1934.

While enrolled at Monroe County High School, Lee developed an interest in English literature, in part through her teacher Gladys Watson, who became her mentor. After graduating high school in 1944, like her eldest sister Alice Finch Lee, Lee attended the then all-female Huntingdon College in Montgomery for a year, then transferred to the University of Alabama in Tuscaloosa, where she studied law for several years. Lee also wrote for the university newspaper (The Crimson White) and a humor magazine (Rammer Jammer), but to her father's great disappointment, she left one semester short of completing the credit hours for a degree. In the summer of 1948, Lee attended a summer school program, "European Civilisation in the Twentieth Century", at Oxford University in England, financed by her father, who hoped—in vain, as it turned out—that the experience would make her more interested in her legal studies in Tuscaloosa.

== To Kill a Mockingbird ==
I never expected any sort of success with Mockingbird. I was hoping for a quick and merciful death at the hands of the reviewers, but at the same time I sort of hoped someone would like it enough to give me encouragement. Public encouragement. I hoped for a little, as I said, but I got rather a whole lot, and in some ways this was just about as frightening as the quick, merciful death I'd expected.

— Harper Lee, quoted in Newquist, 1964

In 1949, Lee moved to New York City and took jobs—first at a bookstore, then as an airline reservation agent—while writing in her spare time. After publishing several long stories, Lee found an agent in November 1956; Maurice Crain would become a friend until his death decades later. The following month, at Michael Brown's East 50th Street townhouse, friends gave Lee a gift of a year's wages with a note: "You have one year off from your job to write whatever you please. Merry Christmas."

=== Origin ===
The first edition cover for To Kill a Mockingbird

In the spring of 1957, a 31-year-old Lee delivered the manuscript for Go Set a Watchman to Crain to send out to publishers, including the now-defunct J. B. Lippincott Company, which eventually bought it. At Lippincott, the novel fell into the hands of Tay Hohoff. Hohoff was impressed. "[T]he spark of the true writer flashed in every line", she would later recount in a corporate history of Lippincott. But as Hohoff saw it, the manuscript was by no means fit for publication. It was, as she described it, "more a series of anecdotes than a fully conceived novel". During the next couple of years, she led Lee from one draft to the next until the book finally achieved its finished form and was retitled To Kill a Mockingbird.

Like many unpublished authors, Lee was unsure of her talents. "I was a first-time writer, so I did as I was told," Lee said in a statement in 2015 about the evolution from Watchman to Mockingbird. Hohoff later described the process in Lippincott's corporate history: "After a couple of false starts, the story-line, interplay of characters, and fall of emphasis grew clearer, and with each revision—there were many minor changes as the story grew in strength and in her own vision of it—the true stature of the novel became evident." (In 1978, Lippincott was acquired by Harper & Row, which published Watchman in 2015.) Hohoff described the give and take between author and editor: "When she disagreed with a suggestion, we talked it out, sometimes for hours" ... "And sometimes she came around to my way of thinking, sometimes I to hers, sometimes the discussion would open up an entirely new line of country."

External videos
- After Words interview with Shields on Mockingbird: A Portrait of Harper Lee, July 11, 2015, C-SPAN

One winter night, as Charles J. Shields recounts in Mockingbird: A Portrait of Harper Lee, Lee threw her manuscript out her window and into the snow, before calling Hohoff in tears. Shields recollected that "Tay told her to march outside immediately and pick up the pages".

When the novel was finally ready, the author opted to use the name "Harper Lee" rather than risk having her first name Nelle be misidentified as "Nellie".

Published July 11, 1960, To Kill a Mockingbird was an immediate bestseller and won great critical acclaim, including the Pulitzer Prize for Fiction in 1961. It remains a bestseller, with more than 40 million copies in print. In 1999, it was voted "Best Novel of the Century" in a poll by the Library Journal.

=== Autobiographical details in the novel ===
Like Lee, the tomboy Scout in the novel is the daughter of a respected small-town Alabama attorney. Scout's friend, Dill Harris, was inspired by Lee's childhood friend and neighbor, Truman Capote; Lee, in turn, is the model for a character in Capote's first novel, Other Voices, Other Rooms, published in 1948. Although the plot of Lee's novel involves an unsuccessful legal defense similar to one undertaken by her attorney father, the 1931 landmark Scottsboro Boys interracial rape case may also have helped to shape Lee's social conscience.

While Lee herself downplayed autobiographical parallels in the book, Truman Capote, mentioning the character Boo Radley in To Kill a Mockingbird, described details he considered autobiographical: "In my original version of Other Voices, Other Rooms I had that same man living in the house that used to leave things in the trees, and then I took that out. He was a real man, and he lived just down the road from us. We used to go and get those things out of the trees. Everything she wrote about it is absolutely true. But you see, I take the same thing and transfer it into some Gothic dream, done in an entirely different way."

== After To Kill a Mockingbird ==
=== Middle years ===
For 40 years, Lee lived part-time at 433 East 82nd Street in Manhattan, near her childhood friend Capote. His first novel, the semi-autobiographical Other Voices, Other Rooms, had been published in 1948; a decade later Capote published Breakfast at Tiffany's, which became a film, a musical, and two stage plays. As the To Kill a Mockingbird manuscript went into publication production in 1959, Lee accompanied Capote to Holcomb, Kansas, to help him research what they thought would be an article on a small town's response to the murder of a farmer and his family. Capote would expand the material into his best-selling book, In Cold Blood, serialized beginning in September 1965 and published in 1966. Her friendship with Capote, however, would suffer and peter out eventually in the wake of the worldwide success of Lee's novel, which Capote had troubles coming to terms with.

After To Kill a Mockingbird was released, Lee began a whirlwind of publicity tours, which she found difficult given her penchant for privacy and many interviewers' characterization of the work as a "coming-of-age story". Racial tensions in the South had increased prior to the book's release. Students at North Carolina A&T University staged the first sit-in months before publication. As the book became a best seller, Freedom Riders arrived in Alabama and were beaten in Anniston and Birmingham. Meanwhile, To Kill a Mockingbird won the 1961 Pulitzer Prize for Fiction and the 1961 Brotherhood Award from the National Conference of Christians and Jews and became a Reader's Digest Book Club condensed selection and an alternate Book of the Month Club selection.

Lee helped with the adaptation of the book to the 1962 Academy Award–winning screenplay by Horton Foote, and said: "I think it is one of the best translations of a book to film ever made." Gregory Peck won an Oscar for his portrayal of Atticus Finch, the father of the novel's narrator, Scout. The families became close; Peck's grandson, Harper Peck Voll, is named after her.

From the time of the publication of To Kill a Mockingbird until her death in 2016, Lee granted almost no requests for interviews or public appearances and, with the exception of a few short essays, published nothing further until 2015. She worked on a follow-up novel—The Long Goodbye—but eventually filed it away unfinished.

Lee assumed significant care responsibilities for her aging father, who was thrilled with her success, and who even began signing autographs as "Atticus Finch". His health worsened and he died in Alabama on April 15, 1962. Lee decided to spend more time in New York City as she mourned. Over the decades, her friend Capote had adopted a decadent lifestyle, which contrasted with Lee's preference for a quiet, more anonymous existence. Lee preferred to visit friends at their homes (though she came to distance herself from those who criticized her drinking), and also made unannounced appearances at libraries or other gatherings, particularly in Monroeville.

In January 1966, President Lyndon B. Johnson appointed Lee to the National Council on the Arts.

Lee also realized that her book had become controversial, particularly with segregationists and other opponents of the civil rights movement. In 1966, Lee wrote a letter to the editor in response to the attempts of a Richmond, Virginia, area school board to ban To Kill a Mockingbird as "immoral literature":

Surely it is plain to the simplest intelligence that To Kill a Mockingbird spells out in words of seldom more than two syllables a code of honor and conduct, Christian in its ethic, that is the heritage of all Southerners. To hear that the novel is "immoral" has made me count the years between now and 1984, for I have yet to come across a better example of doublethink.

James J. Kilpatrick, editor of The Richmond News Leader, started the Beadle Bumble fund to pay fines for victims of what he termed "despots on the bench". He built the fund using contributions from readers and later used it to defend books as well as people. After the board in Richmond ordered schools to dispose of all copies of To Kill a Mockingbird, Kilpatrick wrote, "A more moral novel scarcely could be imagined." In the name of the Beadle Bumble fund, he then offered free copies to children who wrote in, and by the end of the first week, he had given away 81 copies.

Beginning in 1978, with her sisters' encouragement, Lee returned to Alabama and began a book about an Alabama serial murderer and the trial of his killer in Alexander City, under the working title The Reverend, but also put it aside when she was not satisfied. When Lee attended the 1983 Alabama History and Heritage Festival in Eufaula, Alabama, as her sister had arranged, she presented the essay "Romance and High Adventure".

=== 2005–2014 ===
In March 2005, Lee arrived in Philadelphia—her first trip to the city since signing with publisher Lippincott in 1960—to receive the inaugural ATTY Award for positive depictions of attorneys in the arts from the Spector Gadon & Rosen Foundation. At the urging of Peck's widow, Veronique Peck, Lee traveled by train from Monroeville to Los Angeles in 2005 to accept the Los Angeles Public Library Literary Award. She also attended luncheons for students who had written essays based on her work, held annually at the University of Alabama. On May 21, 2006, she accepted an honorary degree from the University of Notre Dame, where graduating seniors saluted her with copies of To Kill a Mockingbird during the ceremony.

On May 7, 2006, Lee wrote a letter to Oprah Winfrey (published in O, The Oprah Magazine in July 2006) about her love of books as a child and her dedication to the written word: "Now, 75 years later in an abundant society where people have laptops, cell phones, iPods and minds like empty rooms, I still plod along with books."

While attending an August 20, 2007, ceremony inducting four members into the Alabama Academy of Honor, Lee declined an invitation to address the audience, saying: "Well, it's better to be silent than to be a fool."

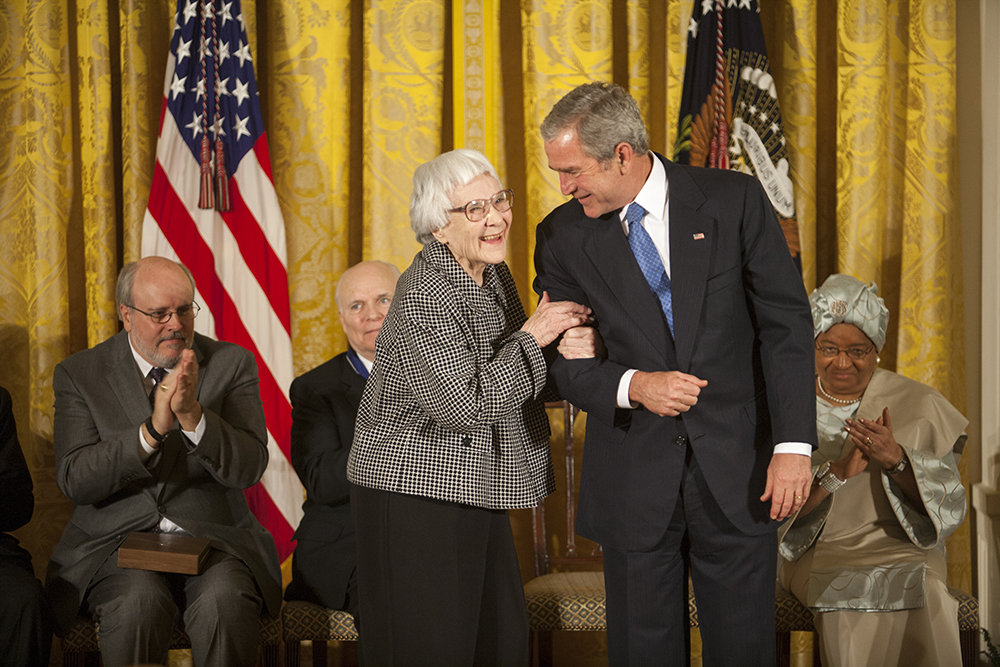
Lee being awarded the Presidential Medal of Freedom, November 5, 2007

On November 5, 2007, George W. Bush presented Lee with the Presidential Medal of Freedom. This is the highest civilian award in the United States and recognizes individuals who have made "an especially meritorious contribution to the security or national interests of the United States, world peace, cultural or other significant public or private endeavors".

In a 2009 correspondence with Ed Walsh of the Bay Area Reporter, Lee addressed rumors that she was a lesbian, stating that she was "not even remotely gay."

In 2010, President Barack Obama awarded Lee the National Medal of Arts, the highest award given by the United States government for "outstanding contributions to the excellence, growth, support and availability of the arts".

In a 2011 interview with an Australian newspaper, Rev. Dr. Thomas Lane Butts said Lee was living in an assisted-living facility, was using a wheelchair, partially blind and deaf, and suffering from memory loss. Butts also shared that Lee told him why she never wrote again: "Two reasons: one, I wouldn't go through the pressure and publicity I went through with To Kill a Mockingbird for any amount of money. Second, I have said what I wanted to say, and I will not say it again."

On May 3, 2013, Lee filed a lawsuit in the United States District Court to regain the copyright to To Kill a Mockingbird, seeking unspecified damages from a son-in-law of her former literary agent and related entities. Lee claimed that the man "engaged in a scheme to dupe" her into assigning him the copyright on the book in 2007 when her hearing and eyesight were in decline, and she was residing in an assisted-living facility after suffering a stroke. In September 2013, attorneys for both sides announced a settlement of the lawsuit.

In February 2014, Lee settled a lawsuit against the Monroe County Heritage Museum for an undisclosed amount. The suit alleged that the museum had used her name and the title To Kill a Mockingbird to promote itself and to sell souvenirs without her consent. Lee's attorneys had filed a trademark application on August 19, 2013, to which the museum filed an opposition. This prompted Lee's attorney to file a lawsuit on October 15 that same year, "which takes issue the museum's website and gift shop, which it accuses of 'palming off its goods', including T-shirts, coffee mugs other various trinkets with Mockingbird brands."

=== 2015: Go Set a Watchman ===
According to Lee's lawyer Tonja Carter, following an initial meeting to appraise Lee's assets in 2011, she re-examined Lee's safe-deposit box in 2014 and found the manuscript for Go Set a Watchman. After contacting Lee and reading the manuscript, she passed it on to Lee's agent Andrew Nurnberg. On February 3, 2015, it was announced that HarperCollins would publish Go Set a Watchman, which includes versions of many of the characters in To Kill a Mockingbird. According to a HarperCollins press release, it was originally thought that the Watchman manuscript was lost. According to Nurnberg, Mockingbird was originally intended to be the first book of a trilogy: "They discussed publishing Mockingbird first, Watchman last, and a shorter connecting novel between the two."

Jonathan Mahler's account in The New York Times of how Watchman was only ever really considered to be the first draft of Mockingbird makes this assertion seem unlikely. Evidence where the same passages exist in both books, in many cases word for word, also further refutes this assertion.

The book was met with controversy when it was published in July 2015 as a sequel to To Kill a Mockingbird. Although it had been confirmed as a first draft of the latter with many narrative incongruities, it was repackaged and released as a completely separate work. The book is set some 20 years after the time period depicted in Mockingbird, when Scout returns as an adult from New York to visit her father in Maycomb, Alabama. It alludes to Scout's view of her father, Atticus Finch, as the moral compass ("watchman") of Maycomb, and, according to the publisher, how she finds upon her return to Maycomb, that she "is forced to grapple with issues both personal and political as she tries to understand her father's attitude toward society and her own feelings about the place where she was born and spent her childhood."

Not all reviewers had a harsh opinion about the publication of the sequel book. Michiko Kakutani in her Books of The Times review found that the book "makes for disturbing reading" when Scout finds her father is racist. While not fully praising the book, Kakutani found the publication of Watchman an important stepping stone in understanding Lee's work.

The publication of the novel, announced by Lee's lawyer, raised concerns over why Lee, who for 55 years had maintained that she would never write another book, would suddenly choose to publish again. In February 2015, the State of Alabama, through its Human Resources Department, launched an investigation into whether Lee was competent enough to consent to the publishing of Go Set a Watchman. The investigation found that the claims of coercion and elder abuse were unfounded, and, according to Lee's lawyer, Lee was "happy as hell" with the publication.

External videos
- Discussion with Marja Mills on The Mockingbird Next Door, July 23, 2014, C-SPAN

This characterization, however, was contested by many of Lee's friends. Marja Mills, author of The Mockingbird Next Door: Life with Harper Lee, a friend and former neighbor, painted a very different picture. In her piece for The Washington Post, "The Harper Lee I Knew", she quoted Alice—Lee's sister, whom she described as "gatekeeper, advisor, protector" for most of Lee's adult life—as saying, "Poor Nelle Harper can't see and can't hear and will sign anything put before her by anyone in whom she has confidence." She made note that Watchman was announced just two and a half months after Alice's death and that all correspondence to and from Lee went through her new attorney. She described Lee as "in a wheelchair in an assisted living center, nearly deaf and blind, with a uniformed guard posted at the door" and her visitors "restricted to those on an approved list."

The New York Times columnist Joe Nocera continued this argument. He also took issue with how the book had been promoted by the "Murdoch Empire" as a newly discovered novel and that the manuscript had been brought to light by Tonja B. Carter, who worked in Alice Lee's law office and became Lee's "new protector"—lawyer, trustee, and spokesperson—after her sister Alice's death. Nocera noted that other people in a 2011 Sotheby's meeting insisted that Lee's attorney was present in 2011, when Lee's former agent (who was subsequently fired) and the Sotheby's specialist found the manuscript. They said she knew full well that it was the same one submitted to Tay Hohoff in the 1950s that was reworked into Mockingbird, and that Carter had been sitting on the discovery, waiting for the moment when she, and not Alice, would be in charge of Harper Lee's affairs.

The authorship of both To Kill a Mockingbird and Go Set a Watchman was investigated with the help of forensic linguistics and stylometry. In a study conducted by three Polish academics, Michał Choiński, Maciej Edera and Jan Rybicki, the authorial fingerprints of Lee, Hohoff and Capote were contrasted to prove that To Kill a Mockingbird and Go Set a Watchman were both written by the same person. However, their study also suggests that Capote could have helped Lee with the writing of the opening chapters of To Kill a Mockingbird.

=== 2025: The Land of Sweet Forever ===
The Land of Sweet Forever was published on October 21, 2025. This posthumous collection, with a million copy first printing, contains eight newly discovered early short stories and eight previously published essays and magazine pieces. It also contains an introduction by her biographer, Casey Cep.

== Death ==
Lee died in her sleep on the morning of February 19, 2016, aged 89. Prior to her death, she lived in Monroeville, Alabama. On February 20, her funeral was held at First United Methodist Church in Monroeville. The service was attended by close family and friends, and the eulogy was given by Wayne Flynt.

After her death, The New York Times filed a lawsuit that argued that since Lee's will was filed in a probate court in Alabama that it is part of the public record and that Lee's will should be made public. The will was unsealed in 2018, revealing that most of Lee's assets had been bequeathed to a trust she formed in 2011.

== Fictional portrayals ==
Harper Lee was portrayed by Catherine Keener, who received nomination for Academy Award for Best Supporting Actress for the film Capote (2005), by Sandra Bullock in the film Infamous (2006), and by Tracey Hoyt in the TV movie Scandalous Me: The Jacqueline Susann Story (1998). In the adaptation of Truman Capote's novel Other Voices, Other Rooms (1995), the character of Idabel Thompkins, who was inspired by Capote's memories of Lee as a child, was played by Aubrey Dollar.

== Works ==
=== Books ===
- To Kill a Mockingbird. J. B. Lippincott & Co. 1960.
- Go Set a Watchman. HarperCollins. 2015.
- The Land of Sweet Forever. HarperCollins. 2025.

=== Articles ===
- "Love—in Other Words". Vogue. April 15, 1961.
- "Christmas to Me". McCall's. December 1961.
- "Crackling Bread" in The Artists' & Writers' Cookbook. Contact Editions. 1961.
- "When Children Discover America". McCall's. August 1965.
- Essay on Truman Capote, published in the Book of the Month Club newsletter. January 1966.
- "Romance and High Adventure", a lecture delivered at the 1983 Alabama History and Heritage Festival in Eufaula, Alabama, and collected in Clearings in the Thicket: An Alabama Humanities Reader. Mercer University Press. 1985.
- Essay on Gregory Peck, published in a special program from the American Film Institute. 1989.
- "A Letter from Harper Lee". O, The Oprah Magazine. July 2006.

== See also ==
- Alabama literature – Written works of Alabama
- Casey Cep – American journalist
