= Adelaide C. Eckardt =

American politician (born 1943)

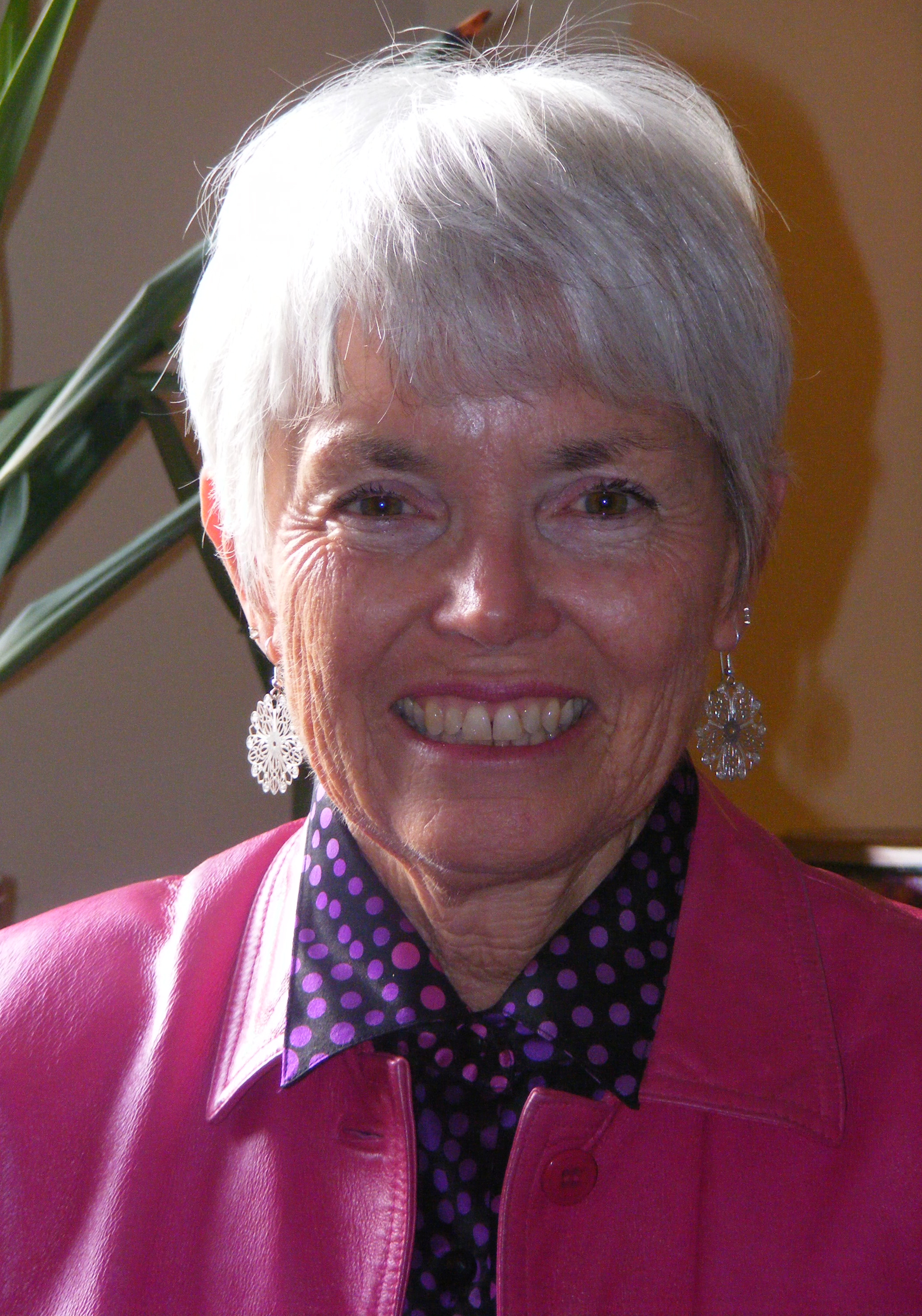

Member of the Maryland Senate from the 37th district
- In office January 14, 2015 – January 11, 2023
- Preceded by: Richard F. Colburn
- Succeeded by: Johnny Mautz

Member of the Maryland House of Delegates from the 37B district
- In office January 11, 1995 – January 14, 2015
- Preceded by: Robert Alan Thornton Jr.
- Succeeded by: Christopher T. Adams & Johnny Mautz

Personal details
- Born: September 8, 1943 (age 83) Bryn Mawr, Pennsylvania
- Party: Republican

Adelaide C. Eckardt (born September 8, 1943) is an American politician who was a member of the Maryland Senate, representing District 37.

== Background ==
Adelaide C. Eckardt was first elected in 1994 to represent the new District 37B. District 37B covers parts of Caroline, Dorchester, Talbot, & Wicomico counties.

She defeated Democratic incumbent Robert Alan Thornton Jr. and served with fellow Republican Kenneth D. Schisler. She ran in 1990, but was defeated by Kenneth D. Schisler, Robert Alan Thornton Jr., and Democrat Samuel Q. Johnson III.

In 1998, Eckardt was reelected along with Schisler. Again in 2002, Eckardt and Schisler won with little competition. Finally, in 2006, Eckardt won reelection, this time with fellow Republican, Jeannie Haddaway-Riccio. Schisler was appointed to the chair of the Maryland Public Service Commission by Governor Bob Ehrlich in May 2003.

== Education ==
Like fellow House Republican Mary Roe Walkup, Eckardt got her career start in nursing. Eckardt attended Bryn Mawr Hospital School of Nursing and received her R.N. degree. She later attended the University of Maryland, Baltimore School of Nursing attaining her B.S. in 1978, and later her M.S. in 1981. She practiced as a Registered Nurse-Psychiatric Clinical Nurse Specialist.

== Career ==
A few years later, Eckardt became an adjunct member of the faculty at Salisbury State University. Later that same year, she became a Psychiatric Nurse Clinical Specialist at Eastern Shore Hospital Center and worked there until 2003. During that same time, she also served as an adjunct member of the faculty at the University of Maryland School of Nursing. She remained on the faculty from 1991 to 1999.

Eckardt's remained active in her field, but shifted to a more administrative and legislative role. She joined the executive committee of the Maryland Hospital Association in 1993 and has served on the board of directors for Leadership Maryland, Inc., a non-profit organization committed to the betterment of Maryland, since 2001.

Currently, Eckardt is a board member of the Chesapeake Health Planning Systems, a member of the Maryland Nurses Association, the American Nurses Association, the American Ortho-Psychiatric Association, and Sigma Theta Tau, the honor society of nursing.

She is a past recipient of the Psychiatric Nursing Award from the University of Maryland Graduate School of Nursing in 1981. In 1986 and again in 1991, Eckard was named Nurse of the Year, District 4, by the Maryland Nurses Association. In 1988, she won the Rosalie S. Abrams Legislative Award from the Maryland Nurses Association. She received the Outstanding Board Member Award from the Maryland Nurses Association in 1992. Later she received the Outstanding Rural Legislator Award from the Rural Maryland Council in 2003. Additionally in 2003, she received recognition for her efforts from Local Management Board. Finally, she was listed as a member of Maryland's Top 100 Women by the Daily Record, a local newspaper, in 2003, 2005, and 2007.

In July 2022, Eckardt was defeated in the Republican primary by state delegate Johnny Mautz. Following her defeat, she announced on July 25, 2022, that she would run in the Cambridge mayoral special election on August 23, 2022. No candidate received the majority of the vote, forcing a runoff between Eckardt and former Cambridge commissioner Steve Rideout on September 20, 2022. She was defeated by Rideout 55%-45%. In November 2022, Governor-elect Wes Moore announced that Eckardt would serve on the steering committee of his transition team.

=== Legislative notes ===
- voted against the Clean Indoor Air Act of 2007 (HB359)
- voted for the Healthy Air Act in 2006(SB154)
- voted for slots in 2005 (HB1361)
- voted for electric deregulation in 1999 (HB703)
- voted against in-state tuition for illegal immigrants in 2007 (HB6)
- voted against police transparency in 2021 (HB1090)

== Election results ==
- 2006 Race for Maryland House of Delegates – District 37B

Voters to choose two:

Name	Votes	Percent	Outcome
Adelaide C. Eckardt, Rep.	19,980	34.5%	Won
Jeannie Haddaway-Riccio, Rep.	18,677	32.2%	Won
James A. Adkins, Dem.	9,640	16.6%	Lost
Tim Quinn, Dem.	9,588	16.6%	Lost
Other Write-Ins	34	0.1%	Lost

- 2002 Race for Maryland House of Delegates – District 37B

Voters to choose two:

Name	Votes	Percent	Outcome
Adelaide C. Eckardt, Rep.	21,100	50.2%	Won
Kenneth D. Schisler, Rep.	20,718	49.3%	Won
Other Write-Ins	200	0.5%	Lost

- 1998 Race for Maryland House of Delegates – District 37B

Voters to choose two:

Name	Votes	Percent	Outcome
Adelaide C. Eckardt, Rep.	16,558	42%	Won
Kenneth D. Schisler, Rep.	15,604	40%	Won
William Steven Brohawn, Dem.	7,340	19%	Lost

- 1994 Race for Maryland House of Delegates – District 37B

Voters to choose two:

Name	Votes	Percent	Outcome
Adelaide C. Eckardt, Rep.	11,422	27%	Won
Kenneth D. Schisler, Rep.	14,992	35%	Won
Philip Carey Foster, Dem.	6,618	16%	Lost
Robert Alan Thornton Jr, Dem.	9,240	22%	Lost

- 1990 Race for Maryland House of Delegates – District 37

Voters to choose three:

Name	Votes	Percent	Outcome
Samuel Q. Johnson, Dem.	12,803	23%	Won
Kenneth D. Schisler, Rep.	11,096	20%	Won
Robert Alan Thornton Jr, Dem.	12,480	23%	Won
Adelaide C. Eckardt, Rep.	9,559	17%	Lost
Don William Bradley, Dem.	9,210	17%	Lost
