= Easton High School =

Coordinates: 38.7558°N 76.0658°W

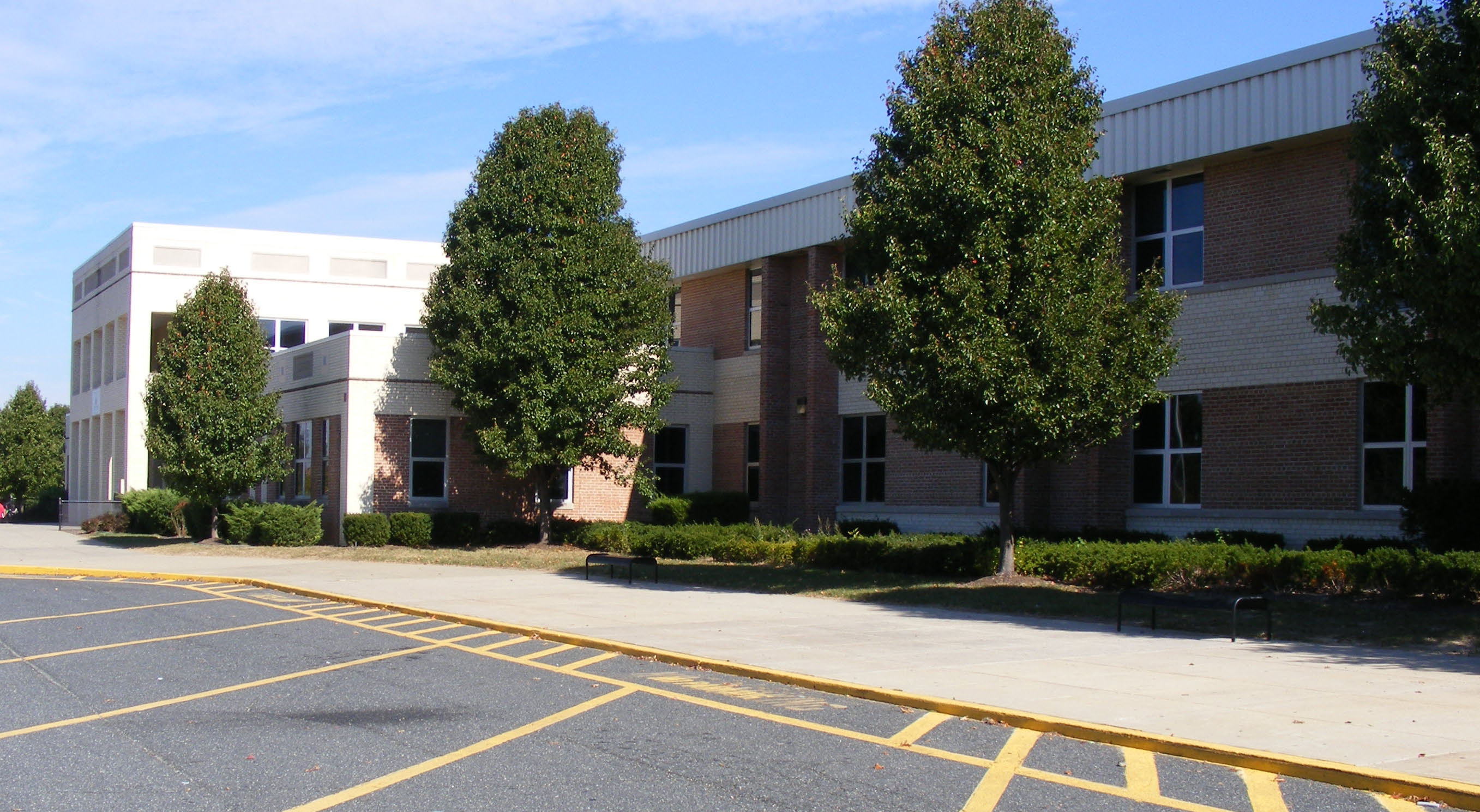

Location
- 723 Mecklenburg Avenue; Easton, Maryland 21601; United States

Information
- Type: Public high school
- School district: Talbot County Public Schools
- Principal: Sherry Spurry
- Grades: 9-12
- Language: English
- Hours in school day: 7:45am - 2:40pm
- Colors: Black and Orange
- Website: Easton High School

Easton High School (EHS) is a four-year comprehensive public high school in Easton, Talbot County, Maryland, United States. It is one of two public high schools in Talbot County along with St. Michaels Middle/High School.

== Overview ==
The school is located on the Eastern Shore of Maryland in the town of Easton in Talbot County. The school is on Mecklenburg Avenue, which is west of U.S. 50 and east of Maryland 565.

The current building has 100,000 square feet (9,300 m^{2}) of space located on 32.91 acres (13.32 ha) of land.

== Students ==
Easton's graduation rate has been fairly steady over the past 12 years. In 2007 the school graduated 94.1%, up from 80.73% in 1997 and the highest in the previous 12 years.

The school population has increased nearly 50% over the past 12 years. In 2007 the school was at its 12-year high enrollment with 1,228 students.

Student population
1993	1994	1995	1996	1997	1998	1999	2000	2001	2002	2003	2004	2005	2006	2007	2008
843	866	843	929	916	1,025	1,078	1,037	1,073	1,082	1,063	1,149	1,168	1,202	1,228	1,433

== Athletics ==
=== State championships ===
Field Hockey:

- Class 1A 1988, 1990, 1991

Girls Soccer

- Pre-MPSSAA (Field Ball) Class C 1946, 1948

Boys Soccer

- Class 1A 1989, 1993, 1994

Girls Basketball

- Class C 1947, 1949
- Class 1A 1993, 1994

Boys Basketball

- Class B 1968
- Jack Willard Sportsmanship Award 2011

Boys Swimming & Diving

- 200 Yard Medley Relay Class 3A-2A-1A 2009

Baseball

- Class C 1987 (Undefeated)
- Class 1A 1994, 1995

Boys Lacrosse

- Class 2A 2015

Softball

- Class 2A 2000, 2002, 2004, 2008, 2010, 2011, 2013
- Eugene Robertson Sportsmanship Award 2010

Tennis

- Mixed Doubles 1983
- Girls Doubles 1985, 1986, 1987
- Boys Doubles 2019

Boys Track & Field

- Pre-MPSSAA Class C 1947, 1948, 1949
- Pre-MPSSAA Class B 1950
- Class B 1952

== Notable alumni ==
- Casey Cep — author
- Richard F. Colburn — former Maryland State Senator
- Jawann Kelley-Gibson — athlete, coach
- Jean Louisa Kelly — actress
- Chris Moore — film producer
- Cynthia C. Morton — geneticist
- Frank Robinson, Jr. — athlete
- James Rouse — developer, philanthropist

== See also ==
- List of high schools in Maryland
- Talbot County Public Schools
