= St. Michaels Middle/High School =

Coordinates: 38.7799°N 76.2159°W

Location
- 200 Seymour Avenue; St. Michael's, MD, Maryland 21663; United States

Information
- Type: Public high school
- School district: Talbot County Public Schools
- Principal: Todd Stoker
- Grades: 6-12
- Campus: Modern picturesque facility in a friendly small town
- Website: SMMHS website

St. Michael's Middle and High School (SMMHS) is a seven-year public middle school / high school in St. Michaels, Maryland, United States, in Talbot County. It is one of two public high schools in Talbot County along with Easton High School. St. Michaels High School is the smallest on the Eastern Shore of Maryland.

== Overview ==
The school is located on the Eastern Shore of Maryland in the town of St. Michael's, MD, a waterside fishing port on the Chesapeake Bay. The school is on Maryland Route 33, just west of Easton, Maryland and U.S. 50.

== Students ==
St. Michael's graduation rate has fluctuated a bit over the years, however that may be attributable to the school's small size. In 2007 the school graduated 88.46%, up from 78.69% in 2004.

Like the graduation rate, the school population has been fluctuated over the past several years, with a total of 471 attending in 2016. The school's population peaked in 2000 with 506 students, with a low of 221 in 1993.

== Court Case ==
In Max Brennan v. Board of Education of Talbot County et al., U.S. District Judge George L. Russell III sided with the plaintiff, a transgender male student. Brennan had previously been only authorized to use specified gender neutral bathrooms in his school, St. Michaels Middle/High School. Once a 4th Circuit Court ruling deferred to Obama-era guidance on school bathroom usage, Brennan was then allowed to use the male bathrooms, but not the locker rooms. However, on March 12, 2018, the judge ruled that this amounts to discrimination and "harms his health and well-being...[as the policy] does not apply to anyone else at the high school, and marks him as different for being transgender." Litigation in this case is still ongoing, and no changes to policies have been made.

== Sports ==
State Champions

- 2017 - Baseball
- 2013 - Tennis
- 2012 - Tennis
- 2011 - Baseball
- 2011 - Tennis
- 2010 - Baseball
- 2010 - Tennis
- 2008 - Baseball
- 2001 - Baseball
- 2010 - Wrestling, Jordan Gowe, Individual State Champion (171 lbs.)
- 1984 - Wrestling, Ray Carpenter, Individual State Champion
- 1975 - Boys' Soccer
- 1974 - Boys' Soccer

State Finalist

- 2018 - Baseball
- 2003 - Softball
- 2000 - Baseball
- 1997 - Boys' Soccer
- 1984 - Boys' Soccer
- 1983 - Girls' Field Hockey
- 1982 - Girls' Field Hockey
- 1981 - Girls' Field Hockey
- 1976 - Boys' Soccer
- 1965 - Boys' Cross Country

State Semi-Finalist

- 2016 - Baseball
- 2002 - Boys' Soccer
- 2002 - Softball
- 2000 - Boys' Soccer
- 2000 - Softball
- 1999 - Boys' Soccer
- 1999 - Softball
- 1998 - Softball
- 1987 - Girls' Field Hockey
- 1984 - Girls' Field Hockey
- 1982 - Boys' Soccer
- 1981 - Boys' Soccer
- 1979 - Boys' Soccer
- 1977 - Boys' Soccer

== Notable alumni ==
- Harold Baines, former Major League Baseball player
- Jeannie Haddaway-Riccio - member of the Maryland House of Delegates

== See also ==
- List of high schools in Maryland
