= Jeannie Haddaway-Riccio =

American politician

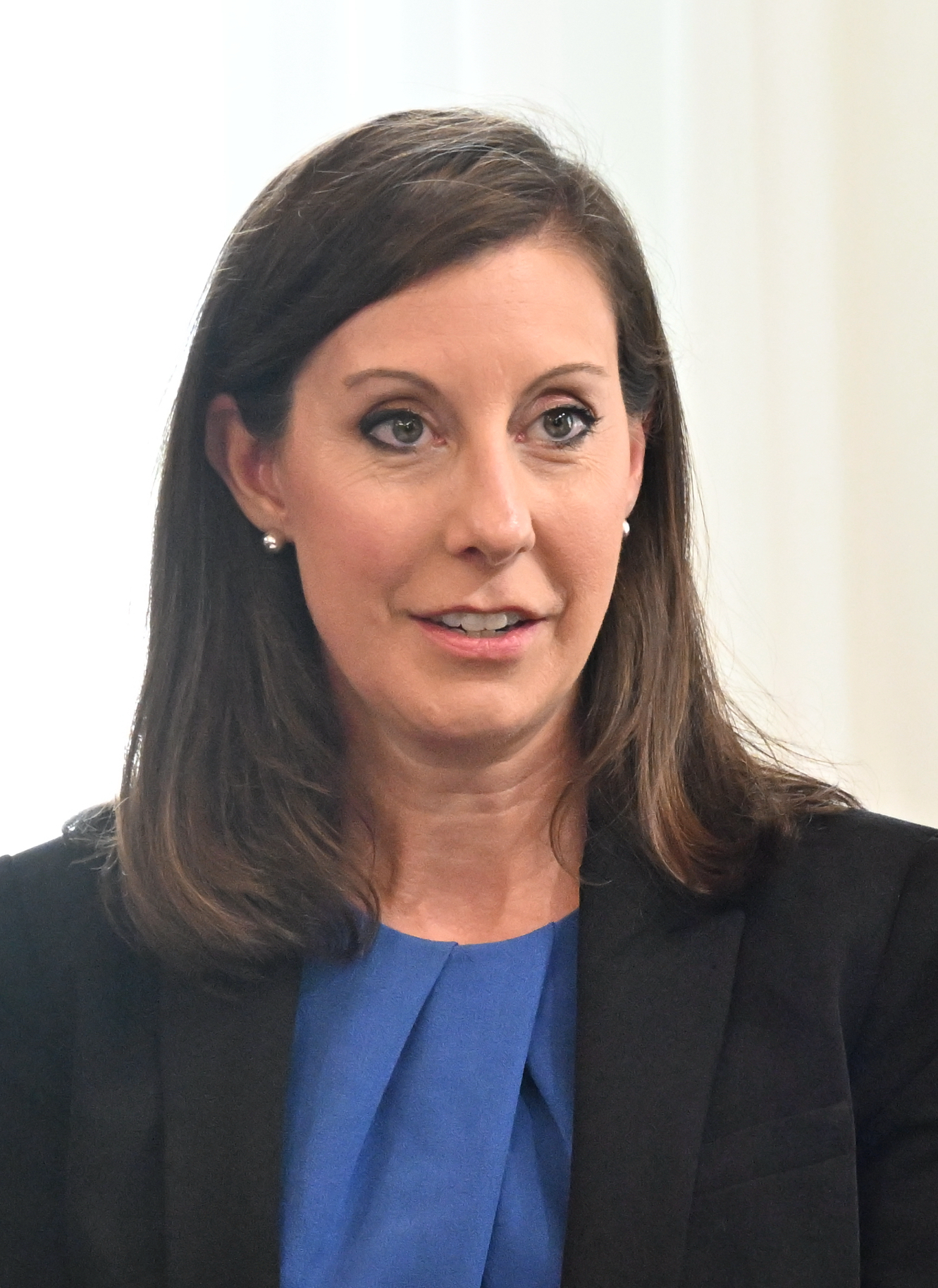
- Haddaway-Riccio in 2022

Secretary of the Maryland Department of Natural Resources
- In office March 8, 2019 – January 18, 2023; Acting: February 4, 2019 – March 8, 2019
- Governor: Larry Hogan
- Preceded by: Mark J. Belton
- Succeeded by: Josh Kurtz

Deputy Chief of Staff to the Governor of Maryland
- In office January 5, 2016 – February 4, 2019
- Governor: Larry Hogan
- Preceded by: Michael Richard
- Succeeded by: Stephen E. Schatz

Director of Intergovernmental Affairs to the Governor of Maryland
- In office January 21, 2015 – January 5, 2016
- Governor: Larry Hogan
- Succeeded by: Kristal Q. Hartsfield

Member of the Maryland House of Delegates from the 37B district
- In office August 19, 2003 – January 3, 2015 Serving with Adelaide C. Eckardt
- Appointed by: Bob Ehrlich
- Preceded by: Kenneth D. Schisler
- Succeeded by: Johnny Mautz

Personal details
- Born: Jeannie Haddaway; April 30, 1977 (age 49) Easton, Maryland, U.S.
- Party: Republican
- Spouse: Joseph Riccio (m. 2005)
- Education: Salisbury University (BA)

Jeannie Haddaway-Riccio (born April 30, 1977) is an American politician who served as the secretary of the Maryland Department of Natural Resources from 2019 to 2023. A member of the Republican Party, she was a member of the Maryland House of Delegates from District 37B from 2003 to 2015.

== Early life and education ==
Jeannie Haddaway was born in Easton, Maryland, to Herman and Barbara Haddaway. Her parents worked as a waterman and a boat builder. She was raised in Neavitt, Maryland, where she graduated from St. Michael's High School before attending Salisbury University, where she served as vice-president of university affairs from 1998 to 1999 and earned a Bachelor of Arts degree in political science in 1999.

== Career ==
After graduating from Salisbury, Haddaway worked as a public affairs specialist and administrative assistance for the Maryland Department of the Environment from 1999 to 2000. Afterwards, she worked as a development personnel for the Maryland-D.C. office of the National Audubon Society until 2003. Haddaway-Riccio owns her own graphic and web-design company, Dragonfly Designs LLC.

Haddaway first became involved with politics as a legislative page during the 1995 legislative session and as a volunteer for the presidential campaigns of Bob Dole in 1996 and George W. Bush in 2000, and the 2002 gubernatorial campaign of Bob Ehrlich. She as a member of the Mid-Shore League of Republican Women and Republicans for Environmental Protection, and as an organizer for the Mid-Shore Young Republicans group. Haddaway was elected to the Talbot County Republican Central Committee in 2002.

=== Maryland House of Delegates ===
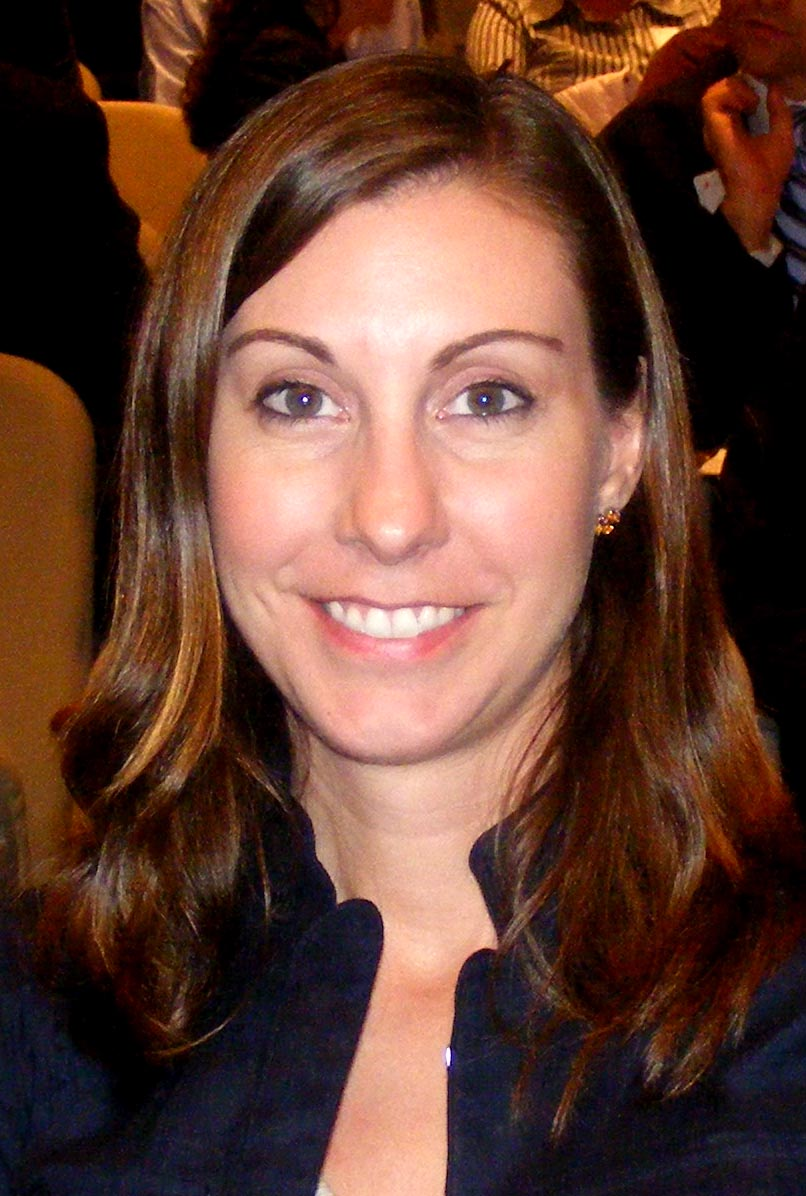
Haddaway-Riccio in 2007

In June 2003, Haddaway applied to fill a vacancy in the Maryland House of Delegates left by the appointment of then-delegate Kenneth D. Schisler to the Maryland Public Service Commission. She was appointed to the seat by Governor Bob Ehrlich on August 5, and sworn in on August 19, 2003. Sworn in at 26 years old, Haddaway-Riccio was one of the youngest members in the Maryland House of Delegates. She was elected to a full four-year term in 2006.

Haddaway-Riccio was a member of the Economic Matters Committee during her entire tenure and served as minority whip from 2011 to 2013. She was also a member of the Eastern Shore Delegation, the Maryland Rural Caucus, and the Women Legislators of Maryland. She was a delegate to the 2012 Republican National Convention, pledged to Mitt Romney.

=== 2014 lieutenant gubernatorial campaign ===
In July 2013, Harford County Executive David R. Craig announced that Haddaway-Riccio would be his running mate in the 2014 Maryland gubernatorial election. On the campaign trail, Haddaway-Riccio ran on a platform promising a more rational approach toward taxes and business regulations and supported efforts to help Maryland's rural areas. In February 2014, the Craig-Riccio campaign was fined $2,000 after Haddaway-Riccio sent out a fundraising solicitation email after the start of the 2014 legislative session, during which legislators are prohibited from raising money. The Craig-Riccio ticket lost the Republican primary to businessman Larry Hogan and his running mate, Boyd Rutherford, in June 2014, placing second with 29.1 percent of the vote. Had the Craig-Riccio ticket won the Republican primary and defeated Anthony Brown in the general election, Haddaway-Riccio would have been the state's first lieutenant governor from the Eastern Shore.

=== Hogan administration ===
Haddaway-Riccio served as a member of Governor-elect Larry Hogan's transition team. In January 2015, Hogan appointed Haddaway-Riccio as his administration's director of intergovernmental affairs. She served in this position from January 2015 to January 2016, after which she served as a deputy chief of staff to the governor until 2019.

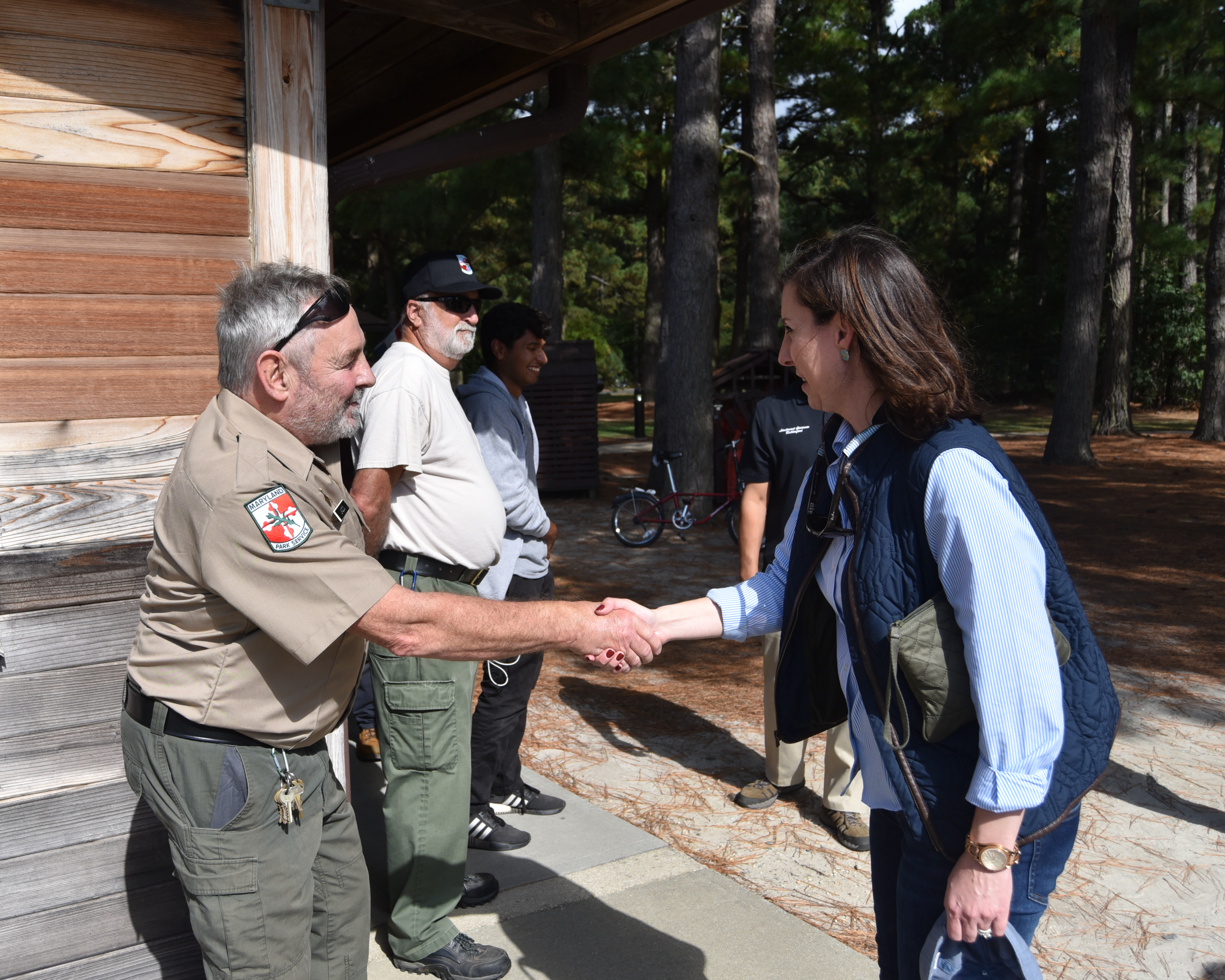
Haddaway-Riccio shakes hands with park employees at Janes Island State Park, 2021

On January 19, 2019, Hogan appointed Haddaway-Riccio to serve as the Maryland Secretary of Natural Resources, succeeding Mark Belton. In this capacity, Haddaway-Riccio supported bills to ban balloon releases and proposals to expand oyster harvesting in the state. She also criticized a bill that would involve environmentalists, watermen, and scientists into the decision-making process on oyster harvesting rules in the Chesapeake Bay. During her Senate confirmation hearing, Haddaway-Riccio declined to answer questions from lawmakers regarding her role in the firing or demotion of half a dozen agency scientists during Hogan's first term as governor or about conversations she had with watermen, but pledged to be fair-minded and sensitive to scientists in the department. The Senate Executive Nominations Committee voted 18–1 to move Haddaway-Riccio's appointment to the Senate floor, where her nomination was approved on March 8, 2019. Haddaway-Riccio is the second woman to serve as Maryland Secretary of Natural Resources after Sarah Taylor-Rodgers, who served from 1999 to 2001.

In September 2022, Baltimore County Police arrested Michael Browning, the manager of Gunpowder Falls State Park, on 27 charges of rape, sexual assault, and assault stemming from attacks on two women who worked at Gunpowder. In October, The Baltimore Banner interviewed multiple current and former DNR employees and reviewed written accounts detailing alleged misconduct by Browning and his assistant park manager at Gunpowder, Dean Hughes, and concluded that Browning had presided a toxic work environment that saw employees who challenged Browning lose park housing and state vehicles, get reassigned to demeaning or impossible tasks, or get passed over for promotions. The report further suggested that senior park service officials had emailed complaints about Browning to senior park service officials since 2015, but authorities did nothing to address them. Following the Baltimore Banner report, state senator Sarah Elfreth and state House majority leader Eric Luedtke wrote to Haddaway-Riccio calling for an independent review into the Maryland Department of Natural Resources' handling of employee reports. In November, Haddaway-Riccio told lawmakers that the department's human resources division was investigating the misconduct allegations "in consultation with the Maryland Department of Budget and Management and the Office of the Attorney General" but did not address legislators' call for an independent investigation, and added that she had taken "appropriate actions to address the situation" by firing Hughes and state park superintendent Nita Settina.

== Post-secretary career ==
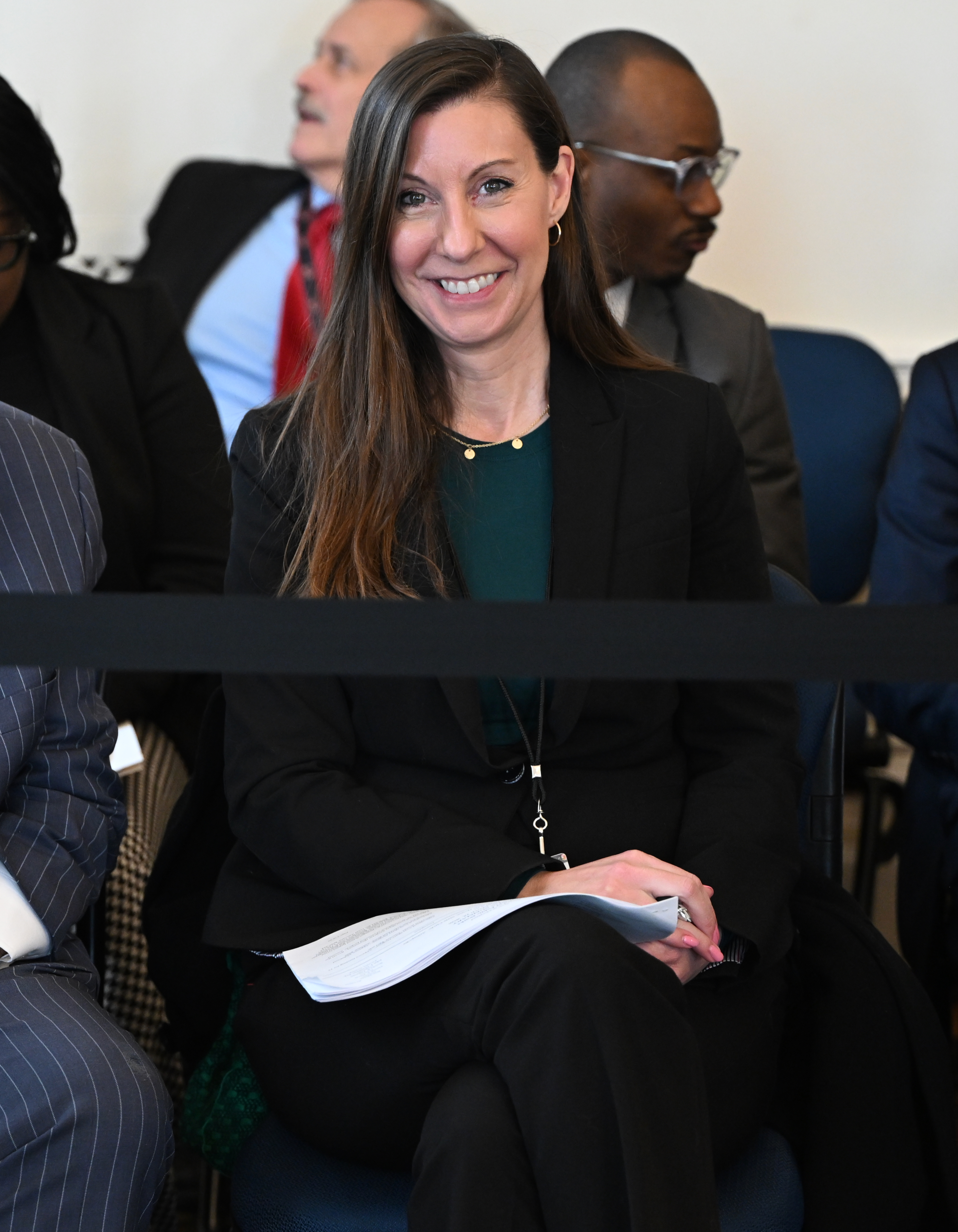
Haddaway-Riccio at a Maryland Board of Public Works meeting, 2026

In August 2024, Haddaway-Riccio formed a lobbying and consulting group, R & R Solutions, with civil engineer Robert Rauch.

== Political positions ==
=== Education ===
In February 2004, Haddaway introduced a bill to hold a non-binding referendum in Talbot County to give the county an elected school board. The bill passed and was signed into law by Governor Bob Ehrlich, and overwhelmingly approved by voters in the 2004 elections. During the 2005 legislative session, Haddaway introduced legislation implementing the elected school board system.

=== Environment ===
During the 2005 legislative session, Haddaway introduced legislation to recognize the use of electronic postmarks as a substitute for registered mail.

=== Gambling ===
During the 2004 legislative session, Haddaway supported Governor Bob Ehrlich's proposal to legalize slot machine gambling at state racetracks.

=== Immigration ===
In February 2005, Haddaway wrote to members of Maryland's congressional delegation to support proposals to amend federal law to allow Eastern Shore seafood processors to obtain H-2B visas for foreign nationals.

=== Redistricting ===
During the 2004 legislative session, Haddaway introduced a bill to add an amendment to the Constitution of Maryland requiring every county to have a resident delegate.

=== Taxes ===
During the 2005 legislative session, Haddaway introduced legislation to provide movie companies that film in Maryland with employer wage rebates. In March 2013, during debate on a bill to index Maryland's gas tax to inflation, she introduced an amendment that would cap increases to one percent per year, which was rejected by an 81–50 vote.

== Personal life ==
Haddaway met her future husband, Joseph Riccio, during a political function in November 2002. They were engaged on New Year's Eve in Annapolis, Maryland, about a year later, and married on August 6, 2005. Riccio operates his own real estate company, Maritime Properties LLC. Haddaway and Riccio appeared as extras in the film Wedding Crashers, which was filmed at the Inn at Perry Cabin in Saint Michaels, Maryland.

Haddaway-Riccio is a member of the Easton Church of God.

== Electoral history ==
Maryland House of Delegates District 37B Republican primary election, 2006
| Party | Candidate | Votes | % |
|---|---|---|---|
| Republican | Jeannie Haddaway-Riccio (incumbent) | 6,120 | 46.0 |
| Republican | Adelaide C. Eckardt (incumbent) | 6,047 | 45.4 |
| Republican | Redgie S. Lancaster | 1,145 | 8.6 |

Maryland House of Delegates District 37B election, 2006
| Party | Candidate | Votes | % |
|---|---|---|---|
| Republican | Adelaide C. Eckardt (incumbent) | 19,980 | 34.5 |
| Republican | Jeannie Haddaway-Riccio (incumbent) | 18,677 | 32.2 |
| Democratic | James A. Adkins | 9,640 | 16.6 |
| Democratic | Tim Quinn | 9,588 | 16.6 |
| Write-in | | 34 | 0.1 |

Maryland House of Delegates District 37B election, 2010
| Party | Candidate | Votes | % |
|---|---|---|---|
| Republican | Adelaide C. Eckardt (incumbent) | 23,106 | 41.3 |
| Republican | Jeannie Haddaway-Riccio (incumbent) | 22,309 | 39.9 |
| Democratic | Patrice L. Stanley | 10,476 | 18.7 |
| Write-in | | 82 | 0.1 |

Maryland gubernatorial Republican primary election, 2014
| Party | Candidate | Votes | % |
|---|---|---|---|
| Republican | Larry Hogan; Boyd Rutherford | 92,376 | 43.0 |
| Republican | David R. Craig; Jeannie Haddaway-Riccio | 62,639 | 29.1 |
| Republican | Charles Lollar; Kenneth R. Timmerman | 33,292 | 15.5 |
| Republican | Ron George; Shelley Aloi | 26,628 | 12.4 |
