= Richard F. Colburn =

American politician (1950–2024)

- Colburn in 2009

Member of the Maryland Senate from the 37th district
- In office January 11, 1995 – January 14, 2015
- Preceded by: Frederick C. Malkus Jr.
- Succeeded by: Adelaide C. Eckardt

Member of the Maryland House of Delegates from the 37th district
- In office January 12, 1983 – January 9, 1991
- Preceded by: R. Charles Avara; Joseph O'Malley; Paul Weisengoff
- Succeeded by: Kenneth D. Schisler

Personal details
- Born: February 9, 1950 Easton, Maryland, U.S.
- Died: December 27, 2024 (aged 74) Easton, Maryland, U.S.
- Party: Republican
- Spouse: Alma Colburn

Military service
- Branch/service: United States Army
- Years of service: 1969–1972
- Rank: Sergeant
- Unit: United States Army Security Agency

Richard Franklin Colburn (February 9, 1950 – December 27, 2024) was an American politician who was a Republican state senator for District 37 in Maryland.

== Early life and education ==
Colburn was born on February 9, 1950, in Oxford, Maryland, to Peggy J. and Charles Franklin Colburn Jr. He graduated from Easton High School, afterwards joining the U.S. Army and serving with the U.S. Army Security Agency in Germany from 1969 to 1972, being discharged with the rank of sergeant. He then received his A.A. degree in 1982 from Chesapeake College.

In 2005, a former aide of Colburn, Gregory Dukes, claimed to have written term papers for two sociology courses Colburn was taking at the University of Maryland Eastern Shore towards a bachelor's degree. Colburn withdrew from the school shortly after Dukes made his complaint to the university. Dukes also alleged that Colburn had asked his former aide and retired academic Conway Gregory to be an advisor for his course and that Gregory had rewritten one of his term papers. Colburn called Dukes a "disgruntled employee" and said he only asked Dukes to type out term papers he had already written and that he left the course because of the stresses of his work as a senator. The Joint Committee on Legislative Ethics of the Maryland General Assembly dismissed the complaint.

== Career ==
Colburn was employed with A&P/SuperFresh after returning from the U.S. Army. He first became involved with politics as a member of the Dorchester County Republican State Central Committee, serving from 1979 until 1982. He was selected to be a delegate to the 1988 Republican National Convention. Colburn was the town manager for Federalsburg, Maryland in Caroline County from 1991 to 2015.

In 1992, Colburn was selected to serve on the board of directors for the Maryland Rural Water Association, an organization that "provides free technical services, training, and assistance to small drinking and waste water systems in the rural areas throughout the state of Maryland." He was a past vice-president of that organization.

Colburn was active in the People for Better Housing organization and was president of the board of directors.

He belonged to several other organizations including the American Legion, the Veterans of Foreign Wars (VFW), the Zion United Methodist Church, and the Elks. He received numerous awards including the Good Conduct Medal while serving his country in the military, the Social Science Award at Chesapeake College in 1980, and the Social Science Award at Eastern Community College in 1981.

== Maryland General Assembly ==
In the legislature, Colburn was viewed as a low-profile lawmaker who was a reliable conservative vote as well as an advocate for rural interests. Prior to being elected to the Maryland State Senate, Colburn was a member of the Maryland House of Delegates. While serving in the House, he was a member of the Constitutional and Administrative Law Committee from 1983 to 1986, the Environmental Matters Committee from 1987 to 1991, and a member of the Governor's Committee on Employment of the Handicapped from 1984 until 1990. In addition, he was also on the Lead Poisoning Prevention Commission. While in the Maryland Senate, Colburn served on the Education, Health and Environmental Affairs Committee from 2003 to 2010, the Joint Committee on Administrative, Executive and Legislative Review since 1996, the Joint Committee on the Chesapeake and Atlantic Coastal Bays Critical Area since 2003, the Executive Nominations Committee since 2008 and the Oyster Advisory Commission. He previously served as Chair of the Alcoholic Beverages subcommittee. He served on the Senate Budget and Taxation Committee, the Public Safety, Transportation and Environment subcommittee and the Capital Budget subcommittee.

Colburn previously served on the Judicial Proceedings Committee from 1995 to 2003, and the Special Committee on Substance Abuse from 2001 until 2003. In 2004, he served on the Senate Special Commission on Medical Malpractice Liability Insurance and from 2006 until 2006, served on the Agricultural Stewardship Commission.

Colburn was the Senate chair of the Eastern Shore Delegation, a committee he served from 1999 to 2015. He was a member of the Maryland Legislative Sportsmen's Caucus from 2001 to 2015, the Maryland Rural Caucus from 2002 to 2015, the Taxpayers Protection Caucus from 2003 to 2015, and finally the Maryland Veterans Caucus from 2004 to 2015.

== Post-legislative career ==
After leaving the legislature in 2015, Governor Larry Hogan appointed Colburn to serve as a legislative aide to Maryland agriculture secretary Joseph Bartenfelder. He served in this position for eight years, retiring in 2022.

== Personal life and death ==
Colburn was married to Alma. In 2014 she filed for divorce, alleging that he had a relationship with a former aide.

Colburn died in Easton on December 27, 2024, at the age of 74.

== Electoral history ==
Richard Colburn was first elected to the Maryland State Senate in 1994 to represent District 37, which covers Caroline, Dorchester, Talbot, and Wicomico Counties. In that year he defeated Democratic challenger Samuel Q. Johnson III and won the seat left open by Frederick C. Malkus Jr., who retired after 47 years in the Maryland General Assembly.

In the 1998 election Colburn defeated his challenger, former Democratic state delegate Robert Alan Thornton, Jr. He captured 59% of the vote to Thornton’s 41%.

The election in 2002 saw challenger Grason Eckel manage to get 31% of the vote. Colburn received almost 69% of the vote to go on and serve four more years.

In 2006, a year that saw many Republicans lose their seats all across the country, Colburn managed to keep his. That year saw him defeat Democrat Hilary Spence, who received almost 39% of the vote to Colburn’s 56%. Five percent of the vote was split between write-in candidates and Moonyene Jackson-Amis.

In November 2010, Senator Colburn was re-elected to his 5th term in the Maryland State Senate defeating Cambridge Attorney Chris Robinson.

Colburn was also a member of the Maryland House of Delegates. In his last election for the House in 1986, he won along with Democrats William S. Horne and Samuel Q. Johnson, III. Colburn ran for Congress from Maryland's 1st congressional district in 1990, losing in the Republican primary. Republican Ken Schisler won the House of Delegates seat left open by Colburn in 1990.
