= John Keats (writer) =

American writer and biographer (1921–2000)

John C. Keats (1921 – November 3, 2000) was an American writer and biographer.

== Biography ==
Keats was born in Moultrie, Georgia. He attended the University of Michigan and the University of Pennsylvania before serving in the United States Army Air Forces in the Pacific during World War II.

Keats worked for the Washington Daily News in the 1950s. His debut as an author came in 1956 with The Crack in the Picture Window, a broadside at sprawling suburban housing developments. He also wrote numerous magazine articles, which led to non-fiction books and biographies.

In the 1950s, Keats bought "Pine Island", one of the Thousand Islands, as a vacation home for himself, his wife and their three children. However, at the time of his death in 2000, he was living in Kingston, Ontario, where he had moved in order to be close to the island featured in his 1974 book Of Time and an Island.

From 1974 to 1990 Keats taught magazine writing at Syracuse University.

Keats died on November 3, 2000, in Kingston, Ontario, Canada. He was 79.

== Works ==
- The Crack in the Picture Window (Houghton, 1956)
- The Insolent Chariots (Lippincott, 1958)
- Schools Without Scholars (Houghton, 1958)
- The Sheepskin Psychosis (Lippincott, 1965)
- They Fought Alone (Lippincott, 1963)
- What Ever Happened to Mom's Apple Pie: The American Food Industry and How to Cope With It (Houghton) 1976

Biographies

- Howard Hughes: The Biography of a Texas Billionaire (Random House; revised edition, 1972)
- You Might as Well Live: The Life and Times of Dorothy Parker (Simon & Schuster, 1970).

Other books

- The New Romans: An American Experience (Lippincott, 1967)
- Of Time and an Island (Charterhouse, 1974)
