= Kenneth D. Schisler =

American politician

Chair of the Maryland Public Service Commission
- In office July 1, 2003 – February 2, 2007
- Preceded by: Catherine Riley
- Succeeded by: Steven Larsen

Minority Whip of the Maryland House of Delegates
- In office November 26, 2002 – June 17, 2003
- Preceded by: James F. Ports Jr.
- Succeeded by: Tony O'Donnell

Member of the Maryland House of Delegates from the 37B district
- In office January 9, 1991 – June 30, 2003
- Preceded by: Richard F. Colburn
- Succeeded by: Jeannie Haddaway-Riccio

Personal details
- Born: July 31, 1969 (age 57) Baltimore, Maryland
- Party: Republican
- Profession: lawyer, politician
- Website: Official website

Kenneth D. Schisler (born July 31, 1969) is a former member of the Maryland House of Delegates and former chair of the Maryland Public Service Commission.

== Background ==
Schisler was first elected to office in 1990 when he was only 21 years old. He was elected to represent District 37, which covered Caroline, Dorchester, Talbot, and Wicomico counties. He was elected along with three Democrats - Don William Bradley, Samuel Q. Johnson III, and Robert A. Thornton, Jr. He replaced Republican Richard F. Colburn, who eventually returned to the General Assembly in 1995 as a State Senator.

In 1994, District 37 was divided into 37A (Dorchester and Wicomico Counties) and District 37B (Caroline, Dorchester, Talbot, and Wicomico Counties). In this reconfigured district, Schisler won reelection along with fellow Republican Adelaide C. Eckardt, one of the candidates he defeated in 1990. Schisler and Eckardt defeated Democratic incumbent Robert Thornton, Jr. and challenger Philip Carey Foster.

In 1998, Schisler and Eckardt again won reelection, this time defeating Democratic challenger William Steven Brohawn. The next general election in 2002 had similar results, except there was no formal Democratic challenger.

== Education ==
Schisler attended St. Michaels High School in St. Michaels in Talbot County, MD. He went to Salisbury State University where he earned his B.S. in biology in 1992. He later returned to college and to get his J.D. from the University of Maryland School of Law in 1998. During his undergraduate years at Salisbury State, Schisler was initiated into the Sigma Alpha Epsilon fraternity.

== Career ==
Schisler was admitted to the Maryland Bar in 1999 and began practicing as an attorney. He is also a member of the Talbot County Bar Association.

In 1992, he was selected as a delegate for the Republican National Convention. In 1993 he got to serve as a delegate to Poland and Hungary as part of the American Council of Young Political Leaders. In addition, Schisler is a charter member of the Talbot County Young Republicans club.

Outside of his political activities, Schisler is a member of Ducks Unlimited, an "international non-profit organization dedicated to the conservation of wetlands and associated upland habitats for waterfowl". He is active member in several environmental groups including the Maryland Ornithological Society, a group that focuses on the protection of birds, and Nature Conservancy.

Schisler is also a member of the National Rifle Association of America, and the Sigma Alpha Epsilon fraternity. He was once a participant in Boys State, a leadership action program, which was sponsored by the American Legion of Maryland.

Schisler has earned numerous awards including the Phi Eta Sigma Honor Society, (1987), the Outstanding Academics Award and The Humanitarian Award from Sigma Alpha Epsilon in the 1989-90 school year, and the Outstanding Greek Scholar from Salisbury State University, also during the 1989-90 school year.

== House of Delegates ==
As a member of the Maryland House of Delegates, he was a Minority Whip from 2002 until 2003, Deputy Minority Whip from 1994 until 1997, a member of the Environmental Matters Committee, several subcommittees, and the Joint Committee on Chesapeake Bay Critical Areas from 1992 until 2003. He resigned as Whip in 2003 after his appointment to the Maryland Public Service Commission. He served as a member of the Department of Natural Resources Special Funds Work Group from 2002 and 2003 and the Joint Committee on the Selection of the State Treasurer in 2003.

Schisler was the chair of the Talbot County Delegation and the Eastern Shore Delegation in 2003. He also served on the American Legislative Exchange Council, a task force on energy, environment, & natural resources. Furthermore, he served on a Solid Waste Management Task Force in 1998, the Governor's Task Force on Eastern Shore Economic Development from 1999 until 2001, and the Mid-Shore Regional Council from 2001 until 2003. Finally, he was on the Tri-County Council for the Lower Eastern Shore of Maryland from 2001 until 2003.

=== Legislative notes ===
- voted for electric deregulation in 1999 (HB703)

== Public Service Commission ==
From 1997 until 1998 he served on the Task Force to Study Retail Electric Competition and the Restructuring of the Electric Utility Industry. This is relevant to the work in his next position, the chair of the Maryland Public Service Commission (PSC). Schisler was appointed to the five year position by Governor Bob Ehrlich in 2003 to succeed Catherine I. Riley. This appointment was approved by the Maryland General Assembly.

During the 2006 gubernatorial election, Schisler came under fire by the Maryland General Assembly and Democratic candidate Martin O'Malley for approving a 72% rate hike by utility provider Baltimore Gas & Electric (BGE). Schisler's defended his position by stating that the rate hike was the long-term result to the deregulation plan enacted by the Maryland legislature in 1999 during the term of the previous governor, Parris Glendening, and approved by the former members of the PSC. One of the members of the PSC that approved the rate cap was Joseph Curran III, the brother-in-law of Baltimore mayor and gubernatorial candidate Martin O'Malley, and son of the Maryland Attorney General, Joseph Curran.

The 1999 plan would allow for competition for electricity in Maryland, but called for a rate cap to last until 2006, which turned out to be a rate so low that it discouraged competition. The original plan also would allow for rates to be reset at the end of the capped period, at which time the market forces would determine the going rate for electricity.

In the criticism of Schisler, O'Malley stated that the PSC was a "lapdog for special interests" and demanded that Schisler be removed from his position. In a similar vein, Michael E. Busch, the Speaker of the House for the Maryland House of Delegates, criticized the casual relationship between Schisler and Carville Collins, an industry representative who represented BGE and Pepco Electric. The Democrat's argument was that the Schisler and the rest of the appointees on the commission were too friendly with the industry and not looking out for the interest of the consumers, thus having lost their independence.

In June 2006, the Democratic-controlled Maryland General Assembly passed a law that included the removal of the current members of the PSC. Ken Schisler sued (Kenneth D. Schisler, et al. v. State of Maryland) and won the right to keep his job arguing that only the governor could fire the members of the PSC. The law, had it taken effect, would have allowed the General Assembly to appoint 2 members each by the House and Senate to the PSC, while only allowing the Governor to appoint one member. Currently, the appointment of members of the PSC belongs to the executive branch.

Martin O'Malley won the gubernatorial election in 2006, thus Schisler lost his advocate, Governor Bob Ehrlich. State Senate President Mike Miller tried to negotiate an amicable deal which would have had Schisler removed, but Schisler turned down the offer. O'Malley's chief council, Ralph S. Tyler, said that if Schisler would not resign his position, he could be fired. Under pressure, Schisler eventually resigned on February 2, 2007. Governor Martin O'Malley appointed Steven Larsen to replace Schisler. Larsen is a former Insurance Commissioner for the Maryland Insurance Agency. Larsen was given a salary of $185,000, 58% more than Schisler's salary of $117,000.

The PSC approved a 15% increase that would take effect in July 2006 and be in place for 11 months. This was during the final months of Governor Ehrlich's term. A future increase was to be determined after the election. However, Ehrlich was defeated by Martin O'Malley. With the 11-month period nearly over, a 48% rate hike has been proposed, which when calculated along with the original 15%, is nearly identical to the originally proposed 72% rate hike from 2006. Ironically, the new commissioners under Governor O'Malley accepted this proposal stating that there was no legal way to change these new rates.

== Election results ==
- 2002 electionfor Maryland House of Delegates – District 37B

Voters to choose two:

Name	Votes	Percent	Outcome
Adelaide C. Eckardt, Rep.	21,100	50.2%	Won
Kenneth D. Schisler, Rep.	20,718	49.3%	Won
Other write-ins	200	0.5%	Lost

- 1998 election for Maryland House of Delegates – District 37B

Voters to choose two:

Name	Votes	Percent	Outcome
Adelaide C. Eckardt, Rep.	16,558	42%	Won
Kenneth D. Schisler, Rep.	15,604	40%	Won
William Steven Brohawn, Dem.	7,340	19%	Lost

- 1994 election for Maryland House of Delegates – District 37B

Voters to choose two:

Name	Votes	Percent	Outcome
Adelaide C. Eckardt, Rep.	11,422	27%	Won
Kenneth D. Schisler, Rep.	14,992	35%	Won
Philip Carey Foster, Dem.	6,618	16%	Lost
Robert Alan Thornton Jr, Dem.	9,240	22%	Lost

- 1990 election for Maryland House of Delegates – District 37

Voters to choose three:

Name	Votes	Percent	Outcome
Samuel Q. Johnson, Dem.	12,803	23%	Won
Kenneth D. Schisler, Rep.	11,096	20%	Won
Robert Alan Thornton Jr, Dem.	12,480	23%	Won
Adelaide C. Eckardt, Rep.	9,559	17%	Lost
Don William Bradley, Dem.	9,210	17%	Lost
