= Cynthia C. Morton =

American geneticist

Cynthia Casson Morton (born August 1, 1955) is an American geneticist, professor at Harvard Medical School, and director of cytogenetics at Brigham and Women's Hospital.

== Biography ==
Morton graduated in 1973 from Maryland's Easton High School and in 1977 from the College of William and Mary with a bachelor's degree in biology. In 1982 she received her Ph.D. in human genetics from the Medical College of Virginia.

As a postdoc she worked at Children's Hospital of Boston and then for three-and-a-half years in Philip Leder's laboratory in Harvard Medical School's department of genetics. In 1987, the eminent pathologist Ramzi Cotran recruited her to become the Director of Cytogenetics at Brigham and Women's Hospital. At Harvard Medical School she is now the William Lambert Richardson Professor of Obstetrics, Gynecology and Reproductive Medicine as well as a professor of pathology. At Brigham and Women's Hospital she also holds the Keneth J. Ryan, M.D., Distinguished Chair in Obstetrics and Gynecology. She is an adjunct professor at the University of Manchester.

She has done research on "molecular cytogenetics, hereditary deafness, genetics of uterine leiomyomata and human developmental disorders." The research done by her and her co-workers lead to the "identification of the first gene implicated in uterine fibroids, HMGA2."

Dr. Morton’s research focuses on using genetic information to differentiate the projected clinical course of various tumors. One of these clinical targets is the solid uterine fibroid, a benign tumor that nevertheless affects the majority of women and causes substantial morbidity. Dr. Morton’s laboratory was among the first to elucidate a collection of genetic abnormalities associated with this tumor, as chronicled in a series of papers published in the late 1990s.

Morton founded the Developmental Genome Anatomy Project (DGAP), which searches for molecular causes of developmental disabilities. Morton is the author or co-author of over 300 articles in academic journals. For six years (from 2005 to 2011) she was editor-in-chief of the American Journal of Human Genetics.

She is married and has a daughter and a son.

== Awards and honors ==
- 1997 — Warner-Lamber/Parke-David Award of the American Society for Experimental Pathology
- 2014 — President of the American Society of Human Genetics
- 2015 — Fellow of the American Association for the Advancement of Science
