= Eastern Shore Delegation =

Delegation of the Maryland House of Delegates

The Eastern Shore Delegation refers to the members of the Maryland House of Delegates who reside in or represent legislative districts that are in or include parts of the Eastern Shore of Maryland in the United States of America. Three delegates are elected from each district, though some districts are divided into sub-districts. The counties that are considered to be a part of the Eastern Shore are Caroline County, Cecil County, Dorchester County, Kent County, Queen Anne's County, Somerset County, Talbot County, Wicomico County, and Worcester County.

== Current members ==
District	Counties represented	Delegate	Party	First elected	Committee
34B	Cecil	Susan K. McComas	Republican	2002	Judiciary
35A	Cecil, Harford	Christopher Griffith	Republican	2014	Ways & Means
35A	Cecil, Harford	Teresa E. Reilly	Republican	2014	Health and Government Operations
35B	Cecil	Kevin Hornberger	Republican	2014	Ways and Means
36	Caroline, Cecil, Kent, Queen Anne's	Steven J. Arentz	Republican	2013	Economic Matters
36	Caroline, Cecil, Kent, Queen Anne's	Jay Jacobs	Republican	2002	Environmental & Transportation
36	Caroline, Cecil, Kent, Queen Anne's	Jefferson L. Ghrist	Republican	1994	Appropriations
37A	Dorchester, Wicomico	Sheree Sample-Hughes	Democratic	2014	Health and Government Operations
37B	Caroline, Dorchester, Talbot, Wicomico	Christopher T. Adams	Republican	2014	Economic Matters
37B	Caroline, Dorchester, Talbot, Wicomico	Tom Hutchinson	Republican	2023	Economic Matters
38A	Somerset, Wicomico	Charles J. Otto	Republican	2010	Environment & Transportation
38B	Wicomico, Worcester	Carl Anderton Jr.	Republican	2014	Appropriations
38C	Wicomico, Worcester	Wayne Hartman	Republican	2018	Judiciary

== See also ==
- Current members of the Maryland State Senate
