= Frank Robinson (Canadian football) =

American gridiron football player (born 1959)

Profile
- Position: Linebacker

Personal information
- Born: March 6, 1959 (age 67); Nassawadox, Virginia, U.S.

Career information
- College: Tulane

Career history
- 1981–1983: Saskatchewan Roughriders
- 1984–1985: Winnipeg Blue Bombers
- 1985: Toronto Argonauts
- 1986–1990: Hamilton Tiger-Cats

Awards and highlights
- 2× Grey Cup champion (1984, 1986); CFL All-Star (1989); 2× CFL East All-Star (1987, 1989)

Frank Robinson (born March 6, 1959) is an American former professional football linebacker who played ten seasons in the Canadian Football League (CFL) from 1981 to 1990 with the Saskatchewan Roughriders, Winnipeg Blue Bombers, Toronto Argonauts and Hamilton Tiger-Cats. Robinson was a CFL East All-Star in 1987 and a CFL All-Star in 1989. He played college football for the Tulane Green Wave from 1977 to 1980.
