= Casey Cep =

American journalist

- Born: Eastern Shore of Maryland, U.S.
- Education: Harvard University (AB); University of Oxford (MPhil)
- Occupations: Author; journalist
- Spouse: Kathryn Schulz
- Children: 1
- Website: www.caseycep.com

Casey Cep is an American author and journalist. Cep is a staff writer at The New Yorker, and her work has appeared in The New York Times, The Paris Review, The New Republic, and other publications. Cep's debut non-fiction book, published by Knopf, Furious Hours: Murder, Fraud, and the Last Trial of Harper Lee (2019), tells the story of how Harper Lee worked on, but ultimately failed to publish, an account of a murder trial that happened in Alabama in 1977.

== Biography ==
Cep was born and raised on the Eastern Shore of Maryland. After attending public schools in Talbot County, Maryland public schools, including Easton High School, Cep graduated magna cum laude from Harvard University in 2007 with a degree in English. Cep attended the University of Oxford on a Rhodes Scholarship, earning an M.Phil. in theology. After internships at the New Republic and other publications, she became a staff writer at The New Yorker.

Cep's first book, Furious Hours: Murder, Fraud and the Last Trial of Harper Lee, was published by Knopf in May 2019. The book focuses on the life and criminal trials of Rev. Willie Maxwell – an African American preacher and businessman, five of whose relatives died during the span of seven years, all after he procured life insurance policies for them. Additionally, the book examines the trial of the Reverend's killer, which Harper Lee attended and planned to write about in her final book, though it remained unfinished at the time of her death. The Alabama lawyer, politician, and civil rights pioneer Tom Radney defended Rev. Maxwell during several murder investigations and civil trials for insurance payouts, and subsequently represented his accused killer.

The podcast Criminal spoke with Casey Cep about Rev. Willie Maxwell and Harper Lee's unfinished book in their episode titled "The Reverend."

== Reviews and awards ==
Furious Hours debuted at No. 6 on the New York Times Hardcover Nonfiction Best Sellers List, and is a Books-A-Million President's Pick. The book won the 2020 ALCS Gold Dagger for Non-Fiction and has been shortlisted for the 2019 Baillie Gifford Prize.

In reviewing Furious Hours for the New York Times Book Review, the author Michael Lewis wrote: "She reminded me all over again how much of good storytelling is leading the reader to want to know the things you are about to tell him, while still leaving him to feel that his interest was all his idea." Cep's book, he said, "makes a magical little leap, and it goes from being a superbly written true-crime story to the sort of story that even Lee would have been proud to write." The New York Times selected Furious Hours for its "100 Notable Books of 2019."

According to NPR's Ilana Masad, "Furious Hours delivers a gripping, incredibly well-written portrait of not only Harper Lee, but also of mid-20th century Alabama – and a still-unanswered set of crimes to rival the serial killers made infamous in the same time period."

Time's Lucas Wittman writes, "In elegant prose, [Cep] gives us the fullest story yet of Lee’s post-Mockingbird life ... an account emotionally attuned to the toll that great writing takes, and shows that sometimes one perfect book is all we can ask for, even while we wish for another."

President Barack Obama selected Furious Hours as one of his favorite books of 2019.

== Personal life ==
Cep was born and raised on the Eastern Shore of Maryland, where she now lives with her wife, fellow New Yorker staff writer Kathryn Schulz, and their baby daughter. As Cep herself has said, "I grew up in the Lutheran Church, and I often say that Sunday services were my first book club, because week after week very thoughtful, very loving people gathered around the same book and tried to figure out what it meant. I was steeped in scripture as a kid, and I’ve devoted quite a lot of my adult life to studying religion and theology, so I find it is one of the great themes that interests me — not only as a writer, but as a person in the world, trying to figure out how to be a good partner and community member and citizen of the cosmos. I end up writing about it so much because I think about it so much."

== Bibliography ==
=== Books ===
- Cep, Casey (2019). Furious hours : murder, fraud, and the last trial of Harper Lee. Knopf.

=== Essays and reporting ===
- Cep, Casey (May 31, 2021). "Kindred spirits : why did so many Victorians try to talk with the dead?". The Critics. Books. The New Yorker. 97 (14): 67–71. (Note: Online version is titled "Why did so many Victorians try to speak with the dead?".)
