= Benjamin Chew Howard =

American politician

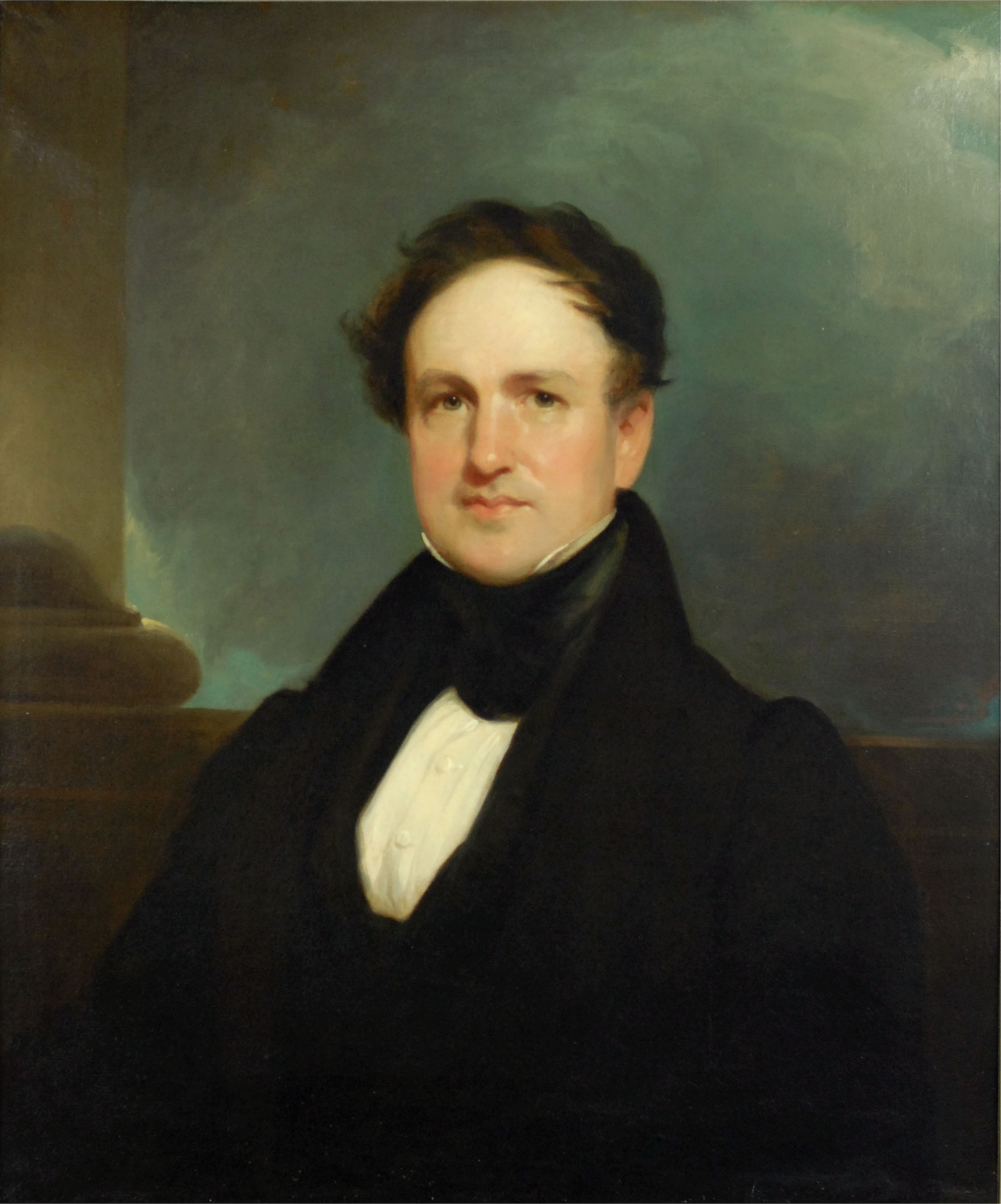
- portrait by Henry Inman
- Born: November 5, 1791; Baltimore County
- Died: March 6, 1872; Baltimore
- Resting place: Green Mount Cemetery
- Education: Princeton University
- Occupations: Politician, lawyer
- Spouse: Jane Gilmor Howard
- Parents: John Eager Howard (father); Peggy Chew Howard (mother)
- Relatives: George Howard

Benjamin Chew Howard (November 5, 1791 – March 6, 1872) was an American politician and lawyer. After serving on the city council of Baltimore in 1820 and in both houses of the Maryland legislature, he was a Representative in the United States Congress from 1829 to 1833, and from 1835 to 1839. He was thereafter the fifth reporter of decisions of the United States Supreme Court, serving from 1843 to 1860.

== Early life and education ==
Howard was born at Belvidere in Baltimore County, Maryland, the son of John Eager Howard and Margaret ("Peggy") Chew, daughter of Benjamin Chew. He received an A.B. from Princeton University in 1809. In 1812 he attended and graduated from Litchfield Law School in Connecticut.

=== War of 1812 ===
During 1814, the last year of the War of 1812 he served as a Captain in the First Mechanical Volunteers, a company of the 5th Maryland Regiment at the Battle of North Point. The battle would become the turning point of the War. He remained in the service and later he reached the rank of brigadier general in the Maryland militia.

== Marriage and family ==
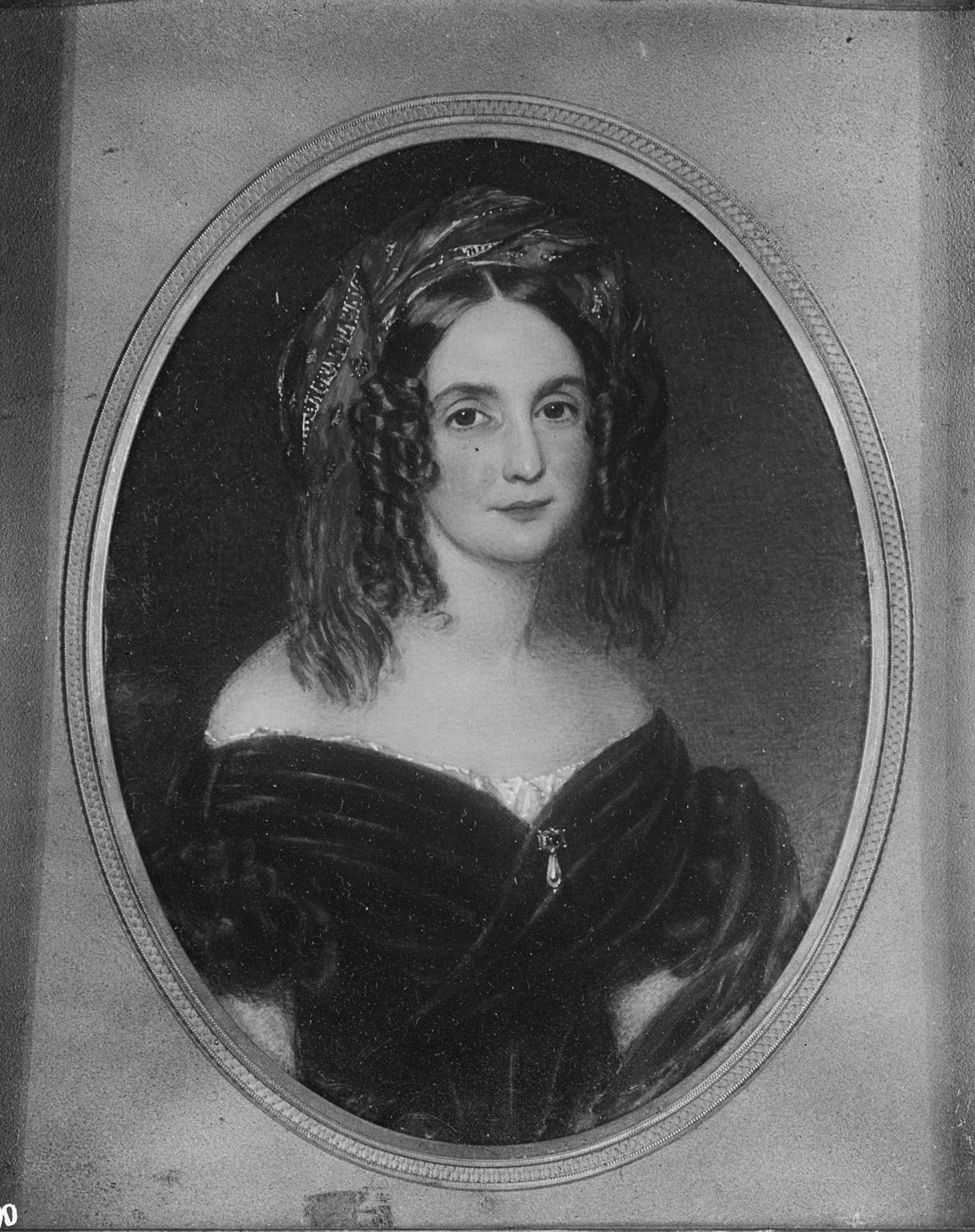
Jane Gilmor Howard, author of Fifty Years in a Maryland Kitchen

Among his siblings were George Howard, Governor of Maryland; Dr. William Howard, a civil engineer and architect; and Charles who with his son Francis Key Howard, were imprisoned in Fort McHenry at the start of the American Civil War. In 1818 he married Jane Gilmor, who would write a charity cookbook and after the Civil War lead a successful fundraising fair. They had twelve children.

== Political life ==
A Democrat, he served on the city council of Baltimore in 1820 and in both houses of the Maryland legislature. He was elected to the Twenty-first and Twenty-second United States Congress, serving from March 4, 1829 to March 3, 1833. In 1835, President Andrew Jackson named Richard Rush and Howard to arbitrate the Ohio-Michigan boundary dispute.

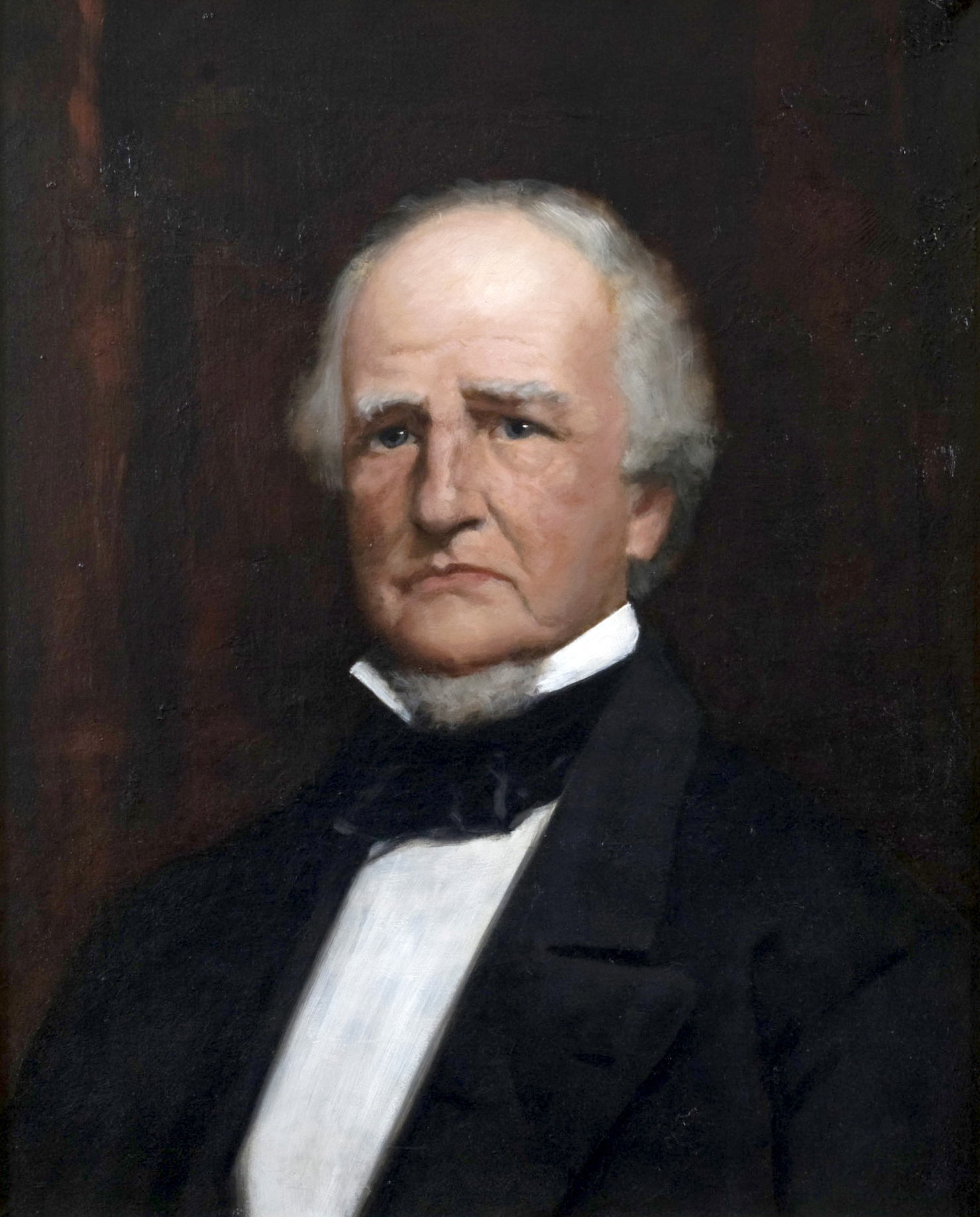
Posthumous Portrait by Robert Cutler Hinckley, c. 1890

He returned to Congress in the Twenty-fourth Congress and was re-elected to the Twenty-fifth, serving from March 4, 1835, to March 3, 1839. During this service, he chaired the House Foreign Relations Committee for four years.

In 1861, he was one of the emissaries sent by outgoing President James Buchanan to try to secure a peace with the Confederacy. That year he unsuccessfully ran for Governor of Maryland. He died in Baltimore at his home on March 6, 1872 and is buried in Greenmount Cemetery.

=== United States Reports ===
Starting with the 42nd volume of United States Reports, Howard was the Reporter of Decisions of the Supreme Court of the United States, serving from 1843 to 1860. His term covered volumes 42 through 65 of US Reports, corresponding to volumes 1 through 24 of his nominative Howard's Reports. As such, the dual form of citation to, for example, the Supreme Court decision in Williams v. United States is 42 U.S. (1 How.) 290 (1843).

== See also ==
- Court reporter
- Lists of United States Supreme Court cases by volume

Party political offices
Preceded by John C. Groome	Democratic nominee for Governor of Maryland; 1861	Succeeded by Ezekiel F. Chambers
U.S. House of Representatives
Preceded by John Barney and Peter Little	Member of the U.S. House of Representatives from Maryland's 5th congressional district 1829–1833	Succeeded by Isaac McKim
Preceded by James P. Heath	Member of the U.S. House of Representatives from Maryland's 4th congressional district 1835–1839	Succeeded by James Carroll and Solomon Hillen
Legal offices
Preceded by Richard Peters	United States Supreme Court Reporter of Decisions; 1843–1860	Succeeded by Jeremiah S. Black
