= Peggy Chew Howard =

First Lady of Maryland

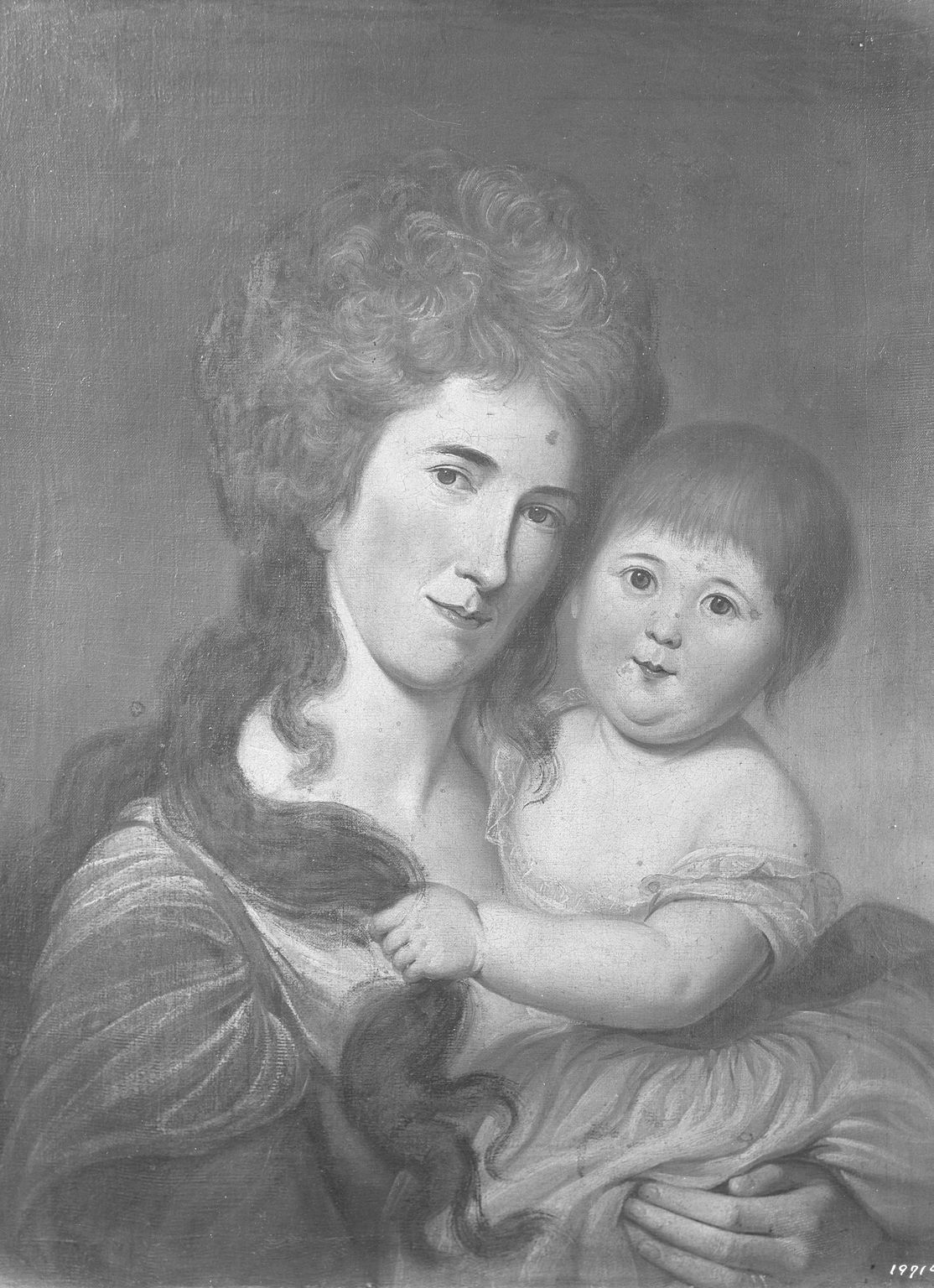
- Peggy Chew Howard and her son, John Eager Howard II. Portrait by Charles Willson Peale.
- Born: Margaret Oswald Chew; December 16, 1760; Germantown, Philadelphia, Pennsylvania, U.S.
- Died: May 29, 1824 (aged 63); Baltimore, Maryland, U.S.
- Spouse: John Eager Howard (m. 1787)
- Children: 9, including George, Benjamin, and William
- Father: Benjamin Chew

Peggy Chew Howard (December 16, 1760 – May 29, 1824) was the First Lady of the 5th Governor of Maryland, John Eager Howard.

== Early life ==
Margaret "Peggy" Oswald Chew was born on December 16, 1760, at Cliveden, the Chew family estate, in Germantown, Philadelphia, Pennsylvania. Her parents were Elizabeth (née Oswald) and Benjamin Chew, Pennsylvania Attorney General and Chief Justice of the Supreme Court of Pennsylvania. She grew up in the high society of early 18th-century Philadelphia, and her siblings and she were treated by General George Washington as "if they were his own children".

== Personal life ==
Chew was pursued by a number of suitors, including Major John André. He courted her by inviting her as his escort to The Mischianza, a fête on May 18, 1778, that he helped plan in honor of Sir William Howe. Also, in attendance at The Mischianza was her friend and the later wife of Benedict Arnold, Peggy Shippen. André presented Peggy Chew with a souvenir manuscript of the evening and poetry upon his departure from Philadelphia. He was later found guilty of spying alongside Benedict Arnold and he was hanged on October 2, 1780. Peggy Shippen would use the letters sent by Peggy Chew to André to "interline" secret messages in invisible ink that could be read by André in British-occupied New York City.

Chew then met John Eager Howard at her home during a battle of the Revolutionary War. He was wounded during the Battle of Eutaw Springs and sent letters via his physician, Dr. Craik, to woo her into engagement. In May 1787, she married John Eager Howard. George Washington took note of the ceremony and reception in his diary.

Peggy would reminisce about André's courting of her to her husband, John Eager Howard, which would infuriate him. Later in life, he is quoted as saying "He was a damned spy, sir, nothing but a damned spy", in reference to his wife's former suitor.

Together, Peggy and John Eager Howard had 9 children:

- John Eager Howard Jr. – served in the War of 1812; had a son, John Eager Howard III that led the Battle of Chapultepec during the Mexican–American War
- George Howard – followed in his father's footsteps and became the 22nd Governor of Maryland.
- Benjamin Chew Howard – U.S. congressman and served in the War of 1812
- William Howard – physician; designer of the Baltimore and Ohio Railroad; one of the first Americans to reach the peak of Mont Blanc
- Charles Howard – president of the Baltimore and Susquehanna Railroad
- James Howard
- Juliana Elizabeth
- Sophia Catherine
- Mary Anne

== First Lady ==
A hero of the Battle of Cowpens, John Eager Howard was selected to fill the position of Governor of Maryland from 1788 to 1791. During this time, they lived at the Jennings House in Annapolis.

== Later life and death ==
Her husband would then serve in the Maryland Senate and U.S. Senate. They retired to their home, the Belvedere, on Calvert Street in Baltimore in 1816. They would host a number of distinguished guests at the Belvedere, including George Washington, Charles Carroll of Carrollton, Samuel Chase, Roger B. Taney, Marquis de Lafayette, and Generals Gist, Smallwood, and Williams.

Peggy Howard died on May 29, 1824, at the age of 63. She was survived by her husband, who didn't die until October 12, 1827.
