= Government House (Maryland) =

Coordinates: 38.979091°N 76.491934°W

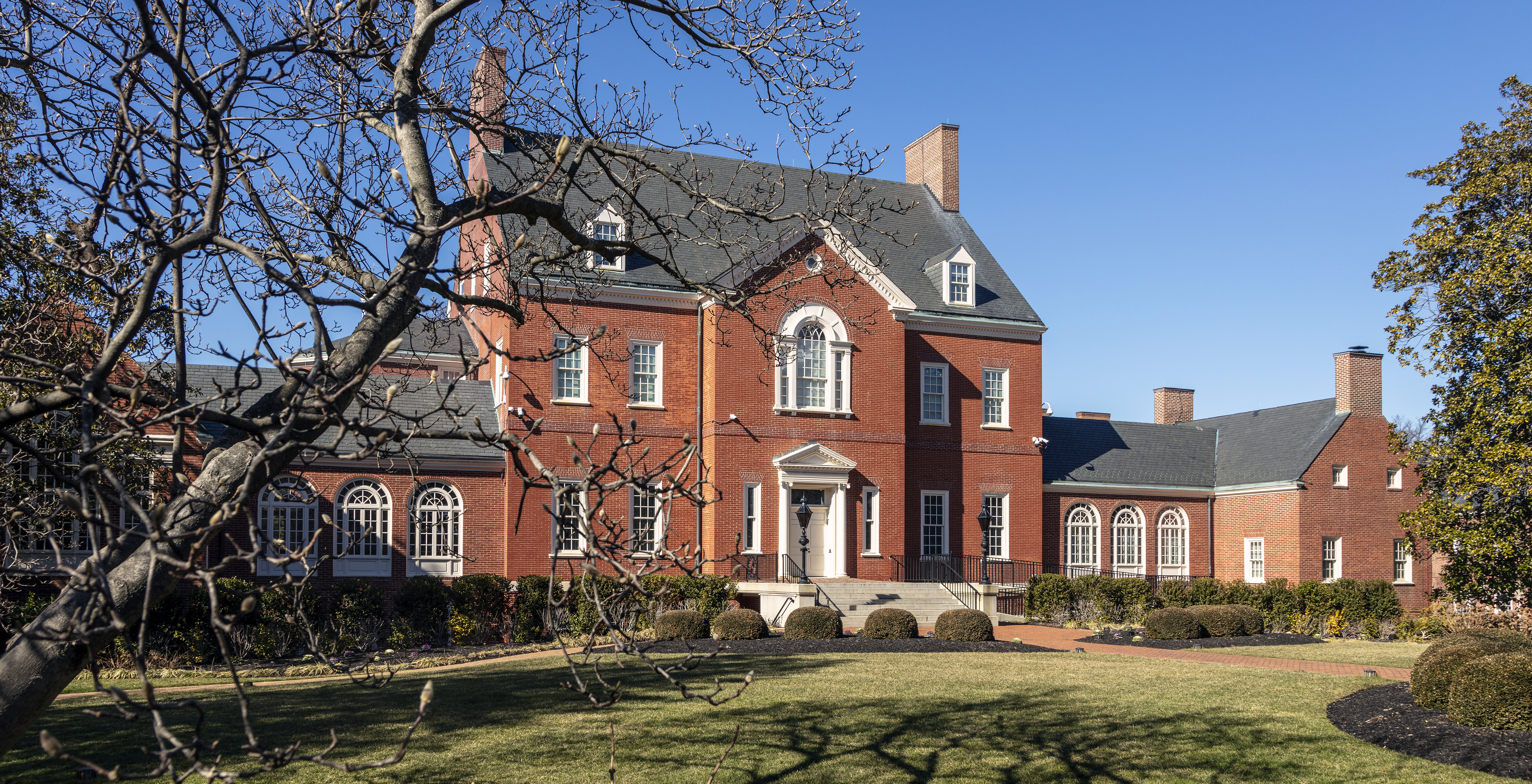
- Maryland Government House in 2022

General information
- Location: State Circle; Annapolis, Maryland (Anne Arundel County)
- Completed: 1870 (renovated/rebuilt 1935-1936)

Design and construction
- Architect: Richard / R. Snowden Andrews (1830-1903)

Government House (also occasionally known as the Governor's Mansion), is the official residence of the governor of Maryland. It is located on State Circle in the state capital town of Annapolis, Maryland. It is adjacent to State Circle from the historic Maryland State House and surrounding legislative buildings complex for the bicameral General Assembly of Maryland (state legislature).

== Description ==
The residence has been the home of the Governor of the "Old Line State" since being constructed and completed in 1870; before that, from 1777 until 1869/1870, the Jennings House mansion was the official residence of the previous governors of Maryland.

The former site of Jennings House is now on the current campus of the nearby United States Naval Academy (established in Annapolis in 1845), which purchased the mansion in 1869 for $20,000 (20 thousand dollars). The Academy used the old Jennings House residence for a number of purposes for the next three decades, before finally razing it in 1901, making room for its expanded waterfront campus built on reclaimed landfill acreage.

Government House of Maryland in Annapolis was designed by Baltimore architect R. Snowden Andrews (1830–1903). Originally designed by Andrews, a former Confederate States Army officer during the American Civil War (1861–1865). Besides Victorian architecture, architect Andrews used two complementary styles of Victorian and French Second Empire style architecture with a traditional mansard style roof of slate wedges, elaborate white carved wood cornices / trim especially on porches and side-door driveway roof and also added features of Italianate style for the arched windows. The mansion was constructed with four levels of a raised basement / cellar, first and second residential floors, with a top attic level under sloping slate mansard-style roof.

It was renovated 60 years later in a 1935–1936 major make-over during the Great Depression and the happier event of the state's 300th Anniversary / Terrcentenary celebration. The architects then went back to Maryland and Annapolis historical roots to restore the official residence of the Governor to completely alter and go to a different Georgian / Colonial Revival and Federal of compatible styles of architecture to match the general style of the nearby historic red brick and unique / distinctive white wooden dome of the then 157-year-old State House, across State Circle, and designed / constructed in the 1770s–1780s period and similar to much of surrounding colonial era Annapolis historic district buildings. Maryland's Government House appearance changed dramatically in the reconstruction / renovation project under successive gubernatorial administrations of then two Maryland Governors of 49th – Albert C. Ritchie (1875–1936, served 1920–1935) – Democrat; and 50th – Harry W. Nice (1877–1941, served 1935–1939) – Republican.

== Gallery ==
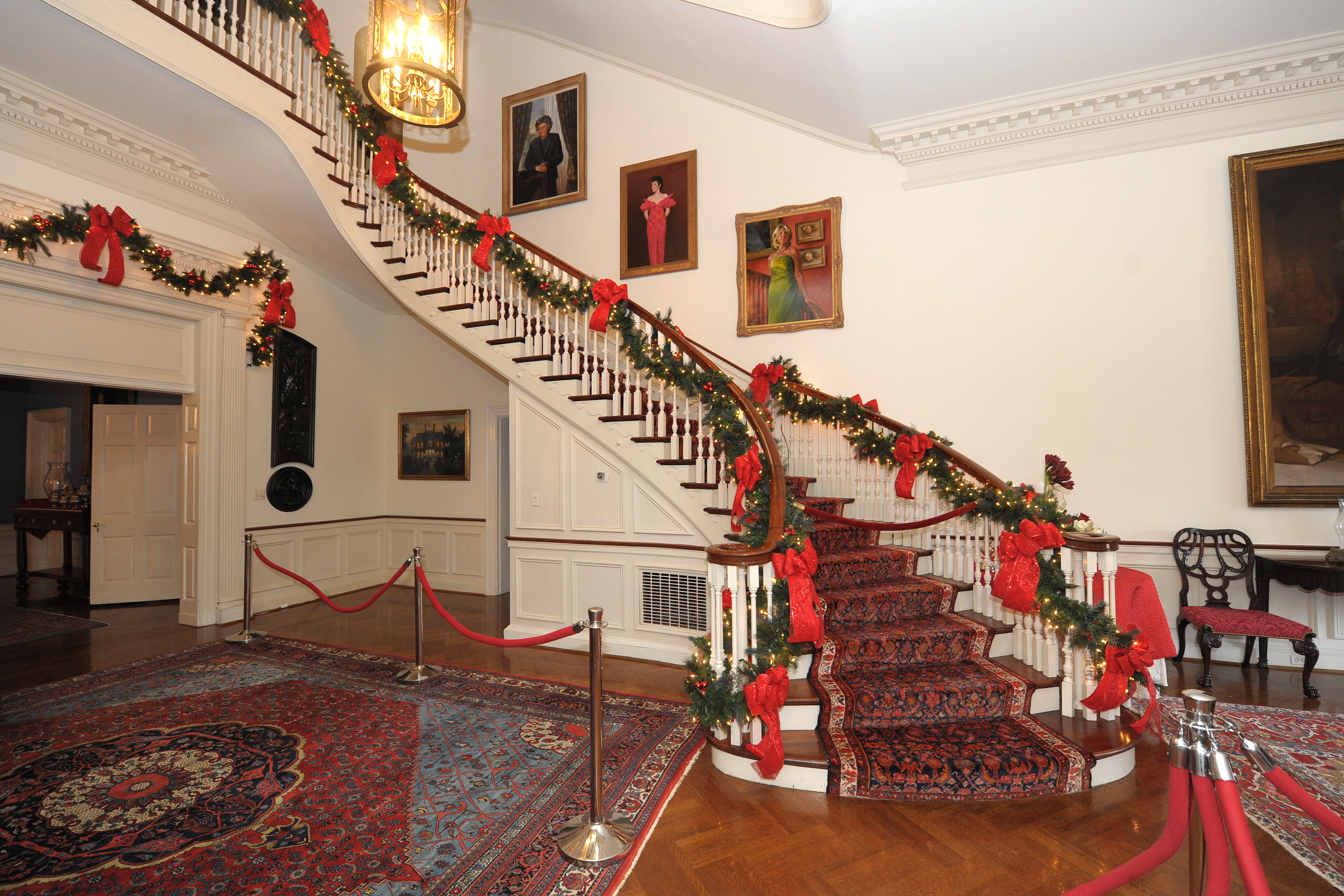
Grand Staircase

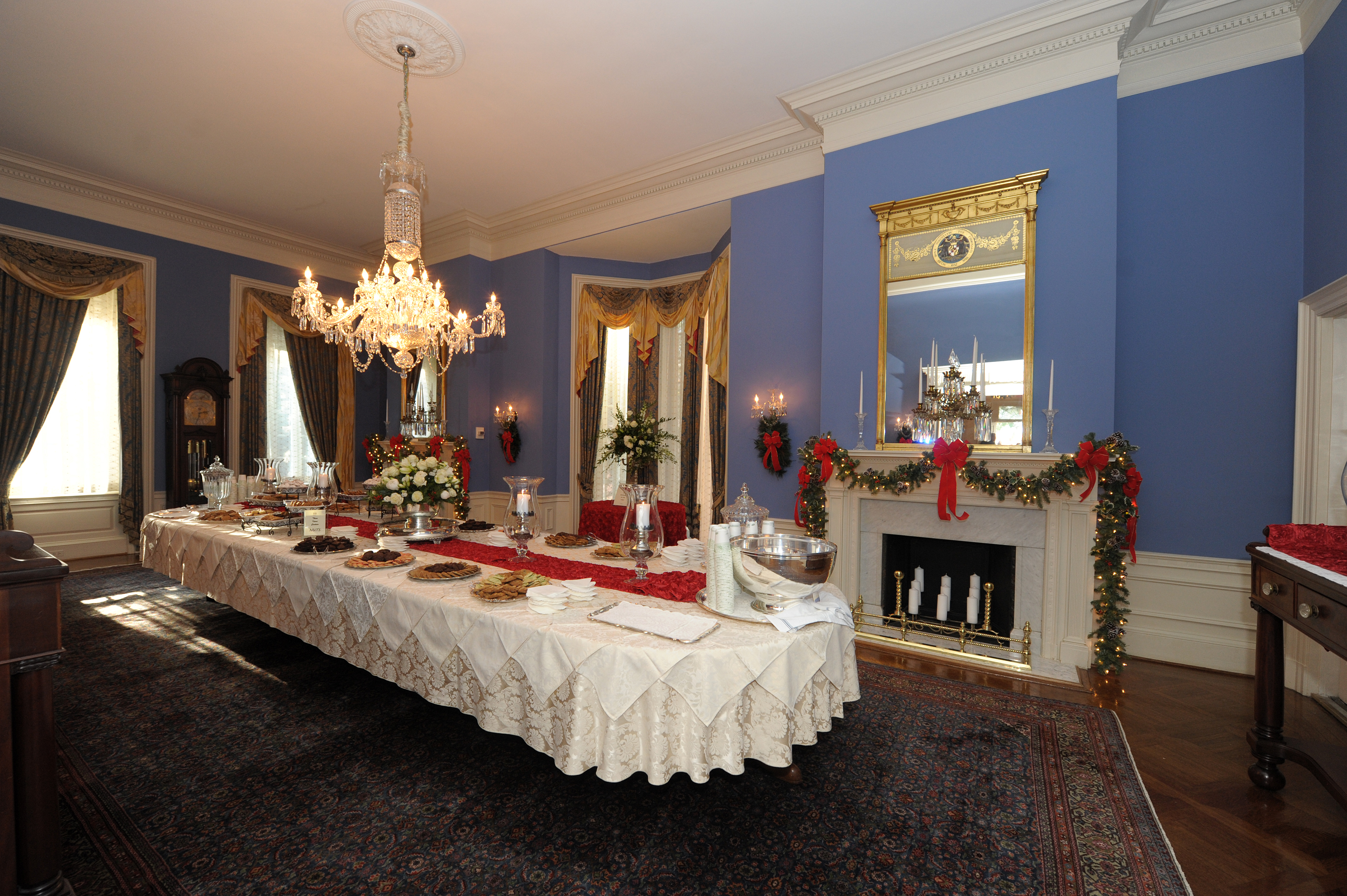
Dining Hall

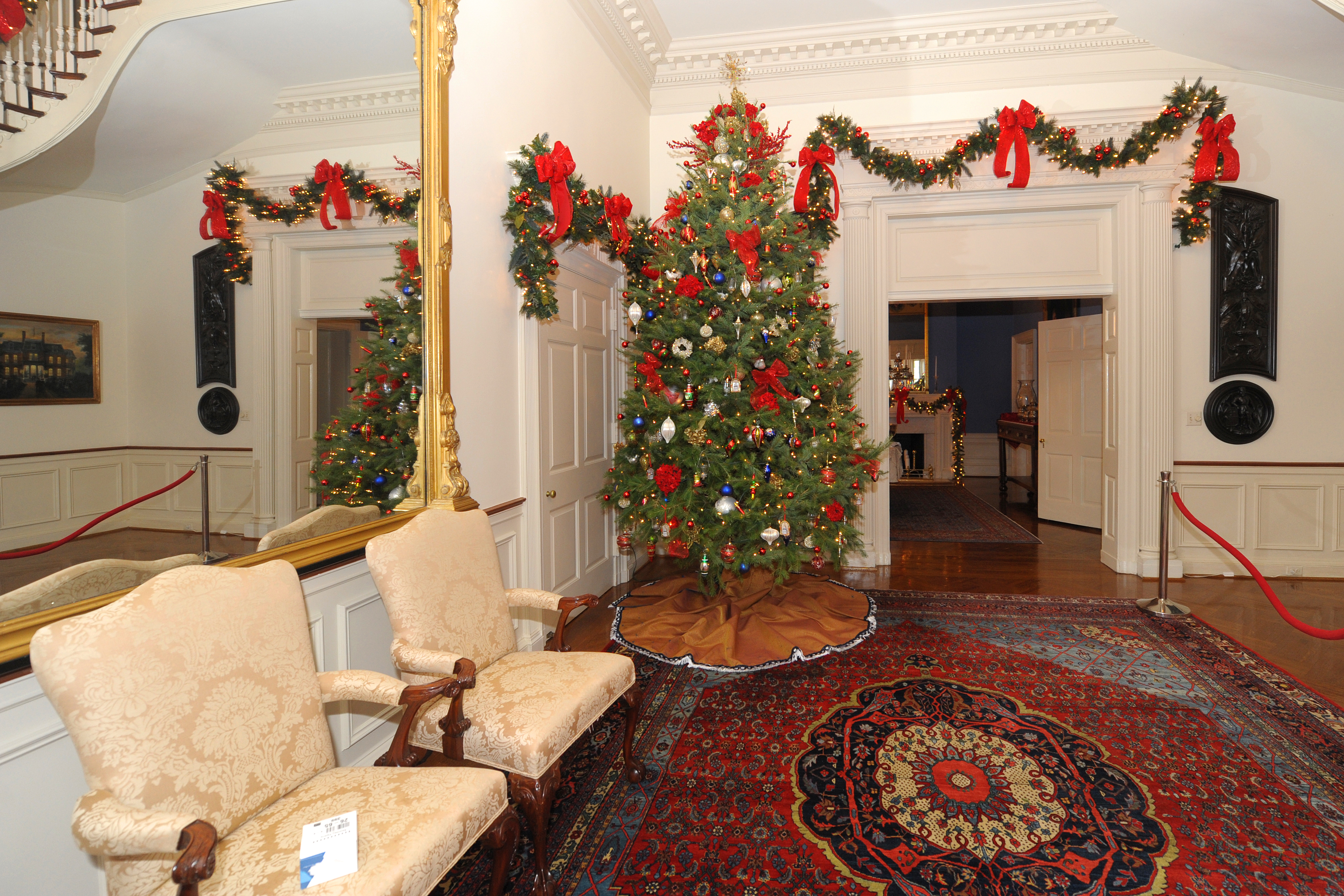
Sitting Room

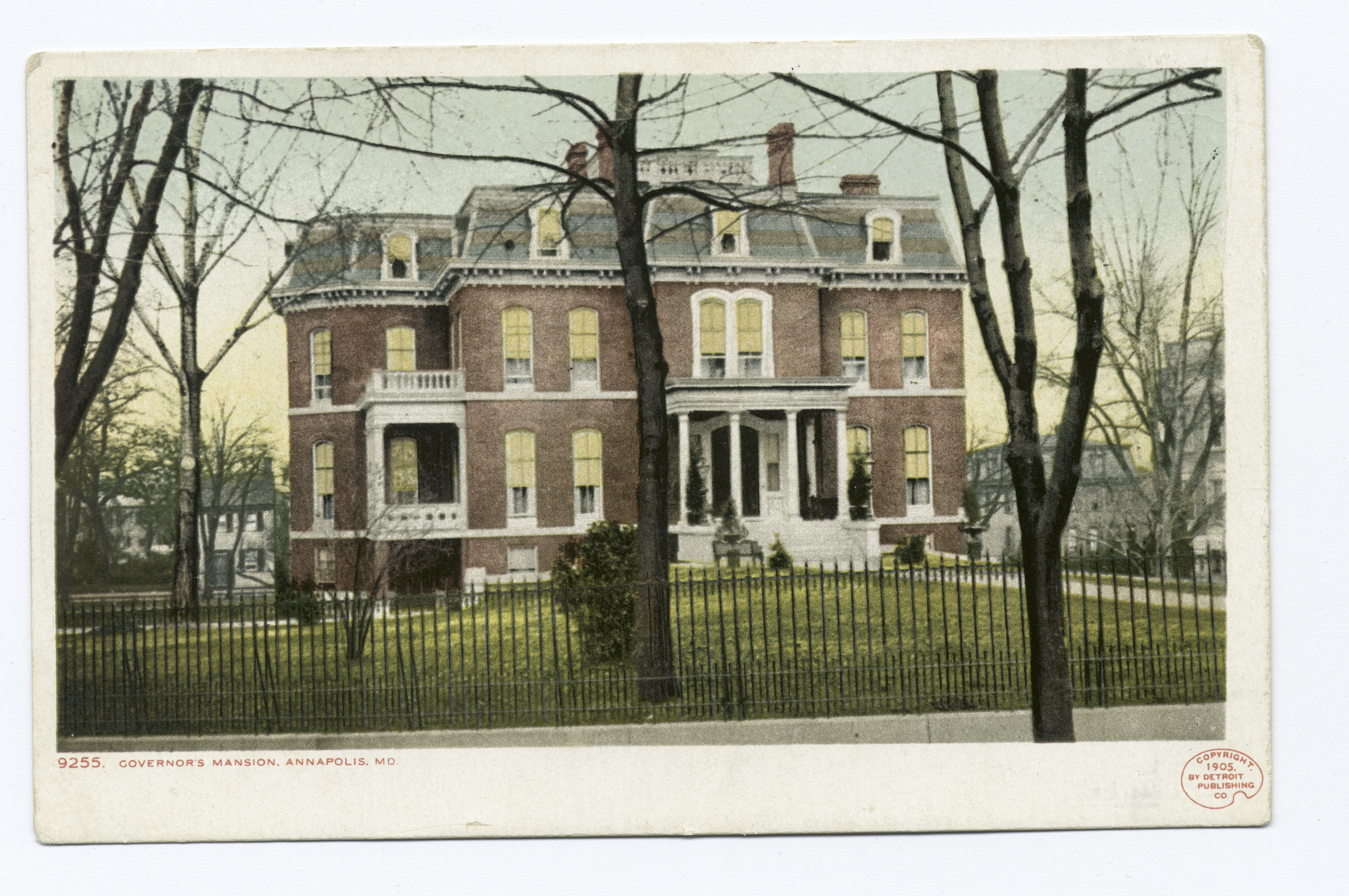
Pictured here from c. 1870 to 1934, as originally designed and constructed as a Victorian / French Second Empire and Italianate varied styles of architecture from the 1870s era mansion, designed by noted Baltimore and Maryland architect, Richard Snowden Andrews (1830–1903).
