= Sojourner–Douglass College =

College founded in 1972 in Baltimore, Maryland, US

- Former name: Homestead-Montebello Center (of Antioch College)
- Type: Private university
- Active: 1972–June 30, 2015
- Affiliations: Antioch College (1972–1978), Antioch University (1978–1980)
- President: Charles Simmons
- Undergraduates: Yes
- Postgraduates: Yes
- Location: Baltimore, Maryland, United States; 39.294°N 76.600°W
- Campus: Urban (with satellite campuses in multiple cities)
- Website: Archived website

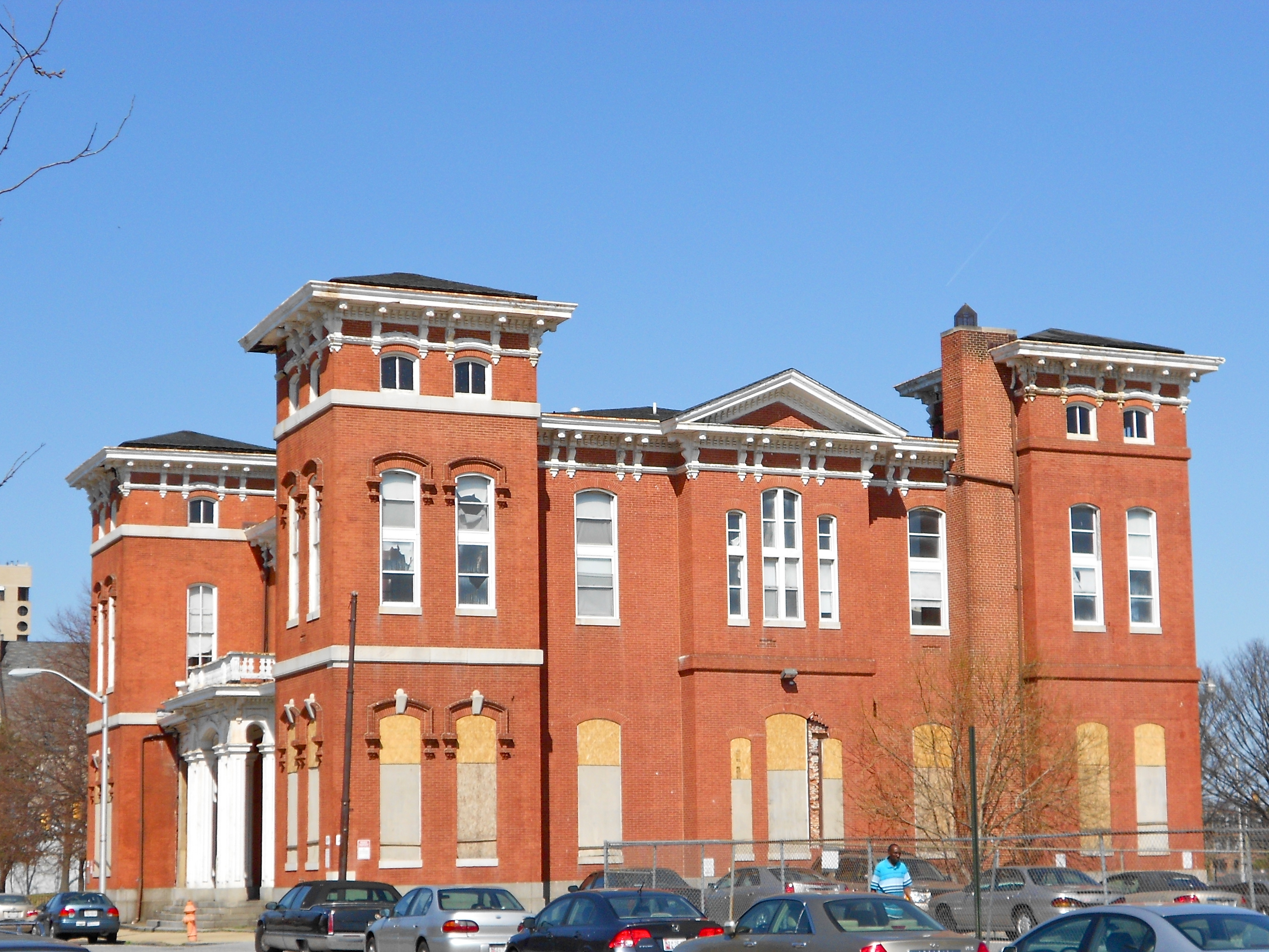
Eastern Female High School

Sojourner–Douglass College was a private college organized around an Afrocentric focus of study and located in Baltimore, Maryland, United States. The college was founded in 1972 and focused on educating mature students. The college's accreditation was revoked by the Middle States Association of Colleges and Schools effective June 30, 2015, and the college remains closed for instruction.

== History ==
Established as part of the Antioch Network in 1972 as the Homestead-Montebello Center of Antioch College, the institution became an independent entity with a four-year program on July 1, 1980, and was named in honor of African-American abolitionists Sojourner Truth and Frederick Douglass.

The college took possession of the Eastern Female High School building in 2003 from the municipal government after the college paid $150,000.

=== Loss of accreditation and closing ===
The college suffered from financial difficulties with its regional accreditation being threatened several times. In March 2014, Sojourner was placed on "show cause" status with the Middle States Association of Colleges and Schools. It had until September 1, 2015, to convince its accreditor not to revoke its accreditation.

On June 29, 2015, Sojourner–Douglass College filed for a 14-day temporary restraining order against Middle States Commission on Higher Education, which was denied on June 30, 2015. On July 1, 2015, Sojourner–Douglass College sued the Middle States Commission on Higher Education for violating the Civil Rights Act of 1866 by revoking their accreditation. On August 24, 2015, U.S. District Judge Ellen Lipton Hollander ruled against restoring Sojourner-Douglass's accreditation, while the college's lawsuit against the Middle States Commission on Higher Education was allowed to move forward. In addition to denying the request for an injunction, Hollander dismissed two counts in the lawsuit, racial discrimination and breach of contract, without prejudice. She gave the college 17 days to revise the lawsuit.

In May 2016 the College listed its main 185,703-square-foot (17,252.4 m^{2}) central campus as well as its secondary 34,761-square-foot (3,229.4 m^{2}) administrative building for sale. In August 2016, the City of Baltimore listed the Eastern Female building on a foreclosure auction and sold it in 2017 despite the college leadership's objections.

The satellite campus in Nassau, Bahamas, closed on July 29, 2016.

== Administration ==
Charles Simmons was the institution's first and only president. In 2013, he was recognized "for a lifetime of dedication to reducing inequalities" at the Second Annual Symposium on the Social Determinants of Health.

== Academics ==
Sojourner–Douglass College's bachelor's degree programs were geared toward adult learners. S-DC also offered a master's degree in applied social science. It was accredited by the Maryland Higher Education Commission.

== Campuses ==
Satellite campuses were located in other areas in Maryland (Annapolis, Cambridge, Salisbury, Owings Mills, and Lanham) as well as in Nassau, Bahamas.

On September 23, 2016, the former main campus, in Baltimore, suffered a two-alarm fire, with heavy smoke and moderate fire on the third floor. The fire took about 30 minutes to get under control. No injuries were reported, as the building had been unoccupied since the college closed in 2015.

== See also ==
- List of colleges and universities in Maryland
