= Richard Snowden Andrews =

Confederate Army officer, architect and diplomat (1830–1903)

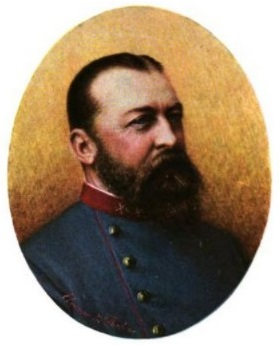
- Portrait by Hallwig
- Born: October 29, 1830; District of Columbia, U.S.
- Died: January 6, 1903 (aged 72); Baltimore, Maryland, U.S.
- Burial place: Green Mount Cemetery, Baltimore, Maryland, U.S.
- Spouse: Mary Catherine Lee
- Relatives: Col. Timothy Andrews (father); Col. Charles Marshall (brother-in-law)
- Military career
- Allegiance: Confederate States of America
- Branch: Confederate States Army
- Service years: 1861–1865
- Rank: Colonel
- Unit: First Maryland Light Artillery
- Conflicts: American Civil War; Seven Days Battles; Battle of Cedar Mountain
- Occupation: Architect
- Practice: 1857–1879
- Buildings: Eastern Female High School; Maryland Governor's Residence; Weston State Hospital

Richard Snowden Andrews (October 29, 1830 – January 6, 1903) was an American architect and a Confederate artillery commander and diplomat during the American Civil War.

== Early life ==
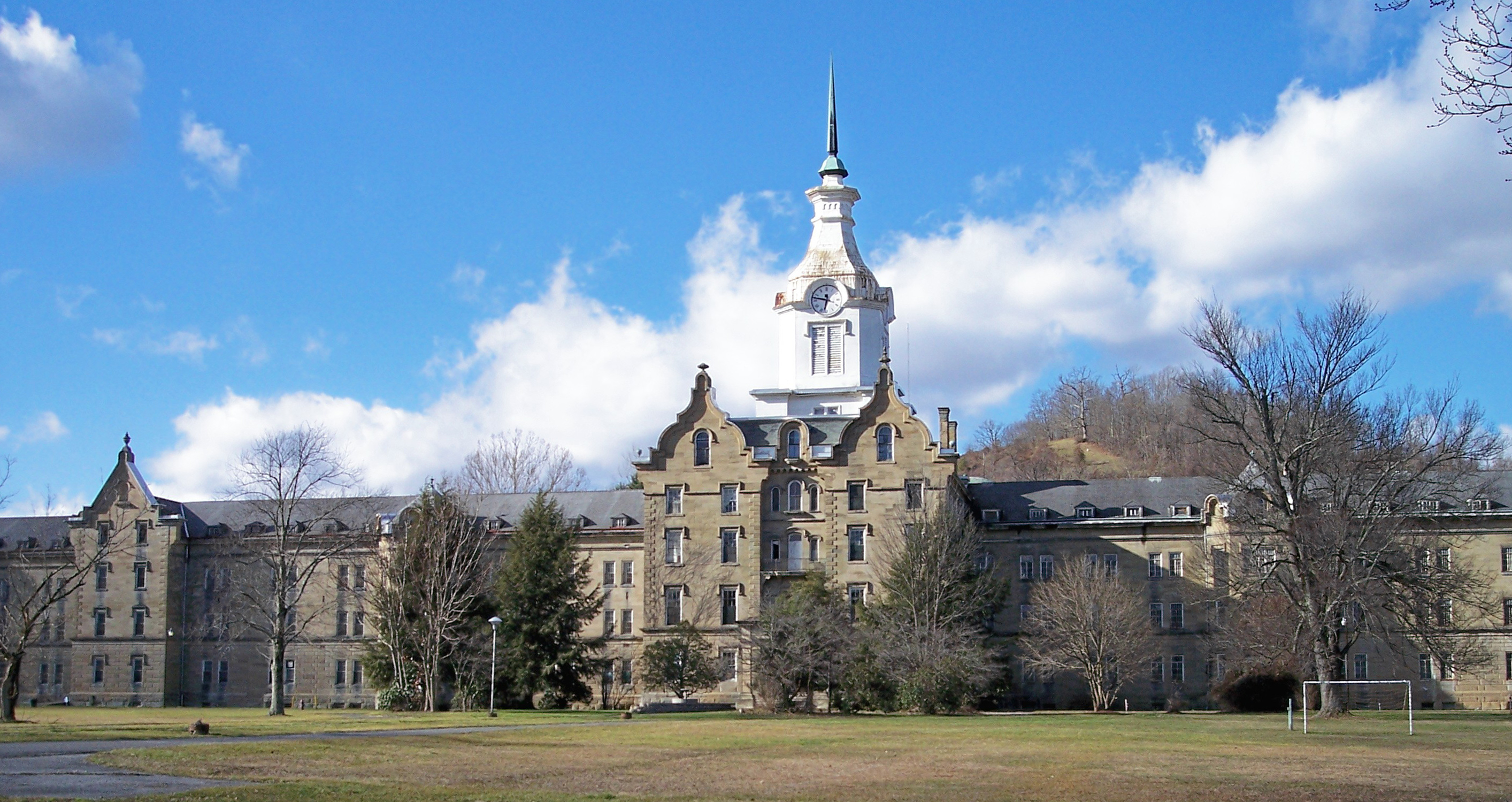
Weston State Hospital

As recorded on the 1850 U.S. census, Andrews was born in the District of Columbia and later moved to Baltimore, Maryland. He was the son of Colonel Timothy Andrews. A prolific antebellum architect, he designed the Weston State Hospital in West Virginia, the largest hand-cut stone building in America, in Gothic Revival and Tudor Revival styles. His other commissions included the Maryland Governor's residence in Annapolis and the south wing of the U.S. Treasury Building in Washington, D.C.

Andrews's sister married Virginian Charles Marshall, who would become a key member of Robert E. Lee's staff during the war.

== Civil War ==
During the Civil War, Andrews organized the First Maryland Light Artillery. He was later promoted to major in charge of a battalion of artillery batteries. Andrews was first wounded during the Seven Days Battles in July 1862.

In August of that year, the 31-year-old major was in charge of General Charles S. Winder's divisional artillery. On August 9, at the Battle of Cedar Mountain in Virginia, a Federal shell exploded close by, which nearly disemboweled Andrews when fragments struck his right side. Holding in his intestines with one hand and sliding from his horse, he fell to the ground and landed on his back. He lay there for hours before being sent to hospital. When surgeons examined him, they all insisted that the wound was fatal. In one account, the hospital surgeon insisted that there would be but one chance in a hundred of his survival. Reportedly Andrews answered, "Well, I am going to hold on to my one chance." The surgeon sewed him up with needle and thread and left him his one chance. Within eight months, and after being fitted with a silver plate over his wound, he returned to his unit. But luck left him again at the Second Battle of Winchester when he was wounded once more. Around this time, Snowden received the commission of colonel. After recovery from this third wound, he was assigned as an envoy to Germany.

Andrews was sent to Germany near the end of the Civil War to negotiate with the Germans for arms. He, along with another Confederate envoy, had little luck with the German High Command in getting those arms and split up. Andrews stayed with the High Command. The story goes that when one evening at a dinner party Andrews showed the underlings of General von Moltke, Otto von Bismarck's chief military advisor, his wound, the advisors were so impressed that he had survived, they called in von Moltke (who was in the adjoining room). Von Moltke, in turn, was so impressed with the wound and Andrews's bravery, he immediately agreed to sell the Confederacy the armaments they wanted. Ironically, as Andrews was returning to catch a ship west, and before delivery was taken of the arms, the South surrendered at Appomattox (April 1865).

== Later life ==
Andrews vowed never to return to the United States. He went, instead, to Mexico, where he took a position in Emperor Maximillian's Army and the rank of General. However, very soon, in 1867, on the execution of Maximillian, Andrews returned to the United States and to his properties in Maryland. He then married and raised a family. One further irony General Richard Snowden Andrews was to suffer was that his daughter, Carolyn Snowden Andrews, was to marry Gibson Fahnestock, son of Harris C. Fahnestock, the famed New York Banker (the Smithsonian Collection of photographs has a 1917 press photograph of Mrs. Gibson Fahnestock at a horseshow). The irony was that Harris C. Fahnestock, an employee of J. Covey, the financier, was an enthusiastic salesman of Union war bonds during the Civil War and is quipped in some circles to have personally ensured the Union victory through this enthusiastic sale of bonds.

Andrews died on January 6, 1903, at his home on West North Avenue in Baltimore. He was buried in Green Mount Cemetery.

The Maryland Center for History and Culture in Baltimore, Maryland, has some of Andrews's clothing, including the coat he was wearing when he was so very badly wounded. Two other pieces of Andrews's clothing came up for auction in 2012.

== Selected works ==
- 1857: Parsonage of Franklin Street Presbyterian Church, 504 Cathedral St., Baltimore, Maryland, listed on the National Register of Historic Places (NRHP)
- 1858–1864: Weston State Hospital, Weston, West Virginia, NRHP-listed
- 1867–1870: Eastern Female High School, Baltimore, Maryland, NRHP-listed
- 1870: Maryland Governor's Residence, Annapolis, Maryland
- South wing of the U.S. Treasury Building in Washington, D.C.
