= Eastern Female High School =

- U.S. National Register of Historic Places
- Baltimore City Landmark
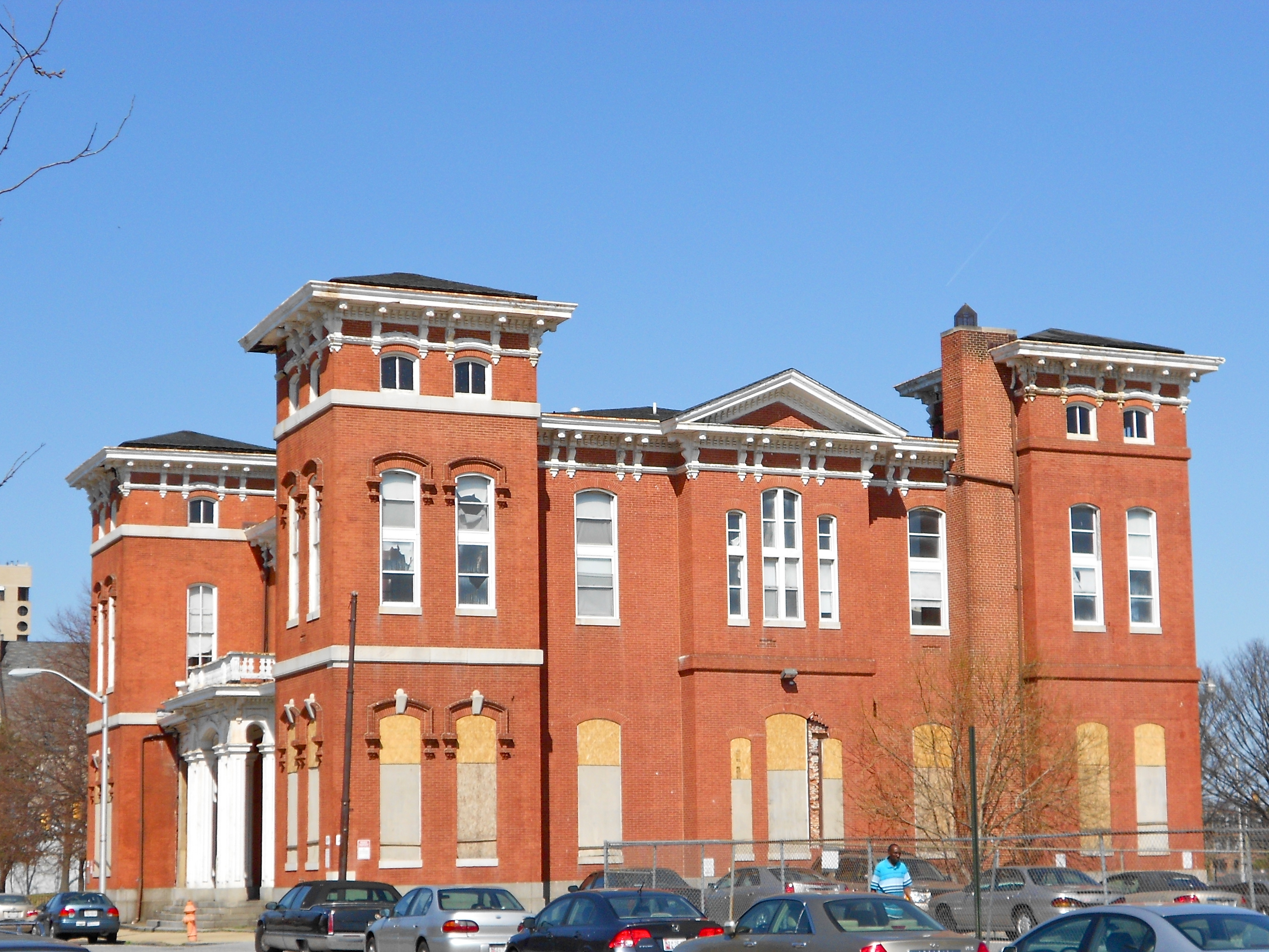
- Empty building in March 2012

- Location within Baltimore Location within Maryland Location within the United States
- Location: 249 Aisquith Street, at Orleans Street, Baltimore, Maryland
- Coordinates: 39°17′40″N 76°36′05″W
- Area: 1.4 acres (0.57 ha)
- Built: 1869
- Architect: Andrews, Col. R. Snowden
- Architectural style: Italian Villa
- NRHP reference No.: 71001035

Significant dates
- Added to NRHP: September 10, 1971
- Designated BCL: 1971

Eastern Female High School, also known as Public School No. 116, is a historic female high school located on the southeast corner of the 200 block of North Aisquith Street and Orleans Street, in the old Jonestown / Old Town neighborhoods, east of Downtown Baltimore and now adjacent to the recently redeveloped Pleasant View Gardens housing project / neighborhood of Baltimore, Maryland, United States. It was built in 1869-1870 and is typical of the Italian Villa mode of late 19th-century architecture. It was dedicated in a large ceremony with speeches later published in a printed pamphlet and attending crowds in early 1870. Old Eastern High is a two-story brick structure that features a square plan, three corner towers (northwest, southwest, southeast), and elaborate bracketing cornices, with a similar wood decorated porch/portico over front entrance on its west side facing Aisquith Street.

Eastern Female High School was founded (along with its twin sister secondary school Western High School) in 1844 and was one of the pioneer high schools in the country devoted to secondary education for women. It was designed by Baltimore architect Colonel R. Snowden Andrews (1830-1903), also a former officer in the Confederate States Army during the American Civil War.

In 1907, the girls high school moved to larger, better equipped quarters further northeast in the city at the southeast corner of Broadway and East North Avenue (the former Samuel Gompers Vocational High School building, 1938–1953), where it remained for another three decades until 1938, when it moved to East 33rd Street and Loch Raven Boulevard (Eastern High School (Baltimore)), until it closed in the late 1980s. Then the old girls school building on Aisquith and Orleans was used as an elementary school through the early 1970s. Later in the 1970s the building was converted into apartments.

The city transferred the building to Sojourner-Douglass College in 2003 after the institution paid $150,000. The college, which also operated in several other former buildings of the Baltimore City Public Schools, ceased operation in 2015. In August 2016 the City of Baltimore listed the building on a foreclosure auction and sold it in 2017. It was to be developed into an entertainment and arts center, but the building remains vacant as of 2019.

Eastern Female High School was listed on the National Register of Historic Places in 1971.
