= Jane Gilmor Howard =

American author and socialite

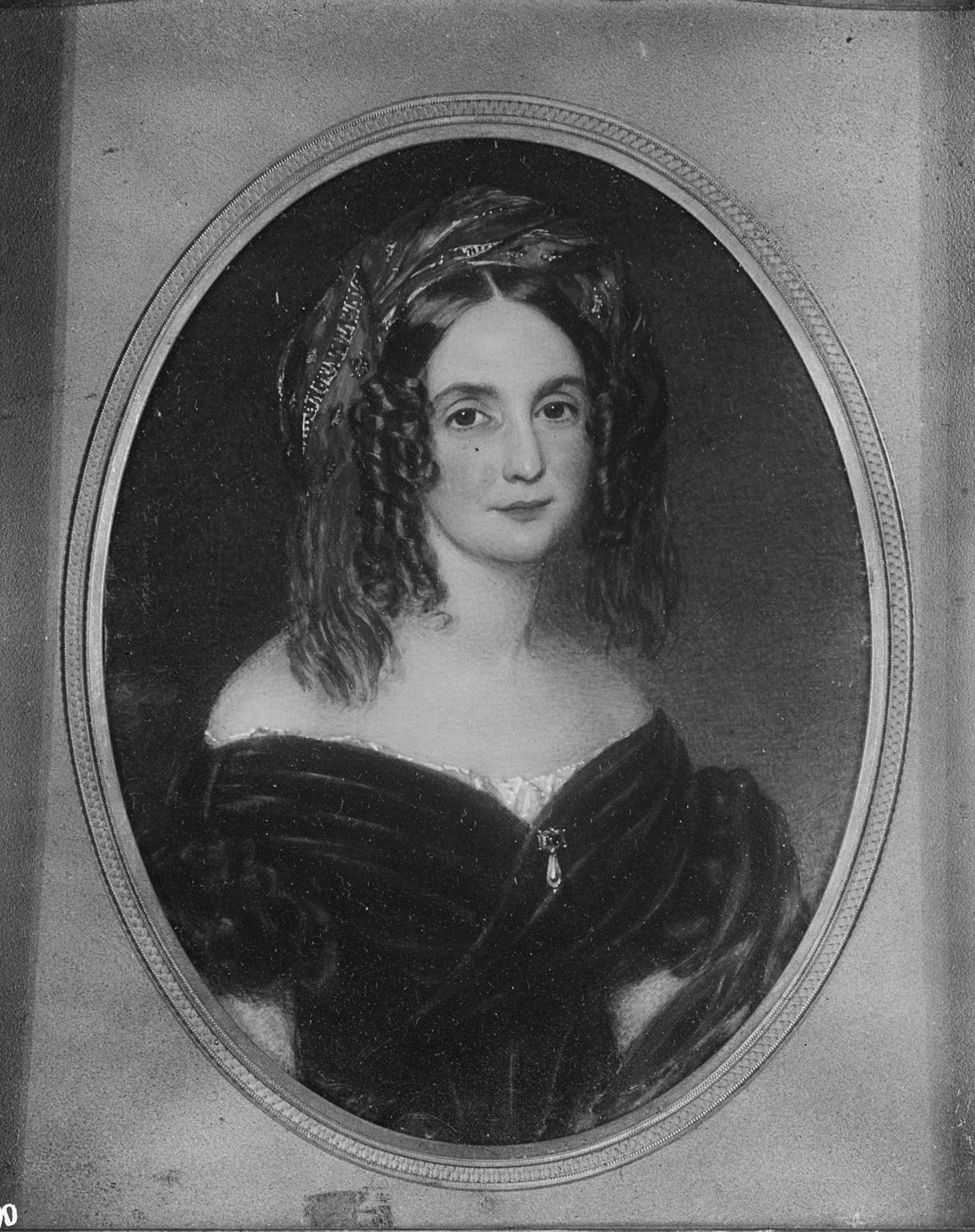
- Born: Jane Gilmor; March 29, 1801; Baltimore, Maryland
- Died: November 29, 1890 (aged 89); Baltimore, Maryland
- Resting place: Green Mount Cemetery
- Known for: Fifty Years in a Maryland Kitchen (1873)
- Spouse: Benjamin Chew Howard

Jane Gilmor Howard (March 29, 1801— November 29, 1890) was an American author from Baltimore best known for her work Fifty Years in a Maryland Kitchen. She was the wife of the politician Benjamin Chew Howard.

== Early life ==
Jane Gilmor was born to parents William and Mary Gilmor on March 29, 1801 in Baltimore, Maryland.

== Charitable work ==
Howard was active member of the Great Southern Relief Association, becoming its president in 1865. As president, Howard raised $200,000 (equivalent to about $5.3 million today) to aid recovery for poor Southerners after the American Civil War.

=== Fifty Years in a Maryland Kitchen ===
One of Howard's most successful charitable endeavors was her cookbook, Fifty Years in a Maryland Kitchen, which she wrote to raise money for charity in 1873. Howard used the author name Mrs. B. C. Howard for the book. Howard wrote that she personally tested all the recipes in her own home, and that none were too complicated for a new cook to learn. Her recipes focused on instruction for how to prepare the dishes, rather than specific ingredient amounts, as was common at the time for cookbooks.

Fifty Years in a Maryland Kitchen featured recipes from both her native Maryland and Southern cuisine, as well as dishes from European kitchens: including, but not limited to, gumbo filet [sic] soup, okra soup, General Lee's Jelly Cake, and French carrot soup. Howard included a glossary of French-language cooking terms in the back of the cookbook to introduce her readership to potentially unfamiliar terms. As a result, Howard's accessible cookbook remained a staple in middle-class homes throughout 19th-century Maryland.

Fifty Years in a Maryland Kitchen was revised in 1882 and (after Howard's death) again in 1913 and 1944 by Florence Brobeck. The differences between revisions was significant. Howard's 1882 edition featured new recipes for meats like crab, turkey, duck, goose, and beef. According to a study in Environmental History, the 1882 edition featured 30% oyster-based recipes, but by the 1944 edition, only 15% of the recipes featured oysters.

The cookbook has been praised by modern-day historians for offering a detailed account of 19th century cooking in historic Maryland. Howard's recipes have been reproduced in numerous cookbooks, including The Carolina Rice Kitchen: The African Connection by Martha Hess and The Art of Eating Cookbook by Edward Behr.

== Personal life ==
Jane married American politician Benjamin Chew Howard at the age of 17. Together, the couple had either 12 or 16 children, but only eight survived until adulthood. All six of their sons served the Confederacy in the American Civil War.

Their children are listed as follows:

- Robert Gilmor (died 1821)
- Louisa Howard Hoffman (1819-1876)
- Sophia Howard (1822-1852)
- Ellen Howard Bayard (1833-1911)
- Marian Gilmor Howard (b.1825)
- Ann Williams Howard (b.1826)
- Jane Gilmor Howard King (b.1827)
- Juliana Howard Tyson (1830-1909)
- William Gilmor Howard (1835-1877)

Howard died on November 29, 1890, at the age of 89, in her hometown of Baltimore. Her death was written about in The Baltimore Sun; according to the obituary, she died at 6:00 am in her home. She is buried at Green Mount Cemetery in Baltimore.
