= Jennings House (Annapolis, Maryland) =

Residence of Maryland colonial and State governors, from 1753 to 1869

Coordinates: 38°58′51.94″N 76°29′9.32″W

Jennings House, located in Annapolis, Maryland, was the residence of the governors of Maryland from 1777 until 1870, when it was replaced by Government House. The building was sold to the United States Naval Academy in 1869 for $25,000 (equivalent to $605,000 in 2025). It was demolished in 1901.

Governor George Howard, son of Governor John Eager Howard, was born in Jennings House in 1789.
