= George Howard (governor of Maryland) =

American politician (1789-1846)

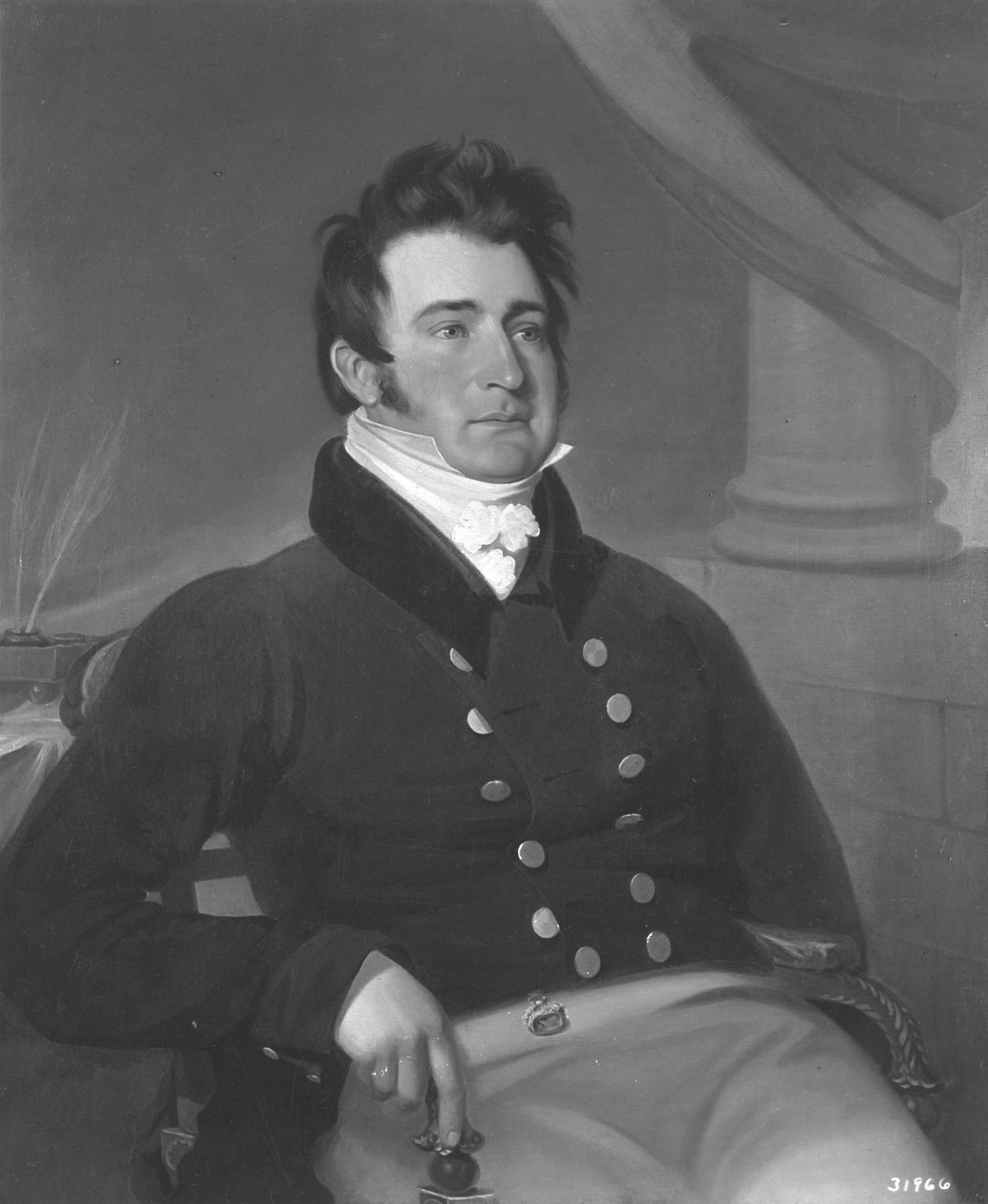
- Portrait attributed to Thomas Sully, c. 1825-30

22nd Governor of Maryland
- In office July 11, 1831 – January 17, 1833
- Preceded by: Daniel Martin
- Succeeded by: James Thomas

Personal details
- Born: November 21, 1789 Annapolis, Maryland, U.S.
- Died: August 2, 1846 (aged 56) Howard County, Maryland, U.S.
- Relatives: John Eager Howard (father); Peggy Chew Howard (mother)

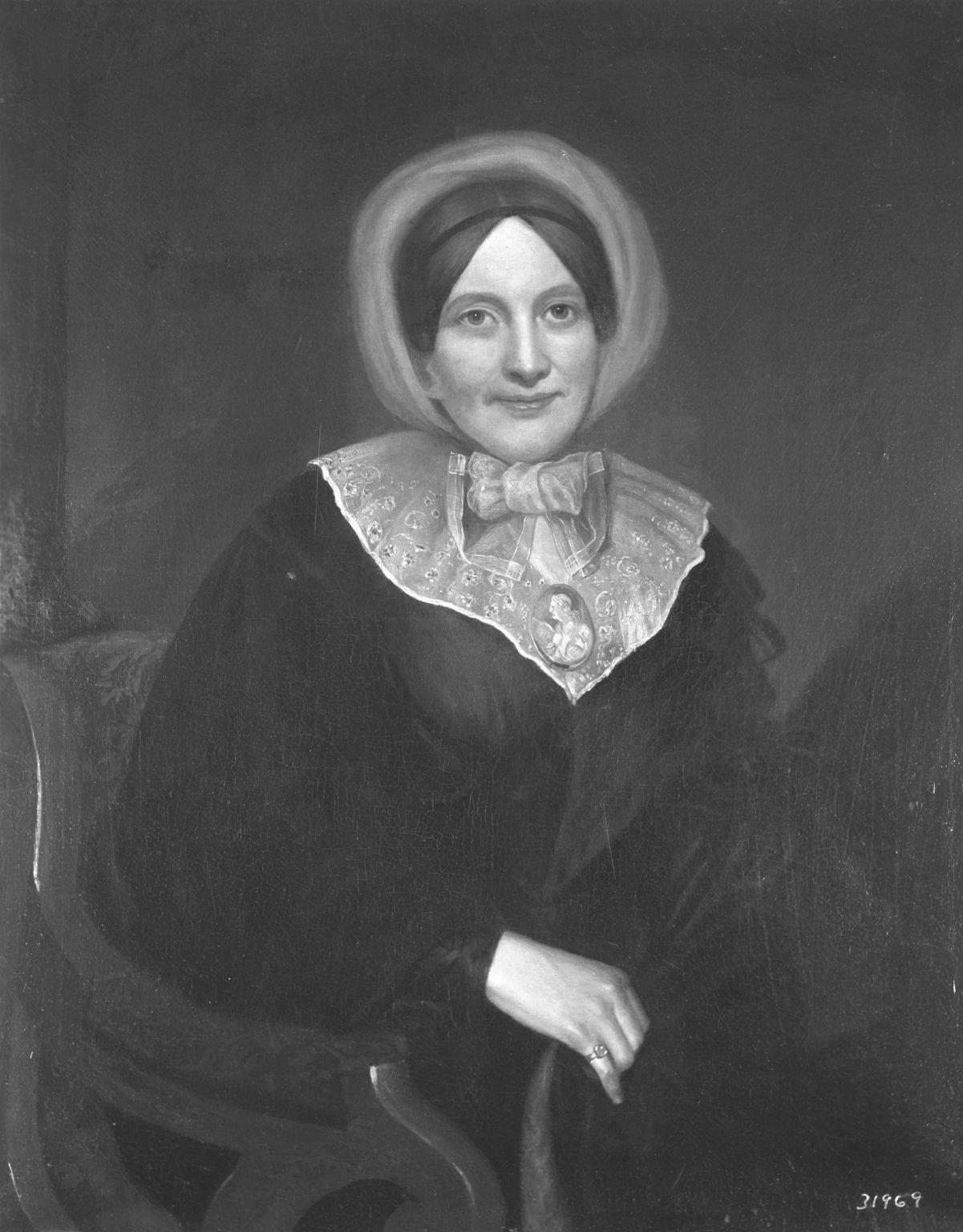
Prudence Gough Ridgely

George Howard (November 21, 1789 – August 2, 1846) was the 22nd governor of the state of Maryland in the United States from 1831 to 1833. Howard was well known as a fervent anti-Jacksonian during his term in office.

== Biography ==
He was born on November 21, 1789, in the Governor's Mansion in Annapolis, the second son of Gov. John Eager Howard (1752–1827) and Margaret Oswald "Peggy" Chew. The family later lived at "Belvidere" in Baltimore County, Maryland, where he was educated by tutors. On December 26, 1811, he married Prudence Gough Ridgely, a daughter of Gov. Charles Carnan Ridgely (1760–1829) of Hampton and Priscilla Dorsey (1762–1814). Priscilla descended from the Dorsey family of Maryland; one of the original families of Maryland and founders of Anne Arundel County, Maryland. They received "Waverly" near Woodstock, Maryland, as a wedding gift from his father. They had fourteen children (nine boys and five girls).

At "Waverly," he led the life of a country gentleman and farmer. He was elected a member of the Governor's Council in January 1831 and worked closely with his predecessor Daniel Martin. When Gov. Martin died in July 1831, Howard, as President of the Council, succeeded him, taking the oath of office on July 22 of that year. When Martin's unexpired term ended in January 1832, the Maryland General Assembly elected Howard for a full-year term, receiving 64 of the 82 ballots cast.

Howard advocated the establishment of a State Bank, opposed the doctrine of nullification, was a foe of lotteries, and urged the endowment of Maryland colleges. Alexis de Tocqueville, the author of Democracy in America, described Howard in 1831 in his journal following several meetings as "... the son of the famous Colonel Howard and the representative of one of the oldest families. All of these gentlemen [referring to Howard and a couple other sons of famous Revolutionary War figures] are very ordinary individuals and evidently owe their elevation simply to their names."

Howard held many slaves, but he was receptive to the movement to colonize free Negroes in Africa, telling the legislature "The prosecution of this system may probably at some distant day, tend to the restoration of the whole of our colored population, to the land of their forefathers." In June 1842, Howard created and served as chair to the Maryland Slave-Holders Convention with Charles Carroll, Allen Thomas, CD Warfield, Upton Welsh, Benjamin Howard, Wesley Linthicum, and William H Worthington as representatives from the Howard district of Anne Arundel County (Now Howard County).

Howard retired to "Waverly" following the end of his term. He served as a presidential elector in 1836 and 1840, when he supported the Whig candidate. He died at his home on August 2, 1846, and was probably buried first in the family burial ground at "Waverly." His remains were later removed to the Western Cemetery. His body was again removed, but its present resting place is unknown. He is believed to be buried in the Howard family vault at Old Saint Paul's Cemetery in Baltimore, Maryland, where his father John Eager Howard is also buried. Howard left "Waverly" to his wife, Prudence, along with 22 slaves. She died the following year and willed the estate to the couple's oldest son, George, Jr.

George Howard was painted by C. Gregory Stapko. His wife, Prudence Dorsey, was painted by Philip Tilyard. Her portrait can be found in the collection of Hampton National Historic Site HAMP 5662.

Political offices
Preceded by Daniel Martin	Governor of Maryland; 1831–1833	Succeeded by James Thomas
