= William Howard (engineer) =

American mechanical engineer (1793–1834)

- Born: 1793; Baltimore, Maryland, U.S.
- Died: 1834 (aged 40–41)
- Education: University of Maryland
- Occupations: Physician; topographical engineer; architect
- Employer: United States Army Corps of Topographical Engineers
- Spouse: Rebecca Ann Key (m. 1828)
- Children: 1
- Parent(s): John Eager Howard (father); Peggy Chew Howard (mother)

William Howard (1793–1834) was an American topographical engineer who was one of the first to work for the Baltimore and Ohio Railroad. When the railroad built its first cars using friction bearings first developed by Ross Winans, Howard made his own design and patented it on November 2, 1828.

== Early life ==
William Howard was born at the Belvedere mansion in Baltimore, Maryland in 1793 to Peggy (née Chew) and John Eager Howard. He received his degree in medicine from the University of Maryland School of Medicine in 1817.

After graduating, in 1819, Howard traveled with his friend Jeremias "Jeremiah" Van Rensselaer, the son of the Lieutenant Governor of New York Jeremiah Van Rensselaer, to Italy and hiked Mount Etna and Vesuvius. On July 12, 1819, Howard and his friend became the first Americans to ascend Mount Blanc. In April 1821, Howard published his account in a book called A Narrative of a Journey to the Summit of Mont Blanc, made in July, 1819.

== Career ==
=== Medical career ===
In 1820, Howard took up the practice of medicine, but, according to family legend, quit after losing his first patient. He worked under J.B. Davidge as an adjunct professor of anatomy at the University of Maryland from 1820 to 1821. He then resigned to become a government engineer.

=== Engineering career ===
Following the General Survey Act of 1824, Howard was employed as a topographical engineer by the government prior to the forming of the United States Army Corps of Topographical Engineers. In 1827, Howard worked on an early survey for the Chesapeake and Ohio Canal. He confirmed previous surveys that a route through Montgomery County wasn't possible, and instead proposed a northeastern route along the Potomac, Anacostia, and Patuxent rivers. The location and expense of the route was distasteful to Maryland, so the project was dropped. When the new Maryland Canal Company formed, they followed part of his plan: to have the canal go through the District of Columbia.

In May 1827, the Board of Engineers for Internal Improvement assign Howard to head a surveying brigade for the Baltimore and Ohio Railroad. In 1827, Howard also worked on a survey that was the precursor for the Elmira and Williamsport Railroad. In 1829, he was sent to Chicago by Colonel John James Abert to survey a route connecting Lake Michigan to the Illinois River and to improve the Chicago Harbor.

By 1832, Howard worked as an assistant to General Simon Bernard and Joseph Gilbert Totten. In 1833, he finished a survey of the Monongahela River below Brownsville, Pennsylvania that Congressman Andrew Stewart used to try to procure federal funding.

In the summer of 1834, Howard was assigned by Abert along with two other assistants the task of surveying areas of the Chesapeake Bay and the Susquehanna River. This would be one of his last projects as the project was abandoned likely due in part to his death.

==== Invention ====
In 1829, the Franklin Institute of Philadelphia published his Specification for an Improvement in Locomotive Engines.

== Other endeavors ==
Howard collaborated with Baltimore architect William F. Small and had influence on the construction of Carrollton Hall. He also designed McKim's School with Small and Barnum's Hotel in Baltimore.

Howard served as the corresponding secretary for the Maryland Institute for the Promotion of the Arts (later named the Maryland Institute College of Art).

== Personal life ==
Howard married Rebecca Ann Key (1809-1880) in 1828. She was the daughter of Anne (née Plater) and Philip Barton Key. Together, they had one son, William Key.

Howard had an extensive private library covering all branches of science and literature.

== Death ==
Howard died in 1834.
