= John Eager Howard =

American politician (1752–1827)

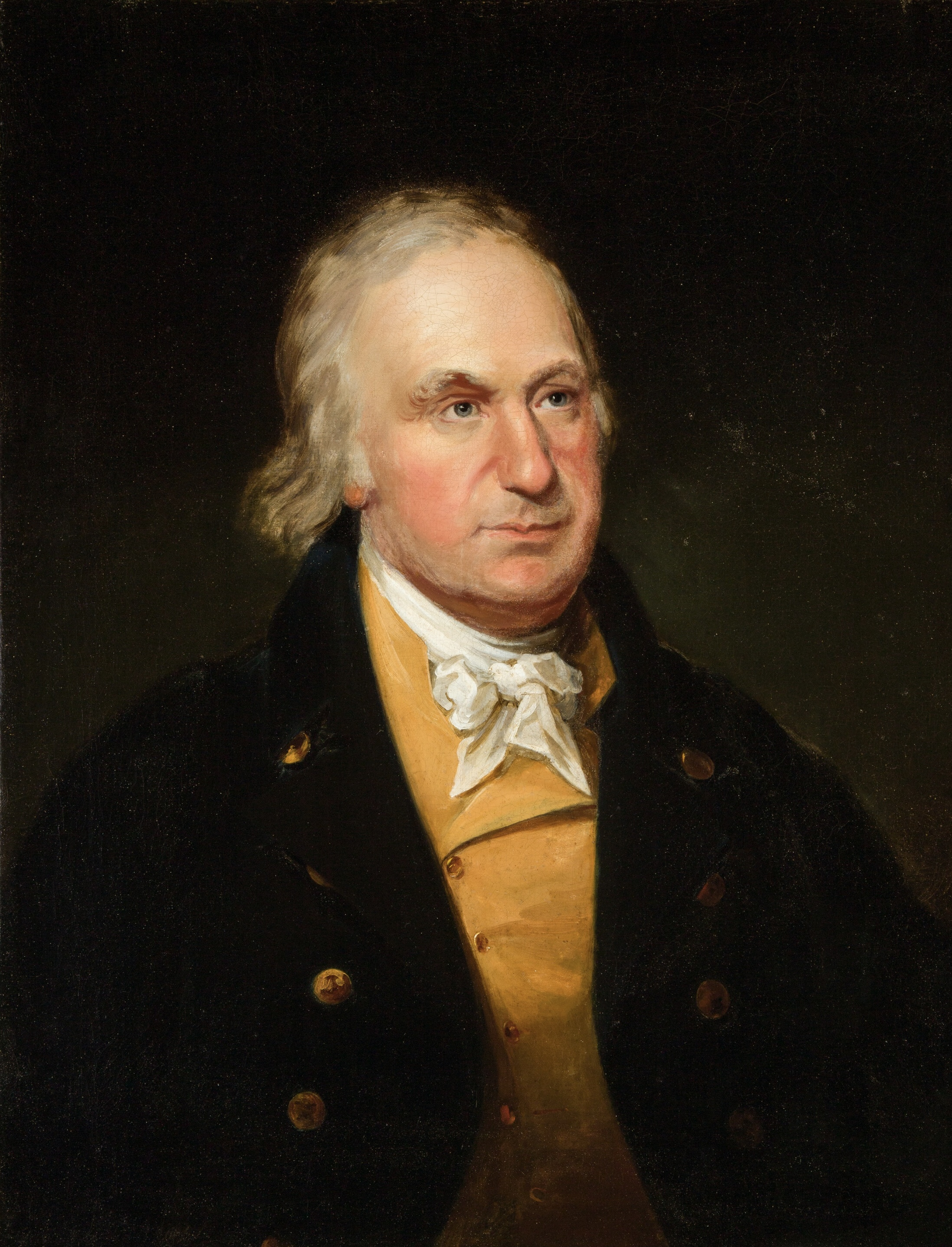
- Portrait by Rembrandt Peale, c. 1825

President pro tempore of the United States Senate
- In office November 21, 1800 – November 27, 1800
- Preceded by: Uriah Tracy
- Succeeded by: James Hillhouse

United States Senator from Maryland
- In office November 21, 1796 – March 3, 1803
- Preceded by: Richard Potts
- Succeeded by: Samuel Smith

5th Governor of Maryland
- In office November 24, 1788 – November 14, 1791
- Preceded by: William Smallwood
- Succeeded by: George Plater

Member of the Maryland Senate
- In office 1791–1795

Personal details
- Born: John Eager Howard; June 4, 1752 Baltimore County, Maryland, British America
- Died: October 12, 1827 (aged 75) Baltimore County, Maryland, U.S.
- Resting place: Old Saint Paul's Cemetery
- Party: Federalist
- Spouse: Peggy Chew (m. 1787; died 1824)
- Children: 9, including George, Benjamin, and William
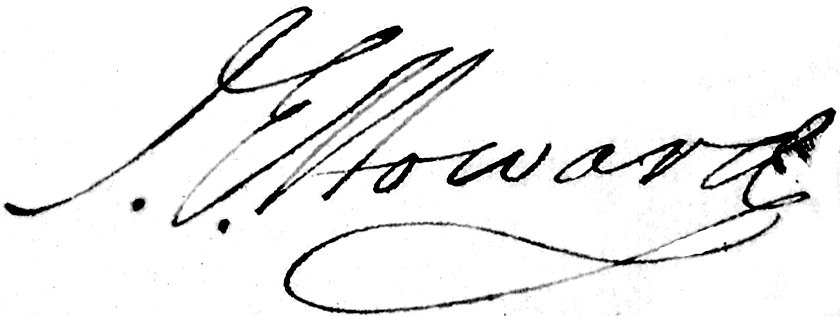
- Signature

John Eager Howard (June 4, 1752 – October 12, 1827) was an American soldier and politician from Maryland. He was elected as governor of the state in 1788, and served three one-year terms. He also was elected to the Continental Congress, the Congress of the Confederation, the United States Senate, and the Maryland Senate. In the 1816 presidential election, Howard received 22 electoral votes for vice president on the Federalist Party ticket with Rufus King; the ticket lost to Democratic-Republicans James Monroe and Daniel D. Tompkins in a landslide.

Howard County, Maryland, is named for him, as are three streets in Baltimore. For seven days in November 1800, Howard was president pro tempore of the Senate.

== Early life and education ==
Coat of Arms of John Eager Howard

John Eager Howard was the son of Cornelius Howard and Ruth (Eager) Howard, of the Maryland planter elite and was born at their plantation "The Forest" in Baltimore County, Maryland. Howard grew up in an Anglican slaveholding family.

Howard joined a Baltimore lodge of Freemasons.

== Military career ==
Commissioned a captain at the beginning of the American Revolutionary War (1775–1783), Howard rose in 1777 to the rank of colonel in the Maryland Line of the Continental Army, fighting in the Battle of White Plains in 1776 and in the Battle of Monmouth in 1778. He was awarded a silver medal by the Confederation Congress for his leadership at the Battle of Cowpens in 1781, during which he commanded the 2nd Maryland Regiment. In September 1781, he was wounded in a bayonet charge at the Battle of Eutaw Springs. Major General Nathanael Greene wrote that Howard was "as good an officer as the world affords. He has great ability and the best disposition to promote the service....He deserves a statue of gold."

At the conclusion of the war, Colonel Howard was admitted as an original member of the Society of the Cincinnati of Maryland. He went on to serve as the vice president (1795–1804) and president (1804–1827) of the Society in Maryland.

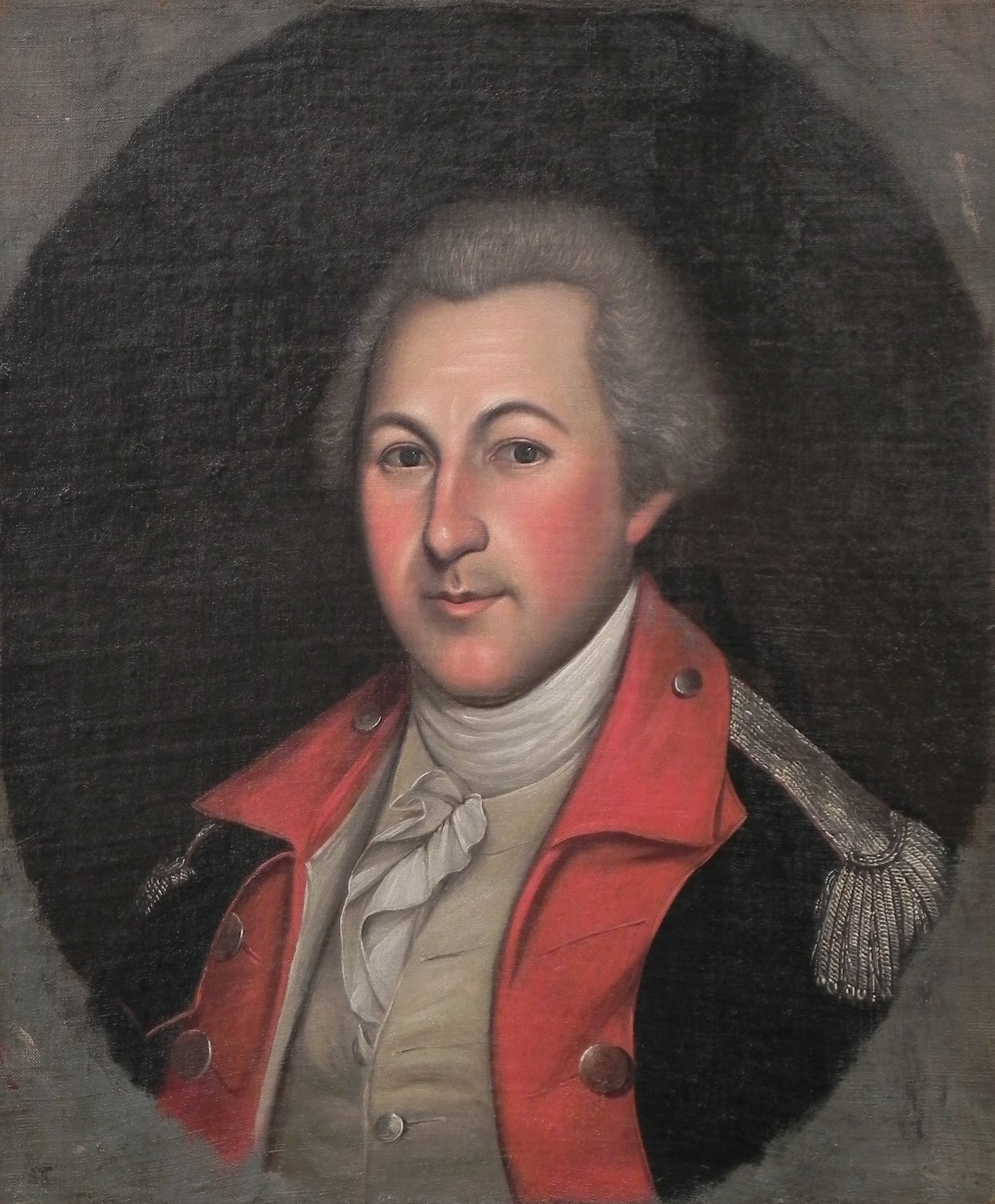
Colonel John Eager Howard in Uniform, painted in 1784 by Charles Willson Peale

== Political life ==
Following his army service, Howard held several electoral political positions: elected to the Confederation Congress in 1788; fifth Governor of Maryland for three one-year terms from 1788 through 1791; later as State Senator from 1791 through 1795; and elector in the presidential election of 1792. He declined an offer from George Washington in 1795 to serve as Secretary of War. He subsequently joined the newly organized Federalist Party and was elected to the Senate of the Fourth Congress by the General Assembly of Maryland to serve the remainder of the term of Richard Potts, who had resigned. He was elected to a Senate term of his own in 1797, serving until March 3, 1803, and briefly served as president pro tempore of the Senate in November 1800. While in Congress, he was the sole Federalist to vote against the Sedition Act.

In 1798, amidst rising tensions with France, Howard declined a commission as brigadier general in the United States Army.

At the end of his Senate term in 1803, Howard returned to Baltimore, where he avoided elected office but continued in public service and philanthropy. He was elected a member of the American Antiquarian Society in 1815. In the 1816 presidential election, he received 22 electoral votes for Vice President as the running mate of Federalist Rufus King, losing to Democratic-Republican candidates James Monroe and Daniel D. Tompkins in a landslide. No formal Federalist nomination had been made, and it is not clear whether Howard himself, who was one of several Federalists who received electoral votes for vice president, actually wanted to run.

Howard developed property in the city of Baltimore and was active in city planning. His house was constructed north of the city, in what later became the Mount Vernon neighborhood, where he owned slaves.

== Marriage and family ==
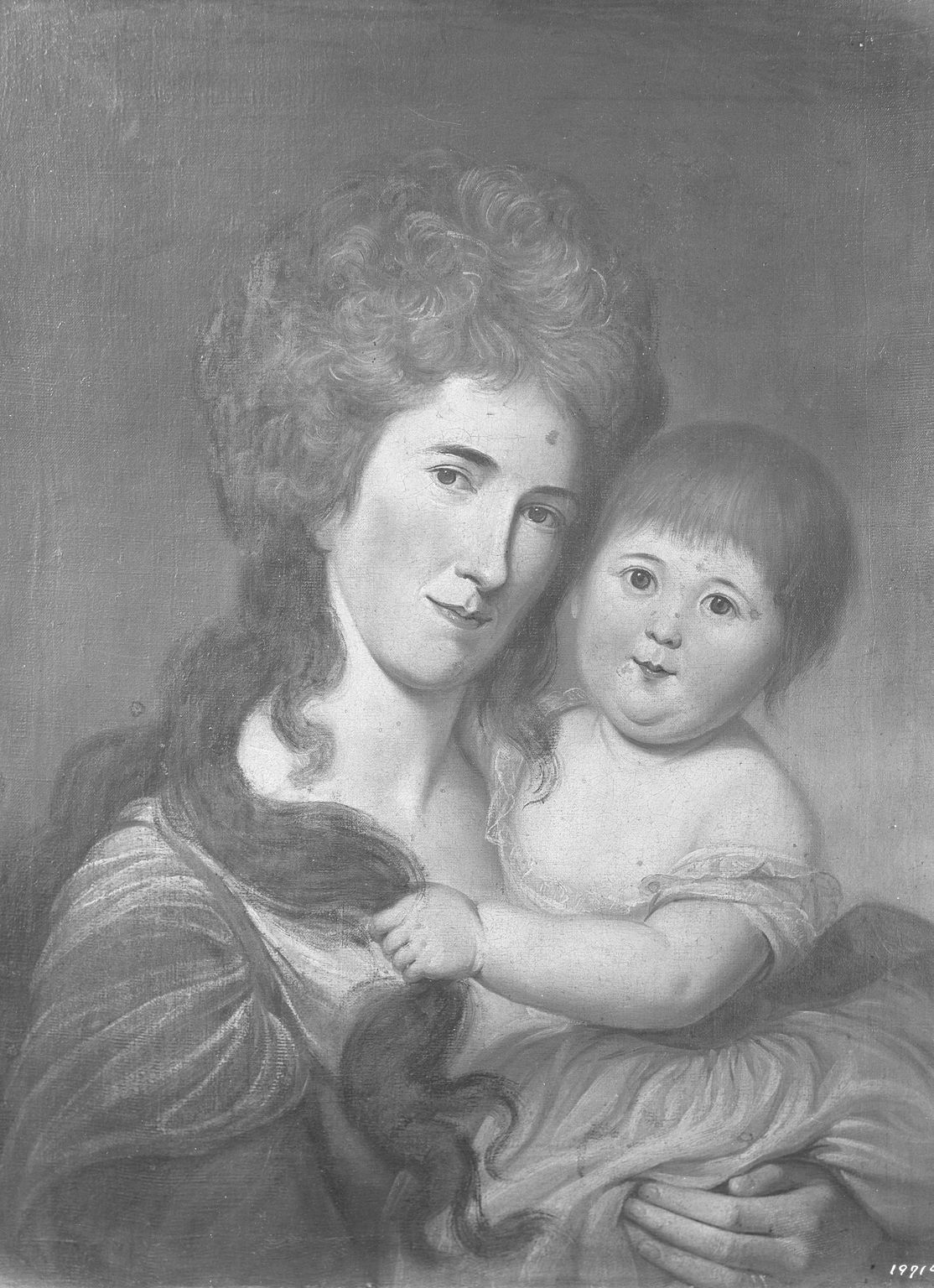
Peggy Chew Howard and John Eager Howard Jr., portrait by Charles Willson Peale

Howard married Margaret ("Peggy") Chew, daughter of Pennsylvania Supreme Court justice Benjamin Chew, in 1787. They had nine children:

- John Eager Howard Jr. (1788–1822), Maryland State Senator.
- George Howard, Governor of Maryland.
- Benjamin Chew Howard (1791–1872), US Representative and Reporter of Decisions of the Supreme Court of the United States.
- Dr. William Howard (1793–1834), civil engineer for the War Department.
- Juliana Howard McHenry (1796–1821)
- James Howard (1797–1870)
- Sophia Howard Read (1800–1880)
- Charles Howard (1802–1869), father of Frank Key Howard.
- Mary (February–May 1806)

== Death and legacy ==
Howard died in 1827. He is buried at Old Saint Paul's Cemetery in Baltimore.

- Howard County, Maryland, was named for Howard.
- In 1904, the city of Baltimore commissioned an equestrian statue of Howard by Emmanuel Frémiet and installed it at Washington Place in Mount Vernon.
- The former Maryland state song "Maryland, My Maryland" refers to "Howard's war-like thrust".
- Three streets in Baltimore are named for Howard: John Street, Eager Street, and Howard Street.
- Howard appears in John Trumbull's 1824 painting General George Washington Resigning His Commission, which was featured on the reverse of the United States five-thousand-dollar bill.

Political offices
Preceded by William Smallwood	Governor of Maryland; 1788–1791	Succeeded by George Plater
Preceded by Uriah Tracy	President pro tempore of the United States Senate; 1800	Succeeded by James Hillhouse
U.S. Senate
Preceded by Richard Potts	U.S. Senator (Class 1) from Maryland; 1796–1803; Served alongside: John Henry, James Lloyd, William Hindman, Robert Wright	Succeeded by Samuel Smith
Party political offices
Preceded by Jared Ingersoll	Federalist nominee for Vice President of the United States; 1816	Succeeded by Richard Stockton
