= Samuel Hambleton (politician) =

American politician (1812–1886)

Member of the U.S. House of Representatives from Maryland's 1st district
- In office March 4, 1869 – March 3, 1873
- Preceded by: Hiram McCullough
- Succeeded by: Ephraim King Wilson II

Member of the Maryland House of Delegates from the Talbot County district
- In office 1854–1854 Serving with Richard Harrington
- Preceded by: O. P. Sparks and William B. Willis
- Succeeded by: William B. Clark and William D. Roberts

Member of the Maryland Senate from the Talbot County district
- In office 1844–1844
- Preceded by: Nicholas Martin
- Succeeded by: Edward Lloyd

Member of the Maryland House of Delegates from the Talbot County district
- In office 1834–1835 Serving with Joseph Bruff, George Dudley, Solomon Mulliken
- Preceded by: Joseph Bruff, George Dudley, Philip Horney, Richard Spencer
- Succeeded by: John Boyle, John Bozman Kerr, Thomas O. Martin, William Townsend

Personal details
- Born: January 8, 1812 near Easton, Maryland, U.S.
- Died: December 9, 1886 (aged 74) Easton, Maryland, U.S.
- Resting place: Spring Hill Cemetery
- Party: Whig (before 1856); Democratic (after 1856)
- Spouse: Elizabeth Parrott
- Children: 2
- Parent: Edward N. Hambleton (father)
- Occupation: Politician; lawyer

Samuel Hambleton (January 8, 1812 – December 9, 1886) was an American politician from Maryland. He served as a member of the Maryland House of Delegates, representing Talbot County from 1834 to 1835 and in 1854. He also served in the Maryland Senate in 1844. He served as a U.S. representative from Maryland from 1869 to 1873.

== Early life ==
Samuel Hambleton was born on January 8, 1812, at "Waterloo" farm near Easton, Talbot County, Maryland, to Mary (née Sherwood) and Edward N. Hambleton. His father was a member of the Maryland House of Delegates. Hambleton was educated by private tutors and attended Easton Academy. He studied law under Theodore R. Loockerman. He was admitted to the bar in 1833, and commenced practice in Easton, Maryland.

== Career ==
Hambleton was a Whig. In 1833, he was nominated to serve as a member of the Maryland House of Delegates, but lost. He then served as a member of the Maryland House of Delegates, representing Talbot County from 1834 to 1836. He was appointed deputy state's attorney for Talbot County from 1836. He served in that role until 1844. In 1844, he was a presidential elector for the Whig Party.

Hambleton was elected to the Maryland Senate in 1844, defeating Democratic nominee Nicholas Martin. He served until 1850. He was president of the Chesapeake & Ohio Canal in 1853 and 1854, and again served as a member of the House of Delegates in 1854. Around 1856, he left the Whig Party and joined the Democratic Party. He was elected as a Democrat to the Forty-first and Forty-second Congresses, in 1868, defeating Henry R. Torbert. He served from March 4, 1869, to March 3, 1873.

In 1845, Governor Thomas Pratt appointed Hambleton as colonel of cavalry. He organized five companies in his regiment and commanded the regiment for four years. He served as a director of the Farmer's Bank of Maryland for the Eastern Shore and later a director and attorney for the Easton National Bank. He was a member of the board of trustees of the Maryland Agricultural Society for the Eastern Shore. He was a director of the Maryland & Delaware Railroad (later the Chesapeake & Delaware Railroad). He was president of the board of trustees of Easton Academy when it was merged into Easton High School.

== Personal life ==
Hambleton married Elizabeth Parrott, his cousin and daughter of James Parrott. They had at least one son and daughter, including Alexander. His son served in the Confederate Army. Hambleton's contemporaries referred to him as Colonel Hambleton. He also went by Samuel Hambleton Jr. since his uncle had the same name. He was a member of the Protestant Episcopal Church.

Hambleton died at his home in Easton on December 9, 1886. He is interred in Spring Hill Cemetery.

U.S. House of Representatives
Preceded by Hiram McCullough	Member of the U.S. House of Representatives from Maryland's 1st congressional district March 4, 1869 – March 3, 1873	Succeeded by Ephraim King Wilson II
