= Oswald Tilghman =

American politician

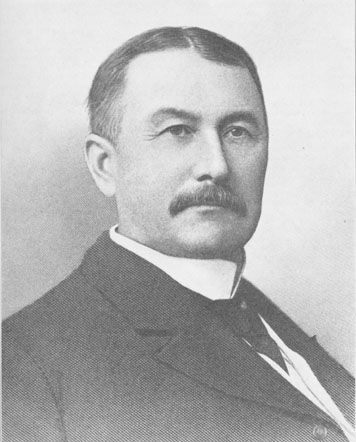

Secretary of State of Maryland
- In office 1904–1908
- Governor: Edwin Warfield
- Preceded by: Wilfred Bateman
- Succeeded by: N. Winslow Williams

Member of Maryland State Senate
- In office 1894–1896

Personal details
- Born: March 7, 1841 near Oxford, Maryland, U.S.
- Died: June 17, 1932 (aged 91) Easton, Maryland, U.S.
- Resting place: Spring Hill Cemetery; Easton, Maryland, U.S.
- Relatives: John Leeds Kerr (grandfather); John Bozman Kerr (uncle); Lloyd Tilghman (cousin)
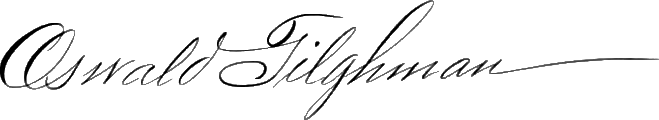
- Signature
- Military career
- Allegiance: Confederate States of America
- Service years: 1861–1865
- Rank: Colonel
- Units: Terry's Texas Rangers, Company B
- Conflicts: American Civil War; Battle of Shiloh; Siege of Port Hudson (POW)

Oswald Tilghman (March 7, 1841 – June 17, 1932) was an officer of the Confederate States Army during the American Civil War; a lawyer; Maryland politician; Maryland Senator, Talbot County, (1894–96); Secretary of State of Maryland (1904–08); affiliate of the Maryland Democratic Party; author; and was active in veteran affairs. Native of Talbot County, Maryland.

== Early life and ancestry ==
Col. Oswald Tilghman, Esq. was born on March 7, 1841, on a colonial Talbot County plantation known as Plimhimmon, near Oxford, Maryland, on March 7, 1841. His father, General Tench Tilghman (a graduate of West Point military academy), and his mother was a daughter of John Leeds Kerr, United States Senator of Maryland from 1841 to 1843. Matthew Tilghman, an ancestor, was a member of the Continental Congress at the time of the Declaration of Independence, and Colonel Tench Tilghman, another ancestor, served as aide-de-camp to General George Washington in the Continental Army.

Oswald Tilghman was educated at the Maryland Military Academy in Oxford, Maryland. After his education, he moved to Texas in 1859 and settled in Washington County.

As a descendant of Colonel Tench Tilghman, Oswald was admitted as a hereditary member of The Society of the Cincinnati in the state of Maryland in 1882. He later served as president of the Maryland Society from 1907 to 1931.

== U.S. Civil War ==
When the American Civil War began in 1861, he volunteered as a private in Company B, in Terry's Texas Rangers, of the Confederate States of America army. On April 6–7, 1862, he participated in the Battle of Shiloh in Tennessee and in the campaigns about Richmond, Virginia. He became a Lieutenant and served as an aide on the staff of his cousin, General Lloyd Tilghman (who was killed in front at the Battle of Champion Hill). On March 14, 1863, Oswald took active part, with his battery, in that led to the destruction of the United States steam frigate USS Mississippi (1841), of which Admiral George Dewey was then executive officer, when Admiral Farragut's fleet attempted to pass the Confederate batteries. For his bravery on this occasion, he was commended by Lieutenant Colonel de Gournay, who commanded the left wing of the Confederate batteries. During the Siege of Port Hudson in Louisiana, Lieutenant Oswald Tilghman commanded the Rock City artillery of Nashville, Tennessee, a heavy battery on the banks of the Mississippi River and was the only one of the four officers of that battery who survived the siege. Lieut. Oswald Tilghman was taken captive during May 22 – July 9, 1863, at the Siege of Port Hudson, then was held prisoner at Johnson's Island in Sandusky, Ohio, for 23 months until the conclusion of the war.

== Later life ==
=== Return to Talbot County ===
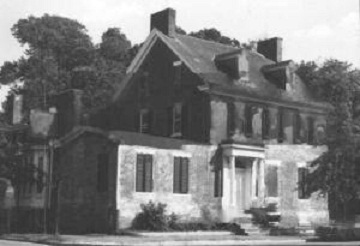
Foxley Hall. Former home of Oswald Tilghman

When the conflict between North and South had been brought to a close in 1865, Tilghman returned to native area of Talbot County, Maryland, and began his preparation for the legal profession. He read law with Maryland Senator, Charles H. Gibson, was admitted to the bar in 1875, and engaged in the practice of law and in the real estate business. He resided at Foxley Hall, in Easton, Maryland, a colonial brick mansion built in 1801 by Henry Dickinson, whose son, Charles Dickinson, was killed by General Andrew Jackson in a duel in Logan County, Kentucky., in 1806. In 1882 he became a member of the Maryland Society of the Cincinnati.

=== Family ===
He was married in 1884 to Belle Harrison, daughter of Dr. Samuel A. Harrison, the local annalist of Talbot County. They had two children, Mary Foxley Tilghman (1886–1976) married John Frazer, PhD., and a son, Samuel Harrison Tilghman, a graduate in civil engineering of Lehigh University, class of 1907.

=== Post-Civil War activity ===
Maryland Governor William Thomas Hamilton, appointed Oswald Tilghman, in 1881, as one of the two commissioners, with the rank of colonel, to represent the state at the Centennial Celebration of Cornwallis's surrender at Yorktown. On this occasion he wore the sword presented to Colonel Tench Tilghman by congress in 1781 for his especial service in bearing to the Continental Congress in Philadelphia, Pennsylvania, the official announcement from General George Washington of the surrender of the British garrison at Yorktown. Colonel Tilghman owned a valuable collection of Revolutionary relics and papers and was affiliated with many patriotic and fraternal societies such as:

- Member of the Maryland Historical Society
- Vice-president of the Society of the Cincinnati of Maryland (It is the oldest hereditary society in North America)
- Represented the Maryland State Society in the General Society of the Cincinnati
- Member of the Maryland Society of Colonial Wars
- Commander of Charles S. Winder Camp, United Confederate Veterans
- Brigadier General of the 1st Brigade, 2nd Maryland Division of the United Confederate Veterans
- Member of the Freemasonry
- Member of the Odd Fellows
- President of the Board of Development of the Eastern Shore of Maryland
- Auditor of the Circuit Court of Talbot County for over twenty years

=== Political activity ===
Elected on the Democratic ballot, Senator Oswald Tilghman represented Talbot County in the Maryland Senate, 1894–96.

- Member of the Maryland Democratic Party
- Chairman, Committee on Public Buildings in Annapolis, Maryland
- Member of Committee on Judicial Proceedings
- Member of Committee on Pensions
- Member of Committee on Chesapeake Bay and Tributaries
- Member of Amendments to the Maryland Constitution of 1867
- President of the Board of Development of the Eastern Shore of Maryland
- Auditor of the Circuit Court of Talbot County, 1886–1906
- Commissioner to represent Maryland at the Pan-American Exposition in Buffalo, New York, in 1901
- Commissioner to represent Maryland at the exposition at Charleston, South Carolina, in 1902
- The State Bureau of Immigration in 1896 was established largely through his efforts

From 1904 to 1908 he was appointed, Maryland's Secretary of State by Governor Edwin Warfield. who was a long personal friend.

== Publishing activity ==
He was the author of several historical topics, genealogical papers, and addresses.

=== Publications ===
- History of Annapolis
- History of Talbot County, Maryland 1661-1861
- Memoir of Lieut.Col.Tench Tilghman

== Death ==
Oswald Tilghman died June 17, 1932, at his home in Easton. He is buried at Spring Hill Cemetery in Easton.

Political offices
Preceded by Wilfred Bateman	Secretary of State of Maryland; 1904–1908	Succeeded by N. Winslow Williams
