= Isaac A. Barber =

American politician (1852–1909)

Isaac Ambrose Barber
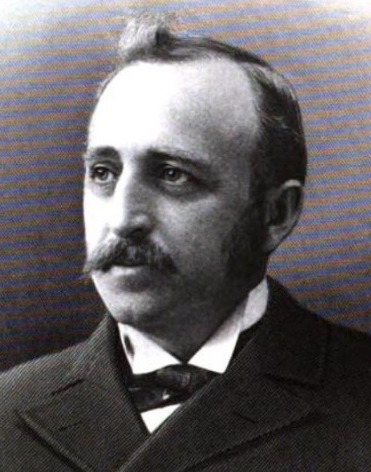
- From Volume III of 1911's Men of Mark in Maryland

Member of the U.S. House of Representatives from Maryland's 1st district
- In office March 4, 1897 – March 3, 1899
- Preceded by: Joshua Weldon Miles
- Succeeded by: John Walter Smith

Chair of the Maryland Republican Party
- In office 1900–1904

Personal details
- Born: January 26, 1852 Salem, New Jersey, U.S.
- Died: March 1, 1909 (aged 57) Easton, Maryland, U.S.
- Resting place: Spring Hill Cemetery
- Party: Republican
- Spouse: Nellie V. Collison (m. 1878)
- Children: 4
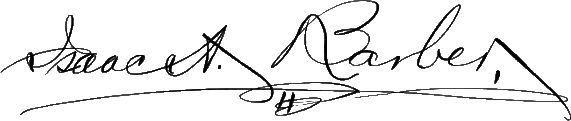
- Signature

Isaac Ambrose Barber (January 26, 1852 – March 1, 1909) was a U.S. representative from Maryland, serving from 1897 to 1899.

== Biography ==
Born near Salem, New Jersey, Barber attended the common schools and studied medicine in Hahnemann Medical College of Philadelphia, from which he was graduated in 1872. He commenced practice in Woodstown, New Jersey, and later moved to Easton, Maryland in 1873 and continued the practice of medicine for fifteen years. He also engaged in the milling business.

He married Nellie V. Collison in 1878, and they had four children.

Barber served as a member of the Maryland House of Delegates in 1895, and later as president of the Farmers & Merchants' National Bank of Easton. He was elected as a Republican to the Fifty-fifth Congress from Maryland's 1st congressional district, serving one term from March 4, 1897, to March 3, 1899.

After Congress, he resumed the milling business and also engaged in agricultural pursuits. He also served as chairman of the Republican State central committee from 1900 to 1904. Barber died at his home in Easton on March 1, 1909, and is interred in Spring Hill Cemetery.

U.S. House of Representatives
Preceded by Joshua Weldon Miles	Member of the U.S. House of Representatives from Maryland's 1st congressional district 1897–1899	Succeeded by John Walter Smith
