= John Leeds Kerr =

American politician (1780–1844)

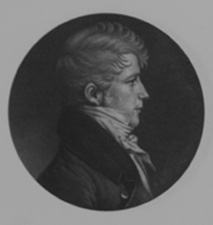

United States Senator from Maryland
- In office January 5, 1841 – March 3, 1843
- Preceded by: John S. Spence
- Succeeded by: James Pearce

Member of the U.S. House of Representatives from Maryland's 7th district
- In office March 4, 1825 – March 3, 1829
- Preceded by: William Hayward Jr.
- Succeeded by: Richard Spencer
- In office March 4, 1831 – March 3, 1833
- Preceded by: Richard Spencer
- Succeeded by: Francis Thomas

Personal details
- Born: January 15, 1780 Annapolis, Maryland, U.S.
- Died: February 21, 1844 (aged 64) Easton, Maryland, U.S.
- Party: Whig
- Children: John Bozman Kerr
- Relatives: Oswald Tilghman (grandson)

John Leeds Kerr (January 15, 1780 – February 21, 1844) was an American politician.

== Early years ==
Kerr was born in 1780 at Greenbury Point near Annapolis, Maryland, and graduated from St. John's College of Annapolis in 1799. He studied law, was admitted to the bar in 1801, and commenced practice in Easton, Maryland.

== Political career ==
Kerr was Deputy State's Attorney for Talbot County, Maryland, from 1806 to 1810. During the War of 1812, Kerr commanded a company of militia, and was later appointed agent of the State of Maryland in 1817 to prosecute claims against the federal government growing out of the War. In 1824, Kerr was elected to the Nineteenth and Twentieth Congresses, and served from March 4, 1825 to March 3, 1829. He was unsuccessful candidate for reelection in 1828, but was elected two years later in 1830 to the Twenty-second Congress, and served one term from March 4, 1831 to March 3, 1833. In Congress, Kerr served as chairman of the Committee on Territories (Twenty-second Congress). After Congress, he served as presidential elector on the Whig ticket in 1840

Kerr was elected to the United States Senate as a Whig to fill the vacancy caused by the death of John S. Spence and served from January 5, 1841, to March 3, 1843. In the Senate, Kerr served as chairman of the Committee on Public Buildings (Twenty-seventh Congress), and as a member of the Committee on Patents and the Patent Office (Twenty-seventh Congress). Kerr died in Easton in 1844, and is interred in the Bozman family cemetery at "Bellville", near Oxford Neck, Maryland.

Kerr's son, John Bozman Kerr, also served in Congress.

U.S. House of Representatives
Preceded by William Hayward, Jr.	Member of the U.S. House of Representatives from Maryland's 7th congressional district 1825–1829	Succeeded by Richard Spencer
Preceded by Richard Spencer	Member of the U.S. House of Representatives from Maryland's 7th congressional district 1831–1833	Succeeded by Francis Thomas
U.S. Senate
Preceded by John S. Spence	U.S. senator (Class 3) from Maryland; 1841–1843; Served alongside: William Duhurst Merrick	Succeeded by James Pearce
