= Joshua W. Miles =

American politician (1858–1929)

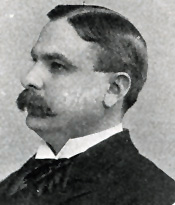
Joshua Weldon Miles

Joshua Weldon Miles (December 9, 1858 – March 4, 1929) was an American politician.

Born on his father’s farm on the Great Annamessex River, near the village of Marion, Somerset County, Maryland, Miles attended private schools and Marion Academy. He graduated from Western Maryland College of Westminster, Maryland, in 1878 and attended the law department of the University of Maryland, Baltimore. He was admitted to the bar in July 1880 and commenced practice in Princess Anne, Maryland.

Miles served as State's attorney of Somerset County from 1883 to 1887, but was an unsuccessful candidate for reelection. He ran for and was elected as a Democrat to the Fifty-fourth Congress, serving one term from March 4, 1895, to March 3, 1897, having been an unsuccessful candidate for reelection in 1896 to the Fifty-fifth Congress. He resumed the practice of law in Princess Anne, served as president of the Bank of Somerset from 1900 to 1929, and was a delegate at large to the Democratic National Conventions of 1900, 1912, 1920, and 1924. He was also a trustee of Western Maryland College for thirty years and collector of internal revenue for the district of Maryland from 1914 to 1921.

Miles died in Baltimore, Maryland, and is interred in Manokin Cemetery of Princess Anne.

U.S. House of Representatives
Preceded by Winder Laird Henry	Member of the U.S. House of Representatives from Maryland's 1st congressional district 1895–1897	Succeeded by Isaac Ambrose Barber
