= Spring Hill Cemetery (Easton, Maryland) =

Cemetery in Talbot County, Maryland, U.S.

Details
- Established: 1827
- Location: Easton, Maryland
- Country: United States
- Coordinates: 38.7766941°N 76.0725721°W
- Size: 20 acres (8.1 ha)
- No. of graves: 12,000
- Find a Grave: Spring Hill Cemetery

Spring Hill Cemetery is a cemetery on Aurora and North streets in Easton, Maryland. It is listed in the Maryland Inventory of Historic Properties for Talbot County by the Maryland Historical Trust.

== History ==
The land was purchased in 1802 by subscription. In 1827, a plot of ground was given by Dr. Ennalls Martin to the Christ Church for use as a cemetery. The first person to be buried was Martin's son, Bartholomew Ennalls Martin.

In 1847, a lot near the Christ Church's lot was purchased by the Methodist Church for its burying ground. By 1877, both churches had expanded the burial ground to the north end of Hanson Street and more acres were purchased from Colonel Samuel Hambleton. A fence was made to enclose the parcel and it was given the name Spring Hill.

A Gatekeeper's Lodge was at the west side of the main entrance gate. It was a small shingle-covered Victorian Gothic Cottage standing at one and a half stories. It was probably built around 1875 and destroyed around 1970.

During the presidential campaign of 1840, a large Whig Party meeting was held at the Spring Hill Cemetery. The meeting boasted between 15,000 and 20,000 people.

== Notable burials ==
- John Franklin "Home Run" Baker (1886–1963), professional baseball player
- Isaac Ambrose Barber (1852–1909), politician
- Samuel Barrott (1761–1851), "Little Drummer Boy" in American Revolutionary War and last surviving member of the Maryland Line
- J. Harry Covington (1870–1942), politician and jurist
- Samuel Hambleton (1812–1886), politician
- Richard C. Hollyday (1859–1936), Secretary of State of Maryland
- Henry C. Lay (1823–1885), bishop
- Daniel Martin (1780–1831), Governor of Maryland
- Samuel Stevens Jr. (1778–1860), Governor of Maryland
- Philip Francis Thomas (1810–1890), Governor of Maryland and U.S. Secretary of the Treasury
- Oswald Tilghman (1841–1932), soldier, politician and Secretary of State of Maryland

== See also ==
- List of cemeteries in Maryland
