= Richard Spencer (Maryland politician) =

American politician

Member of the U.S. House of Representatives from Maryland's 7th district
- In office March 4, 1829 – March 3, 1831
- Preceded by: John Leeds Kerr
- Succeeded by: John Leeds Kerr

Member of the Maryland House of Delegates
- In office 1823–1825

Personal details
- Born: Richard Spencer; October 29, 1796 Spencer Hall, Talbot County, Maryland, U.S.
- Died: September 3, 1868 (aged 72) Cottage Hill, near Mobile, Alabama, U.S.
- Party: Jacksonian

Richard Spencer (October 29, 1796 – September 3, 1868) was an American farmer, writer, and politician who represented the seventh congressional district of the state of Maryland from 1829 to 1831.

== Early life and education ==
Richard Spencer was born at Spencer Hall, the family plantation in Talbot County, Maryland, and attended the common schools. He studied law in Baltimore and was admitted to the Talbot County bar in 1819. He moved to his farm, Solitude, near St. Michaels, Maryland in 1822 and engaged in agricultural pursuits. He also served in the Maryland House of Delegates from 1823 to 1825.

== Writing ==
Spencer engaged in literary pursuits and, in 1828, he contributed to the establishment of the newspaper Eastern Shore Whig, which he controlled until 1834.

== Political career ==
In 1828, he was elected as a Jacksonian to the 21st Congress and served one term from March 4, 1829, until March 3, 1831. He was unsuccessful candidate for reelection in 1830 to the Twenty-second Congress. He served again in the Maryland House of Delegates in 1833 and 1834, but was an unsuccessful candidate for reelection in 1835.

== Post-congressional career and death ==
He moved to Georgia in 1837 and engaged in cotton planting, and later moved to Alabama in 1852 and settled at Cottage Hill, near Mobile. He died there on September 3, 1868, but it is unknown exactly where he was interred. He is most likely buried at his estate at Cottage Hill.

== Footnotes ==
U.S. House of Representatives
Preceded by John Leeds Kerr	Member of the U.S. House of Representatives from Maryland's 7th congressional district 1829–1831	Succeeded by John Leeds Kerr
