= John Bozman Kerr =

American politician (1809–1878)

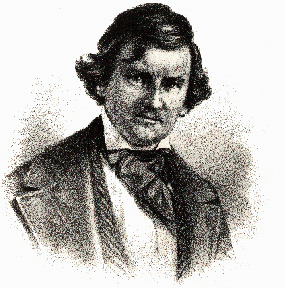
- Sketch of Kerr

Chargé d'Affaires to Nicaragua
- In office March 7, 1851 – July 27, 1853
- Appointed by: Millard Fillmore
- Preceded by: Office established
- Succeeded by: Solon Borland

Member of the U.S. House of Representatives from Maryland's 6th district
- In office March 4, 1849 – March 3, 1851

Member of the Maryland House of Delegates
- In office 1836–1838

Personal details
- Born: March 5, 1809 Easton, Maryland, U.S.
- Died: January 27, 1878 (aged 68) Washington, D.C., U.S.
- Resting place: Oxford Neck, Talbot County, Maryland, U.S.
- Party: Whig
- Spouse: Lucy Hamilton Stevens (m. 1849)
- Children: 10
- Parent: John Leeds Kerr (father)
- Education: Harvard University
- Occupation: Politician; lawyer

John Bozman Kerr (March 5, 1809 – January 27, 1878) was a U.S. Congressman, representing the sixth district of the state of Maryland from 1849 until 1851. He also served as Chargé d'Affaires to Nicaragua.

== Early life ==
John Bozman Kerr was born on March 5, 1809, in Easton, Maryland, to Sarah Hollyday (née Chamberlaine) and John Leeds Kerr. He attended the common schools and Easton Academy. He graduated from Harvard University in 1830. He attended Harvard with Oliver Wendell Holmes Sr., Charles Sumner, and John Osborn Sargent. He then studied law and left college in 1834.

== Career ==
Kerr was admitted to the bar and commenced practice in Easton in 1833. He served as a member of the Maryland House of Delegates from 1836 until 1838, and later as deputy attorney general for Talbot County from 1845 until 1848.

Kerr was elected as a Whig to the Thirty-first Congress, serving from March 4, 1849, until March 3, 1851, and was not a candidate for renomination in 1850. He was appointed by President Millard Fillmore Chargé d'Affaires to Nicaragua on March 7, 1851, and served until July 27, 1853. Kerr resumed the practice of law in Baltimore and St. Michaels, Maryland, in 1854.

Kerr was appointed one of the solicitors in the Court of Claims in Washington, D.C., and served from February 8, 1864, to June 25, 1868, when the position was abolished. He served as solicitor in the office of the Sixth Auditor of the Treasury Department from November 6, 1869, until his death.

== Personal life ==
Kerr married Lucy Hamilton Stevens on October 24, 1849. They had six sons and four daughters, Lucy Hamilton, John Bozman Jr., Leeds Clayborne, Arthur Dickens, Mark Brickell, Henrietta Maria, Halbert Stevens, Ruth Leeds, Kenneth Chamberlaine, and Sarah Covington.

== Death ==
Kerr died on January 27, 1878, in Washington, D.C. He was interred at his family's cemetery at "Bellville" near Oxford Neck in Talbot County.

U.S. House of Representatives
Preceded by John W. Crisfield	Member of the U.S. House of Representatives from Maryland's 6th congressional district March 4, 1849 – March 3, 1851	Succeeded by Joseph S. Cottman
Diplomatic posts
U.S. officially recognized Nicaragua on February 18, 1851	United States Chargé d'Affaires, Nicaragua; February 18, 1851 – June 1, 1853	Succeeded by Solon Borland
