= Maryland Route 33 =

State highway in Talbot County, Maryland, US

Maryland Route 33
- Maryland Route 33 highlighted in red

Route information
- Maintained by MDSHA
- Length: 23.17 mi (37.29 km)
- Existed: 1940–present
- Tourist routes: Chesapeake Country Scenic Byway

Major junctions
- West end: Black Walnut Point Road on Tilghman Island
- MD 579 near Saint Michaels; MD 329 near Royal Oak; MD 370 near Easton; MD 322 in Easton
- East end: Washington Street in Easton

Location
- Country: United States
- State: Maryland
- Counties: Talbot

Highway system
- Maryland highway system; Interstate; US; State; Scenic Byways
← MD 32	→ MD 34

Maryland Route 33 (MD 33) is a state highway in the U.S. state of Maryland. The state highway runs 23.17 mi (37.29 km) from Tilghman Island east to Washington Street in Easton. MD 33 connects Easton, the county seat of Talbot County, with all communities on the peninsula that juts west into the Chesapeake Bay between the Miles River and Eastern Bay on the north and the Tred Avon River and Choptank River on the south. The state highway passes through the historic town of Saint Michaels, home of the Chesapeake Bay Maritime Museum, and enters Tilghman Island by passing over Knapps Narrows on the busiest bascule drawbridge in the United States.

MD 33 between Easton and Saint Michaels was one of the original state roads outlined by the Maryland State Roads Commission in 1909. The state highway was constructed between Easton and Claiborne, the terminus of a ferry to Annapolis, in the late 1910s and early 1920s, and was originally designated MD 17. The portion of the highway between Claiborne and Tilghman Island was constructed as MD 451 in the early 1930s. The state highway was extended north to MD 404 in Matapeake on Kent Island when the western terminus of the ferry from Claiborne was moved to Romancoke in the late 1930s. MD 33 received its present number in a 1940 number swap with present MD 17. Following the shutdown of the ferry, MD 33 was extended west along MD 451 to Tilghman Island and the Romancoke–Matapeake highway was redesignated MD 8. In Easton, MD 33 was extended north along Washington Street in the late 1940s and then along Easton Parkway, now MD 322, in the mid-1960s, before the eastern terminus returned to its present location in the late 1970s.

== Route description ==
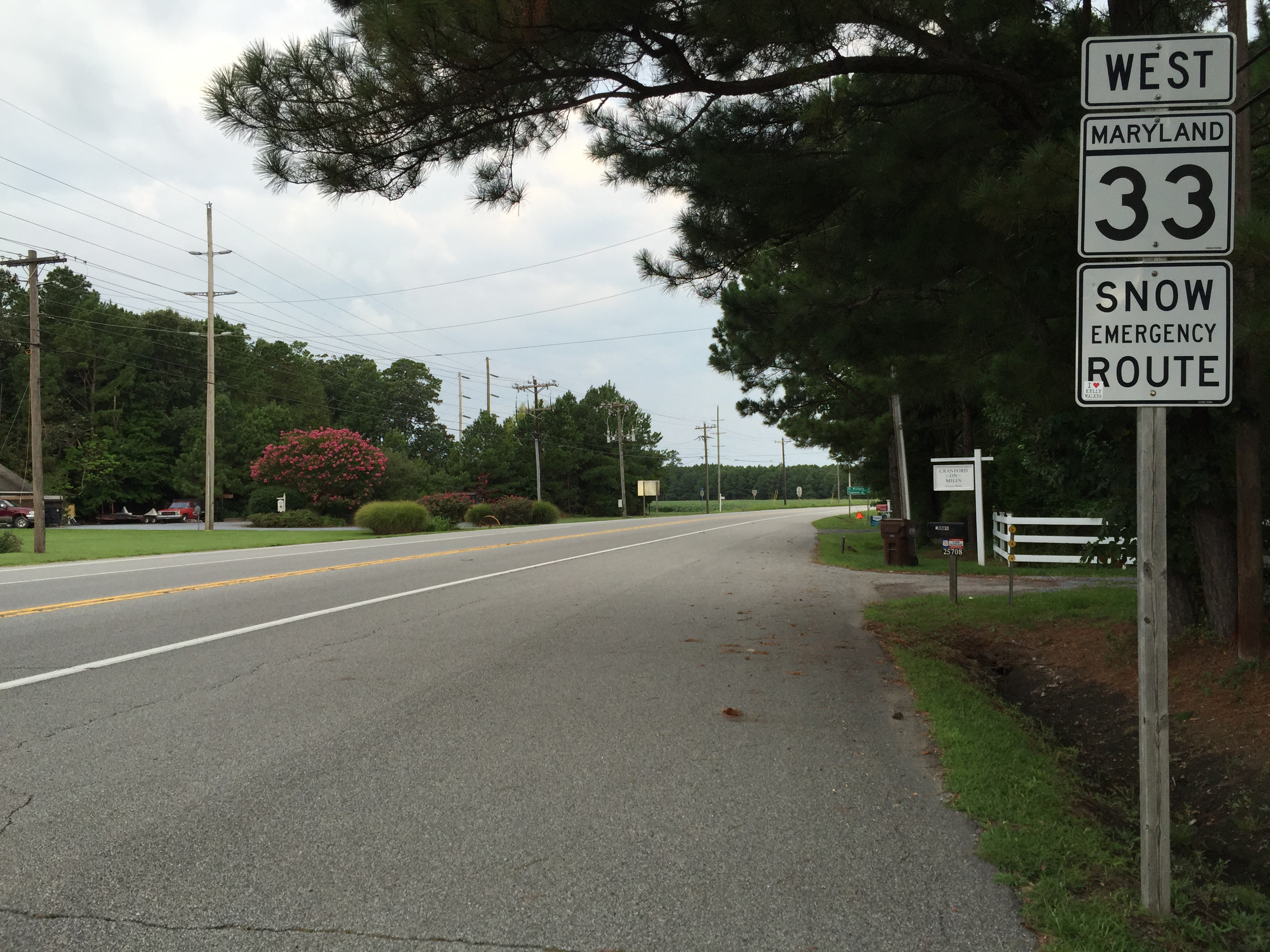
View west along MD 33 at MD 329 in Newcomb

MD 33 begins at the start of state maintenance 0.10 mi (0.16 km) south of Wharf Road and Phillips Road on Tilghman Island. The roadway continues south as Black Walnut Point Road, a county highway that leads to the namesake point at the south end of the island. MD 33 heads north through the village of Tilghman Island as two-lane undivided Tilghman Island Road, passing Tilghman Elementary School and many businesses before leaving the island by crossing Knapps Narrows on a single-bascule drawbridge that is the busiest of its type in the United States in terms of bridge openings. Shortly after leaving Tilghman Island, the state highway runs through a mix of forest and farmland, passing the hamlets of Sherwood and Wittman and several pieces of old alignment of the highway. MD 33 curves to the east around the head of Harris Creek and passes through McDaniel before reaching Claiborne Road, which was formerly MD 451 and heads northwest to the village of Claiborne.

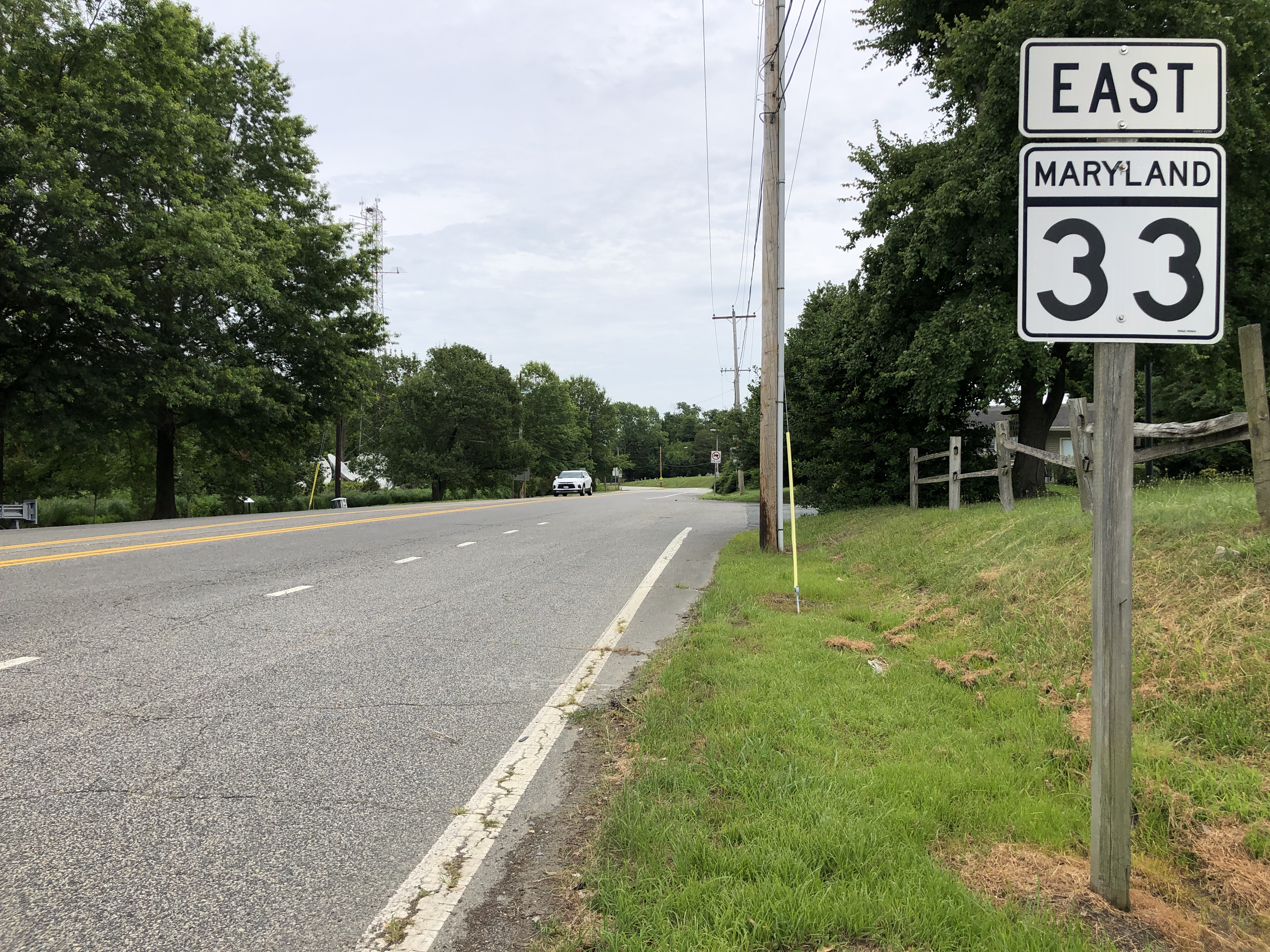
MD 33 eastbound past MD 322 in Easton

MD 33 continues southeast as St. Michaels Road. The state highway passes the northern terminus of MD 579 (Bozman Neavitt Road) and around the head of Broad Creek before curving south and passing through the town of Saint Michaels and its namesake historic district. MD 33 is known as Talbot Street within the town, where the highway passes the entrance to the Chesapeake Bay Maritime Museum, marked by the previous drawbridge over Knapps Narrows. The state highway curves to the southeast within the town and passes southwest of St. Michaels Middle/High School before it continues straight out of town through a mix of farmland and forests until the hamlet of Newcomb, where MD 329 (Royal Oak Road) splits to the south toward Royal Oak and Bellevue, the latter location being where the seasonal Oxford–Bellevue Ferry crosses the Tred Avon River to the town of Oxford, while MD 33 curves east to cross Oak Creek along the shore of the Miles River. MD 33 continues northeast, collecting the other end of MD 329 before passing a few riverfront subdivisions ahead of the intersection with the southern terminus of MD 370 (Unionville Road). A park and ride lot is located at the northwest corner of this intersection. Shortly after entering the town limits of Easton, the state highway crosses Tanyard Branch at the intersection with MD 322 (Easton Parkway), a bypass of the town that connects with US 50 in both directions. MD 33 continues east as Bay Street toward downtown Easton, where the highway reaches its eastern terminus at Washington Street.

MD 33 is a part of the National Highway System as a principal arterial from the west town limit of Easton to Washington Street.

== History ==
Maryland Route 17
- Location: Claiborne–Easton
- Existed: 1927–1940

The portion of present-day MD 33 between Easton and Saint Michaels was designated one of the original state roads when the Maryland State Roads Commission laid out the original state road system in 1909. However, the Easton–Saint Michaels road was not considered a necessary component of the system, so construction in its modern form was delayed in favor of the Easton–Wye Mills road. A 2-mile (3.2 km) section of the road between the eastern intersection with MD 329 and MD 370 was paved by 1910. The first sections of modern MD 33 constructed by the State Roads Commission were between Saint Michaels and Claiborne, which became the terminus of the Claiborne–Annapolis Ferry in 1919. Sections were completed between the two villages in 1919 and 1920. A section of the highway was also completed between Easton and the MD 370 intersection in 1920. The Easton–Claiborne Road was completed in 1924. When numbers were assigned to certain state highways beginning in 1927, the road was designated MD 17.

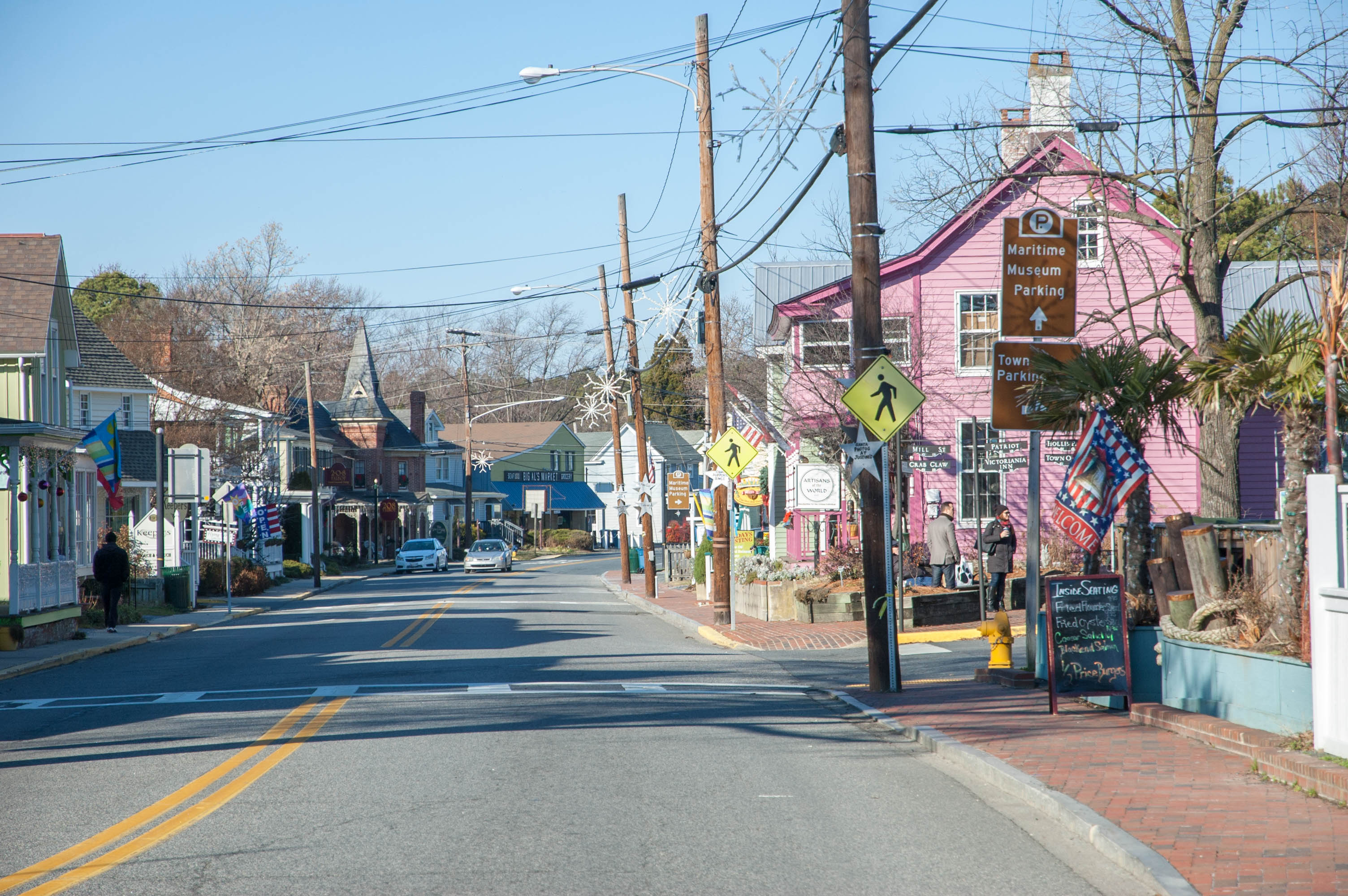
MD 33 westbound in Saint Michaels

The next section of present-day MD 33 was constructed between Claiborne and the highway's present western terminus on Tilghman Island as MD 451. The sections from Claiborne to a point between Wittman and Sherman and on Tilghman Island were completed around 1930. The gap between Knapps Narrows and Sherman was filled in 1933. MD 451 was completed when a new single bascule drawbridge was completed over Knapps Narrows in 1934. MD 17 was extended from Claiborne across Eastern Bay along Romancoke Road to MD 404 in Matapeake on Kent Island in 1938. This section was added in response to the replacement of the Claiborne–Annapolis ferry route with a Claiborne–Romancoke route in 1938, with traffic following the new section of MD 17 to Matapeake to take a second ferry across the Chesapeake Bay to Annapolis. MD 17 switched numbers with MD 33, the highway connecting Brunswick and Wolfsville in Frederick County that is now MD 17 in 1940.

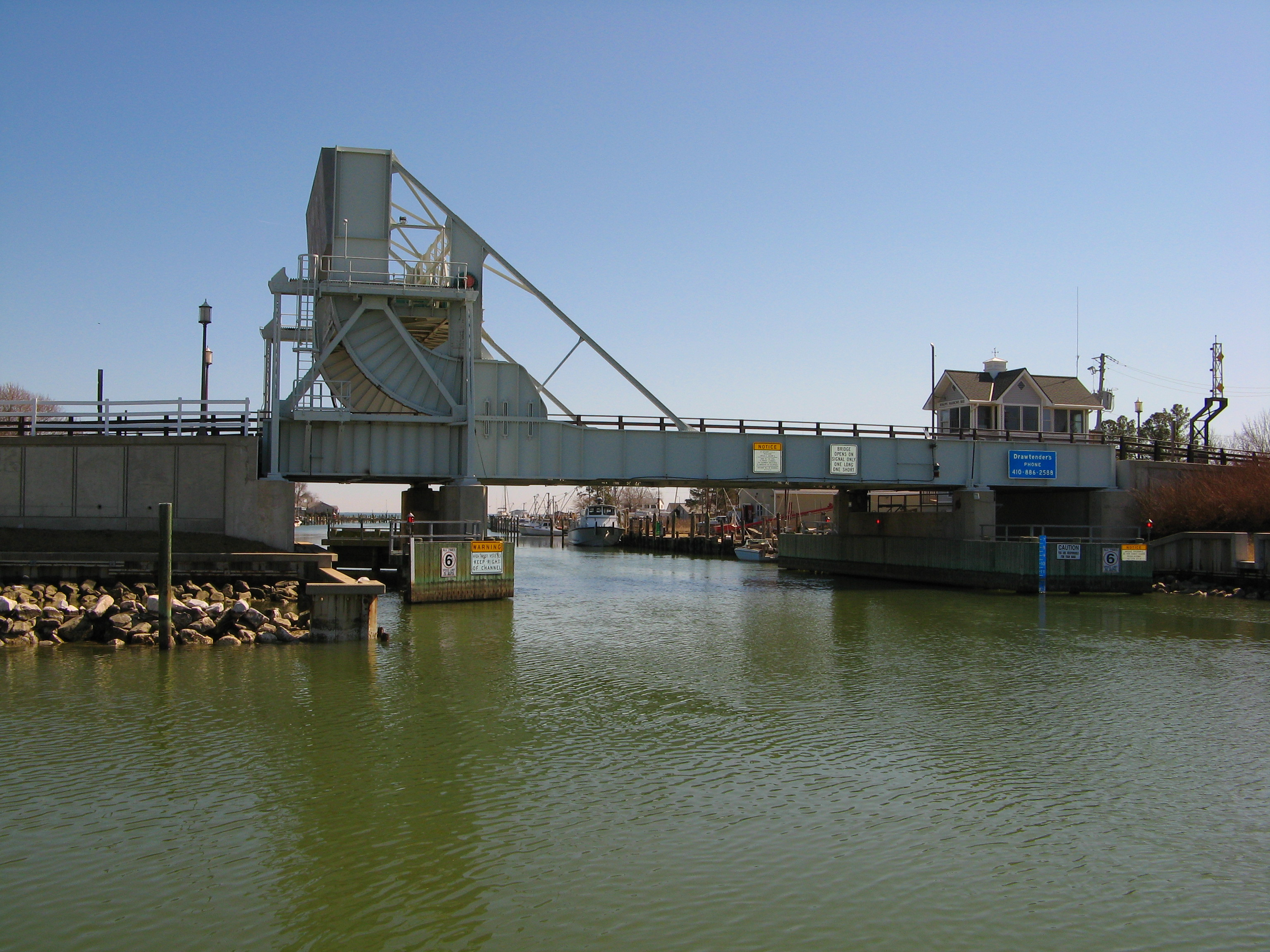
MD 33 drawbridge over Knapps Narrows to Tilghman Island

After a new, straighter US 213 (replaced by US 50 in 1949) was completed from south of Easton to Wye Mills in 1948, MD 33 was extended north along Washington Street within Easton to the new bypass. Following the closing of the Claiborne–Romancoke ferry in 1953, MD 33 and MD 451 switched alignments in 1957; MD 33 achieved its present western terminus at Tilghman Island while MD 451 became a short highway from MD 33 to Claiborne. MD 33 between Romancoke and Matapeake was redesignated MD 8 in 1960. MD 451 was removed from state maintenance in 1998.

Easton Parkway was constructed as a western bypass of Easton in the 1960s. MD 33 was moved from Washington Street to the part of the bypass north of present MD 33 when that section of Easton Parkway opened in 1965. MD 322, which was assigned to the southern part of Easton Parkway, replaced MD 33 on Bay Street between Easton Parkway and Washington Street, the latter of which became a northern extension of MD 565. In 1978, MD 322 was assigned to all of Easton Parkway and MD 33 assumed its present eastern terminus. The Knapps Narrows drawbridge was replaced by a new drawbridge in 1998. The 1934 drawbridge was transferred to the entrance of the Chesapeake Bay Maritime Museum in Saint Michaels.

== Junction list ==
The entire route is in Talbot County.

Location	mi	km	Destinations	Notes
Tilghman Island	0.00	0.00	Black Walnut Point Road south	Western terminus
Tilghman Island	0.87	1.40	Drawbridge over Knapps Narrows	
	10.81	17.40	MD 579 south (Bozman Neavitt Road) – Bozman, Neavitt	Northern terminus of MD 579
Newcomb	16.33	26.28	MD 329 east (Royal Oak Road) – Royal Oak, Oxford–Bellevue Ferry	Western terminus of MD 329
	18.43	29.66	MD 329 west (Royal Oak Road) – Royal Oak, Oxford–Bellevue Ferry	Eastern terminus of MD 329
	20.93	33.68	MD 370 north (Unionville Road) – Unionville	Southern terminus of MD 370
Easton	22.66	36.47	MD 322 (Easton Parkway) to US 50 – Bay Bridge, Oxford	
Easton	23.17	37.29	Washington Street	Eastern terminus
1.000 mi = 1.609 km; 1.000 km = 0.621 mi
