= List of Maryland state historical markers in Talbot County =

This is a list of the Maryland state historical markers in Talbot County.

This is intended to be a complete list of the official state historical markers placed in Talbot County, Maryland by the Maryland Historical Trust (MHT). The locations of the historical markers, as well as the latitude and longitude coordinates as provided by the MHT's database, are included below. There are currently 30 historical markers located in Talbot County.

Marker title	Image	City	Location	Topics
Betty's Cove Meeting House		Easton, Maryland	MD 370 (Unionville Road) at MD 33 (St. Michaels Road), northwest corner 38°47′01″N 76°07′02″W	
Birthplace of Tench Francis Jr.		Easton, Maryland	MD 565 (Washington Street) between MD 331 (Dover Street) and Goldsborough Street; 38°46′29.66″N 76°04′35.29″W	
Canterbury Mannor		Easton, Maryland	Baileys Neck Road (south side), 0.9 miles west of MD 333 (Oxford Road); 38°43′31.69″N 76°06′21.05″W	
Chesapeake Bay Skipjack Fleet		Tilghman Island, Maryland	MD 33 at Knapps Narrow Bridge, northwest side 38°43′16.06″N 76°19′52.41″W	
Compton		Trappe, Maryland	US 50 (Ocean Gateway) eastbound at MD 565 (Main Street); 38°39′06.02″N 76°03′26.28″W	
Fausley		Easton, Maryland	Villa Road (South side), 150 ft. west of Goldsborough Neck Road; 38°47′50″N 76°05′06″W	
Frederick Douglass		Matthews, Maryland	MD 328 (Matthewstown Road) north side, 100 ft. west of bridge over Tuckahoe Creek; 38°49′47.37″N 75°54′58.50″W	
Frederick Douglass		St. Michaels, Maryland	Talbot Street (MD 33) at Mill Street, northwest corner, in small park 38°47′13.79″N 76°13′28.02″W	
Grave of General Perry Benson		Newcomb, Maryland	Station Road (east side), 0.15 miles south of MD 33 (Saint Michaels Road); 38°45′07″N 76°10′43″W	
Hole In The Wall		Trappe, Maryland	US 50 (Ocean Gateway) at Almshouse Road, northwest corner 38°41′46″N 76°03′41″W	
Little Red Schoolhouse		Longwoods, Maryland	MD 662 (Longwoods Road) northwest side, 1.1 miles southwest of US 50; 38°51′34.98″N 76°04′39.17″W	
Matthew Tilghman		Claiborne, Maryland	Rich Neck Road (west side ), 0.2 miles north of Claiborne Road; 38°50′24″N 76°16′33″W	
Nathaniel (Nace) Hopkins		Trappe, Maryland	US 50 (Ocean Gateway) at Barber Road, northeast corner 38°39′07″N 76°03′24″W	
Old White Marsh Episcopal Church		Trappe, Maryland	US 50 (Ocean Gateway) at Manadier Road, northeast corner 38°41′47″N 76°03′37″W	
Old Wye Episcopal Church		Wye Mills, Maryland	MD 662 (Wye Mills Road), 0.3 mile south of MD 404 (Queen Anne Highway); 38°56′12.07″N 76°04′45.23″W	
Oxford		Oxford, Maryland	Morris Street (MD 333) at Caroline Street, in the triangle 38°41′04″N 76°10′15″W	
Oxford-Bellevue Ferry		Oxford, Maryland	MD 333 (Morris Street) at Strand Street, SW corner 38°41′34″N 76°10′27″W	
Peachblossom Meeting House		Easton, Maryland	US 50 (Ocean Gateway) east side, 0.2 miles south of MD 322 (Easton Parkway); 38°43′59.70″N 76°04′05.89″W	
Second Defense of St. Michaels		St. Michaels, Maryland	MD 33 (St. Michaels Road), 0.6 miles west of Martingham Road; 38°48′28.36″N 76°14′18.33″W	
Site of "The Rest"		Easton, Maryland	MD 370 (Unionville Road) west side at north end of Rest Circle; 38°47′32″N 76°07′25″W	
St. Joseph's Church		Queen Anne, Maryland	MD 404 (Queen Anne Highway) at Church Lane, southeast corner 38°55′46.71″N 76°00′44.22″W	
St. Michaels		St. Michaels, Maryland	MD 33 (Talbot Street) north side, 200 ft. east of Seymour Avenue; 38°46′46″N 76°13′11″W	
The Mannour of Ratcliffe		Easton, Maryland	MD 33 (St. Michaels Road), 1 mile west of MD 322 (Easton Parkway); 38°46′47″N 76°05′38″W	
The Talbot Resolves		Easton, Maryland	Washington Street (MD 565) between Goldsborough Street and Dover Street; 38°46′29.66″N 76°04′35.29″W	
The Wilderness		Trappe, Maryland	Southside Island Creek Road (south side), 2.2 miles west of Island Creek Road; 38°38′36.73″N 76°07′49.30″W	
The Wye Oak		Wye Mills, Maryland	MD 662, south of MD 404; 38°56′21.75″N 76°04′49.55″W	
Third Haven		Easton, Maryland	MD 565 (Washington Street), west side, 0.1 mile north of MD 333 (Peachblossom Road); 38°46′00.01″N 76°04′31.77″W	
Union Soldiers		Unionville, Maryland	MD 370 (Unionville Road) east side, 0.3 miles south of Tunis Mills Road; 38°48′32.45″N 76°08′23.71″W	
Unionville		Unionville, Maryland	MD 370 (Unionville Road) east side, 0.5 miles south of Tunis Mills Road; 38°48′21.64″N 76°08′19.37″W	
William Penn		Easton, Maryland	MD 322 (Easton Parkway), northbound, 0.1 mile south of Bay Street; 38°46′35.94″N 76°05′10.08″W	
