= Maryland Route 329 =

State highway in Maryland, United States

Maryland Route 329
- Royal Oak Road
- Maryland Route 329 highlighted in red

Route information
- Maintained by MDSHA
- Length: 3.29 mi (5.29 km)
- Existed: 1927–present
- Tourist routes: Chesapeake Country Scenic Byway

Major junctions
- West end: MD 33 west of Royal Oak
- East end: MD 33 east of Royal Oak

Location
- Country: United States
- State: Maryland
- Counties: Talbot

Highway system
- Maryland highway system; Interstate; US; State; Scenic Byways
← MD 328	→ MD 330

Maryland Route 329 (MD 329) is a state highway in the U.S. state of Maryland. Known as Royal Oak Road, the state highway runs east-west 3.29 miles (5.29 km) through Royal Oak in western Talbot County, connecting with MD 33 at both termini. MD 329, which formed part of the original road between Easton and Saint Michaels, was constructed as a shell road by the time it was brought under Maryland State Roads Commission maintenance in the mid-1920s.

== Route description ==
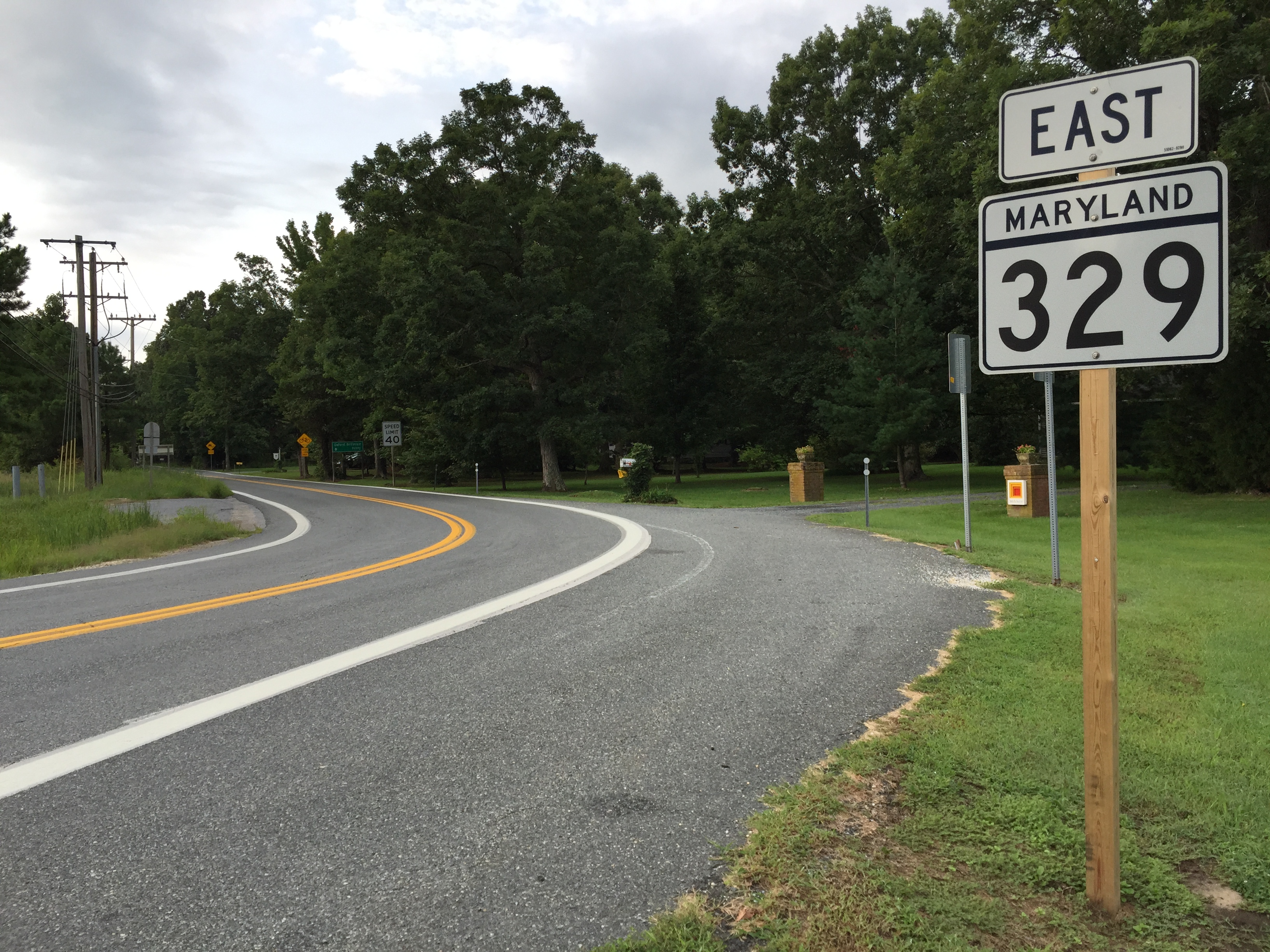
View east along MD 329 at MD 33 in Newcomb

MD 329 begins at an intersection with MD 33 (St. Michaels Road) just west of the village of Newcomb. The two-lane undivided state highway heads south, skirting the southern edge of the community. MD 329 enters the community of Royal Oak, where the highway passes around a branch of Oak Creek and curves to the east. The state highway intersects Bellevue Road, which heads south toward Bellevue and that village's dock of the seasonal Oxford–Bellevue Ferry across the Tred Avon River to the town of Oxford. MD 329 continues east past farmland and scattered residences, heading around the other branch of Oak Creek. After Hopkins Neck Road, the state highway heads straight northeast through a forested area to its eastern terminus at MD 33.

== History ==
MD 329 follows the path of the original road between Easton and Saint Michaels, which generally followed present-day MD 33 except for dipping south around the head of Oak Creek and passing through Royal Oak. When MD 33 was constructed in the early 1920s, it paralleled the Baltimore, Chesapeake and Atlantic Railway through Newcomb. The Maryland State Roads Commission assumed maintenance of the shell road through Royal Oak by 1927.

== Junction list ==
The entire route is in Talbot County.

Location	mi	km	Destinations	Notes
Newcomb	0.00	0.00	MD 33 (St. Michaels Road) – St. Michaels, Tilghman Island	Western terminus
Royal Oak	1.01	1.63	Bellevue Road south – Oxford–Bellevue Ferry	
	3.29	5.29	MD 33 (St. Michaels Road) – Easton	Eastern terminus
1.000 mi = 1.609 km; 1.000 km = 0.621 mi
