= Third Haven Meeting House =

Church building in Maryland, US

Coordinates: 38°45′59″N 76°4′37″W

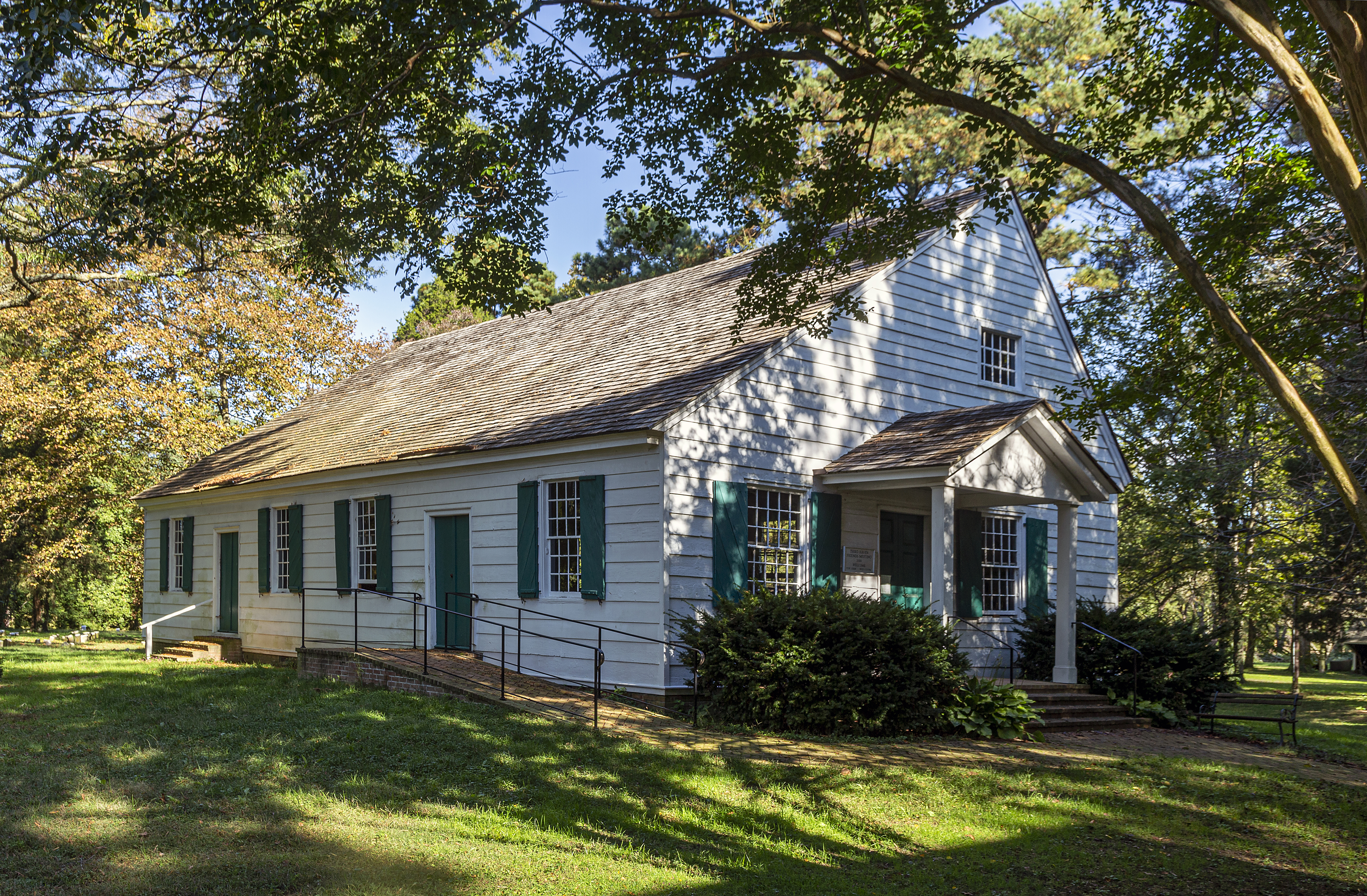
Third Haven Meeting House in 2020

The Third Haven Meeting House is generally considered the oldest-surviving Friends meeting house of the Religious Society of Friends in America, and it is a cornerstone of Quaker history in Talbot County, Maryland.

== History ==
The history of Quakerism in Talbot County goes back as far as the earliest European settlements of the area in 1658 and 1659. By the early 1660s, at least four Friends meetings were in existence: Bayside, along the Chesapeake Bay; Choptank and Tuckahoe, along the rivers of those names; and Michael's River, along what is now known as the Miles River. The latter of these corresponds to the first meeting of Maryland, which was birthed from a visit to Talbot County by George Fox, and it was also the first meeting to be moved away from the home of one of the Friends (Wenlock Christison) into an actual meeting house. It was named Betty's Cove, constructed at an indeterminate date. As the Quaker population of Talbot County continued to grow, more meeting houses were built to house three additional meetings.

In 1681, a need was recognized for a new meeting house. Construction began along the river Third Haven (now known as Tred Avon), on a 3-acre (1.2 ha) plot of land from John Edmondson, a wealthy merchant and long-standing Quaker resident of the Eastern Shore. Originally known as the "Great Meetinghouse," the house at Third Haven was to be "sixty foote long, forty four foote wide...framed with good white oak...the roof double raftered and studded," constructed with north, south, east, and west wings.

The first meeting at Third Haven took place on August 14, 1684, and construction was finished soon afterward. In 1693, the congregation of Betty's Cove merged with Third Haven. As part of the tradition of Maryland Quakerism, two yearly meetings of all Maryland Quakers would take place—one in autumn on the East Shore, and one in spring on the West Shore. The autumnal meeting took place at the Great Meetinghouse on Third Haven, while the vernal meeting took place at West River near Annapolis. In time, the Third Haven monthly meeting included other meeting groups besides the one at Third Haven, including the other three original Talbot County meetings, two in Dorchester County and one in Caroline County.

In 1797, the east and west wings of the building were removed; the entire structure was widened by 10 feet (3.0 m) along its length, giving it a slightly unbalanced look which has been commented upon.

In 1880, an additional brick building was constructed for use in the winter months. Unlike the original meeting house, it has electricity, heating, and plumbing.

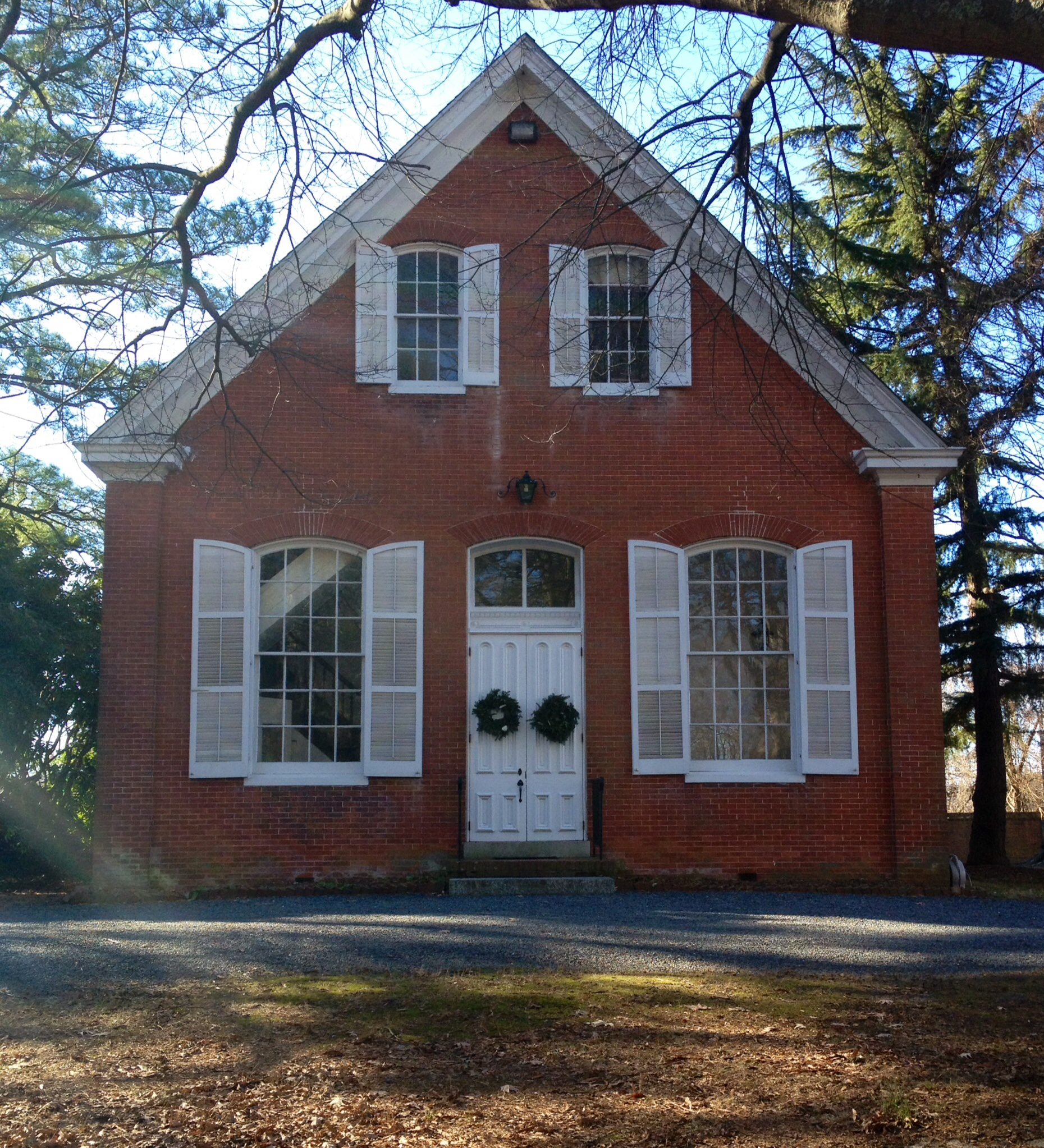
Brick Meeting House in Easton, Maryland

== Present day ==
The Great Meetinghouse is the only Third Haven Monthly Meeting to survive into the third millennium, and it still maintains a healthy congregation. Worship meetings are held every Sunday morning and Wednesday evening. The building itself has attracted a great deal of interest by historians and locals to the town of Easton, and is a common destination for visitors to the Eastern Shore.

== See also ==
- Oldest buildings in the United States
