= Unionville, Maryland =

Unionville, Maryland may refer to:

- Unionville, Frederick County, Maryland, an unincorporated community in Frederick County
- Unionville, Talbot County, Maryland, an unincorporated community in Talbot County
- Unionville, Worcester County, Maryland, an unincorporated community in Worcester County
