= Maryland Route 370 =

State highway in Maryland, United States

Maryland Route 370
- Unionville Road
- Maryland Route 370 highlighted in red

Route information
- Maintained by MDSHA
- Length: 1.58 mi (2.54 km)
- Existed: 1927–present

Major junctions
- South end: MD 33 near Easton
- North end: Miles River Road near Unionville

Location
- Country: United States
- State: Maryland
- Counties: Talbot

Highway system
- Maryland highway system; Interstate; US; State; Scenic Byways
← I-370	→ MD 371

Maryland Route 370 (MD 370) is a state highway in the U.S. state of Maryland. Known as Unionville Road, the state highway runs 1.58 miles (2.54 km) from MD 33 near Easton to Miles River Road near Unionville. MD 370 connects Easton with the northwestern Talbot County villages of Unionville and Tunis Mills, which are separated from the county seat by the Miles River. The Miles River Bridge was constructed in the early 1910s. MD 370 was completed in the early 1930s when the bridge was connected with a modern road to MD 33.

== Route description ==
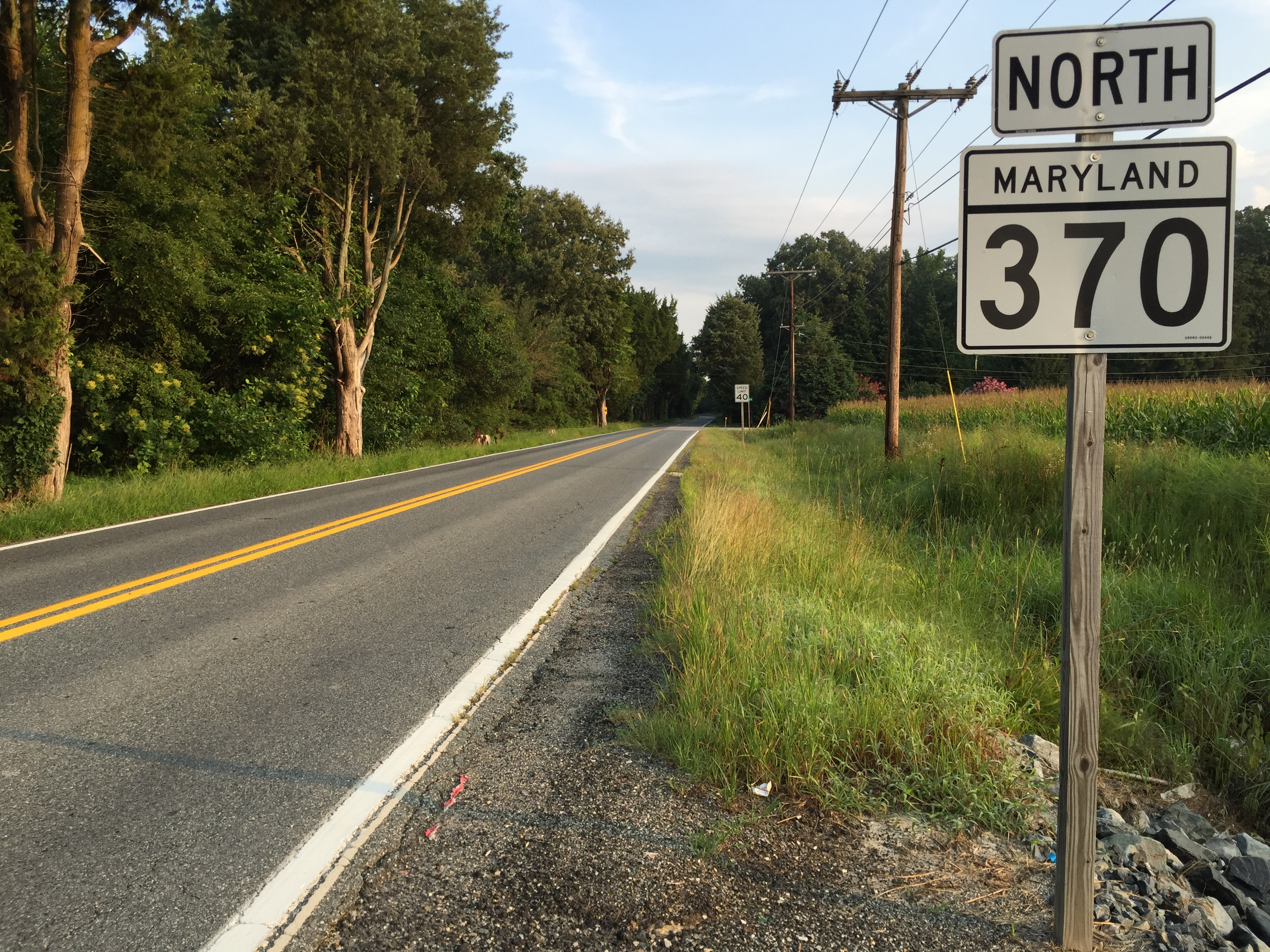
View north along MD 370 at MD 33 near Easton

MD 370 begins at an intersection with MD 33 (St. Michaels Road) a short distance west of the town of Easton. A park and ride lot is located at the northwest corner of this intersection. The state highway heads northwest as a two-lane undivided road through a mix of farmland and residential subdivisions. MD 370 crosses the Miles River on a bascule drawbridge before reaching its northern terminus at an intersection with Miles River Road near Unionville. Unionville Road continues north as a county highway toward the center of Unionville and Tunis Mills.

== History ==
The original Miles River Bridge was constructed as a state-aid project in 1913, along with 2 mi (3.2 km) of roads connecting the bridge to Unionville and Tunis Mills. The bridge was connected with a modern road to MD 33 by 1933. The original Miles River Bridge was replaced by the present bridge in 1984.

== Junction list ==
The entire route is in Talbot County.

Location	mi	km	Destinations	Notes
Easton	0.00	0.00	MD 33 (St. Michaels Road) – Easton, Saint Michaels	Southern terminus
Unionville	1.58	2.54	Unionville Road north / Miles River Road west	Northern terminus
1.000 mi = 1.609 km; 1.000 km = 0.621 mi
