= Doncaster, Talbot County, Maryland =

Unincorporated community in Maryland, United States

Doncaster, Maryland
- Unincorporated community
- Location within Maryland
- Coordinates: 38°47′03″N 76°07′54″W
- Country: United States
- State: Maryland
- County: Talbot
- Elevation: 13 ft (4.0 m)
- Time zone: UTC-5 (Eastern (EST))
  - Summer (DST): UTC-4 (EDT)
- Area codes: 410, 443, and 667
- GNIS feature ID: 592718

Doncaster is an unincorporated community in Talbot County, Maryland, United States. Doncaster is located along Maryland Route 33, 3 miles (4.8 km) west of Easton.
