= 1936 United States presidential election in Maryland =

- November 3, 1936

All 8 Maryland votes to the Electoral College

Nominee	Franklin D. Roosevelt	Alf Landon
Party	Democratic	Republican
Home state	New York	Kansas
Running mate	John Nance Garner	Frank Knox
Electoral vote	8	0
Popular vote	389,612	231,435
Percentage	62.35%	37.04%
County results
Roosevelt
50–60%
60–70%
Landon
40–50%
50–60%
President before election
Franklin D. Roosevelt
Democratic
Elected President
Franklin D. Roosevelt
Democratic

The 1936 United States presidential election in Maryland took place on November 3, 1936, as part of the 1936 United States presidential election. State voters chose eight representatives, or electors, to the Electoral College, who voted for president and vice president.

Maryland was won by incumbent President Franklin D. Roosevelt (D–New York), running with Vice President John Nance Garner, with 62.35% of the popular vote, against Governor Alf Landon (R–Kansas), running with Frank Knox, with 37.04% of the popular vote.

Maryland weighed in for this election as Roosevelt's strongest performance in any of the border states. In this election, Maryland voted 1.06% to the left of the nation at-large.

== Results ==
1936 United States presidential election in Maryland
Party	Candidate	Votes	%
Democratic	Franklin D. Roosevelt (inc.)	389,612	62.35%
Republican	Alf Landon	231,435	37.04%
Socialist	Norman Thomas	1,629	0.26%
Socialist Labor	John Aiken	1,305	0.21%
Communist	Earl Browder	915	0.15%
Total votes		624,896	100%

=== Results by county ===
County	Franklin Delano Roosevelt Democratic		Alfred Mossman Landon Republican		Various candidates Other parties		Margin		Total votes cast
County	#	%	#	%	#	%	#	%	Total votes cast
Allegany	19,721	63.20%	11,191	35.87%	291	0.93%	8,530	27.34%	31,203
Anne Arundel	11,413	56.97%	8,478	42.32%	142	0.71%	2,935	14.65%	20,033
Baltimore	28,367	59.62%	18,893	39.71%	316	0.66%	9,474	19.91%	47,576
Baltimore City	210,668	67.89%	97,667	31.48%	1,959	0.63%	113,001	36.42%	310,294
Calvert	1,872	47.05%	2,082	52.32%	25	0.63%	-210	-5.28%	3,979
Caroline	3,579	57.67%	2,611	42.07%	16	0.26%	968	15.60%	6,206
Carroll	6,496	46.54%	7,383	52.90%	78	0.56%	-887	-6.36%	13,957
Cecil	4,914	57.26%	3,617	42.15%	51	0.59%	1,297	15.11%	8,582
Charles	2,597	49.15%	2,623	49.64%	64	1.21%	-26	-0.49%	5,284
Dorchester	5,293	58.56%	3,735	41.32%	11	0.12%	1,558	17.24%	9,039
Frederick	10,722	52.85%	9,500	46.83%	64	0.32%	1,222	6.02%	20,286
Garrett	3,252	44.11%	4,057	55.03%	64	0.87%	-805	-10.92%	7,373
Harford	6,165	53.46%	5,327	46.20%	39	0.34%	838	7.27%	11,531
Howard	4,138	60.63%	2,638	38.65%	49	0.72%	1,500	21.98%	6,825
Kent	2,931	53.22%	2,543	46.18%	33	0.60%	388	7.05%	5,507
Montgomery	13,246	56.29%	10,133	43.06%	153	0.65%	3,113	13.23%	23,532
Prince George's	15,087	64.76%	8,107	34.80%	101	0.43%	6,980	29.96%	23,295
Queen Anne's	3,548	64.47%	1,946	35.36%	9	0.16%	1,602	29.11%	5,503
Somerset	4,116	45.95%	4,770	53.25%	72	0.80%	-654	-7.30%	8,958
St. Mary's	2,829	54.00%	2,286	43.63%	124	2.37%	543	10.36%	5,239
Talbot	3,768	51.16%	3,578	48.58%	19	0.26%	190	2.58%	7,365
Washington	14,050	56.84%	10,619	42.96%	49	0.20%	3,431	13.88%	24,718
Wicomico	7,273	61.05%	4,545	38.15%	95	0.80%	2,728	22.90%	11,913
Worcester	3,567	53.25%	3,106	46.37%	25	0.37%	461	6.88%	6,698
Totals	389,612	62.35%	231,435	37.04%	3,849	0.62%	158,177	25.31%	624,896

==== Counties that flipped from Democratic to Republican ====
- Carroll
- Charles
- Somerset

== See also ==
- United States presidential elections in Maryland
- 1936 United States presidential election
- 1936 United States elections
