= McDaniel, Maryland =

Unincorporated community in Maryland, United States

- Unincorporated community
- Location within Maryland
- Coordinates: 38°49′03″N 76°16′41″W
- Country: United States
- State: Maryland
- County: Talbot
- Elevation: 16 ft (4.9 m)
- Time zone: UTC-5 (Eastern (EST))
  - Summer (DST): UTC-4 (EDT)
- ZIP code: 21647
- Area codes: 410, 443, and 667
- GNIS feature ID: 590773

McDaniel is an unincorporated community in Talbot County, Maryland, United States. McDaniel is located along Maryland Route 33, south of Claiborne and a short distance east of the Chesapeake Bay.
