= Lloyd Landing, Maryland =

Unincorporated community in Maryland, United States

- Unincorporated community
- Location within Maryland
- Coordinates: 38°41′54″N 75°59′56″W
- Country: United States
- State: Maryland
- County: Talbot
- Elevation: 7 ft (2.1 m)
- Time zone: UTC-5 (Eastern (EST))
  - Summer (DST): UTC-4 (EDT)
- Area codes: 410 & 443
- GNIS feature ID: 590679

Lloyd Landing (also Lloyd, Lloyds, Lloyds Landing) is an unincorporated community in Talbot County, Maryland, United States. It is located on The Choptank River.
