= Tunis Mills, Maryland =

Unincorporated community in Maryland, United States

- Unincorporated community
- Location within Maryland
- Coordinates: 38°49′13″N 76°09′59″W
- Country: United States
- State: Maryland
- County: Talbot
- Elevation: 3 ft (0.91 m)
- Time zone: UTC-5 (Eastern (EST))
  - Summer (DST): UTC-4 (EDT)
- Area codes: 410 & 443
- GNIS feature ID: 591439

Tunis Mills is an unincorporated community in Talbot County, Maryland, United States. Tunis Mills is located on the southeast bank of Leeds Creek, 5.8 miles (9.3 km) west-northwest of Easton.
