= Unionville, Worcester County, Maryland =

Unincorporated community in Maryland, United States

Unionville, Maryland
- Unincorporated community
- Location within Maryland
- Coordinates: 38°03′38″N 75°35′57″W
- Country: United States
- State: Maryland
- County: Worcester
- Elevation: 20 ft (6.1 m)
- Time zone: UTC-5 (Eastern (EST))
  - Summer (DST): UTC-4 (EDT)
- Area codes: 410, 443
- GNIS feature ID: 591455

Unionville is an unincorporated community in Worcester County, Maryland, United States. Unionville is 2 miles (3.2 km) southwest of Pocomoke City.
