= Seth Demonstration Forest =

State forest in Maryland, United States

Coordinates: 38°45′5″N 76°2′10″W

Seth Demonstration Forest is a state forest in the state of Maryland. The original 65 acres was given by the widow of General Joseph B. Seth who died in 1927.
