= Royal Oak, Maryland =

Unincorporated community in Maryland, United States

- Unincorporated community
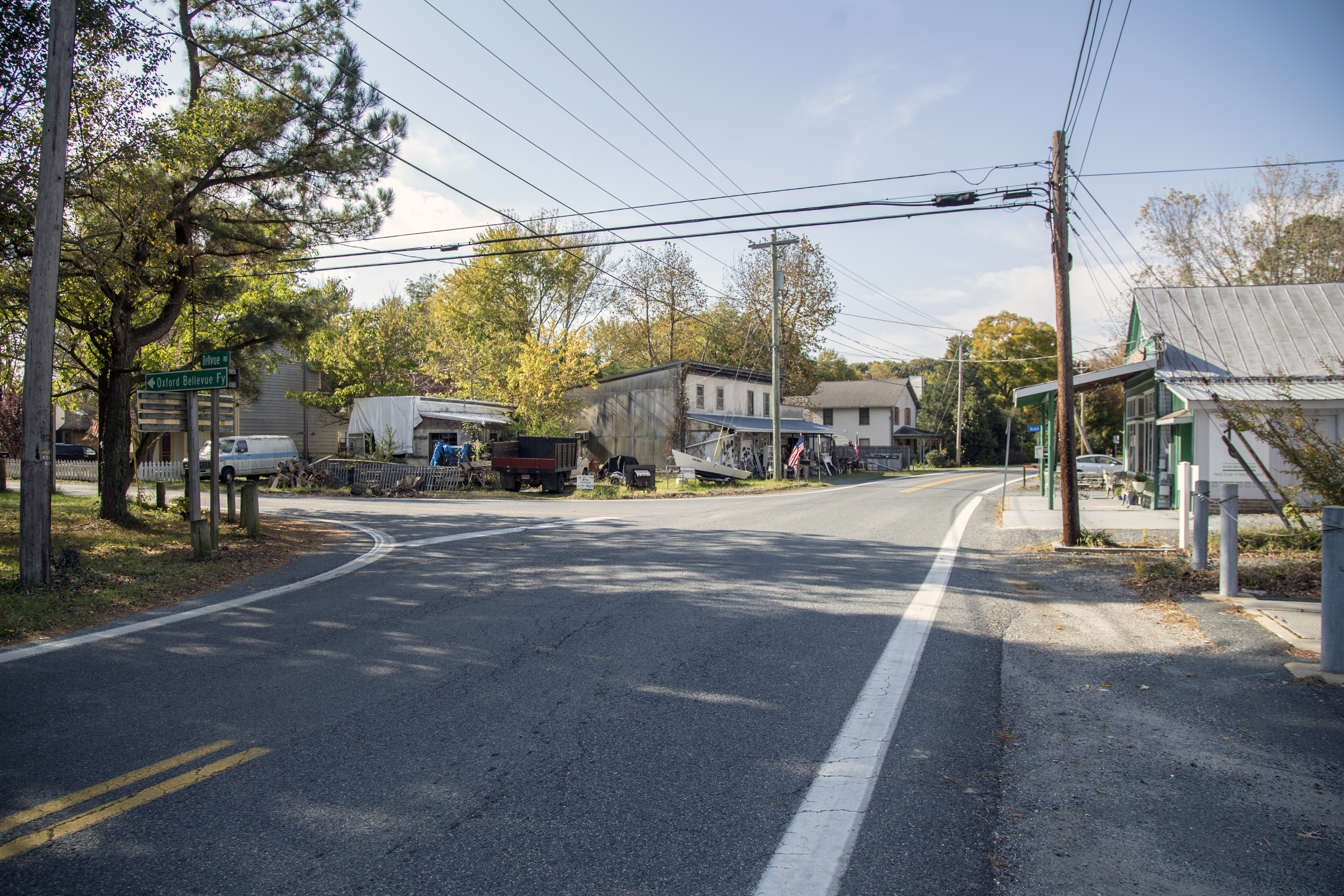
- Royal Oak in 2017

- Location within Maryland Location within the United States
- Coordinates: 38°44′32″N 76°10′40″W
- Country: United States
- State: Maryland
- County: Talbot
- Elevation: 7 ft (2.1 m)
- Time zone: UTC-5 (Eastern (EST))
  - Summer (DST): UTC-4 (EDT)
- ZIP code: 21662
- Area codes: 410, 443, and 667
- GNIS feature ID: 591197

Royal Oak is an unincorporated community in Talbot County, Maryland, United States. Royal Oak is located at the intersection of Maryland Route 329 and Bellevue Road, southeast of St. Michaels.

== History ==
Settlement in the Royal Oak area dates back to land grants recorded in 1659, predating nearby towns such as Easton and St. Michaels. The community derived its name from an ancient oak tree, originally known as Bartlett's Oak, which stood on the land of John Bartlett near Bellevue Road. During the American Revolutionary War and the War of 1812, a local militia unit called the "Hearts of Oak" used the massive tree as a muster point for roll call.

Royal Oak was formally recognized by the United States federal government in 1837 upon the opening of its first post office.

== Climate ==
The climate in this area is characterized by hot, humid summers and generally mild to cool winters. According to the Köppen Climate Classification system, Royal Oak has a humid subtropical climate, abbreviated "Cfa" on climate maps.

Climate data for Royal Oak, Maryland (1991–2020 normals, extremes 1948–present)
Month	Jan	Feb	Mar	Apr	May	Jun	Jul	Aug	Sep	Oct	Nov	Dec	Year
Record high °F (°C)	77 (25)	77 (25)	87 (31)	93 (34)	97 (36)	101 (38)	102 (39)	101 (38)	97 (36)	95 (35)	84 (29)	76 (24)	102 (39)
Mean daily maximum °F (°C)	44.6 (7.0)	47.4 (8.6)	55.6 (13.1)	66.9 (19.4)	75.4 (24.1)	83.7 (28.7)	88.1 (31.2)	86.3 (30.2)	80.1 (26.7)	69.0 (20.6)	57.9 (14.4)	48.6 (9.2)	67.0 (19.4)
Daily mean °F (°C)	36.9 (2.7)	39.0 (3.9)	46.4 (8.0)	56.7 (13.7)	65.8 (18.8)	74.6 (23.7)	79.1 (26.2)	77.2 (25.1)	70.8 (21.6)	59.8 (15.4)	49.3 (9.6)	41.0 (5.0)	58.0 (14.4)
Mean daily minimum °F (°C)	29.3 (−1.5)	30.5 (−0.8)	37.2 (2.9)	46.6 (8.1)	56.2 (13.4)	65.5 (18.6)	70.1 (21.2)	68.0 (20.0)	61.5 (16.4)	50.6 (10.3)	40.8 (4.9)	33.3 (0.7)	49.1 (9.5)
Record low °F (°C)	−6 (−21)	−3 (−19)	10 (−12)	23 (−5)	35 (2)	43 (6)	51 (11)	45 (7)	37 (3)	25 (−4)	16 (−9)	4 (−16)	−6 (−21)
Average precipitation inches (mm)	3.52 (89)	3.06 (78)	4.39 (112)	3.67 (93)	3.95 (100)	4.04 (103)	4.34 (110)	4.78 (121)	4.18 (106)	4.36 (111)	3.38 (86)	3.94 (100)	47.61 (1,209)
Average snowfall inches (cm)	5.1 (13)	4.8 (12)	2.3 (5.8)	0.1 (0.25)	0.0 (0.0)	0.0 (0.0)	0.0 (0.0)	0.0 (0.0)	0.0 (0.0)	0.0 (0.0)	0.0 (0.0)	1.8 (4.6)	14.1 (36)
Average precipitation days	10.3	9.6	11.0	10.6	10.8	9.9	9.8	8.9	7.9	9.2	8.8	11.0	117.8
Average snowy days (≥ 0.1 in)	2.2	2.0	0.9	0.1	0.0	0.0	0.0	0.0	0.0	0.0	0.0	1.0	6.2
Source: NOAA
