= Tred Avon River =

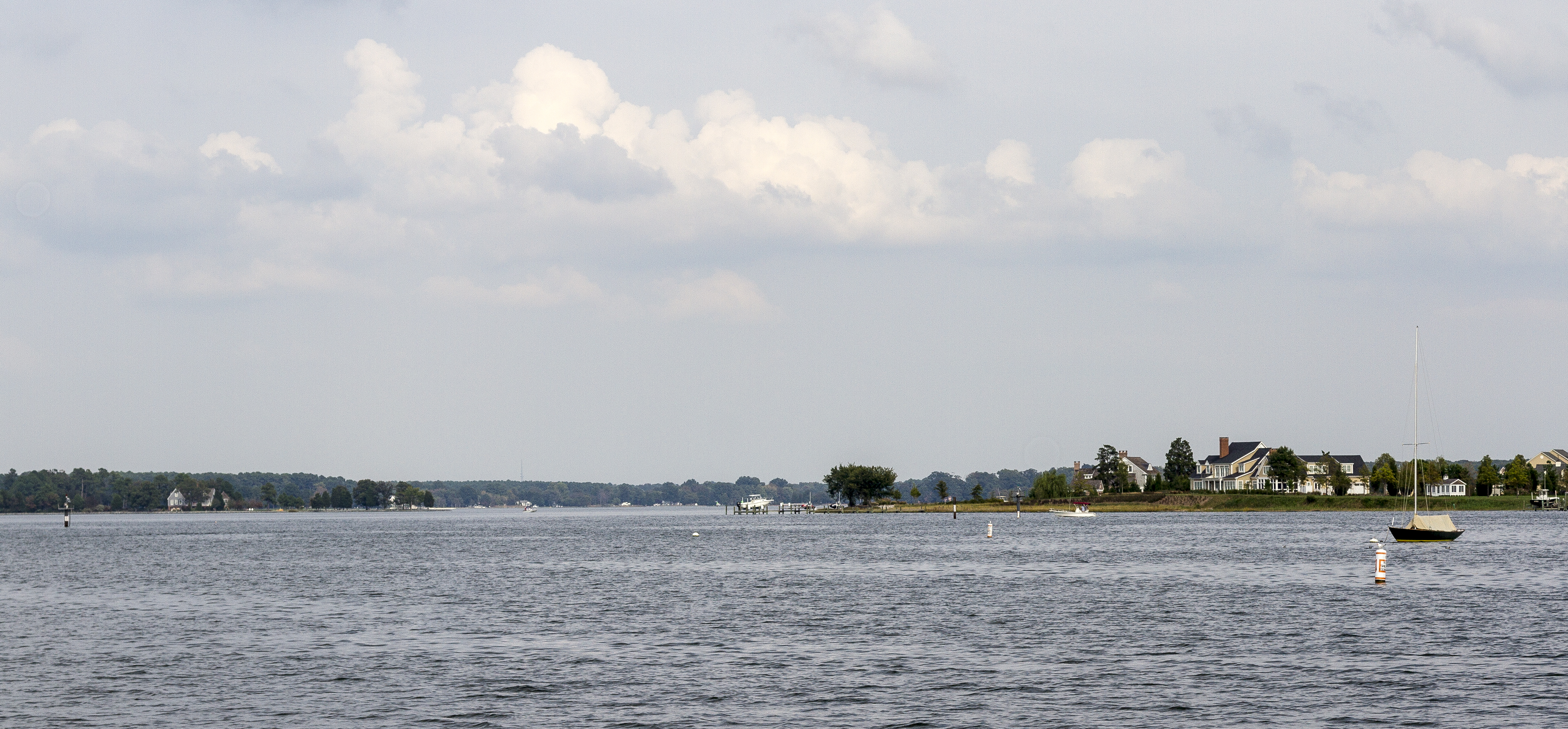
- The Tred Avon from the Oxford–Bellevue Ferry at Oxford
- Etymology: Corruption of "Third Haven"

Location
- Country: United States
- State: Maryland
- Region: Eastern Shore
- Cities: Easton, Oxford

Physical characteristics
- Source: Seth Demonstration Forest
  - coordinates: 38°45′12.4164″N 76°02′03.7824″W
  - elevation: 65 ft (20 m)
- Mouth: Choptank River
  - location: Benoni Point
  - coordinates: 38°40′02.4276″N 76°11′08.8002″W
  - elevation: 0 ft (0 m)

Basin features
- Tributaries
  - left: Papermill Pond, Jacks Creek, Playtors Creek, Peachblossom Creek, Trippe Creek, Goldsborough Creek, Town Creek
  - right: Dixon Creek, Shipshead Creek, Maxmore Creek, Plaindealing Creek, Fox Hole Creek

The Tred Avon River (a corruption of "Third Haven River") is a main tributary of the Choptank River in Talbot County on Maryland's Eastern Shore. The river is 17 miles (27 km) long.

== Geography ==
The Tred Avon's headwaters are located approximately 2.5 miles (4.0 km) southeast of Easton, the county seat. The river flows 5 miles (8 km) roughly west past the city then widens and flows southwest about 12 miles (19 km) to the mouth just south of Oxford at Benoni Point. The mouth is marked by the Choptank River Light, a 35-foot spider in the main channel.

== Name ==
"Tred Avon" is a corruption of "Third Haven." It follows the dropped 'h' characteristic of early Chesapeake sailors from western England. The United States Geological Survey's Geographic Names Information System lists the following variant names for the Tred Avon River:

- Third Haven Creek
- Third Haven River
- Threadhaven Creek
- Trad Avon River
- Tread Haven Creek
- Treavon Creek
- Tred Aven River
- Tred Haven River
- Tredaven Creek
- Tredaven Creeke
- Tredavon Creeke
- Tredhaven Creek
- Trudhaven River

== History ==
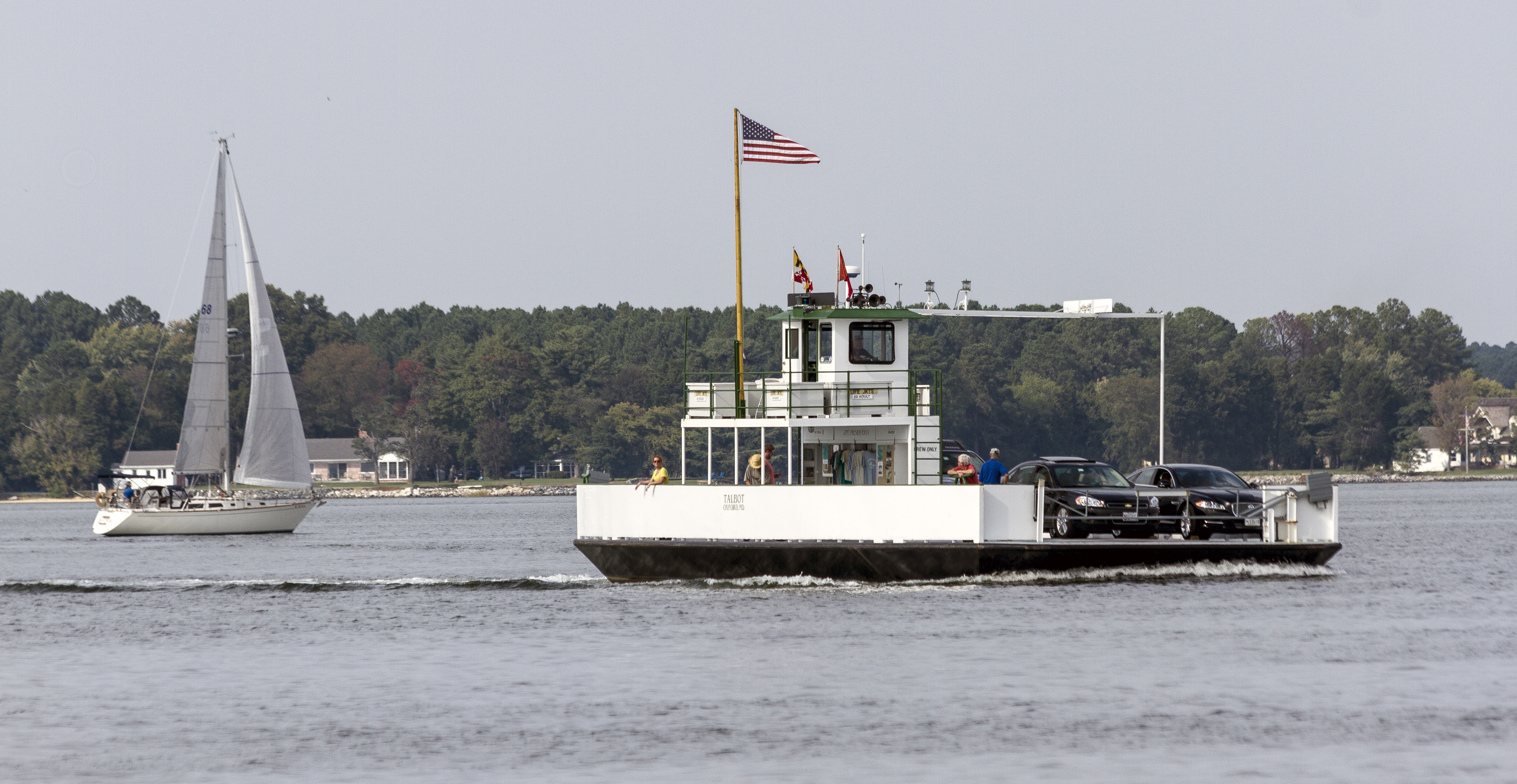
Oxford-Bellevue Ferry

With the colonial port of Oxford founded near its mouth between 1666 and 1668, the river served as a major shipping lane in the international tobacco trade until the end of the American Revolutionary War, when wheat became the Eastern Shore's main cash crop and Oxford's monopoly on colonial trade ended, leading to an economic downturn. With the decline in trade came a post-Civil War rise in oyster harvesting, causing a renewed local economic boom lasting until the depletion of oyster beds in the Tred Avon and lower Choptank in the 1920s from overharvesting.

Maryland governor Martin O'Malley sought to revive the river's oyster beds through citizen participation by initiating the "Marylanders Grow Oysters" project in September 2008, which encourages waterfront property owners to grow oysters from their piers using cages; after a 9- to 12-month growing period, the oysters are moved to a protected sanctuary in the Tred Avon.

The Oxford–Bellevue Ferry, believed to be the oldest privately operated ferry service in the United States, offers shuttle service across the river from April to November.

== See also ==
- Chesapeake Bay
- List of Maryland rivers
