= Newcomb, Maryland =

Unincorporated community in Maryland, United States

- Unincorporated community
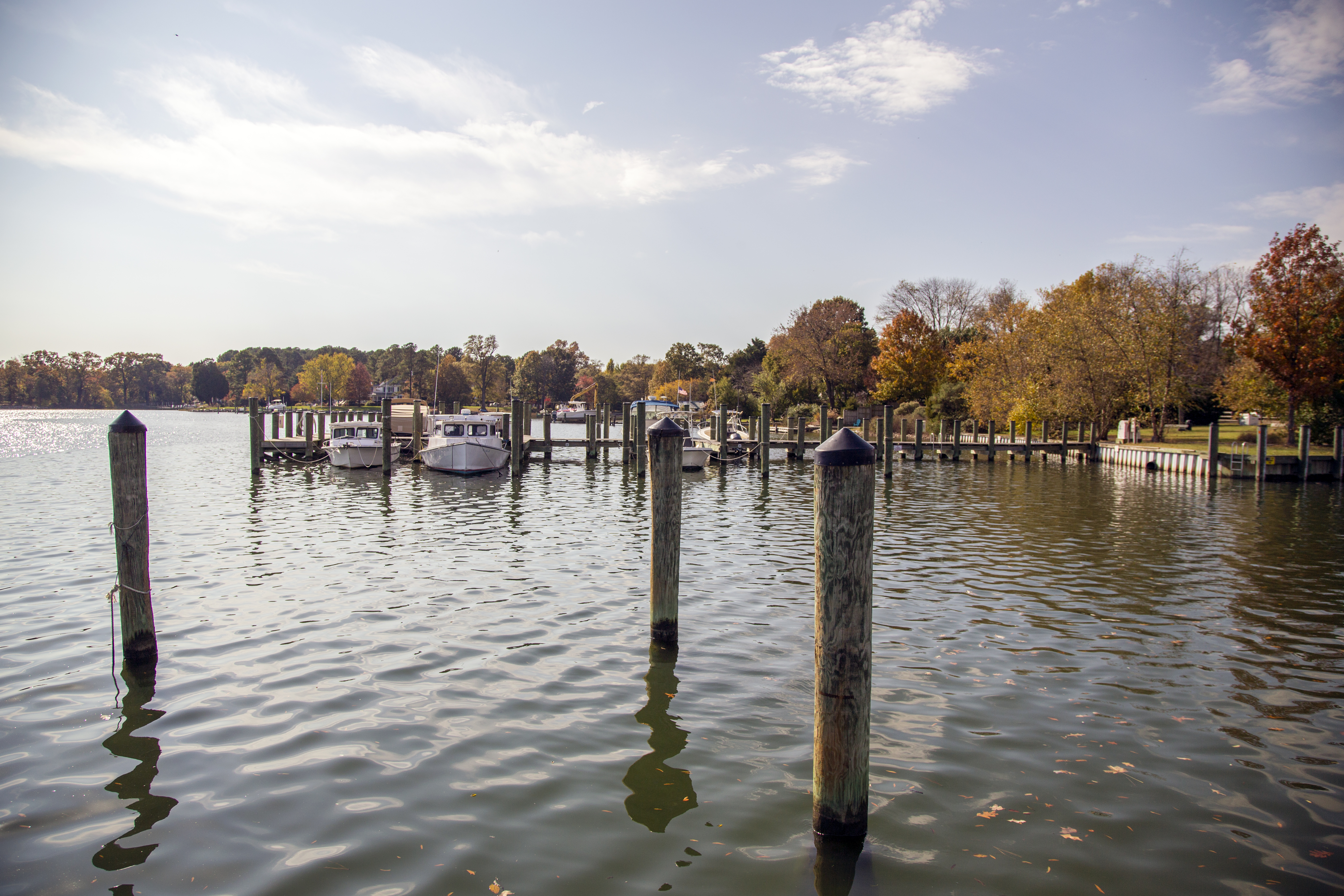
- Oak Creek and the Newcomb waterfront in 2017

- Location within Maryland
- Coordinates: 38°45′13″N 76°10′34″W
- Country: United States
- State: Maryland
- County: Talbot
- Elevation: 7 ft (2.1 m)
- Time zone: UTC-5 (Eastern (EST))
  - Summer (DST): UTC-4 (EDT)
- ZIP code: 21653
- Area codes: 410, 443, and 667
- GNIS feature ID: 590879

Newcomb is an unincorporated community in Talbot County, Maryland, United States. Newcomb is located along Maryland Route 33 on the south bank of the Miles River, southeast of St. Michaels. It is located near a tract of land, which was once owned by Talbot County planter Robert Newcome (d. 1790).
