= Miles River =

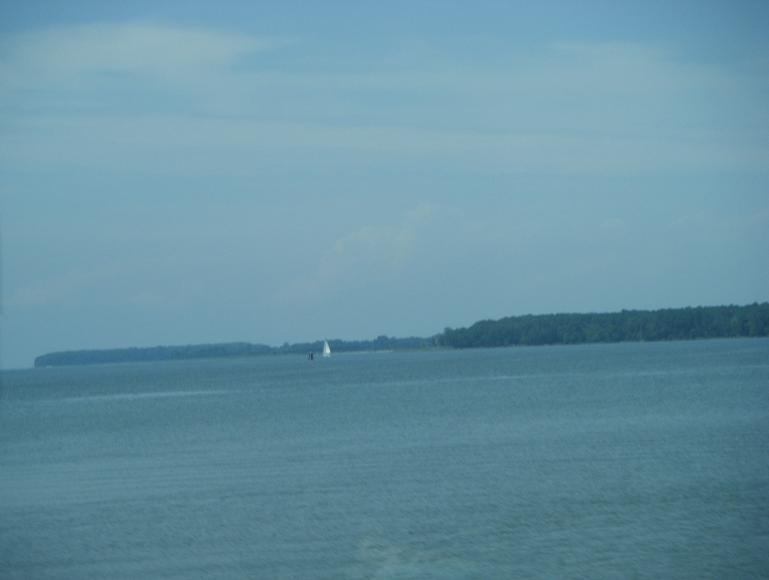
- Miles River at Newcomb in June 2008.
- Etymology: Saint Michael

Location
- Country: United States of America
- State: Maryland
- Region: Talbot County
- Municipality: Newcomb

Physical characteristics
- Length: 12.9 mi (20.8 km)
- Basin size: 54 mi^{2} (140 km^{2})

The Miles River is a 12.9-mile-long (20.8 km) tidal river in Talbot County, Maryland. It is a tributary of the Eastern Bay and is thus part of the Chesapeake Bay watershed.

== Etymology ==
Miles River was originally called the St. Michaels River; it derives its name from Saint Michael, the patron saint of Colonial Maryland.

== Geography ==
Its watershed area is 54 square miles (140 km^{2}), of which 12 square miles (31 km^{2}) is open water, so it is 22% water. The predominant land use is agricultural with 22 square miles (57 km^{2}), or 52% of the land area.
