= Talbot County, Maryland =

County in Maryland, United States

- County
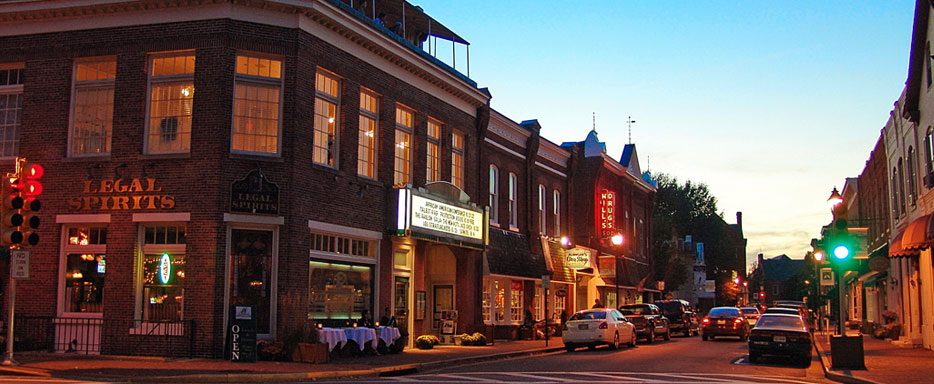
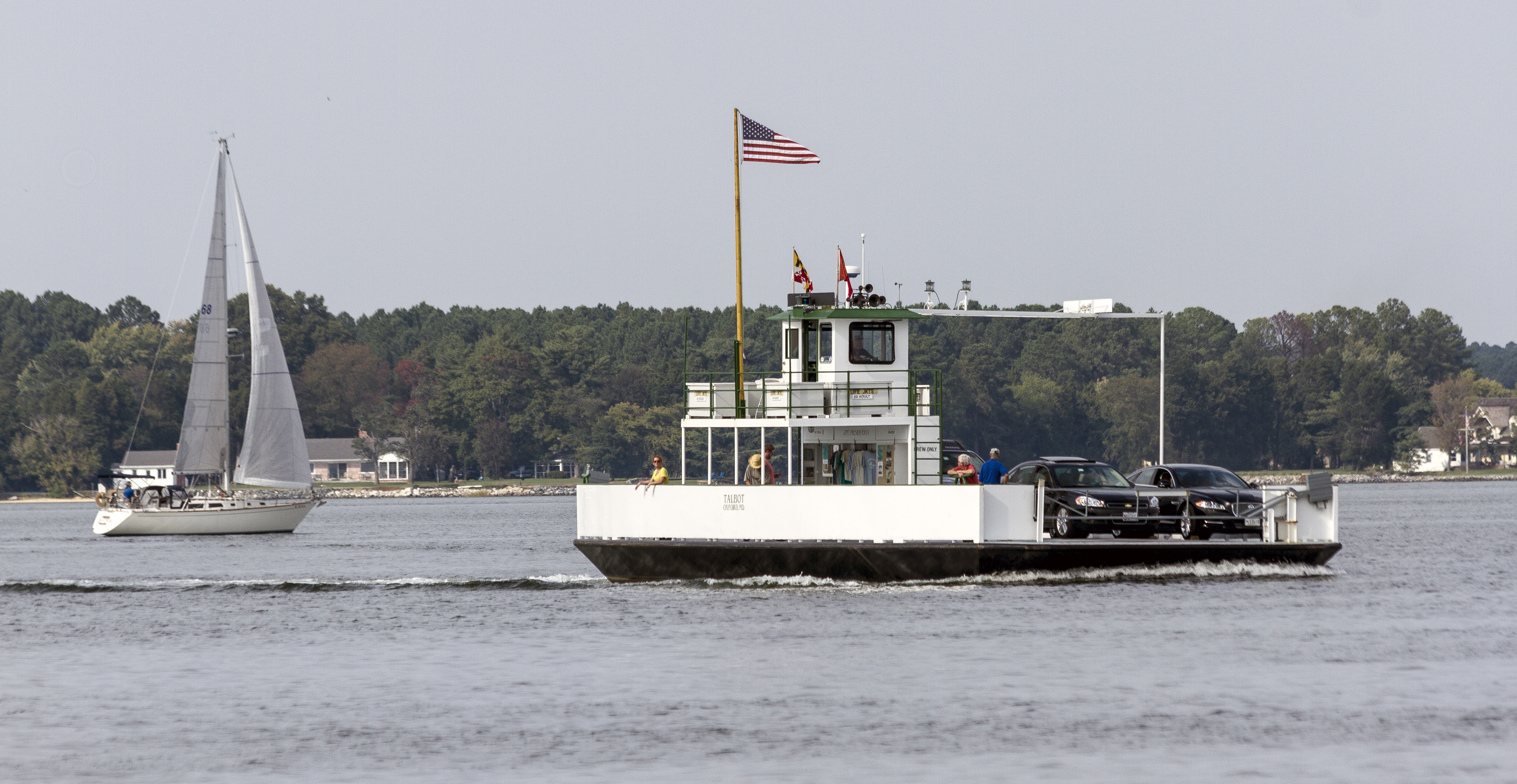
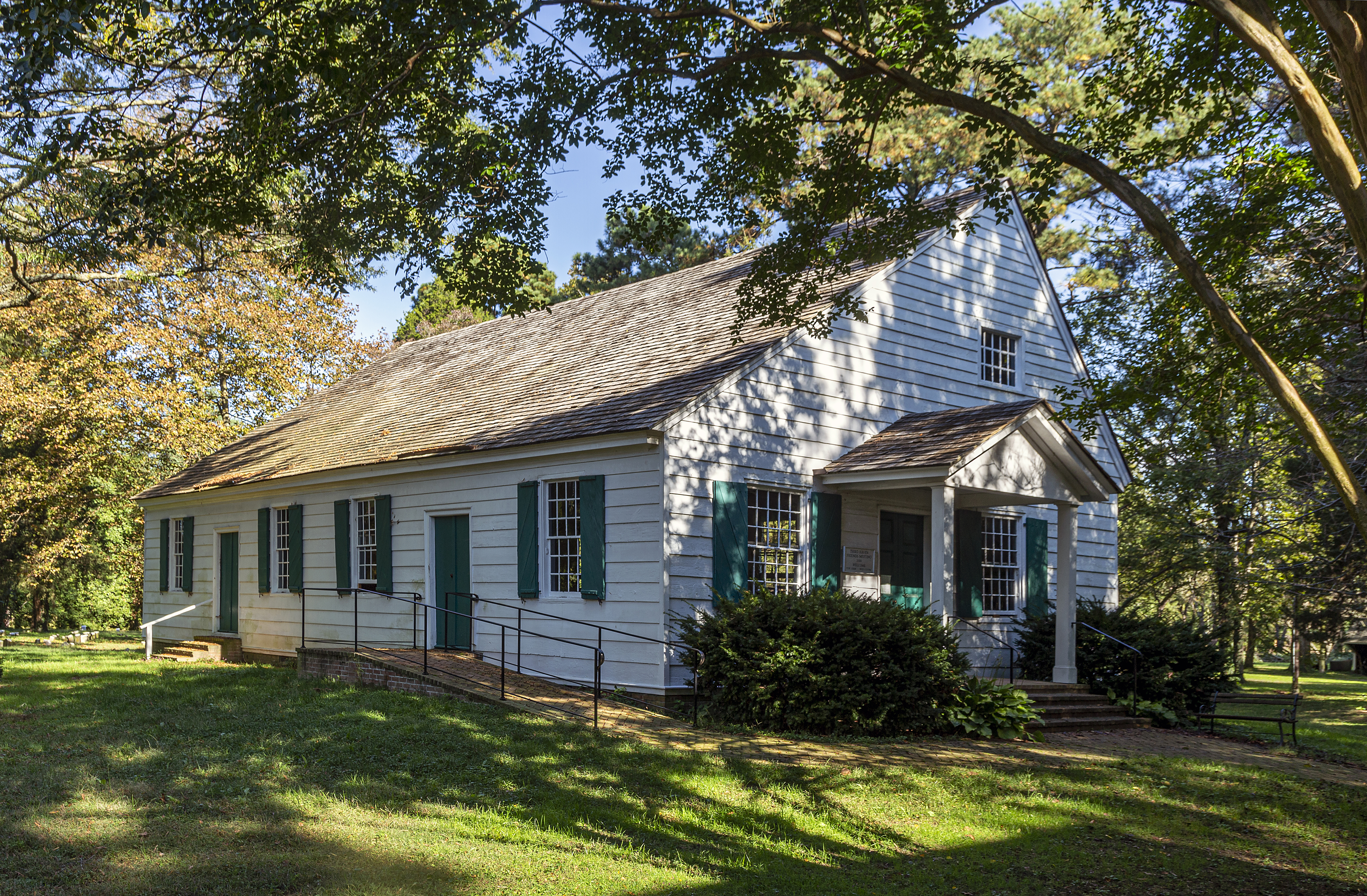
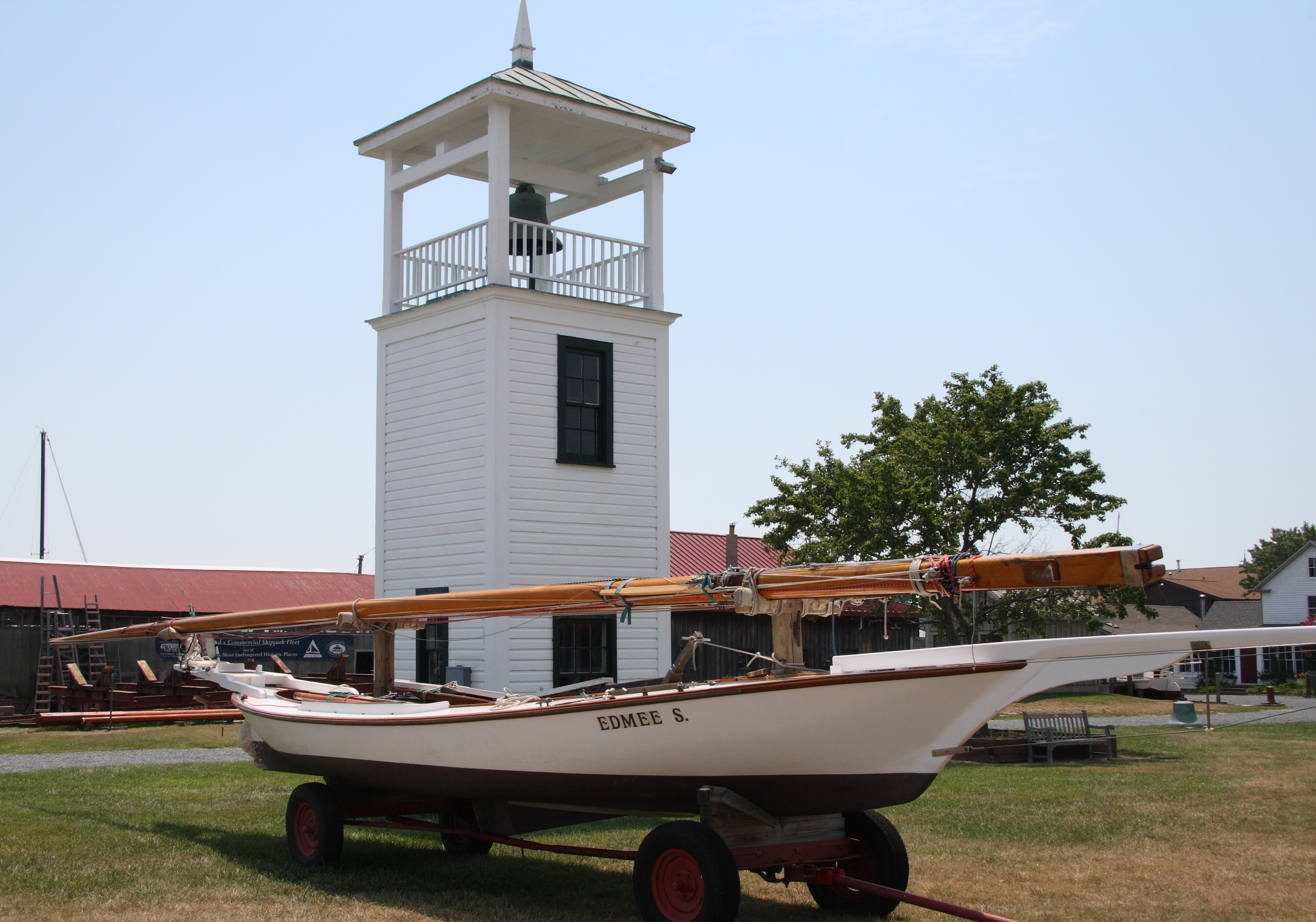
- Clockwise: Downtown Easton, Oxford-Bellevue Ferry, Chesapeake Bay Maritime Museum, Third Haven Meeting House.

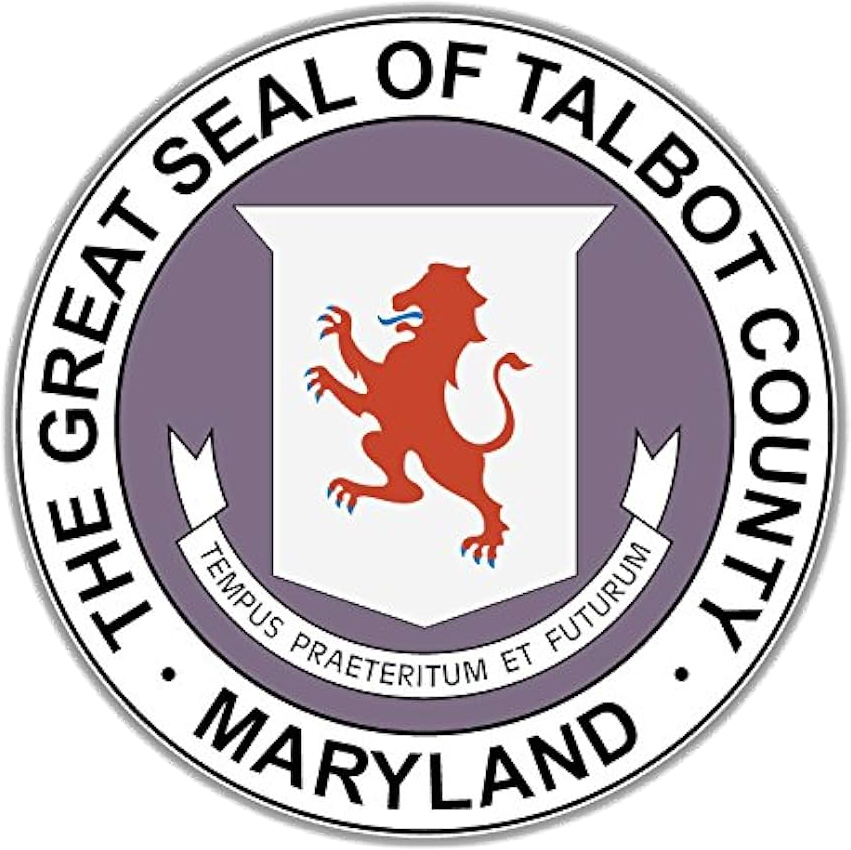
- Flag Seal
- Motto(s): Tempus Praeteritum et Futurum (Latin for "Times, Past and Future")
- Location within the U.S. state of Maryland
- Coordinates: 38°45′N 76°11′W
- Country: United States
- State: Maryland
- Founded: c. 1661
- Named for: Grace Talbot
- Seat: Easton
- Largest town: Easton

Area
  - Total: 477 sq mi (1,240 km^{2})
  - Land: 269 sq mi (700 km^{2})
  - Water: 208 sq mi (540 km^{2}) 44%

Population (2020)
  - Total: 37,526
  - Estimate (2025): 38,238 ▲
  - Density: 140/sq mi (53.9/km^{2})
- Time zone: UTC−5 (Eastern)
  - Summer (DST): UTC−4 (EDT)
- Congressional district: 1st
- Website: talbotcountymd.gov

Talbot County is a county located in the U.S. state of Maryland. As of the 2020 census, the population was 37,526. Its county seat is Easton. The county was named for Lady Grace Talbot, the wife of Sir Robert Talbot, an Anglo-Irish statesman, and the sister of Lord Baltimore.

Talbot County comprises the Easton, MD Micropolitan Statistical Area, which is also included in the Washington–Baltimore–Arlington, DC–MD–VA–WV–PA Combined Statistical Area.

Talbot County is bordered by Queen Anne's County to the north, Caroline County to the east, Dorchester County to the south, and the Chesapeake Bay to the west.

== History ==
=== 17th century ===
The founding date of Talbot County is not known. It existed by February 12, 1661, when a writ was issued to its sheriff. It was initially divided into nine hundreds and three parishes: St. Paul's, St. Peter's and St. Michael's.

In 1667, the first Meeting of Commissions was held in a home on the Skipton Creek near the town of York. The town of York was vacated once the courthouse was planned to be built on Armstrongs Old Field in 1709 near Pitts' Bridge. The new courthouse designated because York was too far north in the county once Queen Anne's County received their charter and was lopped off of Talbot County. Pitts' Bridge was just north of the Quaker Meeting House, but most importantly, it faced the Indian trail (Washington Street – Easton).

=== 18th century ===
Founding Father John Dickinson was born in Trappe in 1732.

Lt. Col. Tench Tilghman, Gen. George Washington's aide-de-camp, was born on Fausley in Talbot County on December 25, 1744. He died on April 18, 1786, and is buried in Oxford, Maryland.

After the American Revolutionary War in 1786, Act to Assemble in Annapolis appointed John Needles to survey and "to erect a town in Talbot County to be called Talbottown"—laying out a town around then existing court house with 118 number parcels of land and designated streets, alleys and lanes. Talbottown was to be known as the county seat of Easton. Another act was passed in 1789 to build a larger courthouse on the site of the old one. This court house was completed in 1794 and today parts of it still stand today inside of the present court house.

=== 19th century ===
The abolitionist Frederick Douglass was born into slavery near Tuckahoe Creek around 1817 or 1818.

In 1869, one of the only Mammoths found in Maryland was discovered in the County.

By the mid-1880s, two all-black settlements, Unionville and Copperville, had been established along the Miles River neck.

=== 20th century ===
The first established hospital on the Eastern Shore was near McDaniel at Dr. Absolom Thompson farm, the old Mary's Delight Farm.

In 1962, a CIA safehouse along St. Michaels Road housed Francis Gary Powers when the Soviets released him after he was shot down over the Soviet Union. The house was sold by the government in 1983 and 1989 and is now private property.

The county has a number of properties on the National Register of Historic Places.

=== Great Seal symbology ===
The Great Seal of Talbot County was adopted on July 26, 1966. The design reflects the Talbot coat of arms, chosen due to the county's namesake, Grace Talbot, daughter of George Calvert, 1st Baron Baltimore. The seal features a rampant lion gules on a silver shield. Its background is purpure, a color assigned to Talbot County in 1694 by Maryland's royal governor, Sir Francis Nicholson. It bears the inscription, "The Great Seal of Talbot County Maryland" along the edge. Below the lion is the Latin motto, Tempus Praeteritum Et Futurum, meaning "Times, Past and Future."

== Historical sites and monuments ==
=== Third Haven Meeting House ===
The Third Haven Meeting House of Society of Friends was built in 1682 by Quakers. After Charles I was executed in England in 1649, then Virginia governor Berkley, who sympathized with the Royalists, drove Quakers out of Virginia for their religious beliefs. Lord Baltimore invited the refugees to Maryland Province to settle, and passed the Toleration Act. John Edmondson gave the Quakers land on which to settle near the Tred Avon River in what later became Easton, Maryland. The Meeting House sits on high ground surrounded by 3 wooded acres and is positioned along the Indian Trail (today known as Washington Street). George Fox, father of the Quaker movement visited several times. Upon his death, Third Haven Meeting House received his personal library and collection. The Third Haven Meeting House may be the oldest framed building for religious meeting in The United States. According to tradition, Lord Baltimore attended a sermon given there by William Penn.

In 1794, the rafters were extended on one side of the ridgepole. While this extension made more room inside the meeting house, it also made the building look lopsided. In 1879, a new Third Haven Meeting House was constructed out of brick, and still remains in use today. The ground floor now contains meeting rooms, and Sunday School is held on the second floor.

=== St. Joseph Roman Catholic Church ===
St. Joseph Roman Catholic Church, which still holds weekly masses, is recognized as the oldest Roman Catholic Church on the Eastern Shore of Maryland. Father Joseph Mosely, a Jesuit, established the church in 1765 on a farm north of Easton in Cordova. St. Joseph Church was the second Catholic Church in Talbot County; a chapel at Doncaster was the first.

The church had additions built in 1845 and in 1903 (the cloverleaf apse at the left where the altar is now). Father Mosley and other priests are buried under the church floor.

St. Joseph Church hosts an annual jousting tournament on the first Wednesday of August. The event has been held at St. Joseph for the past 142 years. The only time the event was canceled was in 1918, due to many of the riders' involvement in World War I.

=== Longwoods School House ===
Longwoods School House or The Little Red School House is located on Longwoods Road (Route 662) just north of Easton. Longwoods School House is one of the few remaining one-room schoolhouses on the Eastern Shore. The school opened in 1865 with an average class size of about 30, and held its last class in 1967. It once had two outhouses: one for the boys and one for the girls, separated by a fence. Indoor plumbing was introduced in 1957 and electricity in 1936.

The Talbot Historical Society restored the schoolhouse to it original form, removing the electrical lights and the modern plumbing and added the outhouse to the back of the building.

=== Poplar Island ===
Poplar Island

Popeley Island (later Poplar Island) was one of Talbot County's first islands that was given a name and location on a map. Popeley Island was given its name by Captain William Claibourne after Lt. Richard Popeley. Popeley Island was the first land to be settled in 1632 by Captain William Claibourne. The first fields were planted in Talbot County on Popeley Island in 1634, and in 1635 Claibourne granted the whole island to his cousin Richard Thompson. During the summer of 1637, while Thompson was off the island on an expedition, Native Americans, the Nanticoke tribe, massacred Thompson's whole family and workers. Through the 1700s the name changed spelling from Popeleys to Poples to Poplar. Thompson went back to Virginia and never came back to his island. In 1654 Thomas Hawkins acquired Poplar Island and sold half to Seth Foster, Tilghman Island’s founding father. Poplar Island is only accessible by boat today and is currently being rebuilt by the Army Corps of Engineers.

=== White Marsh Church ===
In 1691, King William and Queen Mary appointed Sir Lionel Copely as the first royal governor and told him that the colonists needed to become more religious. The Establishment Act of 1692 divided Talbot County into three parishes to serve the Church of England, and Old White Marsh was one of them. The location of the church was to be in Hambleton, with the decision based upon the trade routine of the time. It was between the two ports in Oxford and Dover (small town on the Choptank near where Dover Bridge today sits). The original church is believed to have been built between 1662 and 1665; however, the first mention of the church is in 1690, although the Talbot County Court House has a record of repair made to the road to Old White Marsh Church in 1687.

In 1751, repairs were made to the church, and it was doubled in size due to the fact the membership was so large. Reverend Thomas Bacon was the cause of the large membership. Reverend Bacon was the writer of the Bacon's Laws. Membership decreased when Reverend Bacon left to assume leadership of Maryland's largest parish (at that time), All Saints Church in Frederick, Maryland, and services alternated between White Marsh and the new Christ Church in the growing county seat of Easton. Services finally ended at White Marsh, and the church was abandoned after it burned in brush fire during a cleanup operation in 1897. A few of the original items used at the church rest at the St. Paul's Church in Trappe: White Marsh's Bible, communion items and the old wooden alms box. The remaining brick wall can still be seen from U.S. Route 50 between Trappe and Easton.

The first rector, Reverend Daniel Maynadier, and his wife are buried in the floor of the church. Robert Morris Sr., merchant and father of founding father Robert Morris, is buried just outside the church to the left. Plaques show the graves of all three individuals.

=== Talbot Boys monument ===
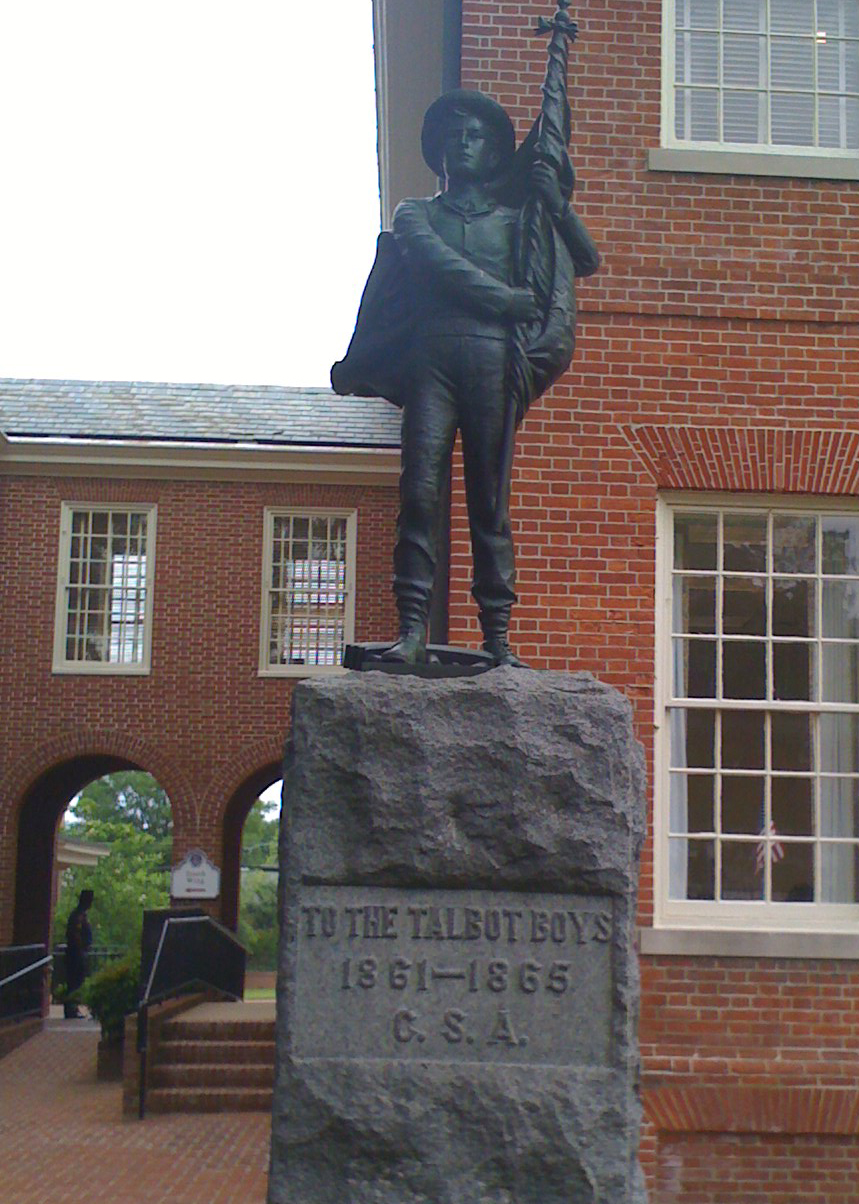
The "Talbot Boys" confederate monument outside the county courthouse

From 1916 to 2022, a statue honoring the Talbot County men who fought in the Confederate States Army in the American Civil War stood in front of the Talbot County Courthouse. The statue depicted a young boy holding and wrapped in a Confederate flag, and bears the inscription: "To the Talbot Boys · 1861–1865 · C.S.A.". Talbot County also had over 300 Union soldiers in the war, but there has never been a monument to them.

Like other Confederate monuments installed during the Jim Crow era, the monument drew increased opposition in the 21st century by those opposed to honoring the Confederacy and its defense of slavery. In 2015, the local N.A.A.C.P. chapter proposed removing the statue, but the County Council unanimously voted to keep it in place. In June 2020, a lengthy series of letters to the editor of The Talbot Spy, a local newspaper, was published, all arguing for the removal of the statue. In August 2020, after the George Floyd protests led to a new wave of removals of Confederate monuments, the County Council voted down 3:2 a resolution to remove the statue, triggering loud public protests.

By 2021, the statue was the only remaining Confederate statue on public grounds in Maryland. In May 2021, the ACLU sued the county in federal court to demand its removal. In September 2021, the County Council voted 3:2 to remove the statue. It was removed on March 14, 2022, and relocated to the Cross Keys battlefield in Harrisonburg, Virginia, under the control of the nonprofit Shenandoah Valley Battlefields Foundation.

=== Frederick Douglass monument ===
Near the Talbot Boys monument, a statue of the abolitionist Frederick Douglass, born into slavery near Tuckahoe Creek, stands in front of the courthouse. Douglass had been held in jail at the rear of the courthouse after his aborted attempt to escape slavery on April 2, 1836.

The Douglass statue was proposed by the Talbot Historical Society in 2002. The County Council approved it in 2004, after some local opposition, with a majority of one vote. It did so on the condition that its height not exceed that of the Talbot Boys monument.

=== Old Wye Church ===
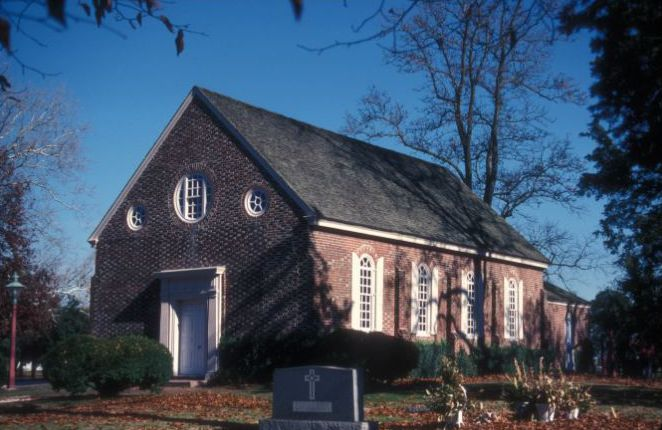
Old Wye Episcopal Church

A chapel of ease near the Wye River was likely built soon after the creation of Saint Paul's Parish in Centreville by the act of establishment of 1692. The present brick church of Georgian design was built between 1717 and 1721 by William Elbert. Altered in the mid-nineteenth century, the chapel was restored in Georgian Revival style in 1947–49 by the firm Perry, Shaw, and Hepburn (who also directed much of the early restoration of Colonial Williamsburg). The church is actively used today, one of two churches in Wye Parish. Old Wye Church (or Saint Luke's Church) is the oldest surviving brick church in Talbot County.

== Economy ==
Talbot County is an important tourism hub with a historic, evolving maritime economy. It is the epicenter for financial services in the Eastern Shore region, with the fourth-largest bank in the state, Shore United Bank, headquartered in Easton. In 2028, the University of Maryland Shore Regional Health Center will open in Easton, making the county a regional healthcare hub.

=== Cap on tax revenue ===
Talbot County offers the lowest real property tax rate in the state, the second lowest income tax rate, and no taxes on corporate income, sales, or business personal property.

In 1978, county residents approved a ballot measure to implement a property tax revenue cap. This system which makes it extremely difficult to raise sufficient funds for certain initiatives, including key public safety projects and public schools. This has led to several local ballot measures in recent years.

In 1995, the Talbot County Board of Education filed a lawsuit challenging the property tax limit, citing an "ethical and moral responsibility to provide the highest quality of education for our students." The court sided with the school and overturned the limit, ruling that it violated the state constitution by effectively usurping the power of elected officials to set tax rates.

In 1996, Talbot County voters approved a ballot measure to place a cap on income and property taxes.

Since 2012, Talbot has exceeded the charter limitations on local property taxes to fund the approved budget of the local boards of education.

In 2018, Talbot County proposed temporarily overriding the property tax cap to raise $1.1 million in non-recurring education funds. Voters rejected the amendment.

In 2020, Talbot County voters amended a charter to temporarily raise residents' property taxes to fund public safety measures, with 59.5% in favor.

In 2024, Talbot County voters amended the charter to extend the temporary increase from 2020, with 50.93% in favor.

== Politics and government ==
Talbot County was granted a charter form of government in 1973. The Talbot County Council has five members elected to four-year terms. The council president and vice president are elected yearly. As of 2022 the current council president is Chuck Callahan (R), and the County Manager is Clay B. Stamp. The current sheriff is Joe Gamble.

In the years following the Civil War, Talbot was a swing county, divided between Unionists and Secessionists. Although it voted Democratic at every election between 1908 and 1924, it later took decisive steps towards the Republican Party. It surpassed Garrett County as the state's most Republican county in 1976. Barack Obama came within ten percentage points of reclaiming the county in 2008.

In 2020, Joe Biden became the first Democratic presidential nominee to carry Talbot County since Lyndon Johnson's 1964 landslide and the second since Franklin Roosevelt in 1936. In the 2022 Maryland elections, Democratic governor Wes Moore and Democratic U.S. Senator Chris Van Hollen also carried Talbot county while winning statewide. In 2024, Republican Donald Trump flipped back Talbot County, winning it by just 6 votes, the closest county in the whole nation.

United States presidential election results for Talbot County, Maryland
Year	Republican		Democratic		Third party(ies)	
Year	No.	%	No.	%	No.	%
1836	656	57.80%	479	42.20%	0	0.00%
1840	749	52.34%	682	47.66%	0	0.00%
1844	795	52.75%	712	47.25%	0	0.00%
1848	706	49.51%	719	50.42%	1	0.07%
1852	740	48.18%	796	51.82%	0	0.00%
1856	0	0.00%	910	54.85%	749	45.15%
1860	2	0.11%	98	5.47%	1,691	94.42%
1864	578	68.40%	267	31.60%	0	0.00%
1868	357	22.19%	1,252	77.81%	0	0.00%
1872	1,663	52.23%	1,521	47.77%	0	0.00%
1876	1,808	49.94%	1,812	50.06%	0	0.00%
1880	1,988	48.07%	2,148	51.93%	0	0.00%
1884	2,207	49.46%	2,214	49.62%	41	0.92%
1888	2,282	50.60%	2,120	47.01%	108	2.39%
1892	2,137	49.76%	1,974	45.96%	184	4.28%
1896	2,542	51.50%	2,189	44.35%	205	4.15%
1900	2,573	51.70%	2,233	44.87%	171	3.44%
1904	1,999	50.53%	1,861	47.04%	96	2.43%
1908	1,908	47.30%	2,025	50.20%	101	2.50%
1912	1,835	45.81%	1,888	47.13%	283	7.06%
1916	1,753	42.85%	2,180	53.29%	158	3.86%
1920	3,050	49.19%	3,130	50.48%	20	0.32%
1924	2,451	44.66%	2,859	52.10%	178	3.24%
1928	3,990	61.93%	2,432	37.75%	21	0.33%
1932	2,672	38.45%	4,233	60.91%	45	0.65%
1936	3,578	48.58%	3,768	51.16%	19	0.26%
1940	4,368	53.89%	3,689	45.51%	49	0.60%
1944	3,712	57.28%	2,768	42.72%	0	0.00%
1948	3,585	59.95%	2,344	39.20%	51	0.85%
1952	5,357	63.81%	3,019	35.96%	19	0.23%
1956	6,018	68.75%	2,735	31.25%	0	0.00%
1960	4,995	59.06%	3,462	40.94%	0	0.00%
1964	3,693	44.15%	4,671	55.85%	0	0.00%
1968	4,902	55.18%	2,609	29.37%	1,372	15.45%
1972	6,620	74.73%	2,181	24.62%	58	0.65%
1976	5,848	61.15%	3,715	38.85%	0	0.00%
1980	6,044	56.43%	3,995	37.30%	672	6.27%
1984	8,028	71.32%	3,198	28.41%	30	0.27%
1988	8,170	66.97%	3,948	32.36%	81	0.66%
1992	6,774	49.42%	4,642	33.86%	2,292	16.72%
1996	6,997	54.43%	4,821	37.50%	1,037	8.07%
2000	8,874	58.25%	5,854	38.43%	506	3.32%
2004	11,288	59.84%	7,367	39.05%	209	1.11%
2008	10,995	54.09%	9,035	44.45%	298	1.47%
2012	11,339	55.42%	8,808	43.05%	312	1.53%
2016	10,724	52.18%	8,653	42.10%	1,176	5.72%
2020	10,946	48.53%	11,062	49.04%	547	2.43%
2024	11,125	48.73%	11,119	48.70%	586	2.57%

=== Voter registration ===
Voter registration and party enrollment as of March 2024
Republican	11,631	40.58%
Democratic	10,543	36.79%
Unaffiliated	6,049	21.11%
Libertarian	160	0.56%
Other parties	277	0.97%
Total	28,660	100%

== Geography ==
According to the U.S. Census Bureau, the county has a total area of 477 square miles (1,240 km^{2}), of which 269 square miles (700 km^{2}) is land and 208 square miles (540 km^{2}) (44%) is water. It is the third-smallest county in Maryland by land area.

=== Adjacent counties ===
- Queen Anne's County (north)
- Dorchester County (south)
- Calvert County (southwest)
- Caroline County (east)
- Anne Arundel County (west)

=== Major highways ===
U.S. Route 50 is the largest highway serving Talbot County.

=== Rivers and creeks ===
The Choptank River takes its name from a tribe of Algonquian-speaking Indians who inhabited both shores of this stream before its settlement by the English.

Talbot County's Miles River was originally named St. Michael's River. In colonial times all grants of land from the Lords Baltimore were in the shape of leases subject to small and nominal ground rents, reserved by the Proprietary, and payable annually at Michaelmas, the Feast of St. Michael and All Angels. In the calendar of the Roman Catholic and Anglican churches this is observed on September 29. Because of this association, St. Michael was considered to be the patron saint of colonial Maryland, and as such was honored by the river being named for him. A large colony of Quakers were among the earliest settlers in Talbot County; as they had no reverence for saints, they persisted in dropping the word saint and calling the river Michaels River. It gradually became known as Miles.

As early as 1667, six years after the laying out of Talbot County, references to these names are found in the Proceedings of the Provincial Council of Maryland. A commission was issued by Charles Calvert, Esq., Captain General of all the forces within the province of Maryland, to George Richard as captain of 10 troops of horse to march out of "Choptanck and St. Miles rivers in Talbot County, aforesaid upon any expedition against any Indian enemy whatsoever," etc. At the same time, a similar commission was issued to Hopkin Davis, as Captain of foot in Choptanck and St. Miles rivers.

Wye River, which forms the northern boundary of Talbot County, was named by Edward Lloyd, a Welsh immigrant who took up large tracts of land along its southern shores before the laying out of Talbot County. He named it for the River Wye, noted for its sinuosity, whose source is near that of the River Severn, near a mountain in Wales. He named his homestead Wye House, which was owned by nine generations of Lloyds.

Tred Avon River is a corruption of "Third Haven", as the Third Haven Meeting House was built at the river's headwaters in 1682. "Third Haven" may be a corruption of "Thread Haven", an early name for the first port established at what is now Oxford, Maryland

Of the thirteen Eastons in England, the most important town of that name is situated about one mile (1.6 km) from the head of the Lower Avon. The seat of Talbot County, located one mile (1.6 km) from the headwaters of Tred Avon River, changed its name from Talbot Court House to Easton in 1788 following the American Revolutionary War, as a reference to the English town. In colonial days, many merchant vessels traded between Oxford and Bristol, England, near which Easton is located. Many of the early settlers of Talbot County emigrated from this area.

== Demographics ==
Historical population
Census	Pop.	Note	%±
1790	13,084		—
1800	13,436		2.7%
1810	14,230		5.9%
1820	14,389		1.1%
1830	12,947		−10.0%
1840	12,090		−6.6%
1850	13,811		14.2%
1860	14,795		7.1%
1870	16,137		9.1%
1880	19,065		18.1%
1890	19,736		3.5%
1900	20,342		3.1%
1910	19,620		−3.5%
1920	18,306		−6.7%
1930	18,583		1.5%
1940	18,784		1.1%
1950	19,428		3.4%
1960	21,578		11.1%
1970	23,682		9.8%
1980	25,604		8.1%
1990	30,549		19.3%
2000	33,812		10.7%
2010	37,782		11.7%
2020	37,526		−0.7%
2025 (est.)	38,238	▲	1.9%
U.S. Decennial Census; 1790-1960 1900–1990; 1990-2000 2010–2018

=== Racial and ethnic composition ===
Talbot County, Maryland – Racial and ethnic composition Note: the US Census treats Hispanic/Latino as an ethnic category. This table excludes Latinos from the racial categories and assigns them to a separate category. Hispanics/Latinos may be of any race.
Race / Ethnicity (NH = Non-Hispanic)	Pop 1980	Pop 1990	Pop 2000	Pop 2010	Pop 2020	% 1980	% 1990	% 2000	% 2010	% 2020
White alone (NH)	20,003	24,754	27,456	29,829	28,065	78.12%	81.03%	81.20%	78.95%	74.79%
Black or African American alone (NH)	5,398	5,468	5,161	4,778	4,186	21.08%	17.90%	15.26%	12.65%	11.15%
Native American or Alaska Native alone (NH)	11	42	54	48	45	0.04%	0.14%	0.16%	0.13%	0.12%
Asian alone (NH)	52	91	269	463	536	0.20%	0.30%	0.80%	1.23%	1.43%
Native Hawaiian or Pacific Islander alone (NH)	x	x	7	16	11	x	x	0.02%	0.04%	0.03%
Other race alone (NH)	7	27	25	69	162	0.03%	0.09%	0.07%	0.18%	0.43%
Mixed race or Multiracial (NH)	x	x	225	506	1,169	x	x	0.67%	1.34%	3.12%
Hispanic or Latino (any race)	133	167	615	2,073	3,352	0.52%	0.55%	1.82%	5.49%	8.93%
Total	25,604	30,549	33,812	37,782	37,526	100.00%	100.00%	100.00%	100.00%	100.00%

=== 2020 census ===
As of the 2020 census, the county had a population of 37,526. The median age was 50.7 years. 18.2% of residents were under the age of 18 and 29.5% of residents were 65 years of age or older. For every 100 females there were 90.9 males, and for every 100 females age 18 and over there were 88.1 males age 18 and over. 48.1% of residents lived in urban areas, while 51.9% lived in rural areas.

The racial makeup of the county was 75.8% White, 11.3% Black or African American, 0.4% American Indian and Alaska Native, 1.4% Asian, 0.0% Native Hawaiian and Pacific Islander, 5.1% from some other race, and 6.0% from two or more races. Hispanic or Latino residents of any race comprised 8.9% of the population.

There were 16,296 households in the county, of which 23.9% had children under the age of 18 living with them and 29.3% had a female householder with no spouse or partner present. About 30.6% of all households were made up of individuals and 17.9% had someone living alone who was 65 years of age or older.

There were 19,538 housing units, of which 16.6% were vacant. Among occupied housing units, 71.2% were owner-occupied and 28.8% were renter-occupied. The homeowner vacancy rate was 2.1% and the rental vacancy rate was 6.7%.

=== 2010 census ===
As of the 2010 United States census, there were 37,782 people, 16,157 households, and 10,699 families residing in the county. The population density was 140.7 inhabitants per square mile (54.3/km^{2}). There were 19,577 housing units at an average density of 72.9 per square mile (28.1/km^{2}). The racial makeup of the county was 81.4% white, 12.8% black or African American, 1.2% Asian, 0.2% American Indian, 0.1% Pacific islander, 2.7% from other races, and 1.6% from two or more races. Those of Hispanic or Latino origin made up 5.5% of the population. In terms of ancestry, 21.7% were German, 18.8% were English, 18.2% were Irish, and 8.6% were American.

Of the 16,157 households, 25.7% had children under the age of 18 living with them, 52.2% were married couples living together, 10.1% had a female householder with no husband present, 33.8% were non-families, and 28.3% of all households were made up of individuals. The average household size was 2.31 and the average family size was 2.80. The median age was 47.4 years.

The median income for a household in the county was $63,017 and the median income for a family was $76,007. Males had a median income of $48,387 versus $38,627 for females. The per capita income for the county was $37,958. About 4.3% of families and 6.1% of the population were below the poverty line, including 8.7% of those under age 18 and 4.9% of those age 65 or over.

=== 2000 census ===
As of the census of 2000, there were 33,812 people, 14,307 households, and 9,628 families residing in the county. The population density was 126 people per square mile (49 people/km^{2}). There were 16,500 housing units at an average density of 61 per square mile (24/km^{2}). People self-identified as to racial or ethnic ancestry by the following: 81.98% White, 15.36% Black or African American, 0.18% Native American, 0.80% Asian, 0.13% Pacific Islander, 0.77% from other races, and 0.78% from two or more races. 1.82% of the population were Hispanic or Latino of any race. Of those who identified as white, 18.2% were of English, 15.5% German, 11.3% Irish and 11.1% American ancestry.

There were 14,307 households, out of which 26.40% had children under the age of 18 living with them, 54.40% were married couples living together, 9.80% had a female householder with no husband present, and 32.70% were non-families. 27.80% of all households were made up of individuals, and 13.00% had someone living alone who was 65 years of age or older. The average household size was 2.32 and the average family size was 2.82.

In the county, the population was spread out, with 21.70% under the age of 18, 5.60% from 18 to 24, 25.20% from 25 to 44, 27.20% from 45 to 64, and 20.40% who were 65 years of age or older. The median age was 43 years. For every 100 females there were 91.20 males. For every 100 females age 18 and over, there were 87.60 males.

The median income for a household in the county was $43,532, and the median income for a family was $53,214. Males had a median income of $33,757 versus $26,871 for females. The per capita income for the county was $28,164. About 5.30% of families and 8.30% of the population were below the poverty line, including 10.50% of those under age 18 and 7.90% of those age 65 or over.

== Education ==
Public schools are part of the Talbot County Public Schools district, which covers all of the county.

There are also several private schools within the county.

== Events ==
- Waterfowl Festival
- Talbot County Fair – Talbot County held the 1st Agricultural Fair in the State of Maryland in Easton in 1822.
- Tuckahoe Steam and Gas Association – Annual Steam Show – 1st Saturday after July 4
- Plein Air Easton - Held in July, Plein Air Easton is the largest juried plein air painting competition in the United States. In 2024, it celebrates its 20th year.

== Media ==
The newspaper of record is The Star Democrat. The county is located in Baltimore's designated market area, but Salisbury, Maryland and Washington, D.C. stations are also sometimes available.

In 2022, WHCP (91.7 FM) won a broadcast license from the FCC to expand from a low-power station reaching 10 miles around Cambridge to a larger reach including most of Talbot and other counties in the mid-shore area.

== Communities ==
=== Towns ===
- Easton (county seat)
- Oxford
- Queen Anne (partly in Queen Anne's County)
- Saint Michaels
- Trappe

=== Census-designated places ===
The Census Bureau recognizes the following census-designated places in the county:

- Cordova
- Tilghman Island

=== Unincorporated communities ===
- Anchorage
- Bellevue
- Bozman
- Claiborne
- Copperville
- Doncaster
- Fairbanks
- Lewistown
- Lloyd Landing
- Matthews
- McDaniel
- Neavitt
- Newcomb
- Royal Oak
- Sherwood
- Tunis Mills
- Unionville
- Wittman
- Windy Hill
- Woodland
- Wye Mills

=== Ghost towns ===
- Doncaster
- Dover
- York
- Wyetown

== Notable people ==
Prominent current or former residents of the county include:

- August Belmont IV, investment banker, racehorse owner, chairman of The Jockey Club
- Bertram Benedict, author, editor, owner of the Editorial Research Reports
- Bill Veeck, American Major League Baseball franchise owner, began the racial integration of the American League, World Series champion
- Birch Bayh, former U.S. Senator, author of Title IX
- Bob Harvey, former Negro league baseball player
- Casey Cep, author, journalist
- Charles D. Hodges, lawyer, former U.S. Congressman
- Charles Sidney Winder, U.S. Army officer and Confederate general officer
- Covey T. Oliver, former U.S. Ambassador to Colombia, director of President John F. Kennedy's Alliance for Progress, law professor
- David Bronson, former U.S. Congressman
- Donald Hiss, lawyer, law professor, alleged member of the Ware Group and the Communist Party, brother of Alger Hiss
- Edward Lloyd, member of the Continental Congress
- Forrest Shreve (1878–1950), botanist, professor, founder of the Ecological Society of America
- Frederick Douglass, orator, social reformer, former slave
- Harold Baines, former Major League Baseball player for the Chicago White Sox
- Harry Hughes, 57th Governor of Maryland
- Henry C. Lay, author, bishop
- James Harry Covington, lawyer, former U.S. Congressman, chief justice of the Supreme Court of the District of Columbia, founder of Covington & Burling
- James Wilson Rouse, real estate developer
- Jeannie Haddaway, former member of the Maryland House of Delegates
- Jody Schulz, former National Football League player for the Philadelphia Eagles
- John Needles (1786–1878), Quaker abolitionist
- Johnny Mautz, Maryland state senator
- Jonathan S. Willis, former U.S. Congressman
- Joseph B. Seth, lawyer, 66th President of the Maryland Senate, founder and president of the Baltimore and Eastern Shore Railway
- Lucy Kennedy Miller, prominent American suffragist
- Maggie Rogers, singer-songwriter
- Mark W. Delahay, author, judge, friend of Abraham Lincoln, founder of the U.S. Republican Party
- Mary Elizabeth Banning, Maryland's first myconologist (fungi biologist), teacher, botanical illustrator
- Nathaniel Hopkins, former slave, founder of Talbot County Emancipation Day, founder of Trappe's first black school
- Oswald Tilghman
- Perry Benson, Revolutionary War and War of 1812 hero
- George Pickering (1769–1846), was, at his death, the oldest effective Methodist minister in the world born in Talbot County
- Ralph A. Gamble, lawyer, former U.S. Congressman
- Robert Bauman, former U.S. Congressman, national chairman for Young Americans for Freedom and the American Conservative Union
- Robert Henry Goldsborough, former U.S. Senator
- Robert Morris, Jr., signer of the Declaration of Independence; his father made his fortune in Oxford, Maryland
- Samuel Hambleton (1812–1886), former U.S. Congressman
- Samuel J. Seymour, witness to the assassination of U.S. President Abraham Lincoln
- Samuel Stevens, Jr. 18th Governor of Maryland
- Tench Francis Jr., agent for the William Penn family, first cashier of the Bank of North America
- Tench Tilghman, aide to General George Washington
- Thomas B. Symons, academic, entomologist, President of the University of Maryland, College Park, representative at the Jamestown Exposition
- William Green, author, former slave
- Willard Carroll, producer, writer, director, founder of Hyperion Pictures
- Willard Goldsmith Rouse, grandfather of real estate developer Willard Rouse III, great-grandfather of actor Edward Norton

== See also ==
- National Register of Historic Places listings in Talbot County, Maryland
- USS Talbot County landing ship named for Talbot County, Maryland and Talbot County, Georgia
