= Unionville, Talbot County, Maryland =

Unincorporated community in Maryland, United States

Unionville, Maryland
- Unincorporated community
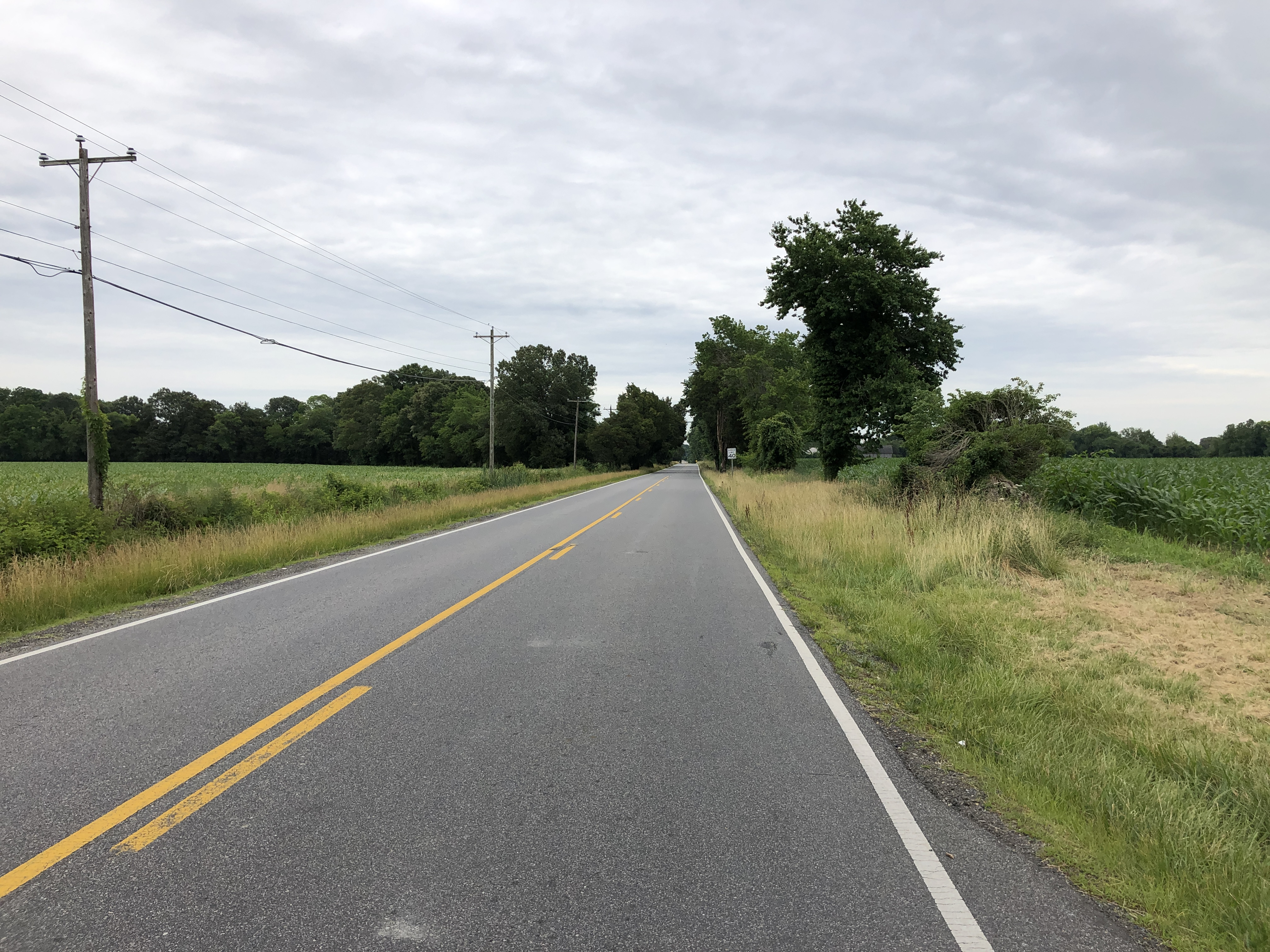
- View from Maryland State Route 370 outside of Unionville, MD

- Location within Maryland
- Coordinates: 38°48′48″N 76°08′23″W
- Country: United States
- State: Maryland
- County: Talbot
- Elevation: 13 ft (4.0 m)
- Time zone: UTC-5 (Eastern (EST))
  - Summer (DST): UTC-4 (EDT)
- Area codes: 410 & 443
- GNIS feature ID: 591456

Unionville is an unincorporated community in Talbot County, Maryland, United States. Unionville is located on Maryland Route 370, 4.5 miles (7.2 km) northwest of Easton.

Unionville may be the only village in the U.S. founded by formerly enslaved soldiers. In Unionville, a historic marker reads: “Unionville: Historic African-American community settled by ex-slaves and free blacks. Many were in [the] Union Army in [the] Civil War; [the] village's name honors [these] local soldiers. Unionville grew after the war to nearly 40 buildings with [a] church and school. In [the] cemetery are 18 black soldiers who fought for the Union 1863-1866.”

The formation of Unionville is widely credited to Ezekiel and his son James M. Cowgill, Quakers who owned nearby Lombardy Plantation. In 1856, they carved out a parcel of land for these veterans described in the sign. Another of Ezekiel's sons, John Cowgill, who was also a Quaker, served as Captain in Company A, 108th Regiment U.S. Colored Infantry, Army of the Cumberland even though he was a Quaker. The reasons why are not widely known. The Cowgills offered each of the eighteen veterans a plot of land for the rate of one dollar a year for thirty years. The land records show that the Cowgills intended not only to offer land for families but land to build a town. They stipulated in their leases that the plot of land was offered to free African-Americans provided that they would build a church and a school house in their community. Starting in 1867, the first leases variously state that the land was at “Lombardy” or sometimes “Cowgillstown,” but from 1870 onwards the leases read “The Village of Unionville”. Thus the village today is known as “Unionville” in honor of the Union Army that the African-Americans credit with winning their freedom. “Cowgillstown” also stands as a tribute to Ezekiel, John and James M. Cowgill, who championed the cause for justice, freedom, dignity, better living conditions and community for African-Americans during the Civil War and after Emancipation.
