= Oxford–Bellevue Ferry =

Ferry service across the Tred Avon River in Maryland, US

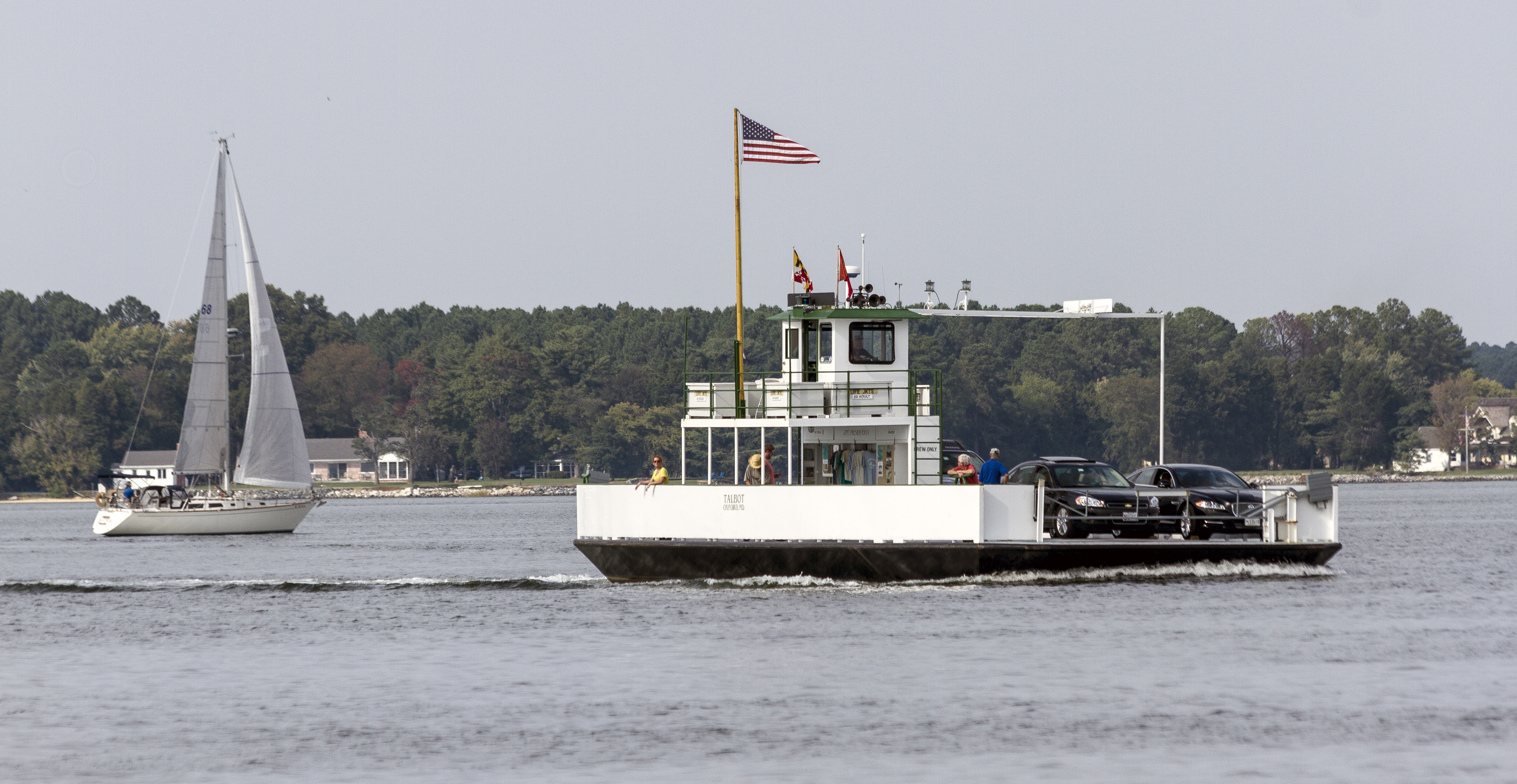
Oxford–Bellevue Ferry

The Oxford–Bellevue Ferry is a ferry service linking Bellevue, Maryland with Oxford, Maryland across the Tred Avon River. The ferry began operations in 1683 and is thought to be the oldest privately owned ferry service in the United States.

== History ==
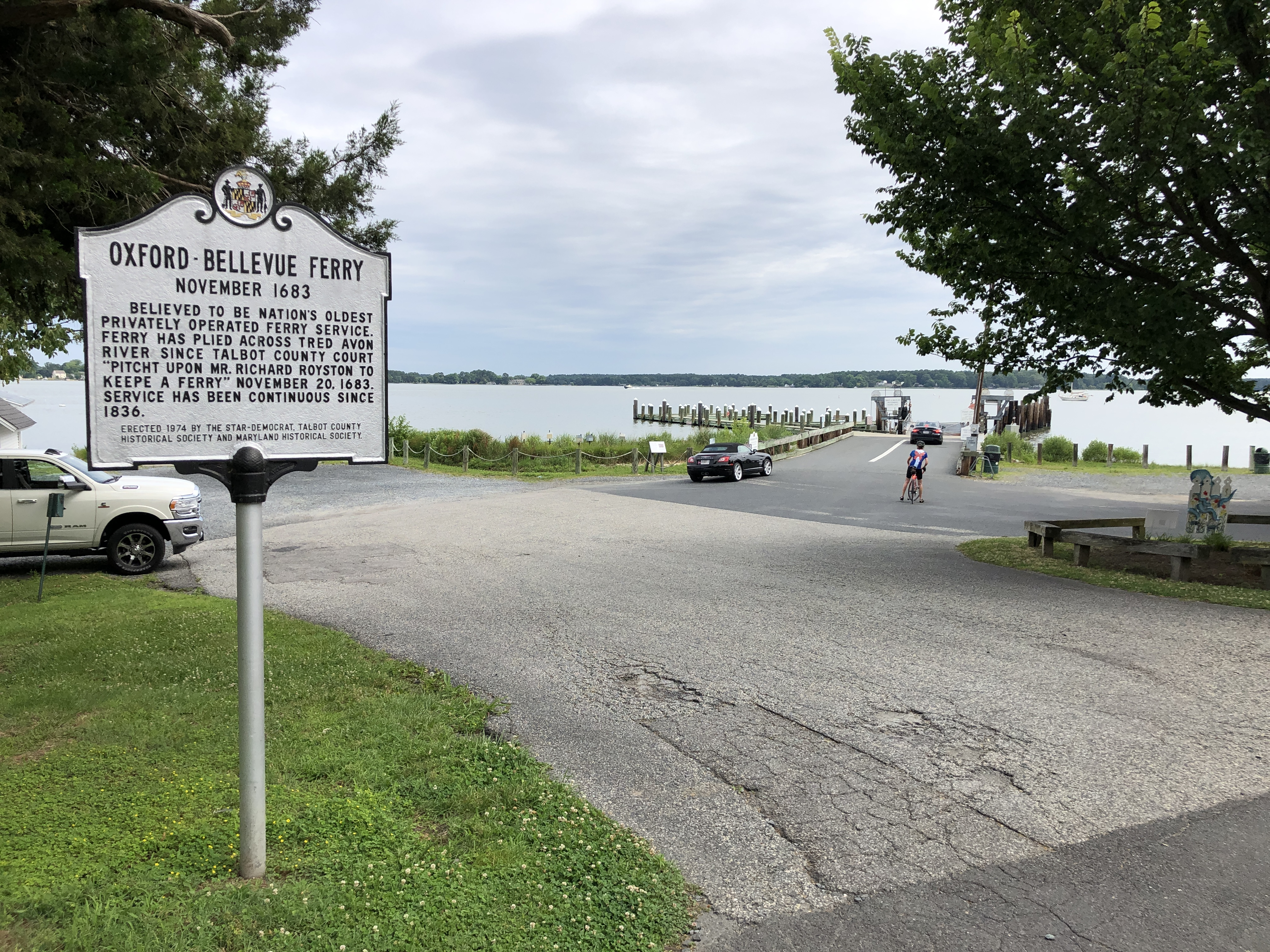
Oxford dock of the Oxford–Bellevue Ferry

In 2011, the ferry celebrated its 328th birthday. Until it switched to steam power in 1886, sails and oars were used to propel the boat carrying mostly local workers between orchards and farms. It has been continuously operated since 1836, seven days a week, except for November (weekends only). It is closed for the winter months between December and March.

The Talbot began service in July 1980 and participates in local celebrations, including an occasional wedding ceremony. As a small ferry, it only carries nine vehicles, passengers, bicycles and motorcycles, although it sometimes carries dump trucks and cherry pickers.

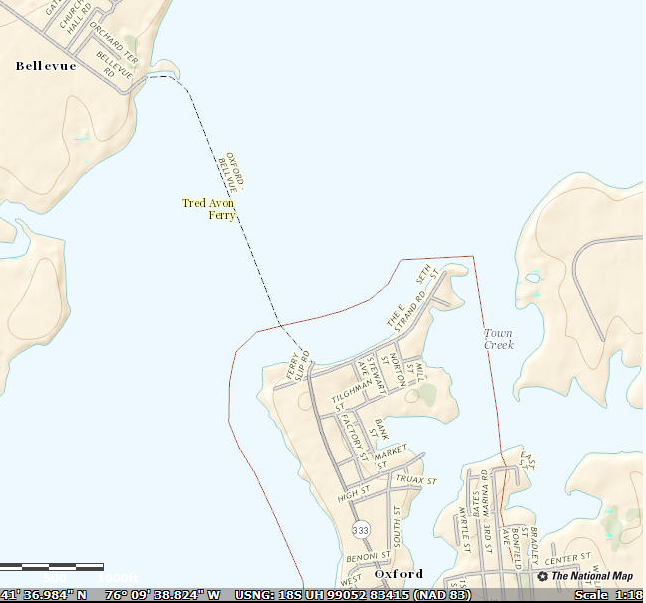
Ferry between Oxford and Bellevue, Maryland, across the Tred Avon River, retrieved from the USGS National Map website

== Location ==
The 3/4 mile trip takes approximately 10 minutes. It operates from April until November and is based at 27456 Oxford Road, Oxford, Maryland.

== News and events ==
The ferry was blessed on opening day, April 24, 2015, by The Reverend Kevin Cross of Oxford's Church of the Holy Trinity. Delays to opening this season were due to upgrades to its landing site on the Bellevue side, including "dolphin clusters" that guide the ferry into dock. The current owner-operators, Captains Tom and Judy Bixler, were on-hand to begin the season.
