= National Register of Historic Places listings in Talbot County, Maryland =

Location of Talbot County in Maryland

This is a list of the National Register of Historic Places listings in Talbot County, Maryland.

This is intended to be a complete list of the properties and districts on the National Register of Historic Places in Talbot County, Maryland, United States. Latitude and longitude coordinates are provided for many National Register properties and districts; these locations may be seen together in a map.

There are 64 properties and districts listed on the National Register in the county, including 5 National Historic Landmarks.

Contents: Counties in Maryland
Allegany - Anne Arundel - Baltimore (city) - Baltimore County - Calvert - Caroline - Carroll - Cecil - Charles - Dorchester - Frederick - Garrett - Harford - Howard - Kent - Montgomery - Prince George's - Queen Anne's - Somerset - St. Mary's - Talbot - Washington - Wicomico - Worcester

This National Park Service list is complete through NPS recent listings posted April 24, 2026.

== Current listings ==
	Name on the Register	Image	Date listed	Location	City or town	Description
1	All Saints' Church	All Saints' Church	May 27, 1983 (#83002962)	Maryland Route 662; 38°50′46″N 76°04′53″W	Easton	
2	The Anchorage	The Anchorage	July 30, 1974 (#74000968)	Northwest of Easton off Maryland Route 370; 38°47′41″N 76°07′49″W	Easton	
3	Barnaby House	Barnaby House	November 24, 1992 (#92001228)	212 N. Morris St. 38°41′26″N 76°10′25″W	Oxford	
4	Billie P. Hall (log canoe)		September 18, 1985 (#85002251)	Evergreen Rd. 38°40′27″N 76°08′25″W	Oxford	
5	Cannonball House	Cannonball House	December 3, 1980 (#80001839)	200 Mulberry St. 38°47′03″N 76°13′22″W	St. Michaels	
6	Claude W. Somers		May 16, 1985 (#85001085)	Old Ferry Terminal, Washington St. 38°50′11″N 76°16′51″W	Claiborne	
7	Clay's Hope	Clay's Hope	October 31, 1979 (#79001142)	Bellevue Rd. 38°42′25″N 76°11′17″W	Bellevue	
8	Compton		July 25, 1974 (#74000970)	West of Trappe on Howell Point Rd. 38°38′27″N 76°06′25″W	Trappe	
9	Crooked Intention		July 24, 1974 (#74000969)	West of Maryland Route 33; 38°46′44″N 76°13′53″W	St. Michaels	
10	Doncaster Town Site		September 5, 1975 (#75000920)	Buffs Island Rd., on the shores of Shaw Bay; 38°51′30″N 76°11′27″W	Easton	
11	E. C. Collier	E. C. Collier	May 16, 1985 (#85001087)	Gibsontown Rd. 38°42′46″N 76°19′53″W	Tilghman	
12	Easton Historic District	Easton Historic District	September 17, 1980 (#80001835)	Maryland Routes 328, 331, and 565; 38°46′19″N 76°04′26″W	Easton	
13	Edmee S. (log canoe)	Edmee S. (log canoe)	September 18, 1985 (#85002258)	Mill St. 38°47′15″N 76°13′09″W	St. Michaels	
14	Edna E. Lockwood (Chesapeake Bay bugeye)	Edna E. Lockwood (Chesapeake Bay bugeye)	February 13, 1986 (#86000258)	Navy Point at the foot of Mill St. 38°47′15″N 76°13′10″W	St. Michaels	
15	Far Horizons	Far Horizons	September 15, 2025 (#100012222)	7238 Drum Point Road; 38°44′54″N 76°13′00″W	St. Michaels	
16	Flying Cloud (log canoe)		September 18, 1985 (#85002263)	Magee Rd. 38°46′48″N 76°17′23″W	Wittman	
17	Fond Hope	Fond Hope	July 17, 2025 (#100012008)	27283 Baileys Neck Rd; 38°43′11″N 76°07′47″W	Easton	
18	Hilda M. Willing	Hilda M. Willing	May 16, 1985 (#85001089)	Gibsontown Rd. 38°42′46″N 76°19′53″W	Tilghman	
19	Hope House	Hope House	November 1, 1979 (#79001143)	Northwest of Easton, northeast of Voit Rd., and 0.8 miles northwest of the bridge at Tunis Mill; 38°50′01″N 76°11′10″W	Easton	
20	Island Bird (log canoe)		September 18, 1985 (#85002254)	Miles River Yacht Club; 38°48′00″N 76°13′10″W	St. Michaels	
21	Island Blossom (log canoe)		September 18, 1985 (#85002255)	Miles River Yacht Club; 38°48′00″N 76°13′10″W	St. Michaels	
22	Island Lark (log canoe)		September 18, 1985 (#85002259)	Carpenter St. 38°47′10″N 76°13′19″W	St. Michaels	
23	Jay Dee (log canoe)		September 18, 1985 (#85002256)	Miles River Yacht Club; 38°48′00″N 76°13′10″W	St. Michaels	
24	Jena	Jena	August 6, 1980 (#80001838)	East of Oxford off Maryland Route 333; 38°41′17″N 76°08′18″W	Oxford	
25	Kathryn	Kathryn	May 16, 1985 (#85001090)	Dogwood Harbor; 38°42′46″N 76°19′53″W	Tilghman Island	
26	Llandaff House	Llandaff House	December 27, 2002 (#02001587)	28472 Old Country Club Rd. 38°43′58″N 76°05′22″W	Easton	
27	Maggie Lee	Maggie Lee	May 16, 1985 (#85001091)	Gibsontown Rd. 38°42′46″N 76°19′53″W	Tilghman	
28	Magic (log canoe)		September 18, 1985 (#85002260)	St. Michaels Marina; 38°47′06″N 76°13′13″W	St. Michaels	
29	Miller's House	Miller's House	December 17, 2010 (#10001038)	Old Wye Mills Rd. 38°54′57″N 76°04′33″W	Wye Mills	
30	Minnie V	Minnie V	May 16, 1985 (#85001092)	Gibsontown Rd. 38°42′46″N 76°19′53″W	Tilghman	
31	Myrtle Grove		August 13, 1974 (#74000967)	Goldsborough Neck Rd. 38°48′15″N 76°07′06″W	Easton	
32	Nellie L. Byrd		May 16, 1985 (#85001093)	Gibsontown Rd. 38°42′46″N 76°19′53″W	Tilghman	
33	Noddy (log canoe)		September 18, 1985 (#85002257)	Deepwater Point Rd. 38°48′05″N 76°13′17″W	St. Michaels	
34	Old Bloomfield	Old Bloomfield	December 3, 1980 (#80001836)	West of Easton on Bloomfield Rd. 38°45′59″N 76°07′06″W	Easton	
35	The Old Inn	The Old Inn	March 25, 1980 (#80001840)	Talbot and Mulberry Sts. 38°47′01″N 76°13′25″W	St. Michaels	
36	Old Wye Church	Old Wye Church	August 9, 1984 (#84001888)	Queenstown-Easton Rd. 38°56′11″N 76°04′48″W	Wye Mills	
37	Orem's Delight		April 4, 1978 (#78001477)	South of Bellevue off Ferry Neck Rd., on Benoni Point Rd. 38°41′10″N 76°12′11″W	Bellevue	
38	Otwell	Otwell	March 15, 1982 (#82002819)	Otwell Rd. 38°41′55″N 76°08′16″W	Oxford	
39	Oxford Historic District	Oxford Historic District	December 28, 2005 (#05001481)	Roughly bounded by Tred Avon Rd., Town Creek, and Caroline Ave. 38°41′33″N 76°10′18″W	Oxford	
40	Paw Paw Cove Site	Paw Paw Cove Site	December 23, 2009 (#09001150)	Address Restricted	Tilghman	
41	Persistence (log canoe)		September 18, 1985 (#85002261)	St. Michaels Marina; 38°47′06″N 76°13′13″W	St. Michaels	
42	Ralph T. Webster		May 16, 1985 (#85001094)	Gibsontown Rd. 38°42′46″N 76°19′53″W	Tilghman	
43	Rebecca T. Ruark	Rebecca T. Ruark	May 16, 1985 (#85001095)	Gibsontown Rd. 38°42′46″N 76°19′53″W	Tilghman	
44	Reliance (Chesapeake Bay skipjack)		July 30, 1976 (#76001013)	Knapps Narrows off Maryland Route 33; 38°42′46″N 76°20′07″W	Tilghman	
45	Rock Clift		July 30, 1980 (#80001837)	Southeast of Matthews off Maryland Route 328; 38°48′12″N 75°56′37″W	Matthews	
46	Rover (log canoe)		September 18, 1985 (#85002262)	St. Michaels Marina; 38°47′06″N 76°13′13″W	St. Michaels	
47	Ruby G. Ford		May 16, 1985 (#85001096)	Gibsontown Rd. 38°42′46″N 76°19′53″W	Tilghman	Destroyed by fire
48	S. C. Dobson (log canoe)		September 18, 1985 (#85002252)	Peach Blossom Rd. 38°41′34″N 76°09′33″W	Oxford	
49	Saint Michaels Mill	Saint Michaels Mill	July 15, 1982 (#82002820)	100 Chew Ave. 38°46′56″N 76°13′13″W	St. Michaels	
50	Sandy (log canoe)		September 18, 1985 (#85002253)	Sherwood Rd. 38°45′40″N 76°19′09″W	Sherwood	
51	Sharps Island Light	Sharps Island Light	July 22, 1982 (#82002821)	Southwest of Tilghman Island; 38°38′19″N 76°22′05″W	Tilghman Island	
52	Sherwood Manor		April 5, 1977 (#77000701)	4 miles north of St. Michaels on Maryland Route 451; 38°50′00″N 76°15′42″W	St. Michaels	
53	Sigsbee	Sigsbee	May 16, 1985 (#85001097)	Knapps Narrows; 38°43′09″N 76°20′02″W	Tilghman	located in Baltimore, Maryland
54	St. John's Chapel of St. Michael's Parish	St. John's Chapel of St. Michael's Parish	March 30, 1973 (#73000938)	3 miles west of Easton on Maryland Route 370; 38°47′46″N 76°07′43″W	Easton	
55	St. Michaels Historic District	St. Michaels Historic District	September 11, 1986 (#86002427)	Roughly bounded by North Ave., Mill St., the Miles River, Seymour, Baltimore and Eastern Railroad tracks, and Glory Ave. 38°47′04″N 76°13′24″W	St. Michaels	
56	Stanley Norman	Stanley Norman	May 16, 1985 (#85001086)	Edgar Cove; 38°45′58″N 76°15′37″W	St. Michaels	
57	Tidewater Inn	Tidewater Inn	November 2, 2007 (#07001118)	101 E. Dover St. 38°46′28″N 76°04′29″W	Easton	
58	Troth's Fortune	Troth's Fortune	April 24, 1975 (#75000921)	30776 Triple Farm Way; 38°45′49″N 75°59′41″W	Easton	
59	Victorian Corn Cribs		January 11, 1976 (#76002289)	6.8 miles east of St. Michaels off Maryland Route 33; 38°47′10″N 76°08′11″W	St. Michaels	
60	Virginia W		May 16, 1985 (#85001098)	Knapps Narrows; 38°43′09″N 76°20′02″W	Tilghman	
61	The Wilderness		July 25, 1974 (#74000971)	Southwest of Trappe on Island Neck Rd. 38°38′22″N 76°08′12″W	Trappe	
62	Wye House	Wye House	April 15, 1970 (#70000264)	7 miles northwest of Easton on the Miles Neck River; 38°51′02″N 76°10′14″W	Easton	
63	Wye Mill	Wye Mill	April 9, 1985 (#85000717)	14296 Old Wye Mills Road (Maryland Route 662); 38°56′29″N 76°04′53″W	Wye Mills	
64	Wye Town Farm House		December 16, 1982 (#82001600)	Northwest of Easton on Bruff's Island Rd. 38°50′31″N 76°11′18″W	Easton	

== Former listings ==
	Name on the Register	Image	Date listed	Date removed	Location	City or town	Description
1	Esther F		May 7, 1985 (#85003738)	-	Gibsontown Road	Tilghman	Esther F. is a 39.5 ft (12.0 m) two-sail skipjack.

== See also ==
- List of National Historic Landmarks in Maryland
- National Register of Historic Places listings in Maryland
