= Mystery (log canoe) =

- MYSTERY (log canoe)
- U.S. National Register of Historic Places
- Location within Maryland Location within the United States
- Location: Round Top Rd., Kingstown, Maryland
- Coordinates: 39°12′29″N 76°2′16″W
- Area: less than one acre
- Built: 1932
- Built by: Sinclair, Harry
- Architectural style: Tilghman
- MPS: Chesapeake Bay Sailing Log Canoe Fleet TR
- NRHP reference No.: 85002250
- Added to NRHP: September 18, 1985

The Mystery is a Chesapeake Bay log canoe, built in 1932, by Harry Sinclair in Oxford, Maryland. She measures 34'-7" long, has a beam of 8'-8 1/2" and has a centerboard. She is noted for her very tall masts, is privately owned, and races under No. 8. She is one of the last 22 surviving traditional Chesapeake Bay racing log canoes that carry on a tradition of racing on the Eastern Shore of Maryland that has existed since the 1840s. She is located at Kingstown, Queen Anne's County, Maryland.

She was listed on the National Register of Historic Places in 1985.

== History ==
Mystery was built in a barn in Oxford, MD, as a secret weapon to defeat the Flying Cloud in the Governor's Cup, hence the name, Mystery. Results were mixed and she was eventually re-rigged as a sloop in the late-40s and was used as a cruising boat.

In 1955, she was purchased by John Whittum who sailed her all around the Chesapeake with her sloop rig until he re-rigged her for racing once again and began to compete in the log canoe regattas. He eventually won the Governor's Cup in 1962.

In the mid-70s, John moved to Colorado, leaving the Mystery with Francis Schauber who had been racing with him since the early 60's. Francis raced her for several years, before purchasing it outright in 1975. He then began a full overhaul on her, which by then, had been in serious disrepair. He stripped down the hull to the bare logs, cut out all the rotten spots and replaced the waterlogged plywood decks. He also increased her sail area substantially. The foremast height was increased to 60 feet, making it the tallest mast ever for a log canoe under 35 feet long. Mystery would hold this record until Jay Dee unveiled her 63-foot foremast in 2012.

== Recent history ==
Mystery has been refurbished many times over the years. Besides the overhaul from 1976, the most substantial occurred in 2001 when 'cheeks' were added to her hull, with the desired effect to make her more stable.

In 2008, Mystery lost her foremast in the CRYCC regatta in a heavy air race. The mast, which was over 30 years old at the time, was deemed unfixable and a new one was built in time for the last two regattas of the 2008 season.

=== 2013 racing season ===
In 2013, after only participating in two regattas during the 2012 season, Mystery made it out for the RHYC log canoe regatta, with the intent to compete in the rest of the season. However, the following week, once again in the CRYCC regatta, she lost her foremast when the shroud snapped. The mast was repaired, however she was unable to complete the season.

=== 2014 racing season ===
Mystery did not participate in the 2014 Racing Season.

== Trivia ==
In 1946, the owner at the time wanted to immortalize his son, who had been killed in World War II. For the racing season of that year, Mystery was temporarily renamed Memory.
