= Edna E. Lockwood =

- Edna E. Lockwood (Chesapeake Bay bugeye)
- U.S. National Register of Historic Places
- U.S. National Historic Landmark
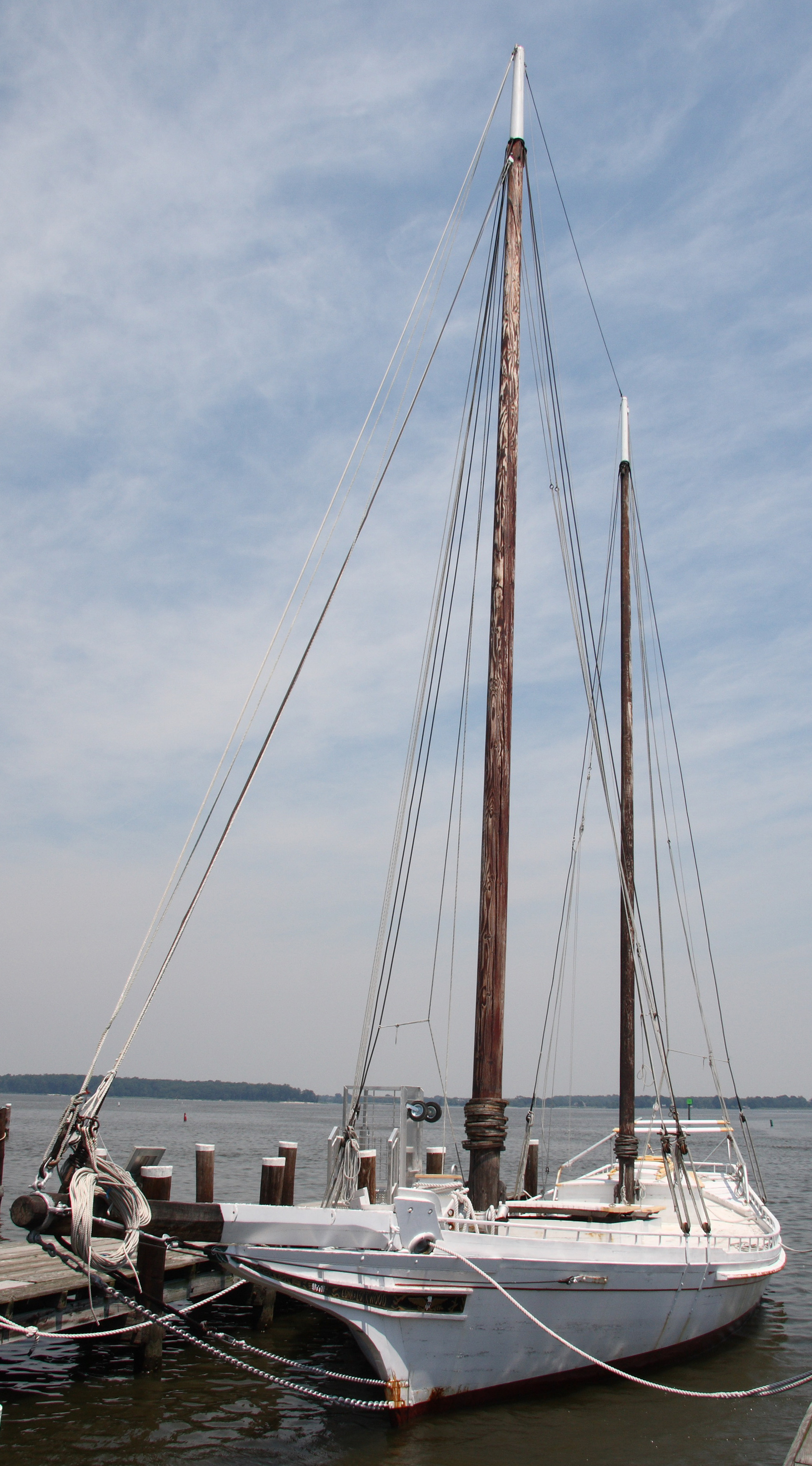

- Location within Maryland Location within the United States
- Location: St. Michaels, Maryland
- Coordinates: 38°47′15″N 76°13′10″W
- Built: 1889
- Architect: John B. Harrison
- NRHP reference No.: 86000258

Significant dates
- Added to NRHP: February 13, 1986
- Designated NHL: April 19, 1994

The Edna E. Lockwood is a Chesapeake Bay bugeye, the last working oyster boat of her kind. She is located at the Chesapeake Bay Maritime Museum in Saint Michaels, Maryland. She was built in 1889 at Tilghman Island, Maryland by John B. Harrison and is of nine-log construction, similar to the smaller log canoe, and was launched on October 5, 1889, for Daniel Haddaway, at a cost of $2,200. She worked for at least seven sets of owners from 1899 until 1967, and was then sailed as a yacht until donated to the museum in 1973. The museum undertook an extensive restoration of the Lockwood from 1975 through 1979, which restored the bugeye to its 1910 appearance with the "patent stern" that had been added sometime prior to that year. She is the last bugeye retaining the sailing rig and working appearance of the type. Her length is 53.5 feet (16.3 m), with a 15.25 feet (4.65 m) beam and a draft of 2.58 feet (0.79 m) with the centerboard up, and a maximum sail area of approximately 1700 square feet.

== History ==
The Lockwood was boatbuilder John B. Harrison's seventh bugeye, of the 18 he would build. Harrison was 24 years old when he built the Lockwood for Daniel W. Haddaway. Haddaway dredged for oysters from Tilghman Island with the Lockwood until 1892, when he sold the boat to James A. Roe and Richard T. Richardson. In 1895 Roe bought out Richardson, then sold Lockwood to John F. Tall, who operated from Cambridge, Maryland on the Choptank River. Tall installed the patent stern, wheel steering gear and powered dredge gear. Tall sold Lockwood to William H. Warfield in 1910, who in turn sold her to J. Hilleary Wingate in 1912, but the next year Warfield re-acquired a partial interest in the boat. Wingate eventually became sole owner and retained ownership until 1955, when he sold Lockwood to Nettie Wingate. From 1910 the Lockwood was homeported in Baltimore, but returned to Cambridge in 1923. From 1910 she oystered in the winter and hauled produce to Baltimore from the Eastern Shore of Maryland in the summer.

Nettie Wingate sold the Lockwood to William Jones Jr. in 1956, who in turn sold her to John Robin Kimberly. Kimberly used the Lockwood for dredging in 1966 and 1967. He donated the boat to the Chesapeake Bay Maritime Museum in 1973.

== Description ==
The Lockwood's nine-log bottom is original, using locally harvested pitch pine timbers. The keel log is 6 inches (15 cm) thick, with four outer logs on each side tapering to 2.5 inches (6.4 cm). The logs are connected with wrought iron bolts. The hull form is round-bottomed with a sharp entry and stern making her double-ended, and derives its shape from the original log canoe prototype. A "patent stern" is framed above the sternpost to widen the rear deck area. Framing and planking is used above the logs to add freeboard, with oak transverse frames 24 inches (61 cm) apart from the keel log to the top sheer strake supporting 1.5 inches (3.8 cm) oak planking. The sheer strake is oak, 2.5 inches (6.4 cm) by 8 inches (20 cm). Planking is fastened with galvanized bolts. The centerboard, which allows better performance to windward while retailing a shallow draft, is located in a pine trunk fastened to the keel log. Decking is 2¼" × 4" fir laid fore-and-aft, supported on beams joining the frames. A king plank, composed of two 3½" × 4" boards, runs beneath the deck from the stem to the hatch abaft the foremast. A main hatch is located amidships between the masts, and a small cabin is abaft the mainmast. A small box for the steering gear is at the extreme stern.

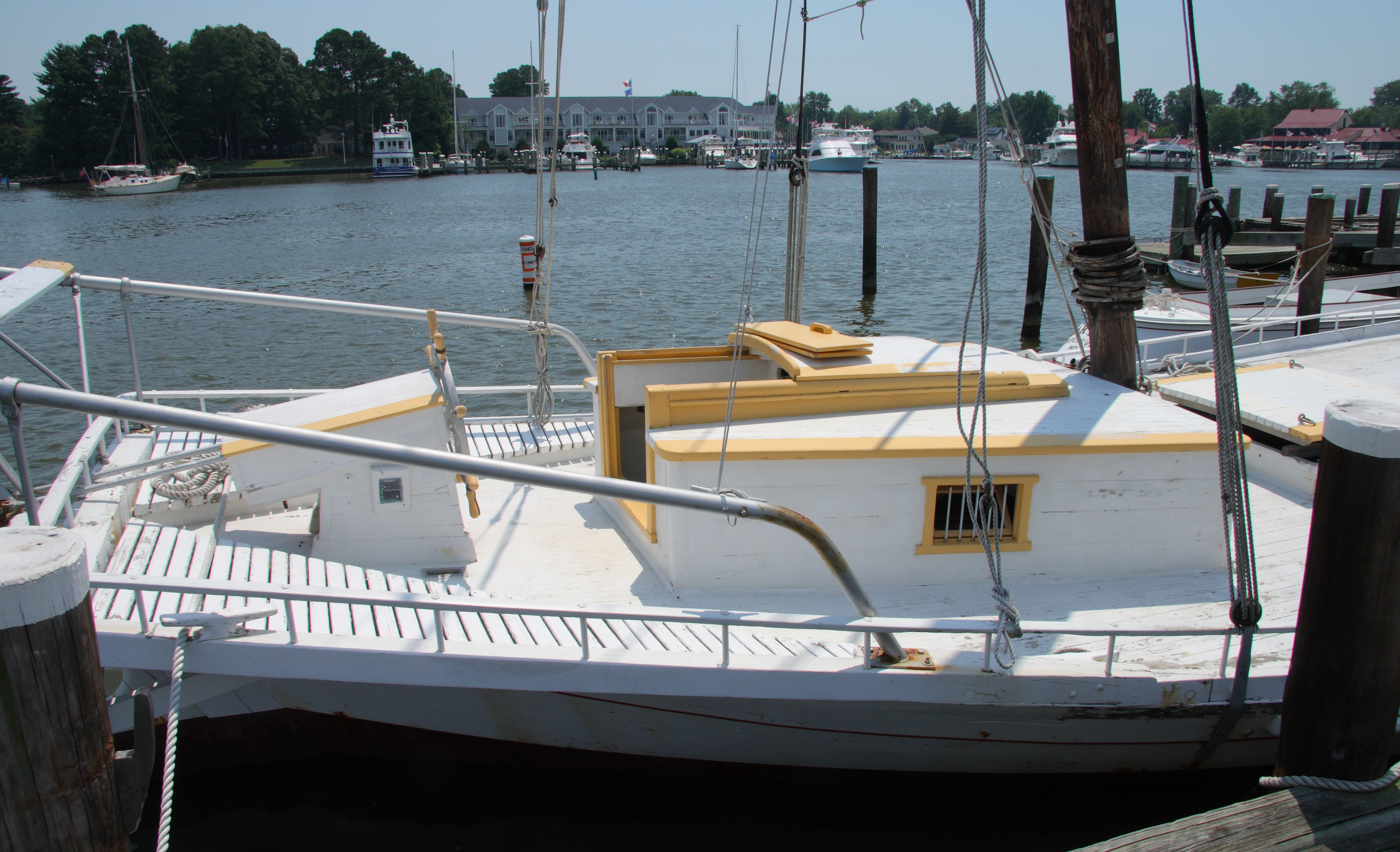
Stern of the Lockwood showing the patent stern, deckhouse and steering gear

The Lockwood is rigged with two pole masts, made from trimmed pine trees. The foremast is 50 feet (15 m) high and 12 inches (30 cm) in diameter, while the shorter mainmast is 46 feet (14 m) high and 9 inches (23 cm) in diameter. Masts are raked at a traditionally extreme 15 degrees, facilitating sail reefing and maintaining a steady center of force under most rigging conditions. The rake also permitted the mast to be used as a crane for unloading the hold. The fore and main masts carried baggy triangular leg of mutton sails, with a jib on the foremast to the bowsprit.

== Restoration ==
The Chesapeake Bay Maritime Museum acquired the Lockwood in 1973 in near-sinking condition. Restoration began in 1975 and was completed by 1979 under the supervision of Maynard Lowery to naval architect John Lord's plans. Changes from the original construction included stronger full frames instead of the original partial frames, and some heavier framing members.

The Lockwood was declared a National Historic Landmark in 1994. The identity of her namesake is known to be Edna Elizabeth Lockwood, born 31 January 1889 in Washington D. C. She died on 8 July 1974 in Washington D. C. Why the boat was named for her is not clear. Her father was Edward Jones Lockwood, a passenger agent for the Norfolk & Western Railway. The boat is maintained in sailing condition and sails the Chesapeake Bay for special events.

== See also ==
- List of National Historic Landmarks in Maryland
- National Register of Historic Places listings in Talbot County, Maryland
