= Kingstown, Maryland =

- CDP
- Coordinates: 39°12′32″N 76°2′35″W
- Country: United States
- State: Maryland
- County: Queen Anne's

Area
  - Total: 2.58 sq mi (6.68 km^{2})
  - Land: 2.27 sq mi (5.87 km^{2})
  - Water: 0.31 sq mi (0.81 km^{2})
- Elevation: 16 ft (5 m)

Population (2020)
  - Total: 1,689
  - Density: 745.5/sq mi (287.84/km^{2})
- Time zone: UTC−5 (Eastern (EST))
  - Summer (DST): UTC−4 (EDT)
- FIPS code: 24-44325
- GNIS feature ID: 0597643

Kingstown is a census-designated place (CDP) in Queen Anne's County, Maryland, United States. The population was 1,644 at the 2000 census.

== History ==
The log canoe Mystery was listed on the National Register of Historic Places in 1985.

== Geography ==
Kingstown is located at 39°12′32″N 76°2′35″W (39.208840, −76.043034).

According to the United States Census Bureau, the CDP has a total area of 2.6 square miles (6.7 km^{2}), of which 2.2 square miles (5.7 km^{2}) is land and 0.3 square miles (0.78 km^{2}) (12.11%) is water.

== Demographics ==
Historical population
Census	Pop.	Note	%±
2020	1,689		—
U.S. Decennial Census

=== 2020 census ===
As of the 2020 census, Kingstown had a population of 1,689. The median age was 44.8 years. 19.7% of residents were under the age of 18 and 24.4% of residents were 65 years of age or older. For every 100 females there were 90.8 males, and for every 100 females age 18 and over there were 89.9 males age 18 and over.

92.4% of residents lived in urban areas, while 7.6% lived in rural areas.

There were 704 households in Kingstown, of which 25.6% had children under the age of 18 living in them. Of all households, 50.0% were married-couple households, 14.9% were households with a male householder and no spouse or partner present, and 27.6% were households with a female householder and no spouse or partner present. About 28.4% of all households were made up of individuals and 17.1% had someone living alone who was 65 years of age or older.

There were 792 housing units, of which 11.1% were vacant. The homeowner vacancy rate was 0.8% and the rental vacancy rate was 7.6%.

Racial composition as of the 2020 census
Race	Number	Percent
White	1,439	85.2%
Black or African American	96	5.7%
American Indian and Alaska Native	0	0.0%
Asian	13	0.8%
Native Hawaiian and Other Pacific Islander	0	0.0%
Some other race	42	2.5%
Two or more races	99	5.9%
Hispanic or Latino (of any race)	52	3.1%

=== 2000 census ===
As of the census of 2000, there were 1,644 people, 668 households, and 486 families residing in the CDP. The population density was 733.2 inhabitants per square mile (283.1/km^{2}). There were 719 housing units at an average density of 320.7 per square mile (123.8/km^{2}). The racial makeup of the CDP was 92.82% White, 6.14% African American, 0.18% Native American, 0.49% Asian, 0.06% from other races, and 0.30% from two or more races. Hispanic or Latino of any race were 0.55% of the population.

There were 668 households, out of which 31.1% had children under the age of 18 living with them, 60.6% were married couples living together, 10.2% had a female householder with no husband present, and 27.2% were non-families. 22.9% of all households were made up of individuals, and 10.9% had someone living alone who was 65 years of age or older. The average household size was 2.46 and the average family size was 2.88.

In the CDP, the population was spread out, with 24.5% under the age of 18, 5.1% from 18 to 24, 24.9% from 25 to 44, 27.1% from 45 to 64, and 18.4% who were 65 years of age or older. The median age was 42 years. For every 100 females, there were 93.2 males. For every 100 females age 18 and over, there were 88.6 males.

The median income for a household in the CDP was $49,539, and the median income for a family was $59,063. Males had a median income of $40,820 versus $26,167 for females. The per capita income for the CDP was $26,616. About 1.3% of families and 4.2% of the population were below the poverty line, including 3.9% of those under age 18 and none of those age 65 or over.
