= Stanley Norman (skipjack) =

- U.S. National Register of Historic Places
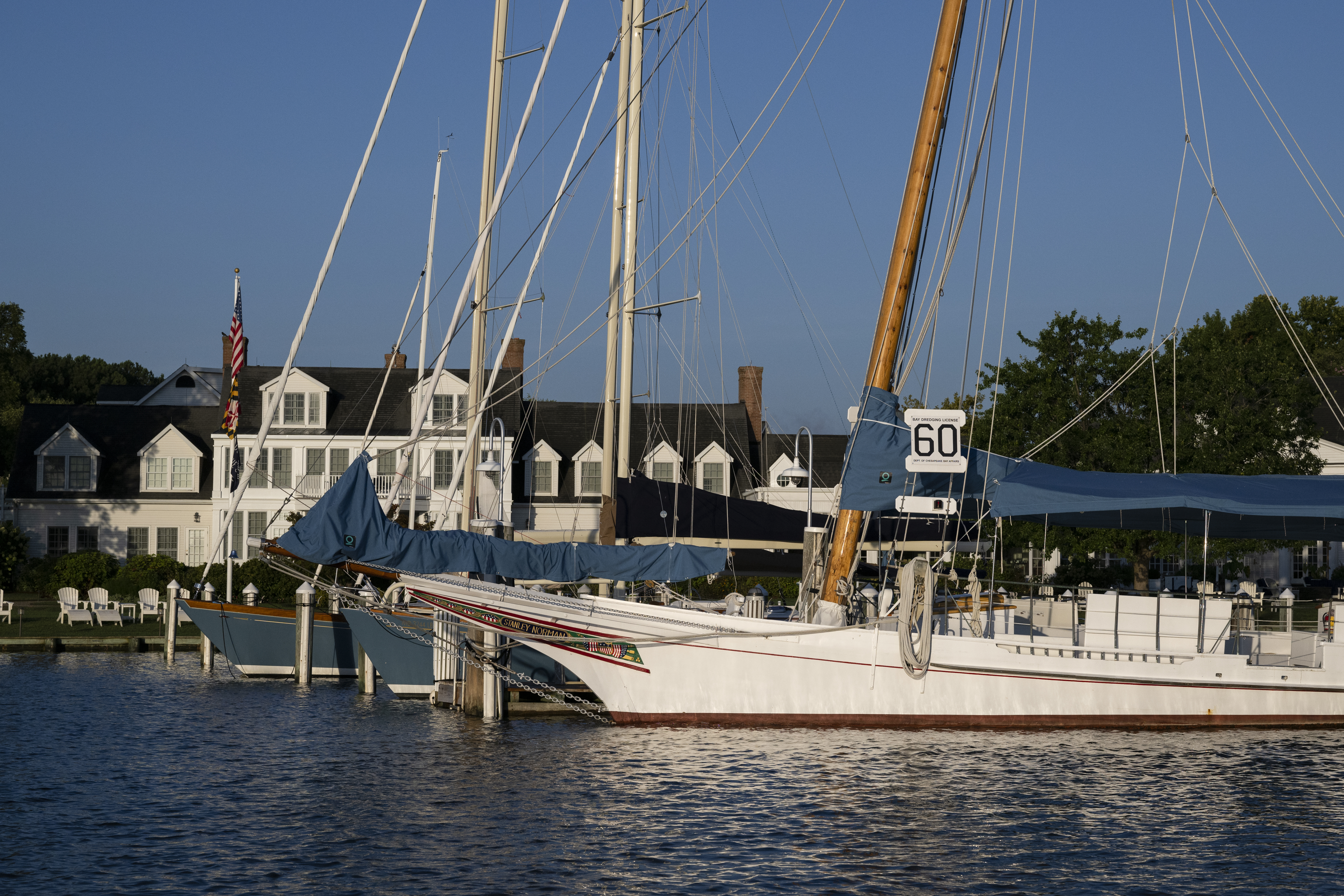

- Location within Maryland Location within the United States
- Location: Inn at Perry Cabin
- Built: 1902
- Architectural style: Skipjack
- MPS: Chesapeake Bay Skipjack Fleet TR
- NRHP reference No.: 85001086
- Added to NRHP: May 16, 1985

The Stanley Norman is a Chesapeake Bay skipjack, built in 1902 by Otis Lloyd, Salisbury, Maryland. She is 78 feet 3 inches (23.85 m) in length overall with length on deck (LOD) OF 63.5 feet (19.4 m) two-sail bateau, or "V"-bottomed deadrise type of centerboard sloop. She has a beam of 16 feet (4.9 m), a depth of 4 feet (1.2 m) at the stern with the centerboard up, and a registered tonnage of 7 tons.

Stanley Norman is one of the 35 surviving traditional Chesapeake Bay skipjacks and was a member of the last commercial sailing fleet in the United States. The vessel was extensively rebuilt, renovated and the process documented from 1976 to 1980. In 1990 the vessel was sold to the Chesapeake Bay Foundation and is based in Annapolis, Maryland, used as a teaching vessel. On December 9, 2003, a fire in the cabin caused some damage, though there was no major damage.

The vessel was based in Annapolis at either Annapolis City Dock near the Annapolis Summer Garden Theatre (as pictured) or the Annapolis Maritime Museum (Note: City Dock is in the center of historic Annapolis. The Annapolis Maritime Museum is located in the Eastport area of Annapolis at 723 Second Street where the museum's own historic skipjack, Wilma Lee is based.) and also operated from the Chesapeake Bay Maritime Museum in St. Michaels, Talbot County, Maryland. The teaching program aboard covered history and present issues of the Chesapeake, including the life of the Bay's watermen, and allowed participants to dredge for oysters and conduct water quality tests. The Stanley Norman was retired from the Chesapeake Bay Foundation's fleet in the summer of 2020. On May 9, 2022, the Stanley Norman was purchased by RDC Inn at Perry Cabin LLC and now resides at Inn at Perry Cabin resort along the Miles River in St. Michaels, Maryland.

She was listed on the National Register of Historic Places in 1985. She is assigned Maryland dredge number 60, and was previously dredge 20.
