= Paw Paw Cove Site =

- U.S. National Register of Historic Places
- Nearest city: Tilghman, Maryland
- Area: 10 acres (4.0 ha)
- NRHP reference No.: 09001150
- Added to NRHP: December 23, 2009

The Paw Paw Cove Site is an archaeological site on the coast of Talbot County, Maryland. The site, first identified in 1979, is a complex of three locations on 500 metres (1,600 ft) of shoreline on the Chesapeake Bay, at which stone artifacts with an estimated date of 11,500 to 10,500 BCE have been found. Among the finds are fluted projectile points and flakes created during the manufacture of such points.

The site was listed on the National Register of Historic Places in 2009. It is owned by Eastern Shore Land Conservancy.

== See also ==
- National Register of Historic Places listings in Talbot County, Maryland
