= Island Blossom =

- ISLAND BLOSSOM (log canoe)
- U.S. National Register of Historic Places
- Location within Maryland Location within the United States
- Nearest city: St. Michaels, Maryland
- Coordinates: 38°48′0″N 76°13′10″W
- Built: 1892
- Architect: Covington, William S.
- Architectural style: Tilghman
- MPS: Chesapeake Bay Sailing Log Canoe Fleet TR
- NRHP reference No.: 85002255
- Added to NRHP: September 18, 1985

The Island Blossom is a three-log Chesapeake Bay log canoe, built between 1892 and 1895 by William Sidney Covington in Tilghman, Maryland for William H. Myers, Jr. of Oxford, Maryland. She is a 32 ft 7.5 in (9.944 m) sailing log canoe with a beam of 6 feet 7.5 inches (2.019 m). Double-ended, her bow is sharp with a straight, slightly raking stem and a longhead, and she has a sharp stern. The canoe is privately owned by the family John C. North II, descendants of Mr. Covington, and races under No. 9. She is one of the last 22 surviving traditional Chesapeake Bay log canoes, carrying on a tradition of racing on the Eastern Shore of Maryland that has existed since the 1840s. Island Blossom followed two of Covington's slightly larger canoes, Island Bride and Island Belle, both of which were raced for Baltimore athletic clubs and were well documented champions on the Chesapeake. Steered in her early years by John Gibson and Buck Richardson, Blossom was built to race and has had an illustrious career that continues to this day.

Skippered from 1999-2023 by Corbin Penwell of St. Michaels, Maryland, with a crew that still includes several members from his first three campaigns, Island Blossom has won a record 15 consecutive High Point trophies for the fleet's overall season winner, finishing first overall from 2009–2024 (the fleet skipped the 2020 season due to COVID-19). Starting with the 2024 season, Blossom has been steered by Patrick Penwell and Jeff Cox. Blossom's streak topped the previous mark of six in a row originally set by Doug Hanks Sr., also aboard Blossom, between 1981-1986 and matched by Tyler Johnson on Persistence from 1998-2003 and Blossom under Penwell from 2009-2014. Island Blossom has won 29 High Point trophies overall since the award was established in 1969, including 18 of the past 20. She is located at St. Michaels, Talbot County, Maryland.==References==

She was listed on the National Register of Historic Places in 1985.
