= Oxford Historic District (Oxford, Maryland) =

Historic district in Maryland, United States

- U.S. National Register of Historic Places
- U.S. Historic district
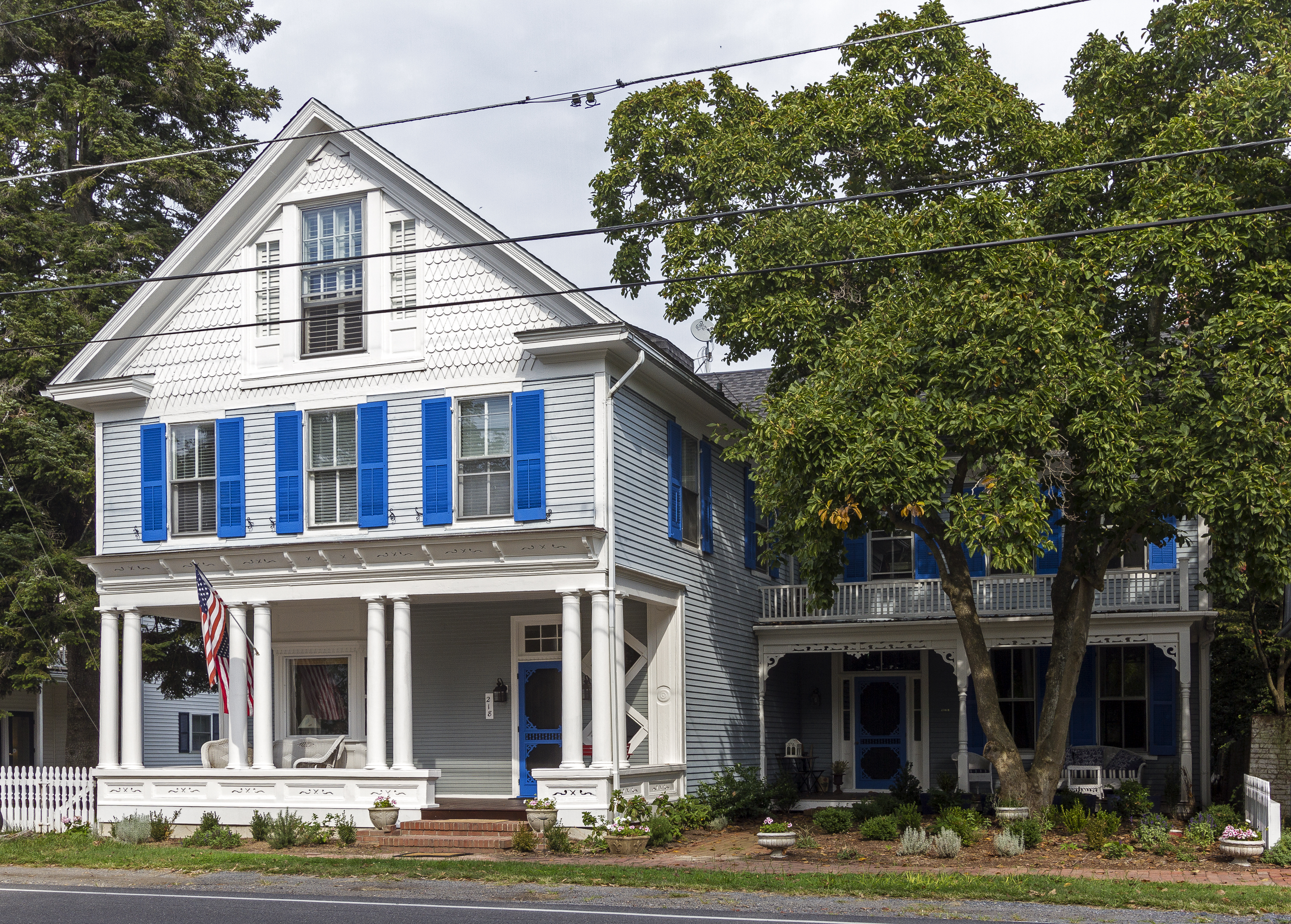

- Location within Maryland Location within the United States
- Location: Roughly bounded by Tred Avon R, Town Creek and Caroline Ave., Oxford, Maryland
- Coordinates: 38.6925°N 76.171667°W
- Area: 129 acres (52 ha)
- Built: 1688
- Architectural style: Georgian, Federal
- NRHP reference No.: 05001481
- Added to NRHP: December 28, 2005

The Oxford Historic District encompasses the peninsular portion of the town of Oxford, Maryland. Established as the site of a ferry across the Tred Avon River in 1683, the historic portion of the town occupies a peninsula between that river and Town Creek. The town did not experience any significant growth until the late 19th century, which is when most its buildings were constructed. Most of these building were, however, built in a town grid that was laid out in the 17th century. Although there are some late 18th and early 19th century buildings, late Victorian styles make up 90% of the district's building stock.

The district was listed on the National Register of Historic Places in 2005.

== See also ==
- National Register of Historic Places listings in Talbot County, Maryland
