= Oliver's Gift (log canoe) =

- OLIVER'S GIFT (log canoe)
- U.S. National Register of Historic Places
- Location within Maryland Location within the United States
- Nearest city: Davidsonville, Maryland
- Coordinates: 38°57′58″N 76°36′22″W
- Built: 1947
- Architect: Duke, Oliver
- Architectural style: Tilghman
- MPS: Chesapeake Bay Sailing Log Canoe Fleet TR
- NRHP reference No.: 85002247
- Added to NRHP: September 18, 1985

The Oliver's Gift is a Chesapeake Bay log canoe, built in 1947, by Oliver Duke. She measures 30'-7" long, has a beam of 7'-3". She is one of the last 22 surviving traditional Chesapeake Bay racing log canoes that carry on a tradition of racing on the Eastern Shore of Maryland that has existed since the 1840s. She is located at Davidsonville, Anne Arundel County, Maryland.

She was listed on the National Register of Historic Places in 1985.
