= Sherwood, Maryland =

Unincorporated community in Maryland, United States

- Unincorporated community
- Location within Maryland
- Coordinates: 38°45′41″N 76°19′08″W
- Country: United States
- State: Maryland
- County: Talbot
- Elevation: 7 ft (2.1 m)
- Time zone: UTC-5 (Eastern (EST))
  - Summer (DST): UTC-4 (EDT)
- ZIP code: 21665
- Area codes: 410, 443, and 667
- GNIS feature ID: 591272

Sherwood is an unincorporated community in Talbot County, Maryland, United States. Sherwood is located along Maryland Route 33 on the eastern shore of the Chesapeake Bay, south of Claiborne and north of Tilghman Island. USPS has assigned Sherwood the ZIP Code 21665. The Sandy, a log canoe ported in Sherwood, was listed on the National Register of Historic Places in 1985.
