= Hooper Strait Light =

Lighthouse in Maryland, United States

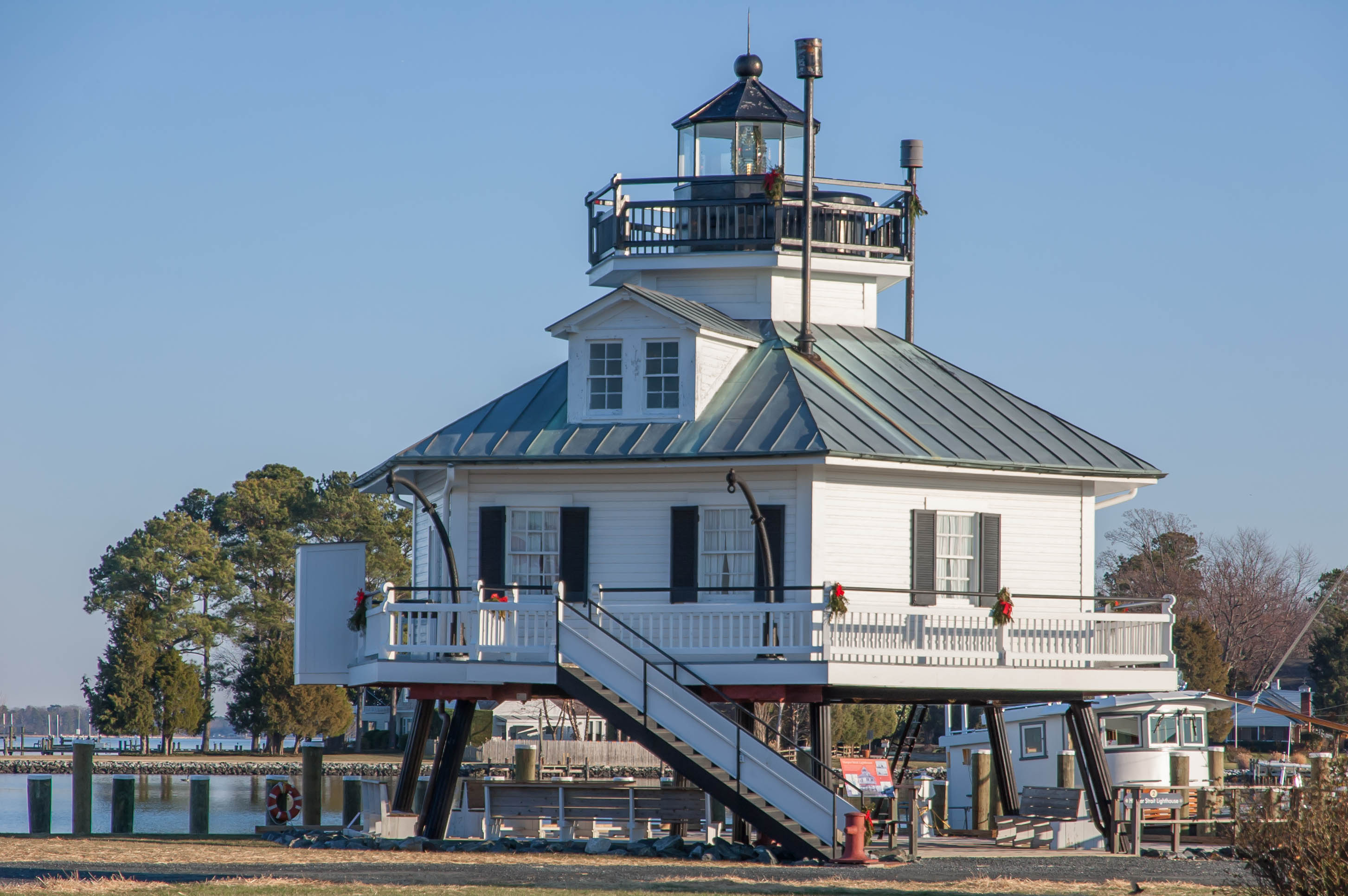
- Undated photograph of Hooper Strait Light (USCG)
- Location: Originally in Hooper Strait north of Bloodsworth Island in the Chesapeake Bay; relocated to the Chesapeake Bay Maritime Museum
- Coordinates: 38.2267°N 76.0756°W (original); 38.7875°N 76.2192°W (current)

Tower
- Foundation: screw-pile
- Construction: cast-iron/wood
- Automated: 1954
- Shape: hexagonal house

Light
- First lit: 1867
- Deactivated: 1966
- Lens: fifth-order Fresnel lens

Hooper Strait Light is one of four surviving Chesapeake Bay screw-pile lighthouses in the U.S. state of Maryland. Originally located in Hooper Strait, between Hooper and Bloodsworth Islands in Dorchester County and at the entrance to Tangier Sound, it is now an exhibit at the Chesapeake Bay Maritime Museum in St. Michaels, Maryland.

== History ==
Lightships were stationed at this site beginning in 1827, including one destroyed by confederate forces during the Civil War. In 1867 a square screw-pile structure was erected. It survived only ten years; in January 1877 ice tore the house loose and sent it floating down the bay. The keeper John S. Cornwell and his assistant barely escaped using one of the light's boats, and were trapped on the ice for 24 hours before being rescued. In spite of frostbite, Cornwell said that "should there be another house erected, or a boat placed in the site of the old one, Capt. Conway [his assistant] and myself will be ready to take charge of it[.]" Lighthouse tenders sent after the sunken house located it some five miles (8 km) south of the strait and were able to salvage the lens, lamp, and fog bell.

A new light was erected at the same location in 1879, another screw-pile light of the then typical hexagonal form, with the house being prefabricated at the Lazarretto Point depot. John Cornwell did in fact become the first keeper of the new light. In 1882 a red sector was fitted. This light remained staffed until 1954, at which point it was automated and the house boarded up.

In the 1960s the Coast Guard had taken to removing the houses from the old screw-pile lights in order to cut maintenance costs and avoid vandalism; a skeleton tower would then be erected on the old foundation. The Hooper Strait Light was slated to be so treated in 1966, but the newly founded Chesapeake Bay Maritime Museum arranged with the Historical Society of Talbot County and the federal government to have the light moved to its campus instead. The light was sliced in half at its eaves, and the two pieces of the house were barged to St. Michaels, where they were reassembled on a newly constructed foundation on Navy Point. This was the first successful preservation effort of its kind in the bay, laying a precedent for the removal and preservation of the Drum Point and Seven Foot Knoll lights. The light remains a showpiece of the museum and a landmark on the St. Michaels waterfront.
