= Wittman, Maryland =

Unincorporated community in Maryland, United States

- Unincorporated community
- Location within Maryland
- Coordinates: 38°47′37″N 76°17′39″W
- Country: United States
- State: Maryland
- County: Talbot
- Elevation: 7 ft (2.1 m)
- Time zone: UTC-5 (Eastern (EST))
  - Summer (DST): UTC-4 (EDT)
- ZIP code: 21676
- Area codes: 410, 443, and 667
- GNIS feature ID: 591579

Wittman is an unincorporated community in Talbot County, Maryland, United States. Wittman is located at the intersection of Pot Pie Road, New Road, and Cummings Road south of Claiborne. Wittman has a post office, with the ZIP code 21676. The Flying Cloud was listed on the National Register of Historic Places in 1985.
