= Island Lark =

- ISLAND LARK (log canoe)
- U.S. National Register of Historic Places
- Location within Maryland Location within the United States
- Location: Carpenter St., St. Michaels, Maryland
- Coordinates: 38°47′10″N 76°13′19″W
- Built: 1901
- Architectural style: Tilghman
- MPS: Chesapeake Bay Sailing Log Canoe Fleet TR
- NRHP reference No.: 85002259
- Added to NRHP: September 18, 1985

The Island Lark is a Chesapeake Bay log canoe, built in 1901 and restored by John Chamberlin in 1971. She is a 34'-11" sailing log canoe with a racing rig. She has a beam of 6'-9 1/8". She is double-ended with a sharp, raking stem, longhead bow, and sharp stern. Privately owned the canoe is raced on the Eastern Shore under No. 16. She is one of the last 22 surviving traditional Chesapeake Bay racing log canoes that carry on a tradition of racing on the Eastern Shore of Maryland that has existed since the 1840s. She is located at St. Michaels, Talbot County, Maryland.

She was listed on the National Register of Historic Places in 1985.
