= Billie P. Hall (log canoe) =

Log canoe

History
- Builder: Charles Tarr
- Launched: 1903
- Billie P. Hall (log canoe)
- U.S. National Register of Historic Places
- Location within Maryland
- Nearest city: Oxford, Maryland
- Coordinates: 38°40′27″N 76°8′25″W
- Built: 1903
- Architect: Tarr, Charles
- Architectural style: Tilghman
- MPS: Chesapeake Bay Sailing Log Canoe Fleet TR
- NRHP reference No.: 85002251
- Added to NRHP: 18 September 1985

Billie P. Hall is a Chesapeake Bay log canoe, built in 1903, by Charles Tarr. She is one of the last 22 surviving traditional Chesapeake Bay racing log canoes to carry on a tradition of racing on the Eastern Shore of Maryland that has existed since the 1840s. She is located at Oxford, Talbot County, Maryland.

She was listed on the National Register of Historic Places in 1985.
