= Edmee S. =

- EDMEE S. (log canoe)
- U.S. National Register of Historic Places
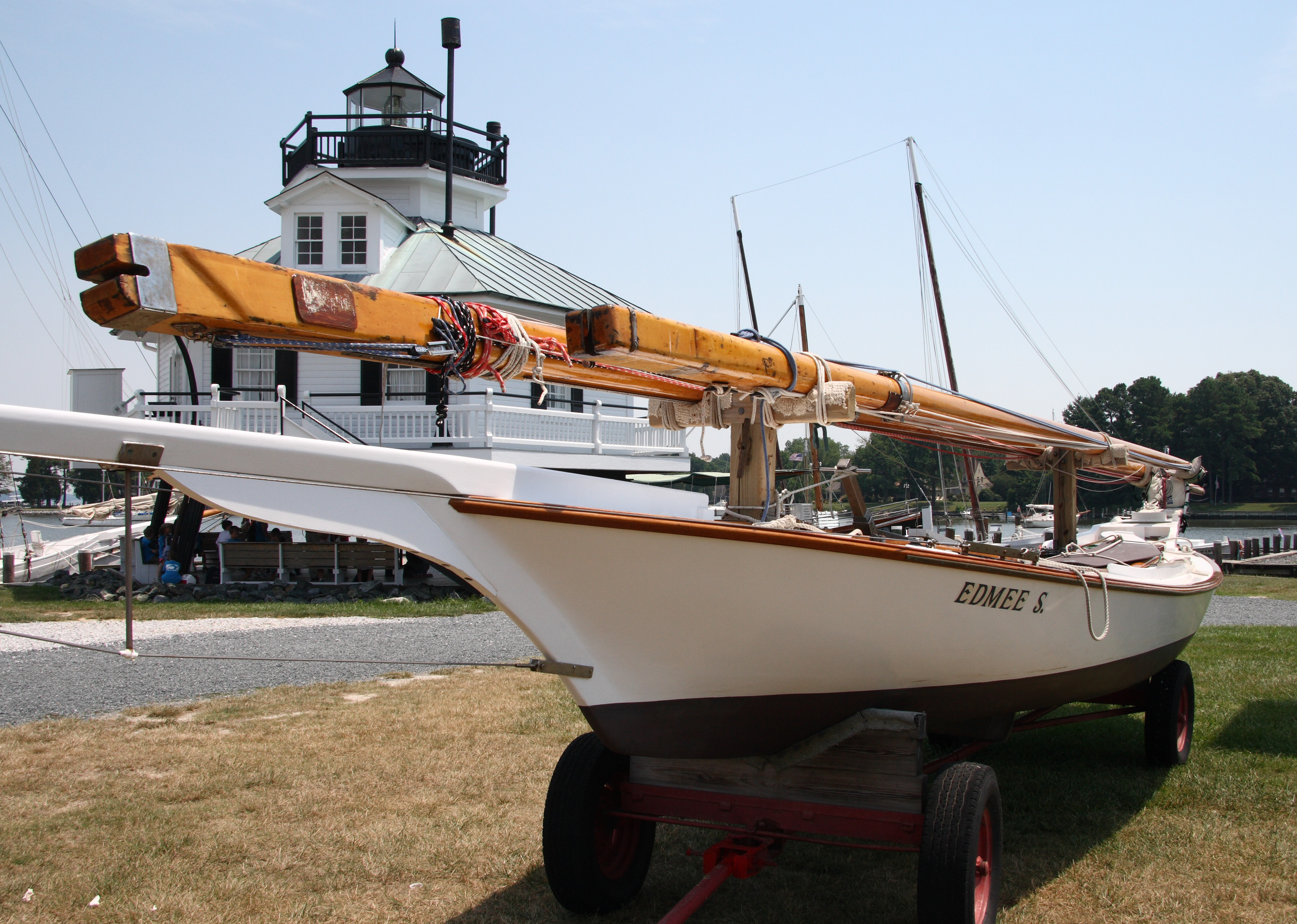
- Edmee S. on a trailer at Saint Michaels

- Location within Maryland Location within the United States
- Location: St. Michaels, Maryland
- Coordinates: 38°47′15″N 76°13′9″W
- Architect: Oliver Duke
- MPS: Chesapeake Bay Sailing Log Canoe Fleet TR
- NRHP reference No.: 85002258
- Added to NRHP: September 18, 1985

The Edmee S. is a Chesapeake Bay log canoe. She was built in the Tilghman Island style from hewn logs by Oliver Duke in the 1930s. She is one of the last 22 Chesapeake Bay racing log canoes, and is actively raced with a crew of nine to eleven people. Her original name was Cecilia Mae, but was renamed for Edmee S. Combs, whose husband funded the restoration. The hull was covered with fiberglass during the restoration. She is owned by the Chesapeake Bay Maritime Museum in Saint Michaels, Maryland and currently skippered by Marshall Patterson.
