= Otwell (Oxford, Maryland) =

Historic house in Maryland, United States

- U.S. National Register of Historic Places
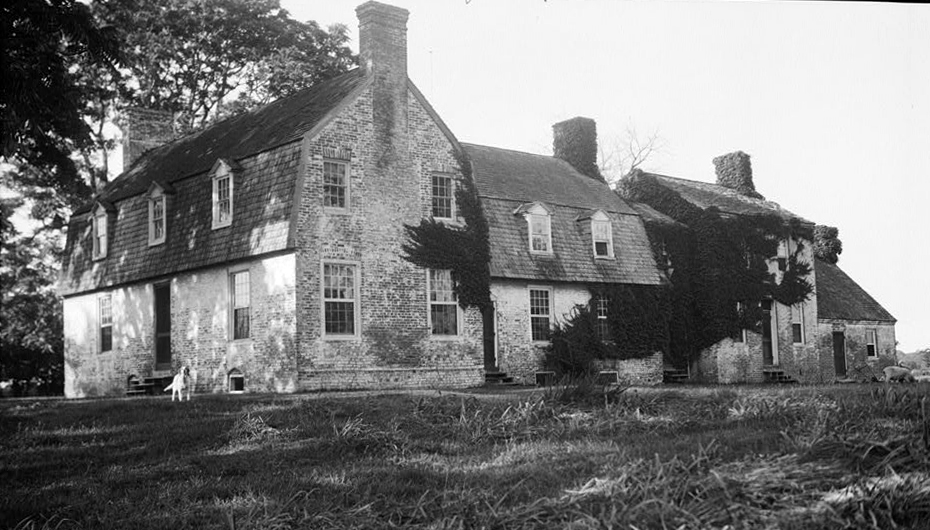

- Location within Maryland Location within the United States
- Location: Otwell Road, Oxford, Maryland
- Coordinates: 38°41′55″N 76°8′16″W
- Area: 37 acres (15 ha)
- Built: 1725
- NRHP reference No.: 82002819
- Added to NRHP: March 15, 1982

Otwell is a historic home at Oxford, Talbot County, Maryland. It is a brick house composed of two major parts, the first constructed around 1720–1730, and the other part around 1800–1810. The earliest portion of the building consists of the westerly gambrel roofed structure with a T-shaped plan. At the base of the "T" are appended three small sections with varying roof lines, constructed in the first decade of the 19th century. The interior retains the original floor plan but the decorative detailing was extensively restored following a fire in 1958.

It was listed on the National Register of Historic Places in 1982.
