= Clay's Hope =

Historic house in Maryland, United States

- U.S. National Register of Historic Places
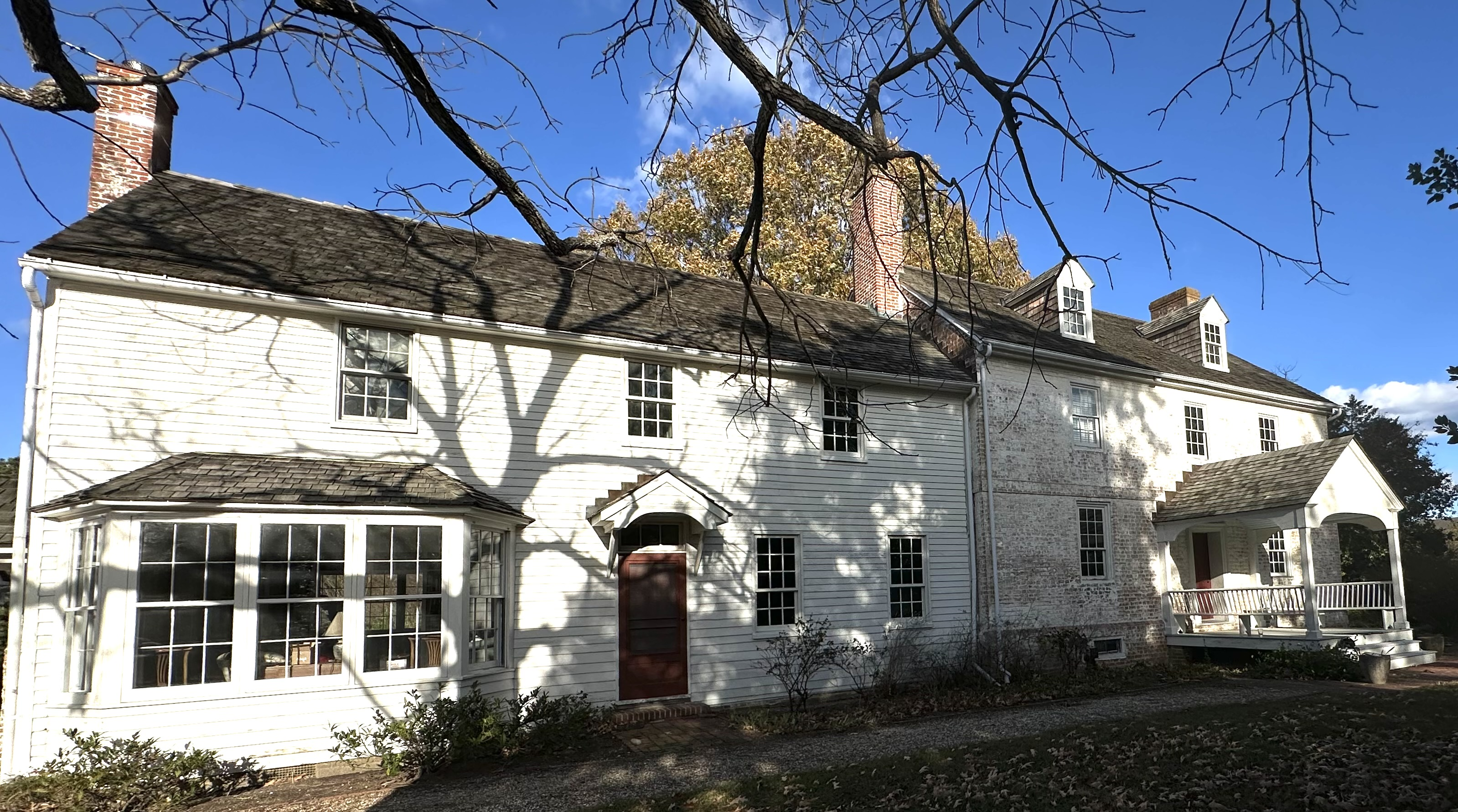

- Location within Maryland Location within the United States
- Location: Bellevue Rd. Bellevue, Maryland
- Coordinates: 38°42′25″N 76°11′17″W
- Area: 37.3 acres (15.1 ha)
- Built: 1783
- NRHP reference No.: 79001142
- Added to NRHP: October 31, 1979

Clay's Hope is a historic home in Bellevue, Talbot County, Maryland, United States. It is a 2 1/2-story, 3-bay Flemish bond brick house with the gable roof, built around 1783. Also standing on the property is an array of outbuildings including the last known tobacco house to survive in Talbot County; a frame structure built around 1800. Other structures include a smokehouse-like frame structure built as an implement storage building and an early-19th-century gable-roofed structure with built-in seats that has been converted into a gazebo. A small Harrison family cemetery is also on the property.

Clay's Hope was listed on the National Register of Historic Places in 1979.
