= Magic (log canoe) =

- MAGIC (log canoe)
- U.S. National Register of Historic Places
- Location within Maryland Location within the United States
- Location: St. Michaels Marina, St. Michaels, Maryland
- Coordinates: 38°47′6″N 76°13′13″W
- Built: 1894
- Architect: Tarr, Charles
- Architectural style: Tilghman
- MPS: Chesapeake Bay Sailing Log Canoe Fleet TR
- NRHP reference No.: 85002260
- Added to NRHP: September 18, 1985

The Magic is a Chesapeake Bay log canoe, built in 1894, by Charles Tarr in St. Michaels, Maryland, She measures 34'-3 5/8" long with a beam of 6'-11". She served as a commercial oystering vessel until 1924 when she was returned to her sailing rig. After her conversion Magic proved to be one of the fastest canoes on the Bay, winning the first Governor's Cup race in 1927. She one of the last 22 surviving traditional Chesapeake Bay racing log canoes that carry on a tradition of racing on the Eastern Shore of Maryland that has existed since the 1840s. She is located at St. Michaels, Talbot County, Maryland.

She was listed on the National Register of Historic Places in 1985.
