= Annapolis Summer Garden Theatre =

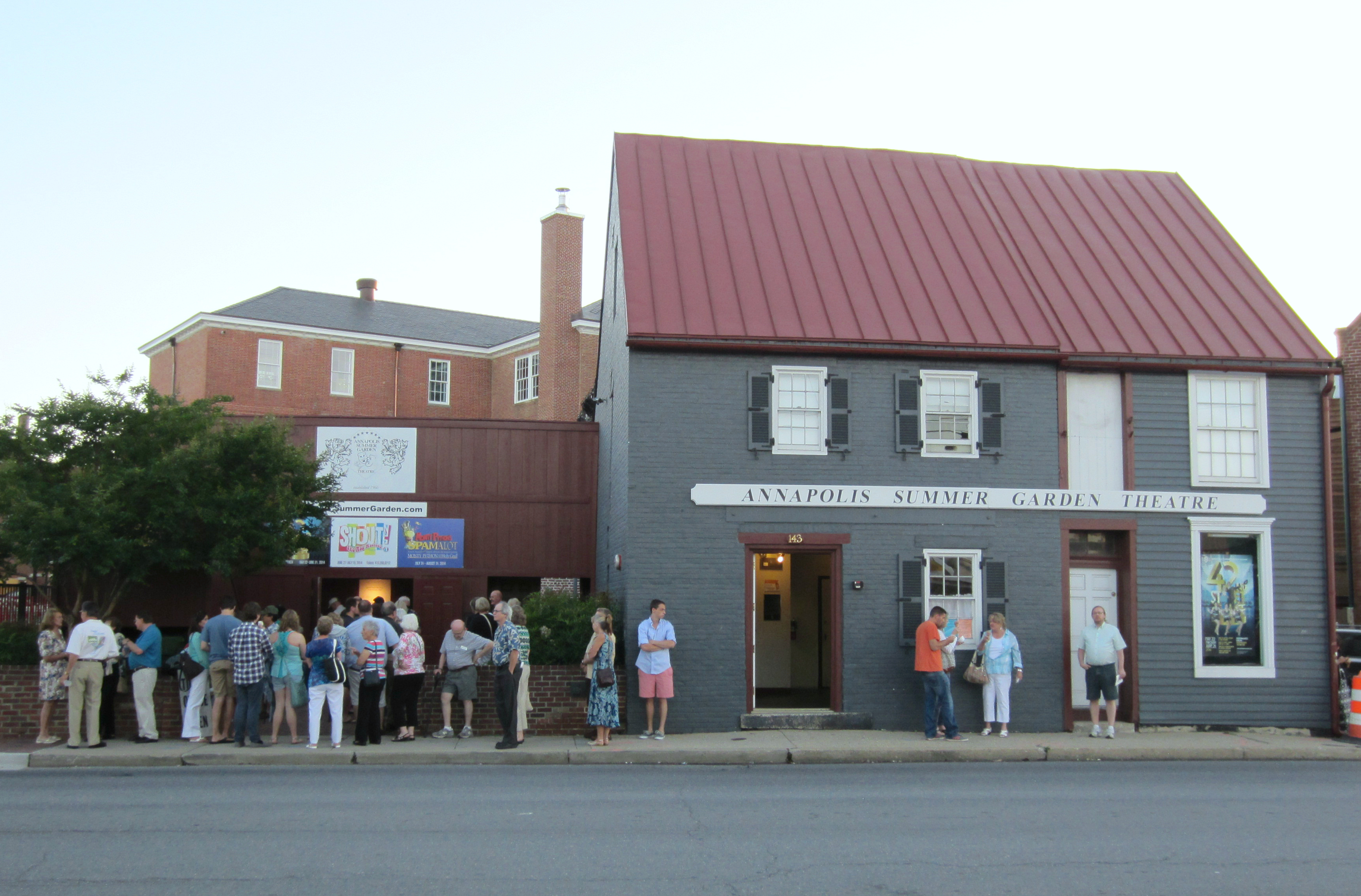
Exterior of ASGT's historic theatre building on Compromise Street at the Annapolis City Dock. June 2014.

Annapolis Summer Garden Theatre (ASGT) is a nonprofit community theatre in downtown Annapolis, Maryland. Founded in 1966, the group produces musical theatre every summer at its historic outdoor venue at the Annapolis City Dock, covering three shows in a season. Performances take place on Thursdays, Fridays, Saturdays, and Sundays at 8:30 pm between Memorial Day and Labor Day.

The group's mission is "[t]o provide opportunities for the community to learn about and experience live theatre under the stars." ASGT is led by a volunteer board of directors and has no paid staff.
