= S. C. Dobson (log canoe) =

- S. C. DOBSON (log canoe)
- U.S. National Register of Historic Places
- Location within Maryland Location within the United States
- Nearest city: Oxford, Maryland
- Coordinates: 38°41′34″N 76°9′33″W
- Built: 1895
- Architect: Lowery, James
- Architectural style: Tilghman
- MPS: Chesapeake Bay Sailing Log Canoe Fleet TR
- NRHP reference No.: 85002252
- Added to NRHP: September 18, 1985

The S. C. Dobson is a Chesapeake Bay log canoe, built about 1895, by James Lowery at Tilghman, Maryland. She measures 33'-1 3/4" (10.1 meters) and has a beam of 6'-6 1/2" (2 meters). She has a longhead bow, a sharp stern, and a narrow, straight-sided hull. With a Tilghman racing rig she races under No. 6. She one of the last 22 surviving traditional Chesapeake Bay racing log canoes that carry on a tradition of racing on the Eastern Shore of Maryland that has existed since the 1840s.

Since the 1990s, she has been named the Mary Julia Hall. She is located at Chestertown, Kent County, Maryland.

She was listed on the National Register of Historic Places in 1985.
