= Persistence (log canoe) =

- PERSISTENCE (log canoe)
- U.S. National Register of Historic Places
- Location within Maryland Location within the United States
- Location: St. Michaels Marina, St. Michaels, Maryland
- Coordinates: 38°47′6″N 76°13′13″W
- Architect: Harrison, John B.
- Architectural style: Tilghman
- MPS: Chesapeake Bay Sailing Log Canoe Fleet TR
- NRHP reference No.: 85002261
- Added to NRHP: September 18, 1985

The Persistence is a Chesapeake Bay log canoe, built in the 1890s, possibly by John B. Harrison in Tilghman, Maryland. She measures 32'-4 1/2" long, with a beam of 6'-11 1/2" and is double-ended with no longhead on her bow. She is one of the last 22 surviving traditional Chesapeake Bay racing log canoes that carry on a tradition of racing on the Eastern Shore of Maryland that has existed since the 1840s. She is located at St. Michaels, Talbot County, Maryland.

She was listed on the National Register of Historic Places in 1985.
