= Noddy (log canoe) =

- NODDY (log canoe)
- U.S. National Register of Historic Places
- Location within Maryland Location within the United States
- Nearest city: St. Michaels, Maryland
- Coordinates: 38°48′5″N 76°13′17″W
- Built: 1930
- Architect: Duke, Oliver
- Architectural style: Tilghman
- MPS: Chesapeake Bay Sailing Log Canoe Fleet TR
- NRHP reference No.: 85002257
- Added to NRHP: September 18, 1985

The Noddy is a Chesapeake Bay log canoe, built in 1930, by Oliver Duke in Royal Oak, Maryland, She measures 27'-6" long, with a beam of 6'-4 1/2". Her log hull remains unglassed, is painted white, and she races under No. 1. She one of the last 22 surviving traditional Chesapeake Bay racing log canoes that carry on a tradition of racing on the Eastern Shore of Maryland that has existed since the 1840s. In 1985 she was located at St. Michaels, Talbot County, Maryland.

She was overhauled in 1999. She is located at Chestertown, Kent County, Maryland.

She was listed on the National Register of Historic Places in 1985.
