= Jena (Oxford, Maryland) =

Historic house in Maryland, United States

- U.S. National Register of Historic Places
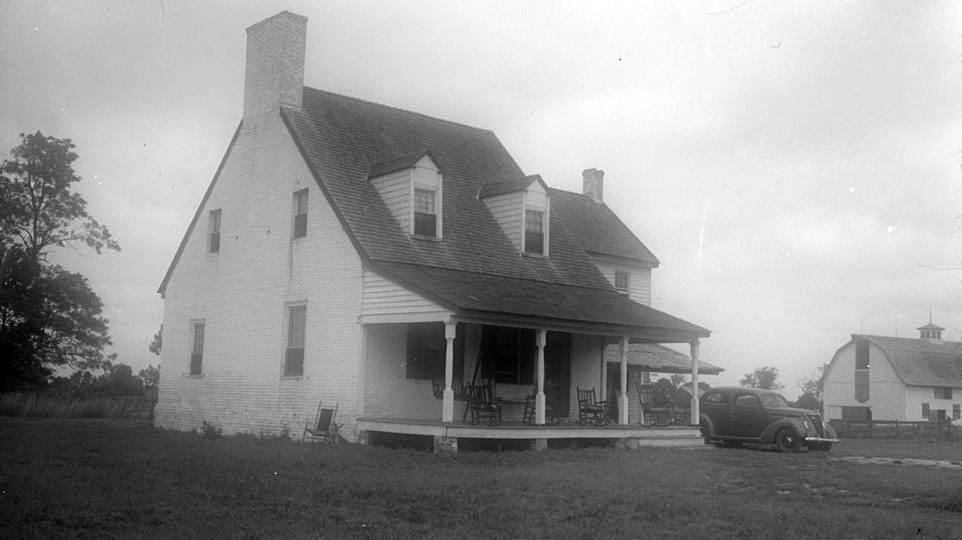

- Location within Maryland Location within the United States
- Location: Peach Blossom Road (MD 333), Oxford, Maryland
- Coordinates: 38°41′17″N 76°8′18″W
- Area: 2.8 acres (1.1 ha)
- Built: 1800
- NRHP reference No.: 80001838
- Added to NRHP: August 6, 1980

Jena is a historic home in Oxford, Talbot County, Maryland. It is a 1 1/2-story brick structure with 19th- and 20th-century additions. It is faced in Flemish bond and distinguished by its first-story 9/6 windows with unusual canted and paneled reveals.

It was listed on the National Register of Historic Places in 1980.
