= Rover (log canoe) =

- ROVER (log canoe)
- U.S. National Register of Historic Places
- Location within Maryland Location within the United States
- Location: St. Michaels Marina, St. Michaels, Maryland
- Coordinates: 38°47′6″N 76°13′13″W
- Built: 1886
- Architect: Thompson Bros.
- Architectural style: Tilghman
- MPS: Chesapeake Bay Sailing Log Canoe Fleet TR
- NRHP reference No.: 85002262
- Added to NRHP: September 18, 1985

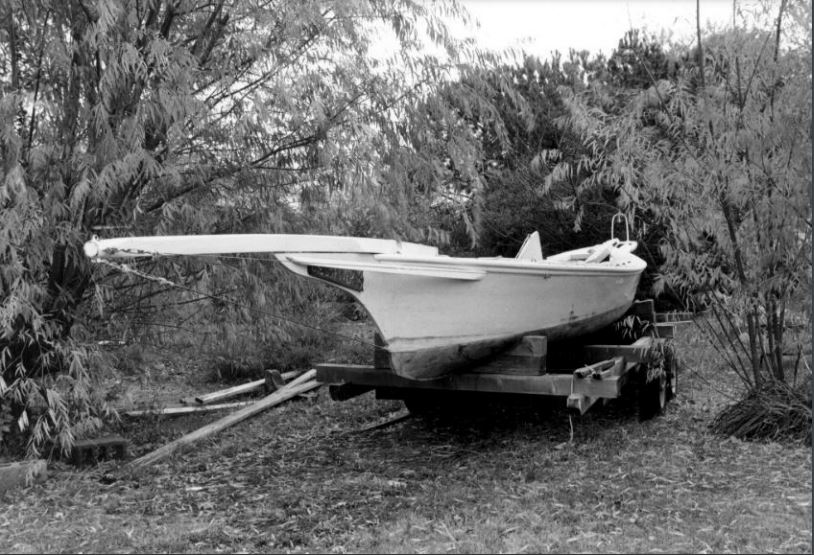

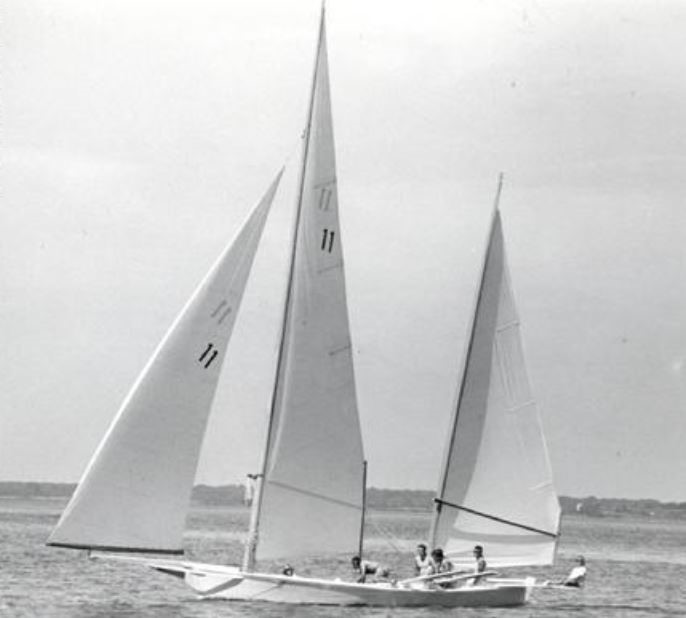
Rover Sailing

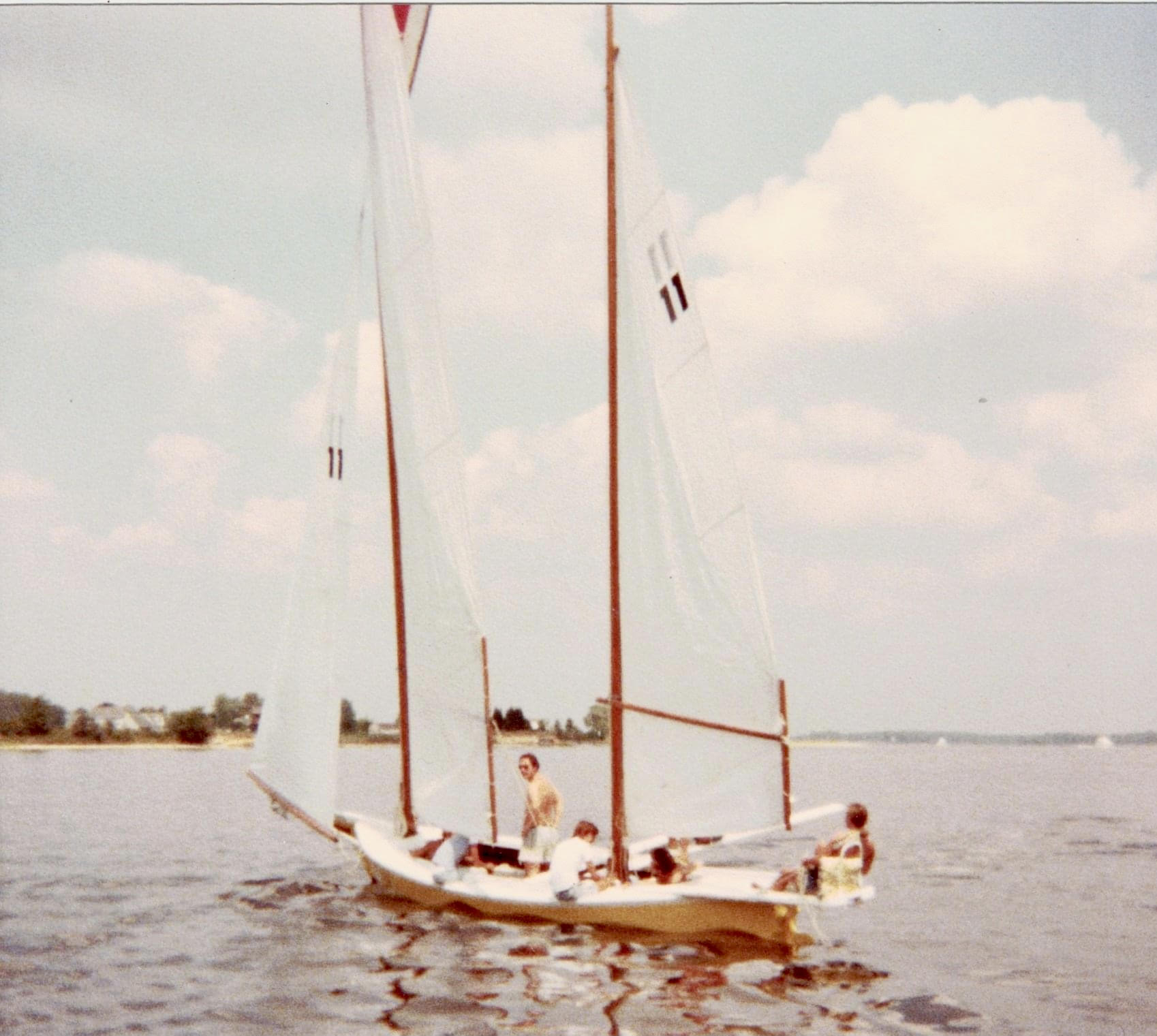

Rover is a Chesapeake Bay log canoe, built in 1886 by the Thompson brothers in Chester, Maryland. She measures 28'-1 3/4" with a 6'-4 1/4" beam. She has a longhead bow, braced back to the hull, and a sharp stern. She is privately owned and races under No. 11 in Eastern Shore competition. She is one of the last 22 surviving traditional Chesapeake Bay racing log canoes that carry on a tradition of racing on the Eastern Shore of Maryland that has existed since the 1840s. She is located at St. Michaels, Talbot County, Maryland.

She was listed on the National Register of Historic Places in 1985.

From: Tradition, Speed and Grace: Chesapeake Bay Sailing Log Canoes by John C. North II. Chesapeake Bay Maritime Museum, 2018.

"According to Bobbie Marshall of St. Michaels, she and her late husband, Marion C. “Junior” Marshall, purchased Rover in 1961 from Charles Grimes of Stevensville, Maryland. Grimes stated that the canoe was constructed about 1886 by the Thompson Brothers of Chester, Maryland, who also built Silver Heel. Rover was constructed as a workboat, and a motor was installed in her in 1902.

She was in terrible condition when acquired and was extensively rebuilt by Marshall and raced by him for the first time on Labor Day 1972. She was the only canoe in the fleet to be painted yellow.

Rover was poorly equipped for spars and sails and never won a race. She was known to capsize with some frequency and was called “rollover Rover.”

Her chief claim to fame was that she went to Washington, D.C., in 1976 to participate in the American Folklife Festival on the steps of the American Museum of Natural History. She was there for a week with crew members on hand to explain the wonders of a Chesapeake log canoe to the inquiring public."
