= Barnaby House =

Historic house in Maryland

- U.S. National Register of Historic Places
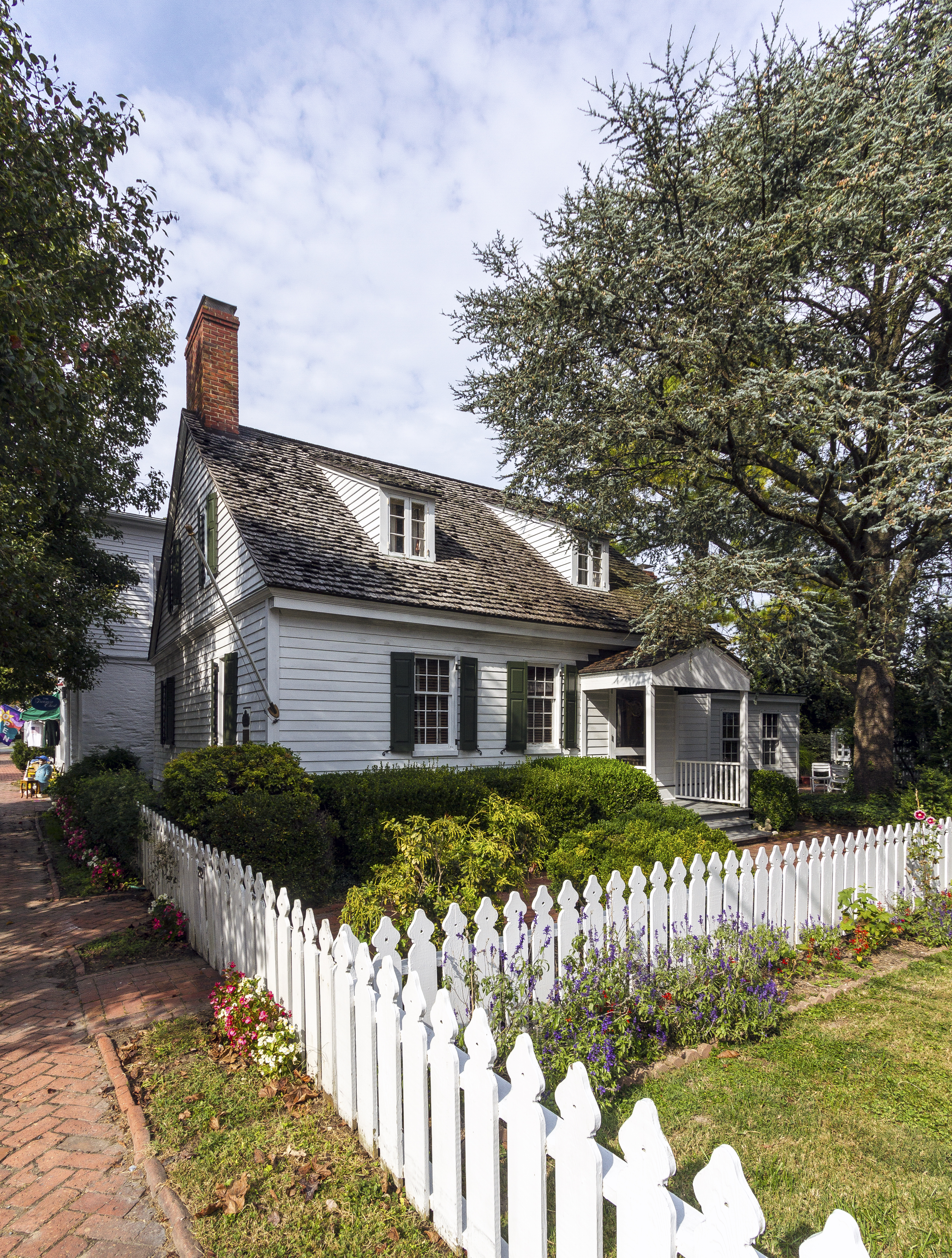
- Barnaby House, September 2012

- Location within Maryland Location within the United States
- Location: 212 N. Morris St., Oxford, Maryland
- Coordinates: 38°41′26.93″N 76°10′24.68″W
- Area: less than one acre
- Built: 1770
- Architectural style: Colonial
- NRHP reference No.: 92001228
- Added to NRHP: November 24, 1992

Barnaby House is a historic home in Oxford, Talbot County, Maryland, United States. It is a 1 1/2-story, side-hall / double-pile frame house erected in 1770. It features a steeply pitched wood shingle roof marked by two shed-roofed dormers and a single-story brick-ended kitchen wing. It is one of only three 18th-century buildings remaining in Oxford.

Barnaby House was listed on the National Register of Historic Places in 1992.
