= Sandy (log canoe) =

- SANDY (log canoe)
- U.S. National Register of Historic Places
- Location within Maryland Location within the United States
- Location: Sherwood Rd., Sherwood, Maryland
- Coordinates: 38°45′40″N 76°19′9″W
- Architectural style: Tilghman
- MPS: Chesapeake Bay Sailing Log Canoe Fleet TR
- NRHP reference No.: 85002253
- Added to NRHP: September 18, 1985

The Sandy is a Chesapeake Bay log canoe. She is a 28'-1 1/4" long sailing log canoe with two masts and a racing rig. Log-built, with carvel-fitted rising planks, the boat has a beam of 6'-8 1/4". She is one of the last 22 surviving traditional Chesapeake Bay racing log canoes, carrying on a tradition of racing on the Eastern Shore of Maryland that has existed since the 1840s. She is located at Sherwood, Talbot County, Maryland.

She was listed on the National Register of Historic Places in 1985.
