= Island Bird =

Log canoe

- ISLAND BIRD (log canoe)
- U.S. National Register of Historic Places
- Location within Maryland Location within the United States
- Nearest city: St. Michaels, Maryland
- Coordinates: 38°48′0″N 76°13′10″W
- Built: 1882
- Architect: Covington, William S.
- Architectural style: Tilghman
- MPS: Chesapeake Bay Sailing Log Canoe Fleet TR
- NRHP reference No.: 85002254
- Added to NRHP: September 18, 1985

The Island Bird is a Chesapeake Bay log canoe built in 1882 by William Sidney Covington in Tilghman, Maryland. She is a 27 ft 4 in (8.33 m) sailing log canoe with a racing rig, a sharp stem with a longhead bow, and a sharp, raking stern. She is one of the smallest boats in the active racing fleet, with a beam of only 5 ft 6.5 in (1.689 m). The boat is privately owned by the descendants of Mr. Covington and has been racing every season since 1949. She is one of the last 22 surviving traditional Chesapeake Bay racing log canoes that carry on a tradition of racing on the Eastern Shore of Maryland that has existed since the 1840s. She is located in St. Michaels, Talbot County, Maryland.

She was listed on the National Register of Historic Places in 1985.
