= Chesapeake Bay Maritime Museum =

Museum in St. Michaels, Maryland

Coordinates: 38.787343°N 76.220229°W

Hooper Strait Lighthouse

The Chesapeake Bay Maritime Museum is located in St. Michaels, Maryland, United States and is home to a collection of Chesapeake Bay artifacts, exhibitions, and vessels. This 18-acre (73,000 m^{2}) interactive museum was founded in 1965 on Navy Point, once a site of seafood packing houses, docks, and work boats. Today, the museum houses the world's largest collection of Chesapeake Bay boats and provides interactive exhibits in and around the 35 buildings which dot the campus. The museum also offers year-round educational seminars and workshops.

== History ==
First opened to the public in 1965 the Chesapeake Bay Maritime Museum, was a project of the Historical Society of Talbot County, which acquired three waterfront houses along St. Michaels Harbor. Within the first few years, the museum acquired historic watercraft and exhibited them afloat, notably the oyster sloop J. T. Leonard in 1966 and the log-bottom bugeye Edna E. Lockwood the following year. Adjacent land became available as seafood industries began closing on Navy Point, and the museum acquired land from the former Coulbourne and Jewett crab and oyster packing house in 1966. By the end of the year, the Hooper Strait Lighthouse, which had been threatened by demolition, was moved to the newly acquired parcel. It opened to the public the following May. By 1971, all of the former industrial land of Navy Point had been acquired by the museum. In 1968, Chesapeake Bay Maritime Museum incorporated as an independent nonprofit corporation under article 501(c)3 of the IRS code. The museum hired its first permanent director, R. J. "Jim" Holt in 1971, who set the museum on a course for expansion and professionalization. In 1976, under Holt's leadership, the museum acquired adjacent acreage fronting Fogg's Cove, and in 1978, the institution was first accredited by the American Association of Museums (now American Alliance of Museums). Too deteriorated for the fledgling museum to save, the J. T. Leonard sank and was cut up in 1974, but the vessel's plight emphasized the need to create the infrastructure to maintain floating exhibits, so a traditional marine railway was constructed in 1974 and a boat shop in 1977. A major four-year restoration rebuilt the Edna E. Lockwood, from her original nine logs, and the vessel was relaunched in 1979. New purpose-built exhibition buildings were added, including the Waterfowling on the Chesapeake building (1975), Bay of the Chesapeake building (1980), and Steamboat building (1990). Beginning in the 1980s, the museum acquired several small historic structures, most notably Mitchell House, former home of Eliza Bailey Mitchell, sister to Frederick Douglass, and located them in the field fronting Fogg's Cove. By the time Jim Holt retired at the end of 1987, the museum had grown to a collection of historic structures and multiple exhibition buildings along a 17-acre waterfront campus.

His successor, John R. Valliant, led the museum through further growth, including a library, Oystering Building, and At Play on the Bay building, the latter two products of a $17.2 million capital campaign. His tenure also saw the marked expansion of the museum's programming, from resident scholars whose original research supported new publications, exhibitions and curricula to yearlong boat yard apprentices and a groundbreaking Apprentice for a Day drop-in weekend boatbuilding class. Also created during Valliant's tenure was the Academy for Lifelong Learning, which offers peer-taught classes. Valliant also dramatically expanded the museum's collections, from the purchase of the Downes Curtis sailmaking tools (1997) to the acquisition of a major group of artworks by Baltimore marine artist Louis Feuchter (1885-1957) and the Robert H. Burgess collection of maritime objects, manuscripts, and photographs (2006).

Valliant retired in 2006 and was succeeded by Stuart Parnes, who transformed the bulkheading of Fogg's Cove into a living shoreline and led other environmental initiatives. Beginning in 2009, his successor, Langley Shook, rebuilt the museum's finances following the downturn in the economy, while overseeing a major restoration of the 1955 skipjack Rosie Parks and acquisition of the historic 1920 buy boat Winnie Estelle, which replaced the buy boat replica Mister Jim for taking passengers on tours of the Miles River. Shook retired in 2014 and was succeeded by Kristen Greenaway, who expanded the museum's special exhibitions program beginning with A Broad Reach: Fifty Years of Collecting to mark the museum's 50th anniversary in 2015. She led an initiative to correct deferred maintenance on museum facilities, which included work on the Hooper Strait Lighthouse and repointing of the brick work on Dodson House, one of the museum's first three structures, now used for administrative offices. She also oversaw the museum's second major restoration of the bugeye Edna E. Lockwood beginning in 2016.

== Exhibits ==
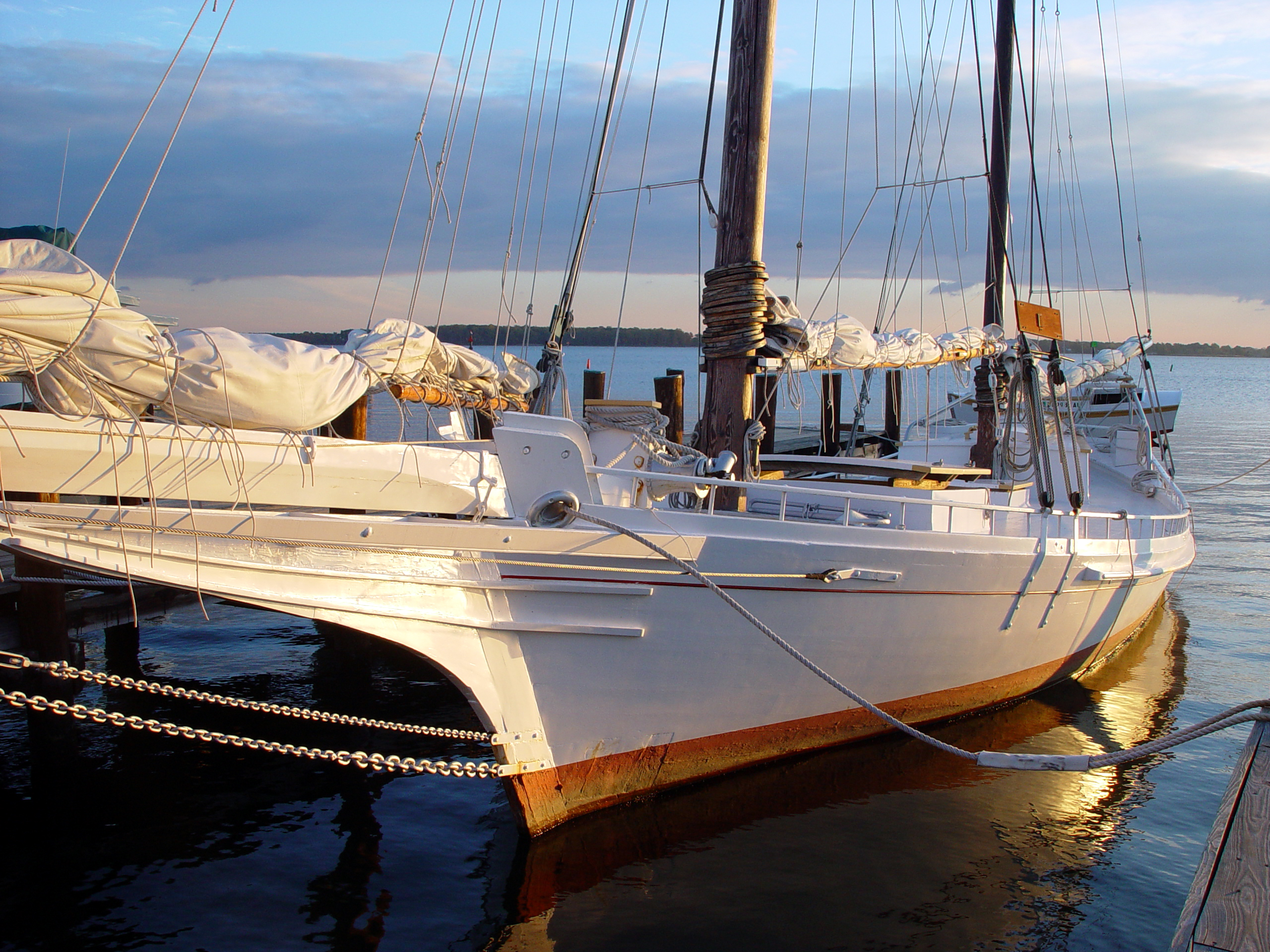
Log-bottom Bugeye

The Chesapeake Bay Maritime Museum tells the geological, economic, and social stories of the Bay and those that lived there. Museum visitors can view over 100 boats and boat models, various artworks including a vast collection of watercolors, decoys, guns, ship's signboards, and other historical Bay artifacts. Larger structures include Tilghman Island’s original Knapps Narrows drawbridge and the 1879 Hooper Strait Chesapeake screw-pile lighthouse. At the museum’s working boatyard, visitors can have their hand at constructing a wooden skiff through the Apprentice for a Day program (see below). One of the interactive exhibits the museum offers is Waterman's Wharf, where one can practice seafood harvesting by hauling an eel or crab pot out of the waters of Fogg Cove. Another exhibit, Oystering on the Chesapeake, transports visitors to the deck of a working waterman, and explains how the oyster industry has shaped the region’s landscape, culture, and history.

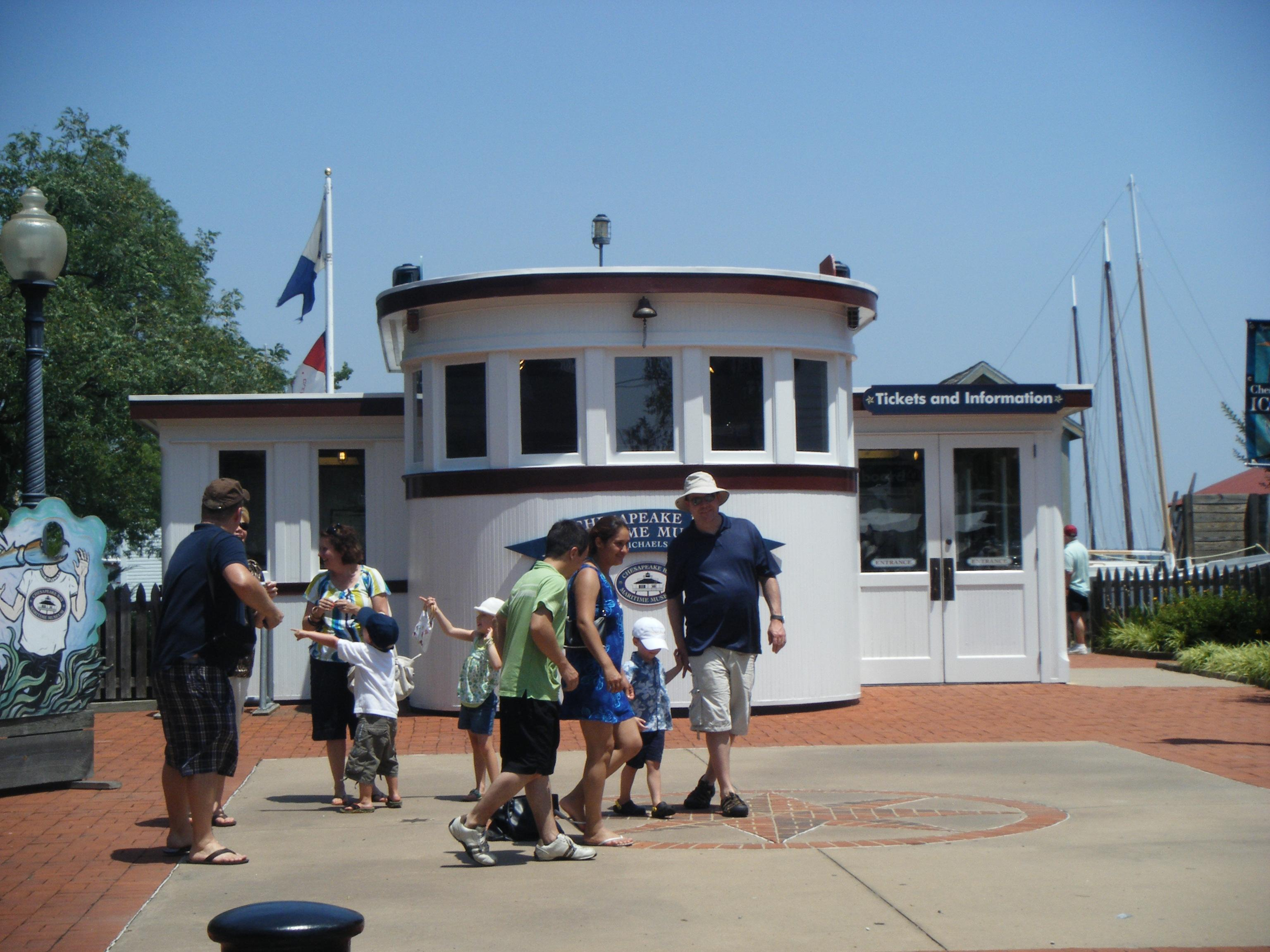
Entrance to Chesapeake Bay Maritime Museum.

The Floating Fleet is one of the most popular exhibits offered. This collection of water vessels docked at Navy Point includes Edna E. Lockwood, a National Historic Landmark, and the last sailing log-bottom bugeye. The museum helps keep the Chesapeake Bay log canoe racing tradition alive through preserving and sailing the Edmee S., the museum’s own log racing canoe, which is crewed and raced by Museum staff on weekends in the summer. The dredgeboat Old Point, built from seven logs in 1909, was once used to haul fresh fish in the winter, carry oysters during the fall, and dredge clams during the summer. Today, it offers kids a hands on and onboard "waterman" experience. Mister Jim, the museum's replica buy boat, takes museum visitors out on the water for tours of the Bay throughout summer weekends. Through the variety of exhibits, the museum provides the opportunity for all to experience the history and culture of the Chesapeake Bay region.

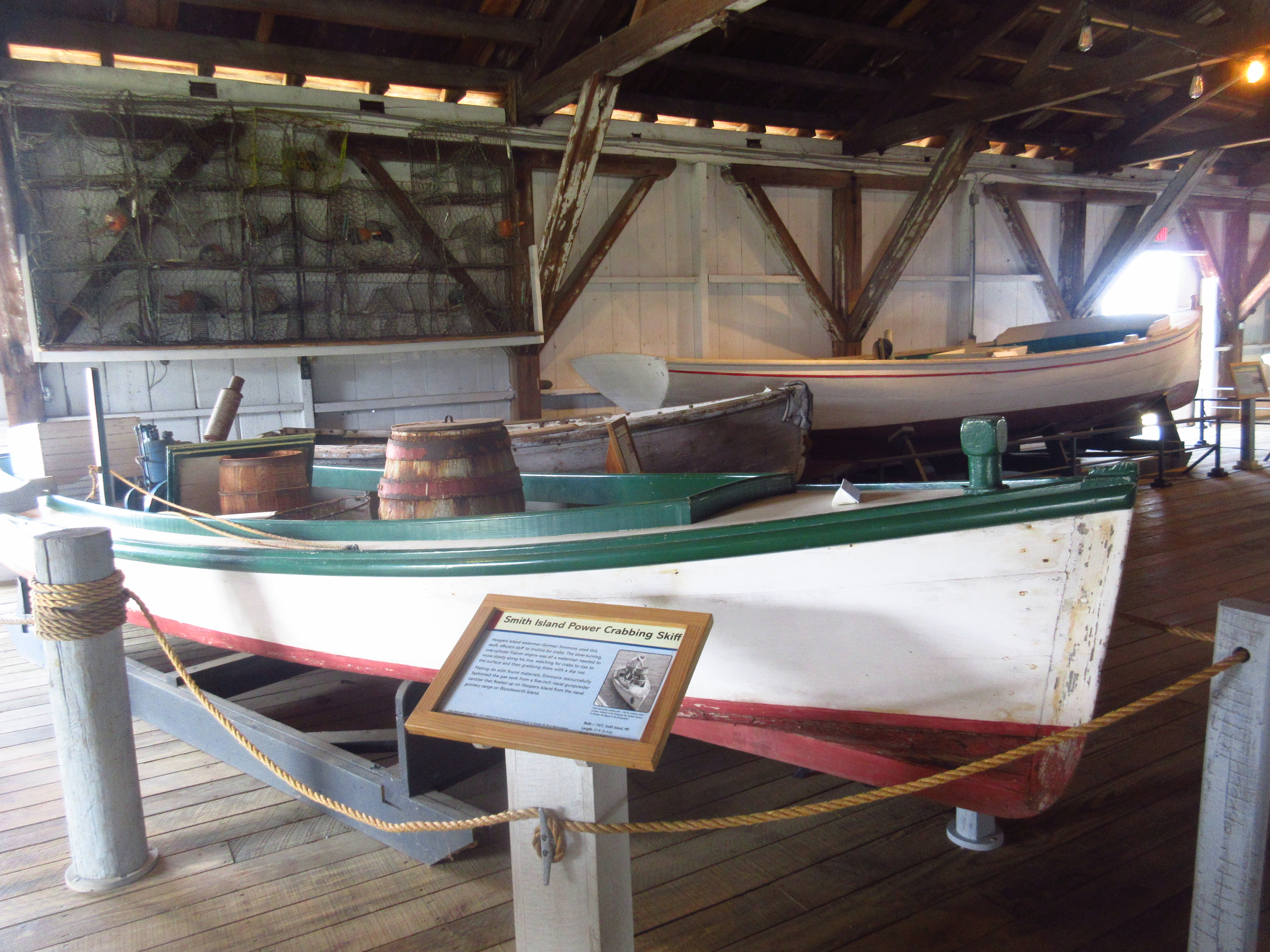
Crabbing skiff from Smith Island.

During the COVID-19 pandemic the museum opened a digital exhibit to allow the public access to the institution remotely. Island Life: Changing Cultures, Changing Shorelines is a photography exhibition that details the effects climate change are having in and around the Chesapeake Bay. Themes explore rapid climate change, shore erosion, and environmentally motivated community displacement.

== Education and outreach ==
CBMM offers field trips for students in grades PreK through college, emphasizing topics including history, geography, and the ecology of the Chesapeake Bay. A bus scholarship program helps visiting school groups with the cost of transportation. The Lighthouse Overnight Program allows children to experience the life of a mariner standing watch overnight. The museum also provides programs for children such as Sea Squirts Summer Camp, as well as hands-on games, crafts, and storytelling throughout the year. For adults, the museum's programs include a Lecture Series, Adult-Guided Tours, and the Academy for Lifelong Learning, a series of courses centered on continuing learning inside the classroom and beyond. In addition to a variety of programs, the museum offers a 10,800-volume library of ship plans, manuscripts, books, and sketches.

== Working boatyard ==
The museum has a working boatyard for restoration projects and education. Visitors can learn about the restoration of commercial skipjacks and the preservation of the museum's own floating fleet. The "Apprentice for a Day" program allows visitors to help construct a wooden skiff under the guidance of boatyard staff members.

== See also ==
- List of maritime museums in the United States
- List of museum ships
