= Orem's Delight =

Historic house in Maryland, United States

- U.S. National Register of Historic Places
- Location within Maryland Location within the United States
- Location: Ferry Neck Road, Bellevue, Maryland
- Coordinates: 38°41′10″N 76°12′11″W
- Area: 2 acres (0.81 ha)
- Built: 1725
- Built by: Orem, Morris
- NRHP reference No.: 78001477
- Added to NRHP: April 4, 1978

Orem's Delight is a historic home at Bellevue, Talbot County, Maryland, United States. The house, which was built about 1725, is a 20-by-25-foot, 1 1/2-story brick structure with an interior chimney. It is one of the few small 18th-century structures to have survived without incorporation into a larger dwelling.

Orem's Delight was listed on the National Register of Historic Places in 1978.
