= Bellevue, Maryland =

Unincorporated community in Maryland, U.S.

Coordinates: 38°42′12″N 76°11′04″W

Bellevue is an unincorporated community in Talbot County, Maryland, United States.

Bellevue lies on the north bank of the Tred Avon River, and is linked to Oxford across the river via the Oxford–Bellevue Ferry. Clay's Hope and Orem's Delight are listed on the National Register of Historic Places.
