= Rock Clift =

Historic house in Maryland, US

- U.S. National Register of Historic Places
- Location within Maryland Location within the United States
- Location: Discovery Drive, Matthews, Maryland
- Coordinates: 38°48′12″N 75°56′37″W
- Area: 5 acres (2.0 ha)
- Built: 1785
- NRHP reference No.: 80001837
- Added to NRHP: July 30, 1980

Rock Clift, or High Banks, is a historic home at Matthews, Talbot County, Maryland, United States. It is a two-story, three-bay Flemish bond brick house with dormers and has a one-story four-bay frame addition that was built in two sections. The brick house appears to date from about the 1780s.

Rock Clift was listed on the National Register of Historic Places in 1980.
