= Matthews, Maryland =

Unincorporated community in Maryland, U.S.

Coordinates: 38°48′58″N 75°57′10″W

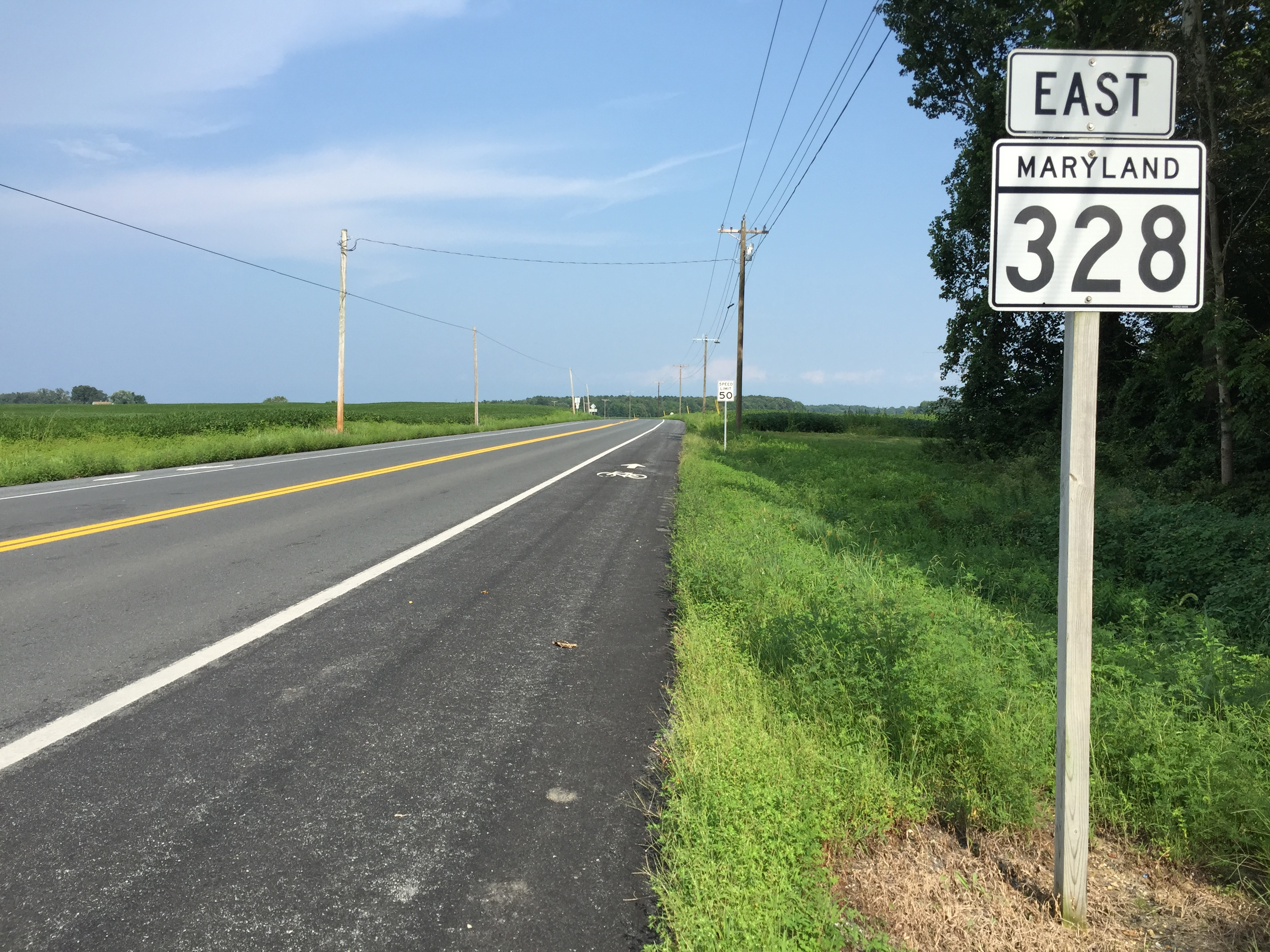
Maryland State Highway 328 looking outside Matthews. Maryland State Highway 328 looking into Matthews.

Matthews is an unincorporated community in Talbot County, Maryland, United States. Rock Clift was listed on the National Register of Historic Places in 1980.
