= Jay Dee (log canoe) =

- JAY DEE (log canoe)
- U.S. National Register of Historic Places
- Location within Maryland Location within the United States
- Nearest city: St. Michaels, Maryland
- Coordinates: 38°48′0″N 76°13′10″W
- Built: 1931
- Architect: Harrison, John B.
- Architectural style: Tilghman
- MPS: Chesapeake Bay Sailing Log Canoe Fleet TR
- NRHP reference No.: 85002256
- Added to NRHP: September 18, 1985

The Jay Dee is a Chesapeake Bay log canoe built in 1931 by John B. Harrison in Tilghman, Maryland. She is 35 feet 6 inches (10.82 m) long with a beam of 8 feet 6 inches (2.59 m), and built of five logs. She is one of the last 22 surviving traditional Chesapeake Bay racing log canoes that carry on a tradition of racing on the Eastern Shore of Maryland which has existed since the 1840s. She is located at St. Michaels, Talbot County, Maryland.

She was listed on the National Register of Historic Places in 1985.
