= Log canoe =

Type of sailboat

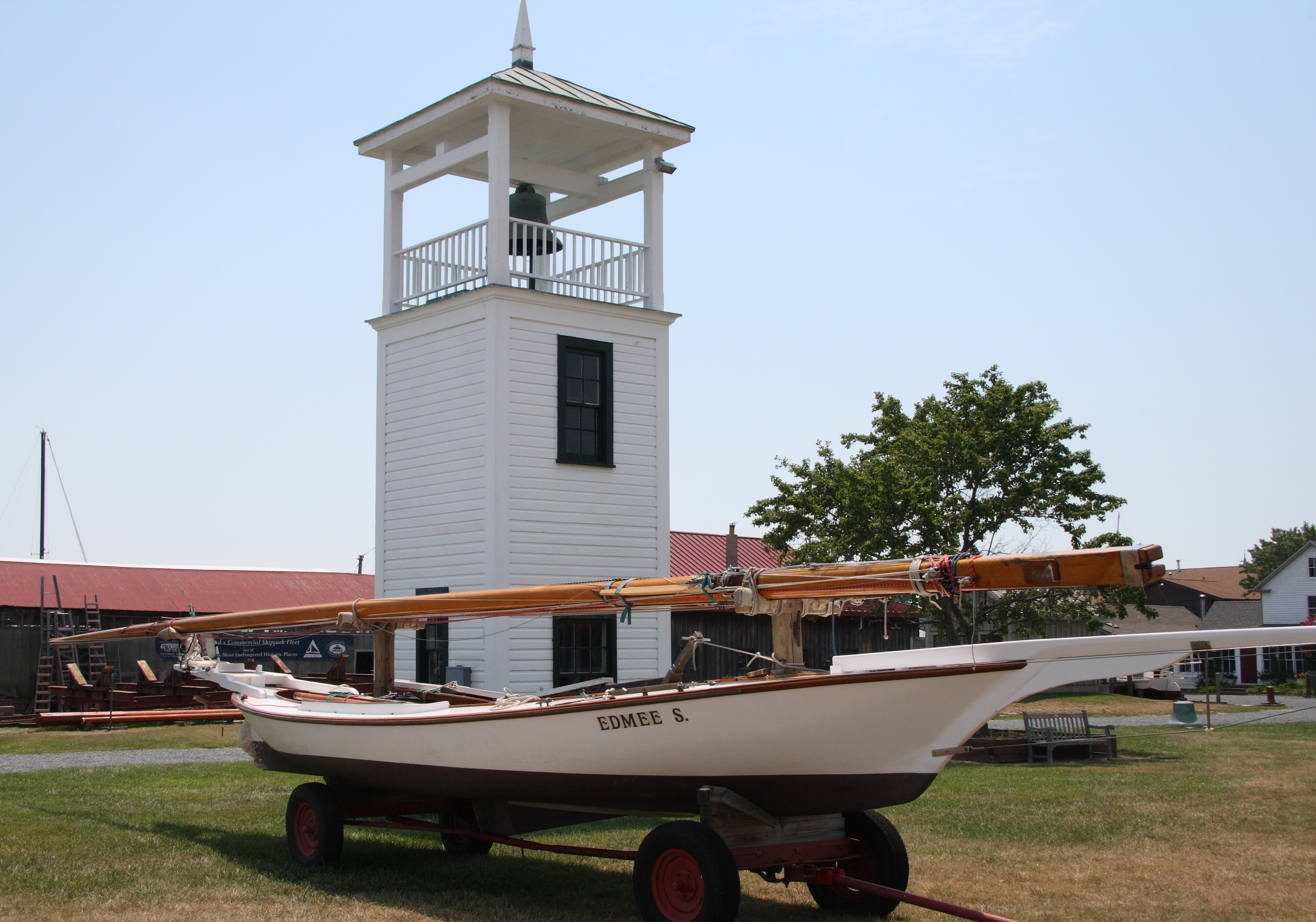
Log Canoe Edmee S. on a trailer at the Chesapeake Bay Maritime Museum with the Point Lookout Tower in the background

The log canoe is a type of sailboat developed in the Chesapeake Bay region. Based on the dugout, it was the principal traditional fishing boat of the bay until superseded by the bugeye and the skipjack. However, it is most famous as a racing sailboat, and races continue to be held.

== History ==
The history of the log canoe is closely tied to the development of the oystering industry on the bay. In pre-power days, the log canoe was an inexpensive craft which could be assembled without recourse to shipbuilders; before the dredge was made legal in 1865, the log canoe was sufficient to the needs of oyster tongers. It did not have the pulling power necessary for dredging, however, its log construction was combined with characteristics of other vessels to form the first bugeyes, a much larger and more powerful vessel. As motor power became available, watermen who were not dredging gradually abandoned sail power; also, the supplies of suitable timber were gradually exhausted. Log canoes were often converted to motor power, and new workboats (such as the Chesapeake Bay deadrise) were motored from the start and used frame construction instead of logs. Many of the existing log canoes have suffered some conversion of this sort during their lifetimes.

Over the same period, however, the ad-hoc racing of canoes evolved into a semi-formal sport, and boats began being purpose-built for racing. From 1885 onward various clubs and associations sponsored organized races. This continues to the present, and racing canoes have been built as recently as 1974.

== Hull construction ==
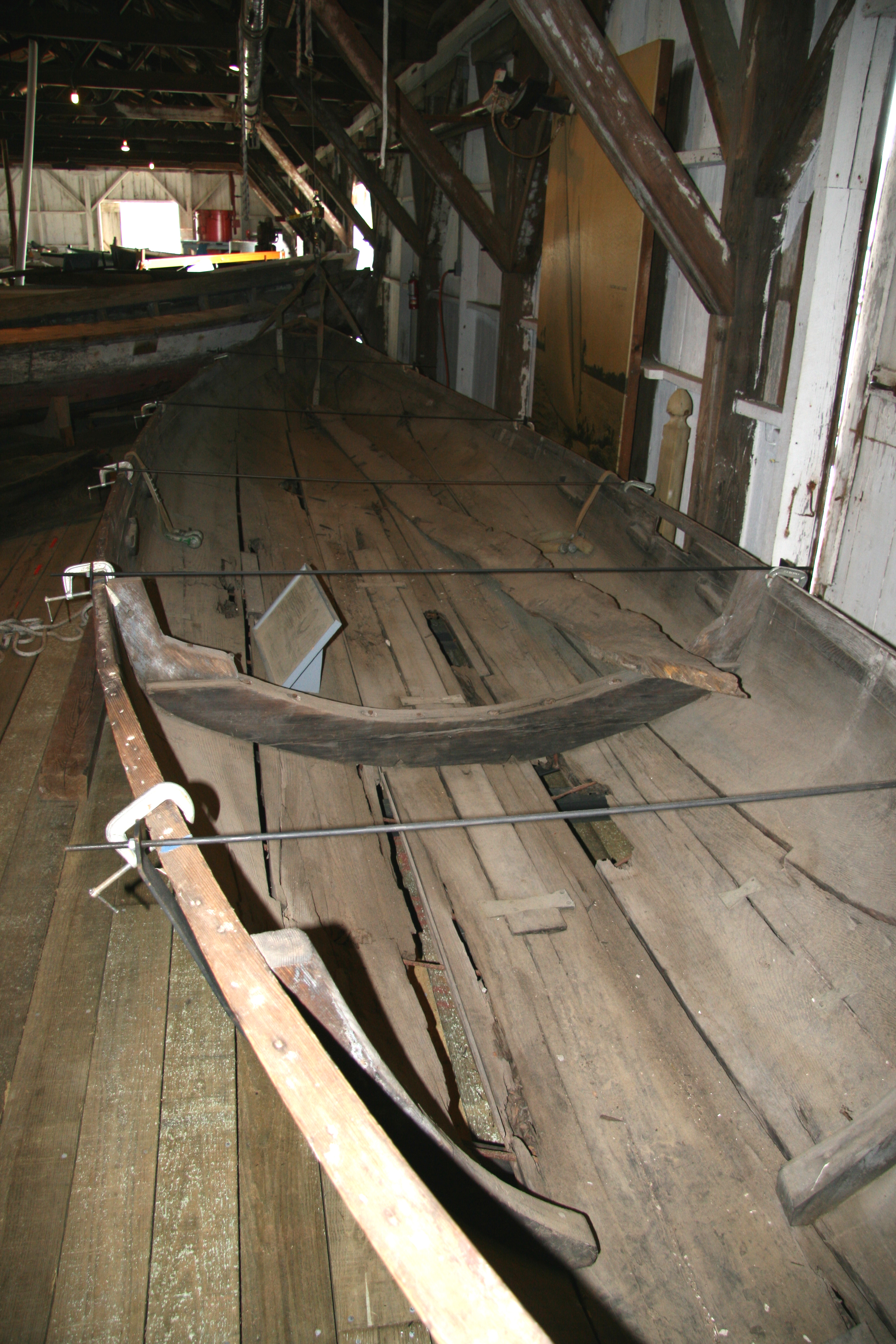
Log canoe hull showing construction, Chesapeake Bay Maritime Museum

The typical log canoe is constructed from three to nine logs joined lengthwise and carved to form the lower portion of the hull. Additional height is obtained with smaller pieces fitted together and joined to the outermost (or "wing") logs. The resulting hull is sharp-sterned and shallow, and a centerboard is added which pierces the center (keel) log.

Details of construction, particularly at the stem and stern, varied over the region. Also, Virginia boat builders did not use models, whereas most Maryland builders would start from a half-model of the hull. Surviving log canoes range in length from 27 to 35 ft. on-deck. One example is the buyboat F.D. Crockett at the Deltaville Maritime Museum in Virginia.

== Rigging ==
Rigging varied considerably.

Log canoes had one or two masts. Two-masted boats on the Chesapeake—not just log canoes—were often provided with a mast step to allow sailing with just one of the two sails.

Typical later log canoes were two-masted, vaguely resembling a modern ketch rig. The masts were always steeply raked and unstayed, and the jib was flown from a bowsprit. The rigging of the sails themselves took several characteristic and unusual forms called a triangular "sprit-boomed leg-of-mutton." The main and fore sail were not attached to the boom at the foot, but instead attached only at the clew. A tackle attached to the mast provided the force necessary to shape the sail. One advantage of the sprit boom is that the sail is self-vanging, that is, the boom does not rise or fall depending on the set of the sail. The sheeting force is less, because the sheet does not have to supply downward pull to control the boom as with a gaff-rigged boat.

This evolved further to the "goosewing" form, in which the sail became trapezoidal. The pointed clew was replaced by a vertical spar, called a club. The club attached to the aft end of the boom. This allowed for more sail area between the masts than for a triangular sail.

The rigging of the jib was similarly unusual, but followed 19th century working-boat practice. There are several terms for a jib with a boom on the foot: balanced jib, club-footed jib, and self-tending jib.

On a club-footed jib, the foot was attached on a spar, and the balance point of this spar attached to the end of the bowsprit with a line or fixture. This allowed for a larger jib which could serve as something akin to a spinnaker when running.

Working sailors were less worried about the spinnaker effect than the fact that a properly trimmed balanced jib doesn't need any quick sheeting when tacking: hence the term "self-tending."

A final characteristic feature was the use of hiking boards to keep the boat from overturning. These were long, flat boards which hooked at one end under the cockpit and stuck sideways over the opposite gunwale. Crewmembers climb out onto these boards to counterbalance the force of the sails, thus preventing the boat from heeling over. These were particularly important to racing canoes, whose sail area and lack of ballast made them hopelessly tender without such counterbalancing.

== List of log canoes on the National Register of Historic Places ==
=== Maryland ===
- Billie P. Hall, Talbot County, Maryland
- Edmee S., Talbot County, Maryland
- Flying Cloud, Talbot County, Maryland
- Island Bird, Talbot County, Maryland
- Island Blossom, Talbot County, Maryland
- Island Image, Kent County, Maryland
- Island Lark, Talbot County, Maryland
- Jay Dee, Talbot County, Maryland
- Magic, Talbot County, Maryland
- Mystery, Kent County, Maryland
- Noddy, Talbot County, Maryland
- Oliver's Gift, Anne Arundel County, Maryland
- Patricia, Dorchester County, Maryland
- Persistence, Talbot County, Maryland
- Rover, Talbot County, Maryland
- Sandy, Talbot County, Maryland
- S. C. Dobson (Mary Julia Hall), Kent County, Maryland
- Silver Heel, Kent County, Maryland
