= Flying Cloud (log canoe) =

- FLYING CLOUD (log canoe)
- U.S. National Register of Historic Places
- Location within Maryland Location within the United States
- Built: 1932
- Architect: Harrison, John B.
- Architectural style: Tilghman
- MPS: Chesapeake Bay Sailing Log Canoe Fleet TR
- NRHP reference No.: 85002263
- Added to NRHP: September 18, 1985

The Flying Cloud is a Chesapeake Bay log canoe, built in 1932, by John B. Harrison in Tilghman, Maryland. She is built with carvel-fitted rising planks, a clipper bow, and a sharp stern. She is unusual for having been originally built with a square stern, but it was modified later in order to compete in the Govoner's Cup race. She measures 34'-11" long with a beam of 8'-8½". Flying Cloud was built in 1932 by John B. Harrison for marine engineer and businessman A. Johnson Grymes Sr., who had a summer home in Talbot County. Grymes lured Buck Richardson away from another canoe to skipper Flying Cloud, and Richardson sailed her successfully to win the Governor's Cup. His crew was uniformed in yachting whites, and the presence of the Flying Cloud and other big, new canoes aroused acrimony among the sailors of the day. The boat was later acquired by Fred Kaiser of Virginia, who sailed the boat for pleasure but did not race her, and then, in 1952, by marine artist John Noble Sr., of Staten Island. In July 2014, the boat was donated to Chesapeake Bay Maritime Museum by brothers Allan Noble and John Noble of Oxford, MD. She Currently races under the No. 22. She is one of the last 22 surviving traditional Chesapeake Bay racing log canoes that carry on a tradition of racing on the Eastern Shore of Maryland that has existed since the 1840s. Her racing team includes Judge North, and Matt Davis. Talbot County, Maryland.

She was listed on the National Register of Historic Places in 1985.
