= Oxford, Maryland =

- Town
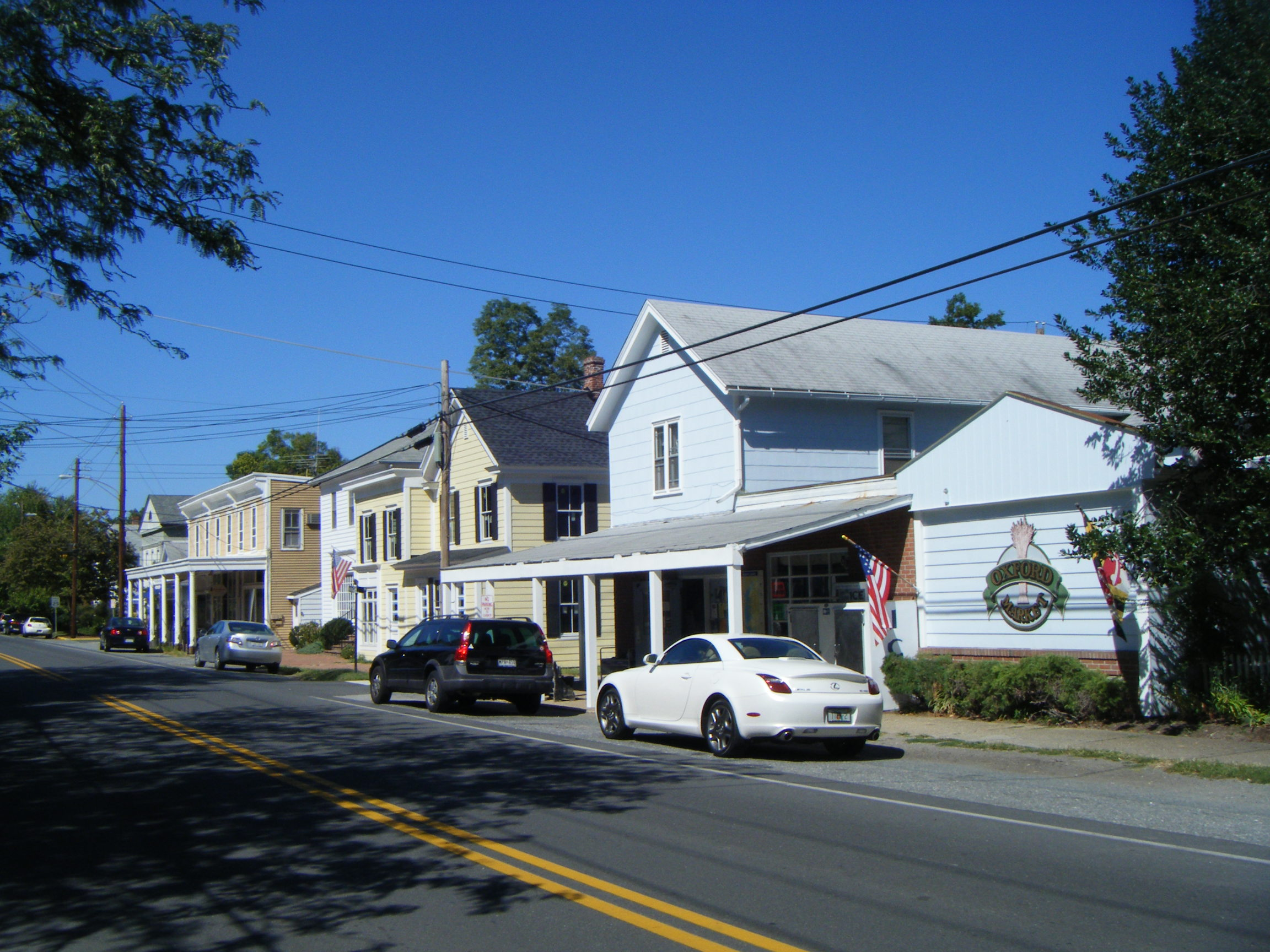
- Stores on North Morris Street

- Flag Seal

- Location of Oxford, Maryland

- Location within the U.S. state of Maryland Oxford (the United States)
- Coordinates: 38°41′12″N 76°10′15″W
- Country: United States
- State: Maryland
- County: Talbot
- Founded: 1683 (officially)
- Incorporated

Area
  - Total: 0.84 sq mi (2.17 km^{2})
  - Land: 0.56 sq mi (1.45 km^{2})
  - Water: 0.28 sq mi (0.72 km^{2})
- Elevation: 6.6 ft (2 m)

Population (2020)
  - Total: 611
  - Density: 1,088.5/sq mi (420.29/km^{2})
- Time zone: UTC-5 (Eastern (EST))
  - Summer (DST): UTC-4 (EDT)
- ZIP code: 21654
- Area code: 410
- FIPS code: 24-59450
- GNIS feature ID: 0590961
- Website: www.oxfordmd.gov

Oxford is a waterfront town and former colonial port in Talbot County, Maryland, United States. As of the 2020 census, Oxford had a population of 611.

== History ==
Oxford is one of the oldest towns in Maryland. While Oxford officially marks the year 1683 as its founding because in that year it was first named by the Maryland General Assembly as a seaport, the town began between 1666 and 1668 when 30 acres (120,000 m^{2}) were laid out as a town called Oxford by William Stephens Jr.. By 1669 one of the first houses was built for Innkeeper Francis Armstrong (see Talbot County Land Records, A 1, f. 10/11).

Oxford first appears on a map completed in 1670 and published in 1671. In 1694, Oxford and a new town called Anne Arundel (now Annapolis) were selected as the only ports of entry for the entire Maryland province. Until the American Revolution, Oxford enjoyed prominence as an international shipping center surrounded by wealthy tobacco plantations.

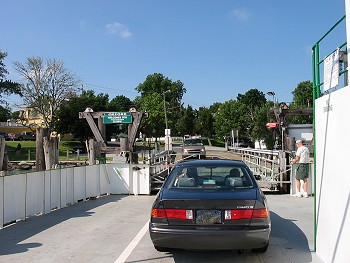
Arriving at Oxford by ferry crossing the Tred Avon River.

Early inhabitants included Robert Morris Sr., agent for a Liverpool shipping firm who greatly influenced the town's growth; his son, Robert Morris Jr., known as "the financier of the Revolution;" Jeremiah Banning, sea captain, war hero, and statesman; The Reverend Thomas Bacon, Anglican clergyman who wrote the first compilation of the laws of Maryland; Matthew Tilghman, known as the "patriarch of Maryland" and "father of statehood"; and Colonel Tench Tilghman, aide-de-camp to George Washington and the man who carried the message of General Cornwallis's surrender to the Continental Congress in Philadelphia.

Tench Tilghman's grave can be found at the Oxford cemetery. It is overshadowed by the Tench Tilghman Monument, a stone spire approximately 10 feet tall. The monument is the tallest monument found at the Oxford cemetery. The cemetery itself was used in the opening sequence of the 1988 feature film, Clara's Heart, starring Whoopi Goldberg and Neil Patrick Harris.

The American Revolution marked the end of Oxford's prosperity. Maritime trade declined, and tobacco was replaced by wheat as a cash crop.

After the Civil War, Oxford was revived by the completion of the railroad in 1871 and by improved methods of canning and packing which opened national markets for oysters from the Chesapeake Bay. This did not last. In the early part of the 20th century, the oyster beds played out, the packing houses closed, other businesses went bankrupt, and the railway and steamships eventually disappeared. Oxford became a sleepy little town inhabited mainly by watermen who still worked the waters of the Tred Avon River.

Oxford is host to the oldest privately operated ferry service still in continuous use in the United States. The original ferry service, known today as the Oxford–Bellevue Ferry, was established in 1683 and continues today. The ferry links Oxford with Bellevue, Maryland, crossing the 3/4 mile width of the Tred Avon River during a 7-10 minute trip (20 minute round trip).

Oxford today is still a waterman's town, but is enjoying a new resurgence based on tourism and leisure activities. The film Failure to Launch was filmed in part here.

The town is served by the Oxford Volunteer Fire Company, composed of two engines, a truck, tanker, command unit, brush unit, two BLS units, and a boat. They often respond to all of Talbot County as part of the Mutual Aid system. On average, they respond to over 100 calls per year.

Barnaby House, Billie P. Hall, Jena, Otwell, Oxford Historic District, and S. C. Dobson are listed on the National Register of Historic Places.

== Geography ==
Oxford is located at 38°41'12" North, 76°10'15" West (38.686776, -76.170842) on the south bank of the Tred Avon river, near its mouth, where it empties into the Choptank.

According to the United States Census Bureau, the town has a total area of 0.83 square miles (2.15 km^{2}), of which 0.54 square miles (1.40 km^{2}) is land and 0.29 square miles (0.75 km^{2}) is water. This includes Town Creek, which nearly splits the town in two from north to south and provides a protected harbor for boaters and Oxford's local shipbuilders.

=== Climate ===
The climate in this area is characterized by hot, humid summers and generally mild to cool winters. According to the Köppen Climate Classification system, Oxford has a humid subtropical climate, abbreviated "Cfa" on climate maps.

== Transportation ==
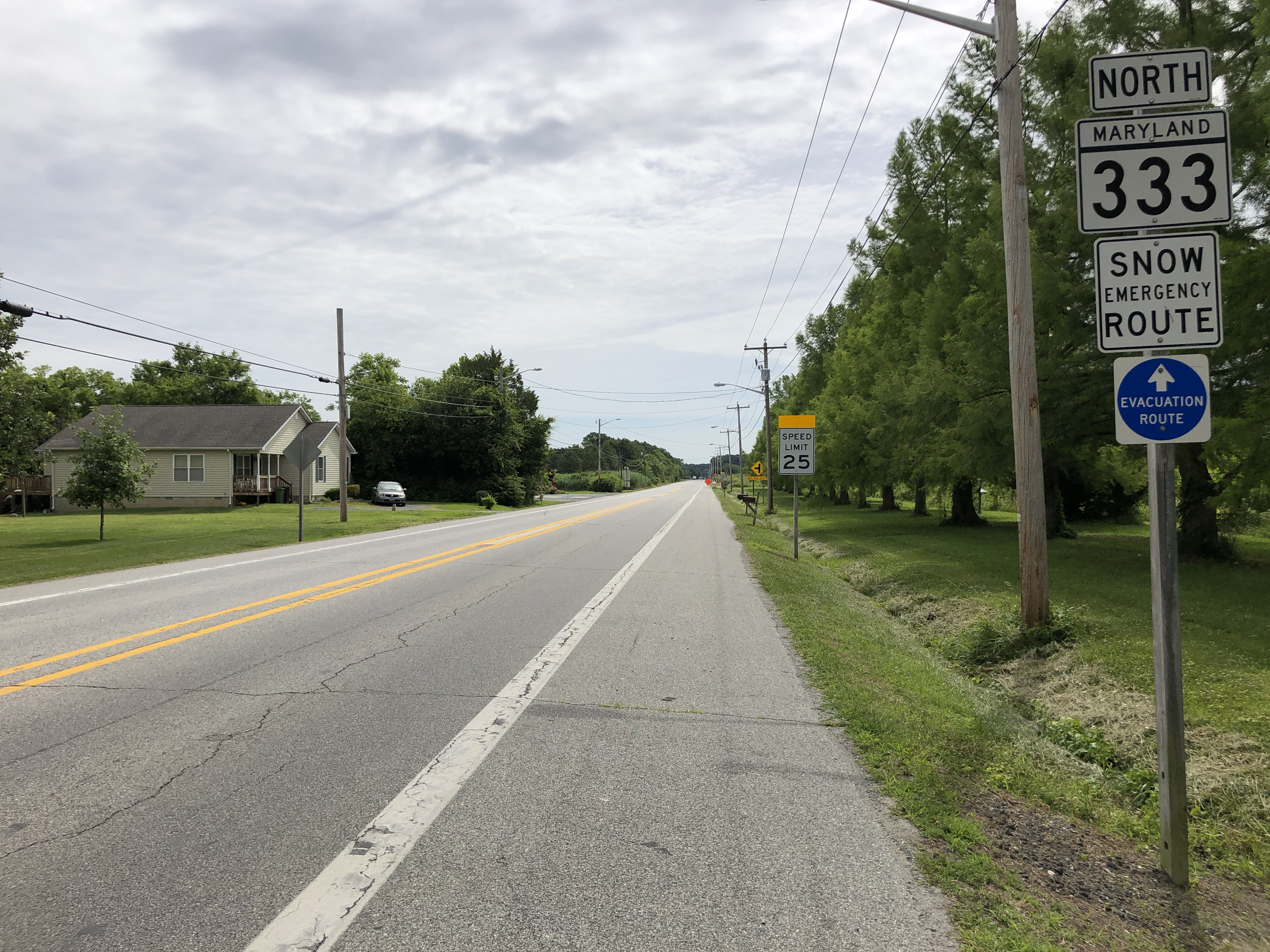
MD 333 leaving Oxford

The primary method of travel to and from Oxford is by road. The only state highway serving the town is Maryland Route 333, which connects the town to Easton. A ferry, the Oxford–Bellevue Ferry, connects the town to Bellevue.

== Demographics ==
Historical population
Census	Pop.	Note	%±
1870	227		—
1880	689		203.5%
1890	1,136		64.9%
1900	1,243		9.4%
1910	1,191		−4.2%
1920	998		−16.2%
1930	915		−8.3%
1940	826		−9.7%
1950	757		−8.4%
1960	852		12.5%
1970	750		−12.0%
1980	754		0.5%
1990	699		−7.3%
2000	771		10.3%
2010	651		−15.6%
2020	611		−6.1%
U.S. Decennial Census

Most of the town of Oxford sits on a peninsula.

=== 2010 census ===
As of the census of 2010, there were 651 people, 338 households, and 202 families residing in the town. The population density was 1,205.6 inhabitants per square mile (465.5/km^{2}). There were 574 housing units at an average density of 1,063.0 per square mile (410.4/km^{2}). The racial makeup of the town was 91.9% White, 5.4% African American, 0.6% Asian, and 2.2% from two or more races. Hispanic or Latino of any race were 0.5% of the population.

There were 338 households, of which 9.8% had children under the age of 18 living with them, 53.3% were married couples living together, 4.4% had a female householder with no husband present, 2.1% had a male householder with no wife present, and 40.2% were non-families. 32.2% of all households were made up of individuals, and 14.2% had someone living alone who was 65 years of age or older. The average household size was 1.93 and the average family size was 2.38.

The median age in the town was 61.1 years. 8.1% of residents were under the age of 18; 4.5% were between the ages of 18 and 24; 12.5% were from 25 to 44; 35.7% were from 45 to 64; and 39.2% were 65 years of age or older. The gender makeup of the town was 49.8% male and 50.2% female.

=== 2000 census ===
As of the census of 2000, there were 771 people, 396 households, and 241 families residing in the town. The population density was 1,532.4 inhabitants per square mile (591.7/km^{2}). There were 523 housing units at an average density of 1,039.5 per square mile (401.4/km^{2}). The racial makeup of the town was 92.87% White, 6.36% Black or African American, 0.13% Asian and 0.65% from two or more races. Hispanic or Latino of any race were 0.65% of the population.

There were 396 households, out of which 14.9% had children under the age of 18 living with them, 53.0% were married couples living together, 7.1% had a female householder with no husband present, and 38.9% were non-families. 34.1% of all households were made up of individuals, and 16.4% had someone living alone who was 65 years of age or older. The average household size was 1.95 and the average family size was 2.45.

In the town, the population was spread out, with 13.2% under the age of 18, 1.7% from 18 to 24, 17.3% from 25 to 44, 37.2% from 45 to 64, and 30.6% who were 65 years of age or older. The median age was 55 years. For every 100 females, there were 86.2 males. For every 100 females age 18 and over, there were 83.8 males.

The median income for a household in the town was $52,054, and the median income for a family was $71,071. Males had a median income of $52,708 versus $33,929 for females. The per capita income for the town was $47,917. About 2.5% of families and 3.3% of the population were below the poverty line, including 7.1% of those under age 18 and 2.7% of those age 65 or over.

== Notable people ==
- Waters Edward Turpin (1910–1968), novelist, professor; born in Oxford
- James Turrell (born 1943), visual artist, resides in Oxford part-time
