= Easton Historic District (Easton, Maryland) =

Historic district in Maryland, United States

- U.S. National Register of Historic Places
- U.S. Historic district
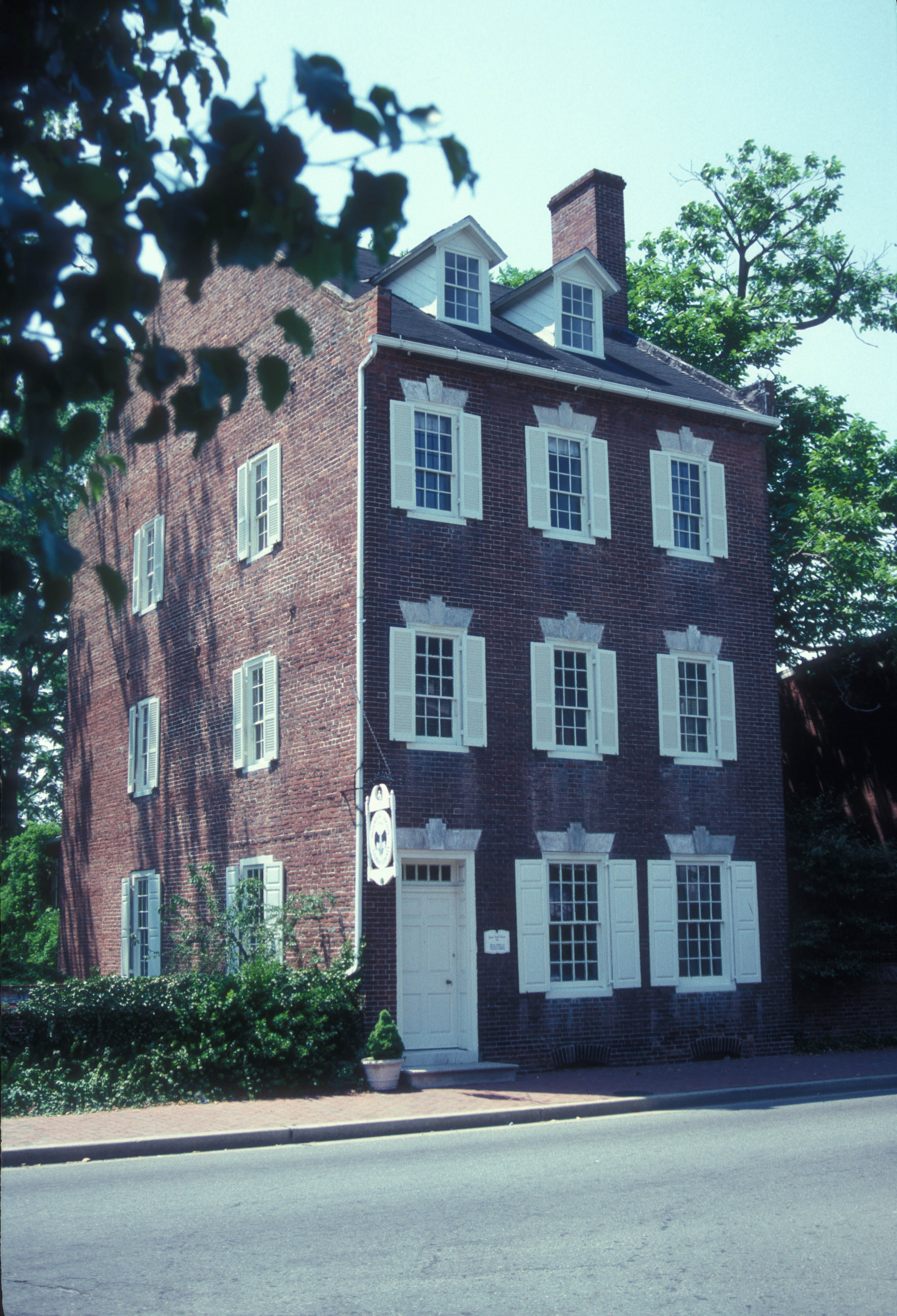
- James Neall House

- Location within Maryland Location within the United States
- Location: MD 565, MD 328 and MD 331, Easton, Maryland
- Coordinates: 38°46′19″N 76°4′26″W
- Area: 232 acres (94 ha)
- Architect: Upjohn, Richard; Et al.
- Architectural style: Greek Revival, Italianate, Federal
- NRHP reference No.: 80001835
- Added to NRHP: September 17, 1980

The Easton Historic District is a historic district that covers most of the core of the town of Easton, Maryland. The town is the county seat of Talbot County. The state of Maryland is nearly split by the Chesapeake Bay, and Easton is located on the east side of the bay that is known as Maryland's Eastern Shore. Although the town is part of the east coast of the United States, the region's history goes back to a time when Maryland was a colonial province of England.

The Easton Historic District was added to the National Register of Historic Places in 1980. It contains approximately 900 buildings mostly built in the 18th, 19th, and early 20th centuries. Many of these buildings are residential, but the original business district, located on the west side, is also included. A notable exception to the continuity of the historic district and the construction dates is the original Quaker Third Haven Meeting House, which was constructed in the 1680s southeast of the main portion of the district.

== Background ==
=== Beginning ===
Talbot County, as part of the Province of Maryland, began being settled during the mid-1600s with land grants from Lord Baltimore (Cecilius Calvert). Early settlers established tobacco plantations along rivers such as the Choptank, Tred Avon, St. Michaels (now Miles), and Wye rivers. Some of the larger 17th and 18th century plantations within the county were owned by the Goldsborough, Lloyd (Wye Plantation), and Hollyday (Ratcliffe Manor) families. Other early settlers included members of the Society of Friends, also known as Quakers. Politics and society for the next two centuries were strongly influenced by members of the Goldsborough, Hollyday, Kerr, Lloyd, and Tilghman families.

In 1706, a portion of Talbot County was broken off to help form Queen Anne's county. This made the county seat in York close to the county border, which was inconvenient for the population in now-smaller Talbot County. Court was held in private residences located in Oxford, which was closer to the population—but a courthouse was never built. Instead, construction of a courthouse began in 1710 near what was known then as "Pitt's Bridge". At the time, the only other nearby building of importance was the Quaker Third Haven Meeting House, which was built in 1682. The village around the courthouse became known as Talbot Courthouse. After the American Revolution, the village became more important as the state of Maryland chose to establish administrative offices for the Eastern Shore at Talbot Courthouse. The town became, in effect, the "capital" of Maryland's Eastern Shore. Its nearest waterfront (Tred Avon River) was about one mile (1.6 km) away, and eventually became known as Easton Point. (Note: The Tred Avon River has been called many names, including Tred-Avon, Trad-Avon, Tred-Aven, Tred-Haven, Trad-Haven, Tread-Haven, Trade-Haven, and Third Haven. It has also been called Tred-Aven Creek.)

In 1788, the Maryland General Assembly gave Talbot Courthouse a name: Easton. The town prospered, and the Maryland Eastern Shore's first newspaper was established in 1790. The original courthouse became too small for state offices and local, state, and federal courts, so a new courthouse was constructed. The new courthouse was completed in 1794. Growth continued as the Eastern Shore's first bank was established in 1805 in Easton. During the War of 1812, Fort Stoakes was constructed on a plantation overlooking the Tred Avon River for protection from an attack by the British, and the local bank moved currency to a more secure place in Pennsylvania. In 1817, the Eastern Shore's first steamboat line to Baltimore was established at Easton Point. As more farmland was developed on the west side of the Chesapeake Bay, Maryland's Eastern Shore declined in prosperity—and the American Civil War accelerated this decline. In 1869, a railroad line from Delaware connected Easton with major population centers in the eastern United States. (Note: The Maryland & Delaware Railroad (not to be confused with the Maryland and Delaware Railroad incorporated in 1977) ran from Smyrna Station (later named Clayton, Delaware), and Oxford, Maryland. Construction began in 1857 in Delaware. The line reached Easton in 1869, and was completed to Oxford in 1871. The rail connection provided access to Wilmington, Philadelphia, Baltimore, and New York City. The railroad was reorganized as the Delaware and Chesapeake Railroad Company in 1877, and eventually became a branch line for the Pennsylvania Railroad. Passenger operations ended in 1949, and the last freight train ran in 1983.) This brought prosperity back to the town that continued until the Great Depression of the 1930s. The Chesapeake Bay Bridge connected Annapolis with Maryland's Eastern Shore in 1952.

=== Easton today ===
Traveling by automobile from major Maryland cities such as Annapolis or Baltimore, the most direct route to Easton involves crossing the bay using the Chesapeake Bay Bridge and traveling east and south on U.S. Route 50. The town is small to medium-sized, with a population of about 17,000 using the 2020 United States census. Its original street plan was created in 1785, and Colonel Jeremiah Banning named the main street that runs through the business district (and past the courthouse) after George Washington. The town has grown from Banning's time, and annexations include land along the Tred Avon River. Easton remains the county seat of Talbot County, and its courthouse was enlarged in 1958 by adding two wings. Despite the town's early existence, most of the buildings in the Easton Historic District were constructed in the late 19th and early 20th centuries. The district contains about 9,000 buildings located in residential areas and the central business district. The Easton Historic District was nominated for the National Register of Historic Places in 1980. It is significant for its collection of buildings from the 18th, 19th and early 20th centuries.

== Contributing structures ==
In the original 1980 nomination form, the Easton Historic District consisted of approximately 900 buildings and structures within approximately 232 acres (94 ha). Twenty-three were contributing, two non–contributing, and numerous others had not yet been evaluated. The sortable table below contains the original contributing structures that are part of the historic district. If the year built is a range of years, the middle of the range is used.

Name	MHT Code	Address	Coordinates	Image	Built	Notes and Citations
McDaniel House	T-294	Aurora St., 14 N.	38.77484°N 76.07144°W		1890 circa	Large 2 1/2-story Victorian home with tower, hipped roof with dormers.
(unnamed)	T-410 (mentioned on fourth page of file)	Aurora St., 212 S.	38.7697953°N 76.0712467°W		1910	Queen Anne style architecture was predominate in the last third of the 1800s
Third Haven Meeting House (second)	T-47	Border Lane	38.766604°N 76.0752576°W		1880 circa	2nd Quaker meeting house built in 1879–1880. One-and-one-half stories brick building that is three bays wide and four bays long.
Post Office	T-410 (mentioned on fourth page of file)	Dover St., 116 E.	38.7741197°N 76.0736147°W		1936	Built using Colonial Revival architecture typical of 1930s. Replaced Post Office on Washington Street in 1936.
Avalon Theatre	T-627	Dover St., 40–42 E.	38.7743166°N 76.0749692°W		1922	One of the first "state-of-the-art" movie houses on Maryland's Eastern Shore. Exterior has Art Deco theme. Began being renovated in 1987, and upgraded to a performing arts center.
Wrightson House	T-461	Dover St., 202 E.	38.7740583°N 76.0727644°W		1895 circa	Now known as the Tidewater House, the Wrightson House has rare (for Easton) Beaux-Arts architecture.
Old Frame Hotel (Nevius & Frampton Hardware)	T-39	Goldsborough St., 1	38.7756902°N 76.0761511°W		1866	Hotel constructed in 1866 converted to hardware store beginning in 1897. A fire in 1955 caused the roof to be replaced. Gray aluminum siding has been added.
Luby House	T-29	Goldsborough St., 200	38.7757828°N 76.0729552°W		1845 circa	Town's best example of Greek Revival architecture. Porch and wing (1940s) are modern but built to be compatible with the main portion of the house. Two–and–a–half-story home with frieze "lie–on–your–stomach" windows in the attic.
Trinity Cathedral (Episcopal Church)	T-239	Goldsborough St., 313	38.7758945°N 76.0705224°W		1894	Granite Gothic motif building with interior hammer beams. Consecrated in 1894, this tall building has numerous stained glass windows. Original cathedral, built in 1876 and located behind the current one, is now used as a parish house.
Railroad Workers House	T-496	Goldsborough St., 416	38.775942°N 76.0687533°W		1871	Maryland and Delaware Railroad began service to Easton in 1869. Front porch has been removed.
Easton Armory	T-484	Harrison St., 40 S.	38.725769°N 76.0746061°W		1927	Crenellated brick and stone building emulating medieval fortification
Schlecht House	T-494	Harrison St., 114 S.	38.7717155°N 76.0744033°W		1880 circa	Two-story private home with L-shaped porch
Chaffinch House	T-34	Harrison St., 132 S.	38.7707112°N 76.0743498°W		1895 circa	Corner Victorian house on Harrison Street and Brookletts Avenue that fronts to both streets. Round corner tower with porch on both facades, irregular roof line with gables
Asbury Methodist Episcopal Church	T-421	Higgins St., 18 S.	38.7733052°N 76.0700058°W		1876	Gothic revival brick church with tower and spire in the middle of the front facade. Large stained glass window above entrance. Interior has stamped tin ceilings and wainscotting.
Talbot County Women's Club	T-11	Talbot Lane, 18	38.7729393°N 76.0738194°W		1794 circa	Brick Federal architecture building with Flemish bond brick facade. One of Easton's best preserved early structures. Unusual placement of wing is thought to be for the purpose of enabling windows near the main entrance.
Easton Gas Manufacturing Plant	T-1156	West Street, 1 S.	38.7708096°N 76.0773054°W	demolished	1934	Colonial Revival architecture In 2001, Maryland Department of the Environment identified soil and groundwater contamination on site.
Christ Church	T-15	South St. & Harrison St.	38.7723888°N 76.0746597°W		1840 circa	English Gothic architecture with features such as arch windows and doors with heavy stone. (Stone buildings are rare on the Eastern Shore.) Vaulted one-story building was first in Easton with a church bell. Reverend Henry M. Mason, who came to Easton in 1838, had a church designed two years earlier in New Jersey by architect William Strickland. The Easton church is based on Strickland's design for the New Jersey church.
Christ Church Rectory (Christ Church Parish House)	T-16	South St., 12	38.7723628°N 76.0750137°W		1852	One-and-one-half-story granite building designed by Richard Upjohn. Christ Church is adjacent on east side while a garden is on the west side.
Easton Railroad Station (Delaware/Penn-Central Station)	T-251	Powell's Alley	38.7755156°N 76.0682631°W		1900 circa	Easton's brick railroad station with two-bay ticket window. Roof's widely flaring eaves provided cover for the railway platform.
Talbot County Courthouse	T-65	Washington St.	38.7748°N 76.076953°W		1794	Brick Georgian structure was constructed in 1794 and is one of Easton's oldest buildings. Expanded in 1890 and remodeled in 1958. Former site of the Talbot Boys Confederate monument, and current location of a monument to Frederick Douglass.
Odd Fellows Hall (Miller Lodge, I.O.O.F.)	T-1	Washington St., 1 S. (corner of Washington and Dover)	38.7745171°N 76.0763075°W		1879	Independent Order of Odd Fellows built this lodge in 1879 after an earlier lodge burnt down. Distinctive four-story brick building with irregular roof line. Washington Street facade has a small tower-like gable, topped by a finial, that contains the interior stairway. Large decorative windows are centered on the fourth floor of a larger gable, and each window contains stained glass patterned with symbols of the fraternal order.
Shannahan & Wrightson Hardware Co.	T-404	Washington St., 12 N.	38.7749197°N 76.0763407°W		1877	Three-story brick building (note name at top of building) near courthouse. Second floor built 1881, and third floor built 1889. Good example of a Victorian commercial building.
Third Haven Meeting House	T-46	Washington St., 405 S.	38.766604°N 76.0752576°W		1682	Society of Friends meeting house

=== Other structures within the historic district ===
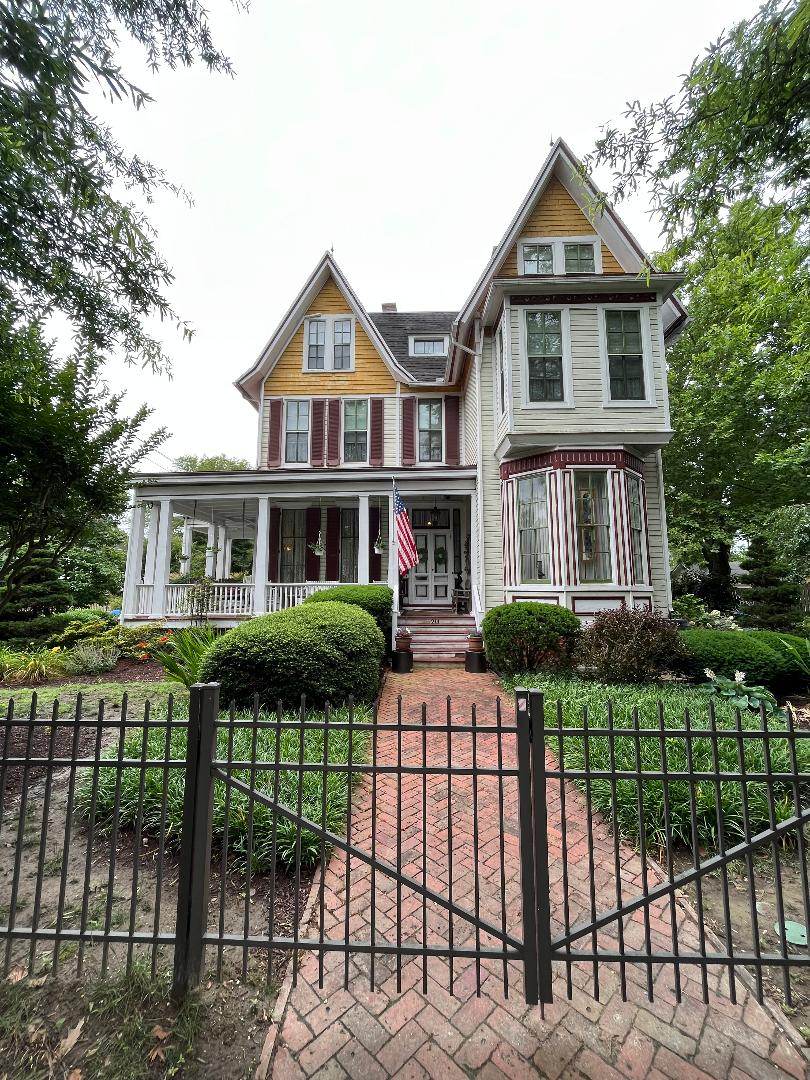
Bishop's House

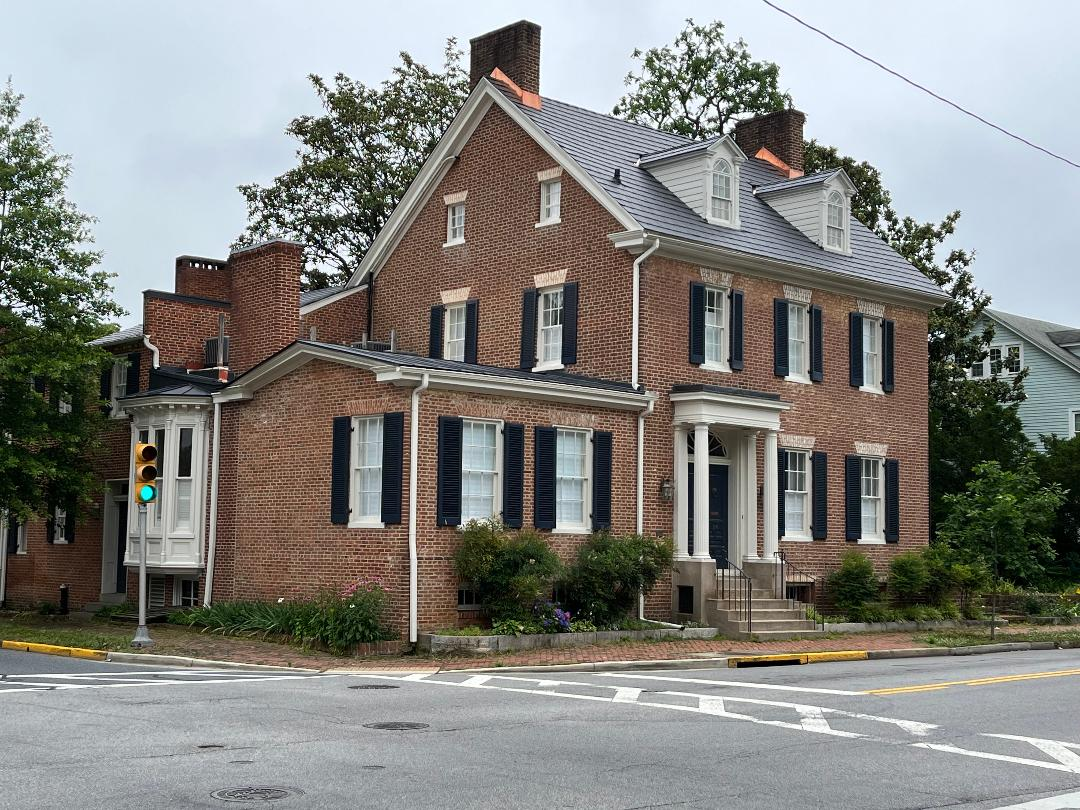
Foxley Hall

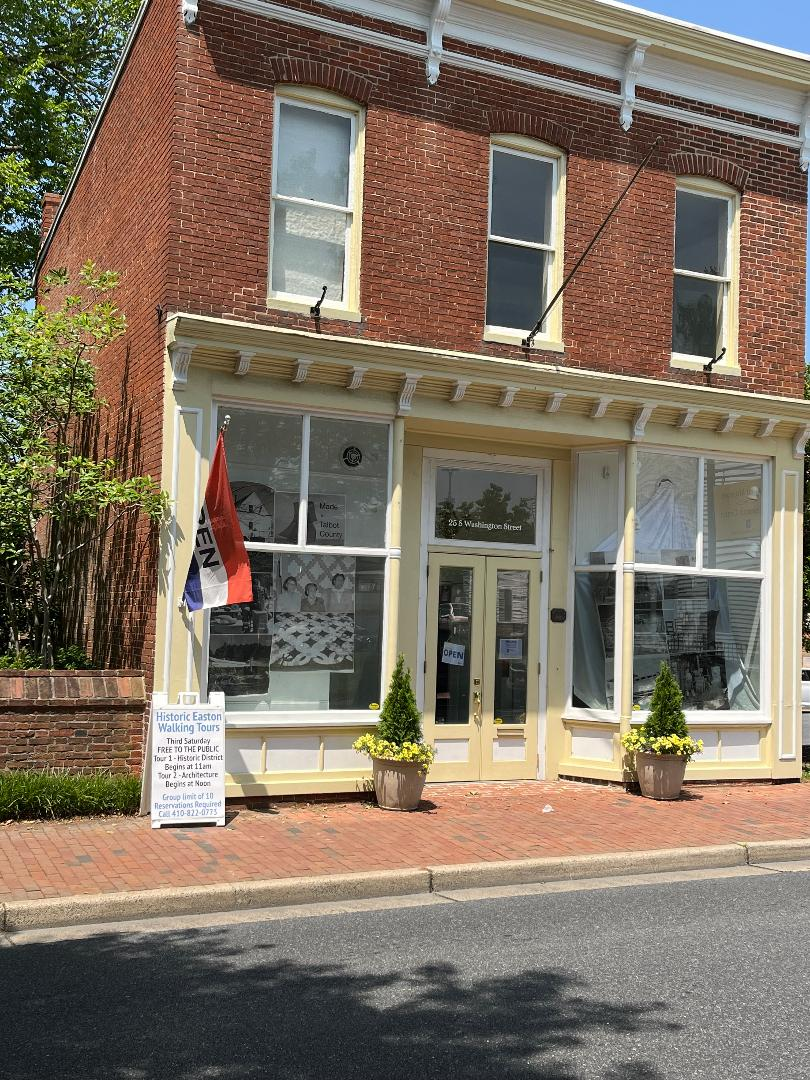
Victorian Store

- Bishop's House was built around 1880 by Philip Francis Thomas, former governor of Maryland and former Secretary of the Treasury under President James Buchanan. The house was built after Thomas' retirement. After his death in 1890, his widow sold the house to the Diocese of Easton, and it was used as the home of the Bishop of Easton until 1956. The tall structure with gabled pavilions on the major facades is located at the corner of Aurora and Goldsborough streets. Although it has facades on both streets, the house's address is 214 Goldsborough Street, and it contributes to the Historic District.
- Bullitt/Chamberlain House, one of Easton's most elegant buildings, is located at 102 East Dover Street (corner of Dover and Harrison, sometimes list as 100 East Dover). Lawyer Thomas James Bullitt built this brick house in 1801. Granddaughter Elizabeth Chamberlaine and descendants owned the property into the 20th century. House is a contributing Federal architecture property to the Historic District. It is currently the headquarters of the Mid-Shore Community Foundation.
- Foxley Hall is located at 24 North Aurora Street (corner of Aurora and Goldsborough, across Aurora Street from the Bishop's House). It has a Flemish Bond brick facade built in the 1790s. The name "Foxley" is in honor of Mary Foxley Tilghman, daughter of Colonel Oswald Tilghman. The building has had numerous additions, and the interior was altered in the late 19th century. In 1816, the property was sold to John Leeds Kerr, whose daughter married General Tench Tilghman, grandson of the Tench Tilghman that was an aide-de-camp to George Washington in the American Revolution. This began a multi-generation ownership by the Tilghman family. Foxley Hall is a contributing property to the Historic District, and is a well–preserved example of the town's early architecture.
- James Neall House is located at 27 South Washington Street, and is owned by the Talbot County Historical Society. Quakers James and Rachael Cox Neall constructed the house around 1805. The Federal-style brick townhouse is three-and-a-half stories high and has a two-story rear addition. The Historical Society has furnished the kitchen and major rooms in this three-story museum brick home. The house is a contributing property to the Easton Historic District.
- Tidewater Inn is located at the corner of Dover and Harrison streets. Constructed in the late 1940s, it is outside of the Historic District's period of significance, but it is still considered a contributing property. The four-story structure houses a hotel and restaurant. It is architecturally significant for its Colonial Revival architecture, and it is historically significant for its contribution to the mid-20th century development of Easton and Talbot County. By itself it was listed on the National Register of Historic Places in 2007.
- Victorian Store is located at 25 South Washington Street, and is the home of the Talbot County Historical Society. Constructed circa 1880, the Historical Society maintains a museum and small library in the building.

== Historic District Borders ==
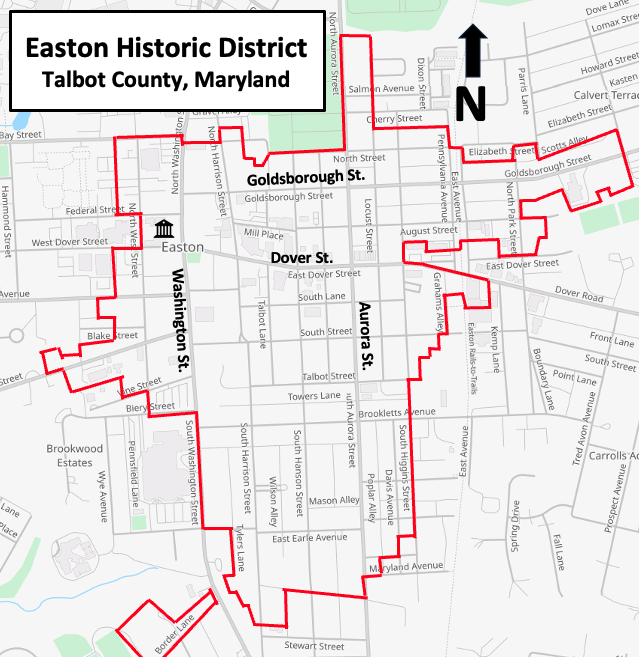
Easton Historic District

The Easton Historic District includes the core of the town that began with a courthouse in the 18th century. Many of the buildings are residential, but the original business district is also included. The business district is located on the northern part of the west side of the district near the courthouse along Washington Street. Additional businesses are on Goldsborough and Dover streets close to Washington Street. Most of the town's buildings in the historic section are brick structures from the late 19th and early 20th centuries. Less than a dozen buildings are from the 18th century, and about 50 date from the early 19th century.

The Talbot County Courthouse, with an address of 11 North Washington Street, occupies most of a block surrounded by Washington, Dover, West, and Federal streets. Three churches are original contributing properties to the district. Trinity Cathedral is located on Goldsborough Street and Locust Lane, east of Aurora Street. The Bishop's House and Foxley Hall are about a block away. Christ Church is in the west central portion of the district at South Street and South Harrison Street. The Christ Church Rectory is next door, and the Armory Building is across the street. The Ashbury Methodist Episcopal Church is in the east central portion of the district, about one block south of Dover Street on South Higgins Street. At the extreme southwestern portion of the historic district is a non-contiguous section near Border Lane, and this is the location of the two Third Haven Meeting House buildings.

== See also ==
- List of the oldest buildings in Maryland

== Notes ==
=== References ===
- Arnett, Earl; Brugger, Robert J.; Papenfuse, Edward C. (1999). Maryland: A Guide to the Old Line State. Baltimore, Maryland: Johns Hopkins University Press. ISBN 978-0-80185-979-3. OCLC 245919199.
- Claggett, Laurence G. (1999). Easton. Charleston, South Carolina: Arcadia. ISBN 978-0-73850-171-0. OCLC 44799734.
- Tilghman, Oswald; Harrison, Samuel Alexander (1915). History of Talbot County, Maryland, 1661-1861 - Volume I. Baltimore, Maryland: Williams and Wilkins Company. OCLC 1541072. Archived from the original on April 3, 2023.
- Tilghman, Oswald; Harrison, Samuel Alexander (1915a). History of Talbot County, Maryland, 1661–1861 – Volume II. Baltimore, Maryland: Williams and Wilkins Company. OCLC 1541072. Archived from the original on April 11, 2023.
