= George A. Taylor (bishop) =

American prelate (1903–1978)

The Right Reverend George Alfred Taylor D.D.
- Bishop of Easton
- Church: Episcopal Church
- Diocese: Easton
- Elected: September 21, 1966
- In office: 1967–1975
- Predecessor: Allen J. Miller
- Successor: W. Moultrie Moore, Jr.

Orders
- Ordination: May 1929 by Thomas Frederick Davies Jr.
- Consecration: December 21, 1966 by John E. Hines

Personal details
- Born: November 9, 1903 Hazardville, Connecticut, United States
- Died: March 13, 1978 (aged 74) Alexandria, Virginia, United States
- Denomination: Anglican
- Parents: Frank Webb Taylor & Maude Mary Evans
- Spouse: Alice Tucker Jones; Anne Gary Pannell
- Children: 2

George Alfred Taylor (November 9, 1903 - March 13, 1978) was an American prelate who served as the sixth Bishop of Easton between 1967 and 1975.

== Early life and education ==
Taylor was born on November 9, 1903, in Hazardville, Connecticut, the son of Frank Webb Taylor and Maude Mary Evans. He was educated at the public secondary school in Springfield, Massachusetts, and later studied at Springfield College from where he graduated with a Bachelor of Arts in 1925. Later he was admitted to the Yale Divinity School from where he gained his Master of Divinity in 1928, after which he pursued a year of postgraduate study at General Theological Seminary. In 1946 he received a Master of Arts from Bethany College. He was awarded an honorary Doctor of Divinity from General Theological Seminary in 1967.

== Ordained ministry ==
Taylor was ordained deacon in June 1928 by Bishop G. Ashton Oldham and priest in May 1929 by Bishop Thomas Frederick Davies Jr. of Western Massachusetts. He then became curate at Grace Church in New York City. In 1929 he became rector of St Philip's Church in Easthampton, Massachusetts, and in 1932 transferred to Albany, New York, to become rector of St Paul's Church. Between 1947 and 1959 he served as rector of St David's Church in Baltimore, Maryland. In 1959, he was appointed dean of the Northern Convocation in the Diocese of Easton and rector of St Paul's Church in Fairlee, Maryland.

== Bishop ==
Taylor was elected Bishop of Easton on the third ballot at a special convention on September 21, 1966. He was consecrated in Christ Church, Easton, Maryland, on December 21, 1966, with Presiding Bishop John E. Hines as chief consecrator. He succeeded as bishop on January 1, 1967, and was installed in Trinity Cathedral on January 5, 1967. Taylor retired in 1975. He was a trustee at the Episcopal Theological Seminary and a member of the Yale Alumni Association of Maryland. He died in Alexandria, Virginia, on March 13, 1978.

== Family ==
Taylor married Alice Tucker Jones, June 28, 1933, and together they had two sons. After her death in 1969, he married Ann Gary on June 12, 1971.
