= List of the original 30 Anglican parishes in the Province of Maryland =

In 1692, the Church of England, also known as the Anglican Church, became the established church of the Province of Maryland through an Act of the General Assembly. Ten counties had been established in the colony, and those counties were divided into 30 parishes. After the American Revolutionary War, they became part of the Episcopal Diocese of Maryland, which split off the Episcopal Diocese of Easton in 1868 and the Episcopal Diocese of Washington in 1895.

The following is a sortable List of the original 30 Anglican parishes in the Province of Maryland.

Current church name	Image	1692 parish name	Location	County, etc.	Predates 1692?	Current status	NRHP	Description	Website
01. All Faith Church, Charlotte Hall		All Faiths	Mechanicsville; 38885 New Market Turner Rd. MD 6	St. Mary's	Yes, 1655	Active parish	Yes	In Calvert County until 1695; now in the Episcopal Diocese of Washington	
02. All Hallows Church, South River		All Hallows' or South River	Edgewater; 3604 Solomon's Island Road; MD 2	Anne Arundel	Yes	Active parish	Yes		
03. All Hallows, Snow Hill		Snow Hill	Snow Hill; 109 West Market St.	Worcester	No	Active parish	Yes	In Somerset County until 1742; now in Episcopal Diocese of Easton	
04. All Saint's, Sunderland		All Saints'	Sunderland; 100 Lower Marlboro Road	Calvert	No	Active parish	Yes		
05.Christ Church, Cambridge		Great Choptank	Cambridge; 601 Church St.	Dorchester	No	Active parish	Yes	now in Episcopal Diocese of Easton	
06. Christ Church, Chaptico		King and Queen	Chaptico; 25390 Maddox Rd, MD 238	St. Mary's	Yes, 1640	Active parish	Yes	now in Episcopal Diocese of Washington	
07.Christ Church, Easton		St. Peter's	Easton; 111 South Harrison St.	Talbot	Yes	Active parish	No	now in Episcopal Diocese of Easton	
08. Christ Church, Kent Island		Christ Church, Kent Island	Stevensville; 1880 church: 117 East Main St. 1996 church: 830 Romancoke Road	Queen Anne's	Yes, 1631	Active parish	Yes*	*1880 church is on NRHP. Parish planted from Virginia; now in Episcopal Diocese of Easton	
09. Christ Church, La Plata		Port Tobacco	La Plata; 112 East Charles St.	Charles	Yes, 1683	Active parish	No	Current building disassembled in Port Tobacco and reassembled in La Plata (1904-05); now in the Episcopal Diocese of Washington	
10. Christ Church, Nanjemoy		Durham	Nanjemoy; 8685 Ironsides Rd.	Charles	Yes	Active parish	No	now in Episcopal Diocese of Washington	
11. Christ Church, Port Republic		Christ Church	Port Republic; 3100 Broomes Island Rd.	Calvert	Yes	Active parish	Yes		
12. Christ Church, St. Michael's		St. Michael's	St. Michaels; 103 Willow St.	Talbot	Yes	Active parish	No (Note: Christ Church of St Michaels is part of the St. Michaels Historic District.)	now in Episcopal Diocese of Easton	
13. Christ Church, Wayside		William and Mary (Pickawaxon)	Newburg; 13050 Rock Point Rd.	Charles	Yes	Active parish	No	now in the Episcopal Diocese of Washington	
14. Church of the Resurrection, Joppatowne	Church of the Resurrection, Joppatown	Copley, Gunpowder or St. John's	Joppatowne; 700 Anchor Dr. at Bridge Drive	Harford		Active parish	No	Harford split from Baltimore in 1773. Historic churchyard, tho current church modern. Replaced for over a century by St. James Church (Monkton, Maryland) and St. John's Church (Kingsville, Maryland), 11901 Bel Air Rd.	
15. St. Andrew's Church, Princess Anne		Somerset	Princess Anne; 30513 Washington St.	Somerset	No	Active parish	No	now in Episcopal Diocese of Easton	
16.St. Anne's Church, Annapolis		Middle Neck	Annapolis; Church Circle	Anne Arundel	No	Active parish	No		
17. St. Bartholomew's Church, Green Hill		Stepney	Quantico; Green Hill Church Rd.	Wicomico	No	Closed	Yes	In Somerset County until 1867; now in Episcopal Diocese of Easton. Annual August worship service held by three local Episcopal churches.	
18. St. George's Church, Poplar Hill, Valley Lee		William and Mary	Valley Lee; 44965 Blake Creek Rd.	St. Mary's	Yes, 1638	Active parish	Yes		
19. St. James' Church, Lothian		Herring Creek	Lothian; 5757 Solomons Island Rd.	Anne Arundel	Yes	Active parish	Yes		
20. St. John's, Broad Creek		Broad Creek, King George's, or Piscataway	Fort Washington; 9801 Livingston Rd.	Prince's George's	No	Active parish	Yes	now in the Episcopal Diocese of Washington; several chapels of ease founded since 1710 became new parishes	
21. St. Margaret’s Church, Annapolis		Broad Neck or Westminster	Annapolis; 1601 Pleasant Plains Rd.	Anne Arundel	No	Active parish	No		
22. St. Mary the Virgin Church, Pocomoke City		Coventry	Pocomoke City; 20 Third St.	Worcester	No	Active parish	No*	In Somerset County until 1742; now in Episcopal Diocese of Easton. *Coventry Parish Ruins is on the NRHP	
23. St. Paul's Church, Baden		St. Paul's	Brandywine; 13500 Baden-Westwood Rd.	Prince's George's	No	Active parish	Yes	In Calvert County until 1696; now in Episcopal Diocese of Washington; chapel of ease for northern part of parish became St. Thomas Church, Croom	
24. St. Paul's, Baltimore		Patapsco or St. Paul's	Baltimore; 309 Cathedral St.	Baltimore City	Yes, 1729	Active parish	Yes		
25. St. Paul's Church, Centreville	St. Paul's Church, Centreville, MD	St. Paul's	Centreville; 301 S. Liberty St.	Queen Anne's	No	Active parish	No	In Talbot County until 1706; now in Episcopal Diocese of Easton	
26. St. Paul's, Kent		St. Paul's	Chestertown; 7579 Sandy Bottom Rd.	Kent	No	Active parish	Yes	now in Episcopal Diocese of Easton	
27. St. Stephen's Church, Earleville	North Sassafras Parish	North Sassafras	Earleville; 14 Glebe Rd.	Cecil	Yes, 1680?	Active parish	Yes	now in Episcopal Diocese of Easton	
28. Shrewsbury Parish Church, Kennedyville		South Sassafras	Kennedyville; 12824 Shrewsbury Church Rd.	Kent	Yes, 1675	Active parish	Yes	now in Episcopal Diocese of Easton	
29. Spesutia or St. George's Church, Perryman	Spesutia church or st george's parish, Perryman, Maryland	St. George's or Spesutia	Perryman; Intersection of Perryman and Chelsea roads	Harford	Yes	Inactive parish since 2013	No*	*St. George's Parish Vestry House is on the NRHP. Pentecostal congregation now uses church, but churchyard remains Maryland diocesan property.	
30. Old Trinity Church, Church Creek		Dorchester	Church Creek; 1716 Taylors Island Rd.	Dorchester	Yes, 1675	Active parish	No	now in Episcopal Diocese of Easton	

== See also ==
- List of post 1692 Anglican parishes in the Province of Maryland

== Notes ==
=== References ===
- Middleton, Arthur Pierce (1992). Anglican Maryland, 1692-1792. Virginia Beach, Virginia: Walsworth Publishing Company. ISBN 978-0-89865-841-5.
