= W. Moultrie Moore Jr. =

American bishop

The Right Reverend William Moultrie Moore Jr D.D., S.T.D.
- Bishop of Easton
- Church: Episcopal Church
- Diocese: Easton
- Elected: November 1, 1975
- In office: 1975–1983
- Predecessor: George A. Taylor
- Successor: Elliott L. Sorge
- Previous post: Suffragan Bishop of North Carolina (1967-1975)

Orders
- Ordination: May 1941 by Albert Sidney Thomas
- Consecration: May 27, 1967 by Albert R. Stuart

Personal details
- Born: June 11, 1916 Mount Pleasant, South Carolina, United States
- Died: November 23, 1998 (aged 82) Mount Pleasant, South Carolina, United States
- Buried: Christ Church Cemetery, Mount Pleasant, South Carolina
- Denomination: Anglican
- Parents: William Moultrie Moore & Jennie Verdie Edmonston
- Spouse: Florence Porcher
- Children: 3
- Education: College of Charleston

William Moultrie Moore Jr (June 11, 1916 – November 23, 1998) was Suffragan Bishop of the Episcopal Diocese of North Carolina from 1967 to 1975 and Bishop of the Episcopal Diocese of Easton from 1975 to 1983.

== Early life and education ==
Moore was born on June 11, 1916, in Mount Pleasant, South Carolina, the son of William Moultrie Moore and Jennie Verdie Edmonston. He attended Porter Military Academy in Charleston, South Carolina and later studied at College of Charleston from which he graduated with a Bachelor of Arts in 1937. He also graduated with a Bachelor of Sacred Theology from General Theological Seminary in 1941.

== Ordained ministry ==
Moore was ordained deacon in June 1940 and priest in May 1941, the latter by Bishop Albert Sidney Thomas of South Carolina. Between 1940 and 1942, he served as minister-in-charge of various churches, including St Alban's Church in Kingstree, South Carolina, St Luke's Church in Andrews, South Carolina, St Stephen's Church in St. Stephen, South Carolina and a mission in Rhems, South Carolina. In 1942 he became rector of Epiphany Church in Leaksville, North Carolina and St Thomas' Church in Reidsville, North Carolina. Between 1944 and 1952 he served as rector of St Luke's Church in Salisbury, North Carolina and between 1952 and 1967 he was rector of St Martin's Church in Charlotte, North Carolina.

== Bishop ==
Moore was elected Suffragan Bishop of North Carolina on February 1, 1967, during the annual convention of the diocese which took place in St Paul's Church, Winston-Salem, North Carolina. He was consecrated on May 27, 1967, by Bishop Albert R. Stuart of Georgia, assisted by Bishop Thomas Fraser of North Carolina and Bishop Richard H. Baker emeritus of North Carolina. He was elected Bishop of Easton on November 1, 1975, on third ballot at a special Convention which took place in Trinity Cathedral, Easton, Maryland. He served there until his retirement in 1983.

== Family ==
In 1941, Moore married Florence Porcher and together had three daughters.

Episcopal Church (USA) titles
Preceded by George Alfred Taylor	7th Bishop of Easton; 1975-1983	Succeeded by Elliott Lorenz Sorge
Vacant Title last held by Henry Beard Delany	2nd Bishop Suffragan of North Carolina; 1967-1975	Succeeded by Frank Vest
