= William McClelland =

William McClelland may refer to:

- William McClelland (politician), member of the U.S. House of Representatives from Pennsylvania
- William C. McClelland, medical doctor and Australian rules football player and administrator
- William McClelland (bishop), American prelate
- Jack McClelland (footballer, born 1930) (William John McClelland), English footballer
