= List of post-1692 Anglican parishes in the Province of Maryland =

The Church of England, also known as the Anglican Church, became the established church of the Province of Maryland through an Act of the General Assembly in 1692. Ten counties had been established in the colony at the time, and those counties were divided into 30 parishes. After 1692 but before the American Revolution, 15 additional parishes were established.

The following is a sortable List of the post 1692 Anglican parishes in the Province of Maryland.

Current church name	Image	Original parish name	Location	County, etc.	Year established	Current status	NRHP	Description	Website
01. All Saints Church Frederick	All Saints Church, erected 1813, Principal Parish Church until 1855	All Saints' Parish	Frederick; 106 West Church Street	Frederick	1742	Active parish	No	Frederick County split off Charles County in 1748	
02. Good Shepherd Church, Chesapeake City	Good Shepherd Church, Chesapeake City, Maryland	Augustine Parish	310 George StreetChesapeake City	Cecil	1744	Active parish	No	Another church in parish, St. Augustine's, is at MD310 and Mitton Rd; both now in Episcopal Diocese of Easton	
03. Christ Church IU Parish, Worton	Christ Church IU, Chester Parish, Worton, Maryland	Chester Parish	Worton; 25328 Lambs Meadow Road	Kent	1765	Active parish	Yes	now in Episcopal Diocese of Easton and surrounded by historic cemetery. Other historic parish church is Emmanuel Church, Cross and High Streets, Chestertown, Maryland, built in 1767 and which hosted founding diocesan convention.	
04. Christ Episcopal Church, Rockville	Christ Episcopal Church, Rockville, Maryland	Prince George's Parish	Rockville; 107 S. Washington Street	Montgomery	1726	Active Parish	No	Now in Episcopal Diocese of Washington; other parish church before creation of Montgomery County and Washington, D.C. is St. Paul's Episcopal Church, Rock Creek Parish (Washington, D.C.), whose current structure built 1775 is older than this rebuilt building	
05; St. Barnabas' Episcopal Church, Leeland		Queen Anne	Upper Marlboro; 14705 Oak Grove Road	Prince George's	1704	Active parish	No	now in Episcopal Diocese of Washington	
06. Christ Church, Columbia		Queen Caroline Parish	Columbia; 6800 Oakland Mills Road	Howard	1728	Active parish	Yes	Howard County split from Anne Arundel County in 1838	
07. St. Andrew's Church, Leonardtown		St. Andrew's Parish	California; 44078 St. Andrew's Church Road	St. Mary's	1744	Active parish	Yes	now in Episcopal Diocese of Washington	
08. St. Paul's, Hillsboro		St John's Parish	Hillsboro; Church Street, south of MD 404	Caroline	1748	Inactive	Yes	Caroline County split off Queen Anne's County in 1773; Episcopal Diocese of Easton retreat center within former parish	
09. St. James Church, Monkton	St. James Episcopal Church, Monkton, Maryland	St. James' Parish	Monkton; 3100 Monkton Road	Baltimore County	1770	Active parish	Yes	former chapel of ease for St. John's Parish, Joppatowne	
10. St. Luke's Church, Church Hill	St.LukesLRWalls	St. Luke's Parish	Church Hill	Queen Anne's	1728	Active parish	Yes	now in Episcopal Diocese of Easton	
11. St. Mary Anne's Episcopal Church, North East		St. Mary Anne Parish, or North Elk Parish	North East; 315 South Main Street	Cecil	1706	Active parish	No	now in Episcopal Diocese of Easton	
12. Christ Church, Denton		St. Mary's Whitechapel Parish	Denton; 105 Gay Street	Caroline	1725	Active parish	No	Caroline County split from Dorchester County in 1773; now in Episcopal Diocese of Easton	
13. St. Thomas Church, Owings Mills		St. Thomas' Parish	Owings Mills; 232 St. Thomas Lane	Baltimore County	1742	Active parish	Yes		
14. Trinity Church, Charles County		Trinity Parish	Newport; Trinity Church; 9560 Trinity Church Road; Hughesville; Oldfields Chapel; 15837 Prince Frederick Road	Charles	1744	Active parish	No	now in Episcopal Diocese of Washington	
15. St. Paul's Episcopal Church, Worcester Parish		Worcester Parish	Berlin; St. Paul's; 3 Church Street; Showell; St. Martin's, 1756	Worcester	1753	Active parish*	Yes*	*St. Paul's is active while St. Martin's, on the NRHP, is now a church museum. Now in Episcopal Diocese of Easton	

== See also ==
- List of the original 30 Anglican parishes in the Province of Maryland
