= William McClelland (bishop) =

American bishop

The Right Reverend William McClelland D.D.
- Bishop of Easton
- Church: Episcopal Church
- Diocese: Easton
- Elected: January 31, 1939
- In office: 1939–1949
- Predecessor: George W. Davenport
- Successor: Allen J. Miller

Orders
- Ordination: December 20, 1914 by Philip M. Rhinelander
- Consecration: June 2, 1939 by Henry St. George Tucker

Personal details
- Born: January 22, 1883 Philadelphia, Pennsylvania, United States
- Died: April 16, 1949 (aged 66) Easton, Maryland, United States
- Buried: Old Trinity Church, Church Creek, Maryland
- Denomination: Anglican
- Parents: Alfred Lee Mcclelland & Marion Taylor MacDongall
- Spouse: E. Rozelle Connelly
- Children: 2
- Education: Harvard University

William McClelland (January 22, 1883 - April 16, 1949) was an American prelate who served as the fourth Bishop of Easton between 1939 and 1949.

== Early life and education ==
McClelland was born on January 22, 1883, in Philadelphia, Pennsylvania, the only son of Alfred Lee McClelland and Marion Taylor MacDongall. Educated in the Philadelphia public schools and then at Temple College Preparatory School, he later graduated with a Bachelor of Arts from Harvard University (in 1911). Following further studies at the Philadelphia Divinity School, he graduated with a Bachelor of Divinity in 1914. McClelland received a Master of Arts from the University of Pennsylvania in 1915 and was awarded a Doctor of Divinity in 1939 by the Philadelphia Divinity School.

== Ordained ministry ==
Mcclelland was ordained deacon on June 7, 1914, and priest on December 20, 1914. He was appointed curate of St Matthew's Church in Francisville, Philadelphia and in 1916 became rector of St Luke's Church in Bustleton, Philadelphia. In 1924 he took responsibility of the Parish of Dorchester in Dorchester County, Maryland, which included the Church of St Stephen's Church in East New Market, Maryland and St Paul's Church in Vienna, Maryland.

== Bishop ==
Mcclelland was elected Bishop of Easton on January 31, 1939, during a special convention held in Trinity Cathedral (Easton, Maryland). He was then consecrated on June 2, 1939, in Christ Church, Easton, Maryland. Trustee, University of the South. He died in office on April 16, 1949, at the Memorial Hospital of Easton, Maryland.
