= Martin Townsend =

Martin Townsend may refer to:

- Martin I. Townsend (1810–1903), American lawyer and politician from New York
- Martin Townsend (journalist) (1960–2025), British editor of the Sunday Express
- Martin G. Townsend (born 1943), American Episcopalian bishop
