= Allen J. Miller =

American bishop

The Right Reverend Allen Jerome Miller Ph.D.
- Bishop of Easton
- Church: Episcopal Church
- Diocese: Easton
- Elected: June 23, 1949
- In office: 1949–1966
- Predecessor: William McClelland
- Successor: George A. Taylor

Orders
- Ordination: December 1934 by Ernest M. Stires
- Consecration: November 9, 1949 by Noble C. Powell

Personal details
- Born: April 10, 1901 Jersey City, New Jersey, United States
- Died: April 24, 1991 (aged 90) Naples, Florida
- Denomination: Anglican
- Parents: Frank O. Miller & Julia Louise Hilldring
- Spouse: Etta Merrill Vigue

Allen Jerome Miller (April 10, 1901 – April 24, 1991) was an American prelate who served as the fifth Bishop of Easton between 1949 and 1966.

== Early life and education ==
Miller was born in Jersey City, New Jersey on April 10, 1901, the son of Frank O. Miller and Julia Louise Hilldring. He was educated at the William L. Dickinson High School. He then studied at Johnson College in Knoxville, Tennessee and graduated with a Bachelor of Arts in 1924. He then attended the Yale Divinity School and graduated with a Bachelor of Divinity in 1930. That same year, he was made a Yale Fellow, being awarded the Hocker-Dwight Fellowship which enabled him to study abroad. He then studied at the University of Edinburgh from where he graduated with a Doctor of Philosophy with honors in 1934.

== Ordained ministry ==
Initially Miller was ordained as a Presbyterian minister; however, after joining the Episcopal Church, he was ordained deacon in June 1934 by Bishop John Insley Blair Larned, Suffragan of Long Island, and priest in December 1934, by Bishop Ernest M. Stires of Long Island. On July 30, 1940, he married Etta Merrill Vigue. After ordination, he became priest-in-charge of St Anne's Church in Bridgehampton, New York, and in 1936 became assistant priest at St Thomas' Church in Washington D.C., until 1937. Between 1937 and 1944 he served as rector of Trinity Church in Utica, New York. In 1944 he became rector of the Church of the Messiah in Baltimore, Maryland.

== Bishop ==
Miller was elected Bishop of Easton on the fifth bishop during a special convention of the diocese on June 23, 1949. He was consecrated on November 9, 1949, in Christ Church (Easton, Maryland) by Bishop Noble C. Powell of Maryland. He resigned his post on December 31, 1966, with effect as from January 1, 1967.

== Author ==
Miller is the author of two books titles The Kingdom of Inner Meaning (1936) and An Introduction of a Theory of Christian Education.
