= All Faith Church =

Historic church in Maryland, United States

- U.S. National Register of Historic Places
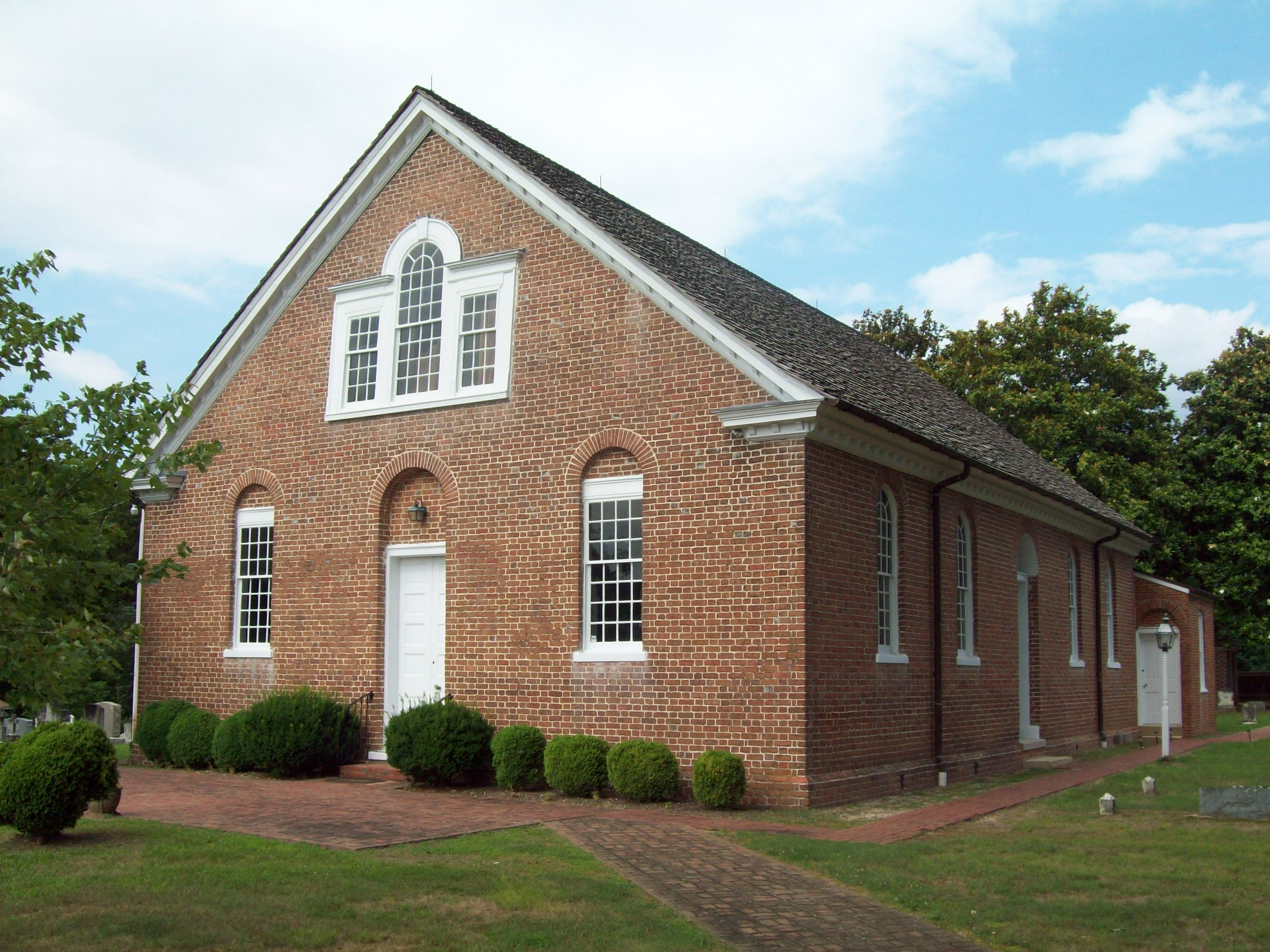
- All Faith Church, July 2009

- Location within Maryland Location within the United States
- Nearest city: Charlotte Hall, Maryland
- Coordinates: 38°27′37″N 76°43′50″W
- Built: 1766-1769
- Architect: Boulton, Richard; Abell, Samuel Jr.
- Architectural style: Georgian
- NRHP reference No.: 03001328
- Added to NRHP: December 29, 2003

All Faith Church, or All Faith Protestant Episcopal Church, is a historic church located at Charlotte Hall, St. Mary's County, Maryland. It was built between 1766 and 1769. It is a one-story brick, laid in Flemish bond, building with a wood shingle roof. It is one of the best examples of preserved Georgian ecclesiastical design and construction in St. Mary's County. All Faith is one of the original 30 Anglican parishes in the Province of Maryland.

It was listed on the National Register of Historic Places in 2003.
