= James J. Shand =

American bishop

The Right Reverend James Joseph Shand D.D.
- Bishop of Easton
- Church: Episcopal Church
- Diocese: Easton
- Elected: September 28, 2002
- In office: 2003–2014
- Predecessor: Martin G. Townsend
- Successor: Santosh Marray

Orders
- Ordination: 1972
- Consecration: January 25, 2003 by Robert W. Ihloff

Personal details
- Born: 1946 (age 79–80) New York City, New York, United States
- Denomination: Anglican

James Joseph Shand (born 1946) is an American prelate of the Episcopal Church who served as the tenth Bishop of Easton from 2003 till 2014.

== Biography ==
Shand was born in 1946 in New York City, and grew up in Plainfield, New Jersey. He studied at the now closed Canaan College in Canaan, New Hampshire and graduated with a Bachelor of Arts in 1969. He then studied at the Philadelphia Divinity School where he earned his Master of Divinity in 1972. In 2003, he also received an honorary Doctor of Divinity from Virginia Theological Seminary. In 2009, he also became chairman of the Board of Trustees of the Virginia Theological Seminary.

Shand was ordained deacon and priest in 1972. He then served as assistant at Grace Church in Merchantville, New Jersey and in 1975 he became rector of St Mary Anne's Church in North East, Maryland. Between 1989 and 2003 he was rector of Christ Church in Stevensville, Maryland.

He was elected Bishop of Easton on September 28, 2002, and was consecrated on January 25, 2003, by Bishop Robert W. Ihloff of Maryland at the Hyatt Regency Chesapeake Bay in Cambridge, Maryland. On November 19, 2013, Shand announced his intention to retire July 1, 2014.
