= George W. Davenport =

American bishop (1870–1956)

The Right Reverend George William Davenport D.D., S.T.D.
- Bishop of Easton
- Church: Episcopal Church
- Diocese: Easton
- Elected: June 2, 1920
- In office: 1920–1938
- Predecessor: William Forbes Adams
- Successor: William McClelland

Orders
- Ordination: May 31, 1896 by William Paret
- Consecration: September 15, 1920 by Daniel S. Tuttle

Personal details
- Born: August 14, 1879 Brandon, Vermont, United States
- Died: July 25, 1956 (aged 76) Auburndale, Massachusetts, United States
- Buried: Pine Hill Cemetery, Brandon, Vermont
- Denomination: Anglican
- Parents: Willard Goss Davenport & Mary Converse Backus
- Spouse: Jennie Platt Briggs
- Children: 4

George William Davenport (August 14, 1870 – July 25, 1956) was the third bishop of the Episcopal Diocese of Easton, serving from 1920 to 1938.

== Early life and education ==
Davenport was born on August 14, 1870, in Brandon, Vermont, the son of the Reverend Willard Goss Davenport and Mary Converse Backus. His father was rector of Emmanuel Church in Washington D.C. for over thirty years. He was educated in the Washington High School and at St Paul's School in Baltimore. He then studied at Hobart College and graduated with a Bachelor of Arts, before moving to the Maryland Theological Class and the General Theological Seminary, from where he graduated in 1896. In 1920, Davenport was awarded a Doctor of Sacred Theology from Hobart College and a Doctor of Divinity from the University of Vermont in 1921.

== Ordained ministry ==
Davenport was ordered deacon on October 17, 1893, and priest on May 31, 1896, both by Bishop William Paret of Maryland. After his ordination to the diaconate, he was appointed in charge of the Church of St John the Baptist in Baltimore, Maryland, while in 1895 he became assistant at St Matthew's Church in New York City, where he remained till 1896. Between 1896 and 1899 he served as rector of the Church of the Resurrection in Richmond Hill, Queens, and then, in 1899 became rector of the Church of the Redeemer in Astoria, Queens. In 1902 he moved to Danbury, Connecticut, to serve as rector of St James’ Church until 1912 when he became Provincial Secretary of Province One. In 1915 he became rector of St Paul's Church in Burlington, Vermont, while between 1919 and 1920 he was the executive secretary of the Seamen's Church Institute of America.

== Bishop ==
Davenport was elected Bishop of Easton on June 2, 1920, during the 52nd annual convention of the diocese, which met at Sudlersville, Maryland. He was consecrated bishop on September 15, 1920, by Presiding Bishop Daniel S. Tuttle. Davenport retired on November 7, 1938, and died on July 25, 1956, in Auburndale, Massachusetts, after a prolonged illness.
