= Tidewater Inn =

Historic inn in Maryland, US

- U.S. National Register of Historic Places
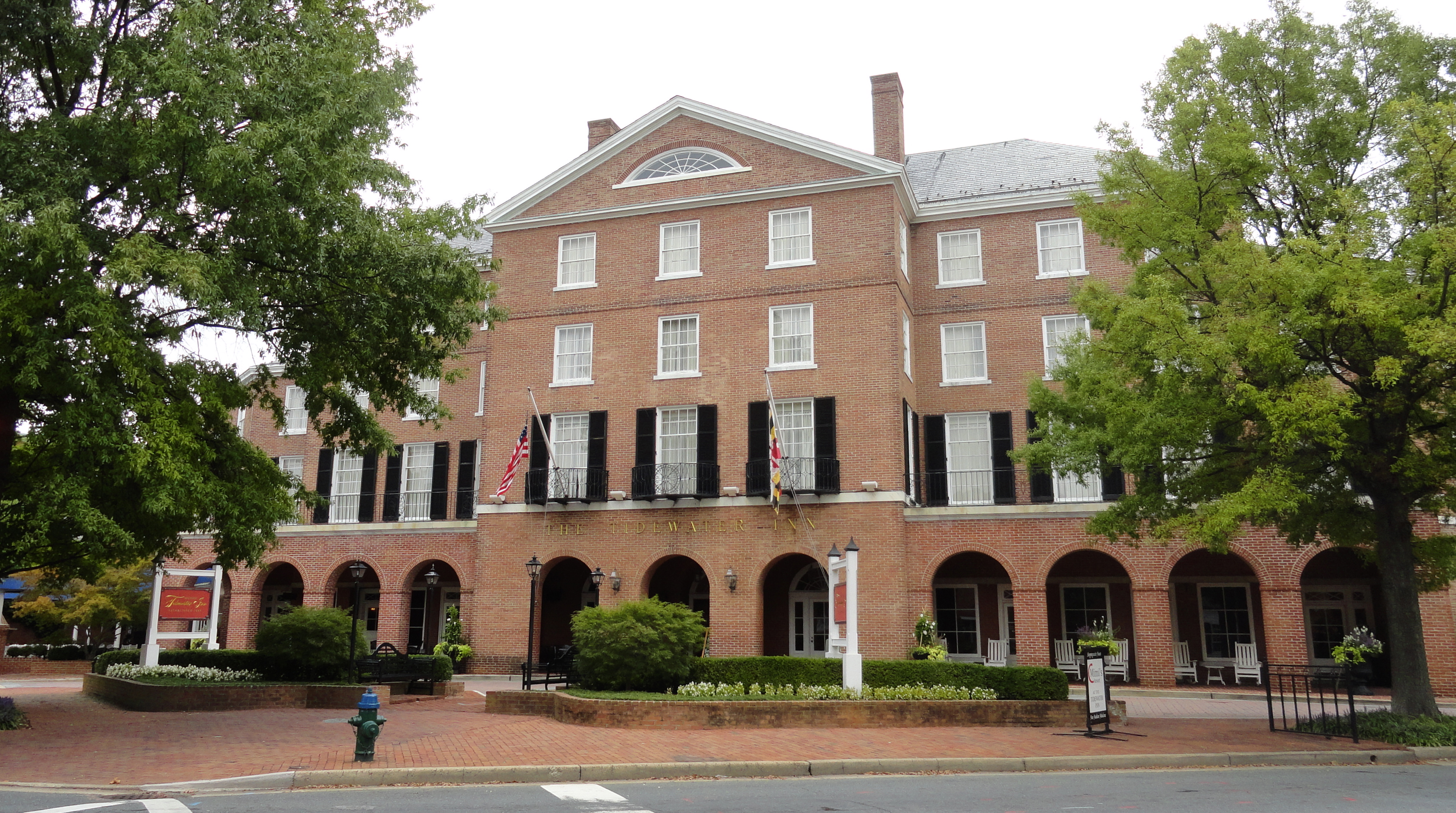
- Tidewater Inn, September 2012

- Location within Maryland Location within the United States
- Location: 101 E. Dover St., Easton, Maryland
- Coordinates: 38°46′28″N 76°4′29″W
- Built: 1949
- Architect: Litchfield, Clarence B.; Bower, Frank W. Jr.
- Architectural style: Colonial Revival
- NRHP reference No.: 07001118
- Added to NRHP: November 02, 2007

Tidewater Inn is a historic hotel in Easton, Talbot County, Maryland, United States. It is a Colonial Revival brick, hip-roofed, four-story hotel with flanking three-story wings and an addition on the north wing. Arthur Johnson Grymes Jr. was the original builder. The original section was completed in 1949, with an addition to the north constructed in 1953. The floor plan of the original building is a flattened chevron shape. It served as the preeminent hostelry and community gathering place on the Maryland Eastern Shore during the time when new automobile-oriented transportation routes intensified the volume of visitors.

The inn has a restaurant with bar, and 89 guest rooms and suites, including the Tidewater House. It also serves as a wedding venue and hosts events such as opening night activities for Easton's Waterfowl Festival. Notable guests include Bing Crosby, the Kennedys, Robert Mitchum, Elvis Presley, and Elizabeth Taylor. The Tidewater Inn was listed on the National Register of Historic Places in 2007.

During March 2026, it was announced that the Tidewater Inn would be sold. The current leadership team is continuing operations with no changes. Although a listing is not expected to be active for a few more months, the sale is expected before the end of the year.

== See also ==
- Easton Historic District
