= Elliott L. Sorge =

American bishop

The Right Reverend Elliott Lorenz Sorge D.D.
- Bishop of Easton
- Church: Episcopal Church
- Diocese: Easton
- Elected: April 30, 1983
- In office: 1983–1993
- Predecessor: W. Moultrie Moore, Jr.
- Successor: Martin G. Townsend
- Previous post: Bishop of South-Central (1971-1977)

Orders
- Ordination: December 1954 by Richard R. Emery
- Consecration: 1971 by Plinio Lauer Simões

Personal details
- Born: January 31, 1929 Michigan City, Indiana, United States
- Died: December 6, 2011 (aged 82) Denver, Colorado, United States
- Buried: St Timothy's Church, Centennial, Colorado
- Denomination: Anglican
- Parents: Charles Bryan Sorge & June Violet Benson
- Spouse: Marjorie Aline Romine
- Children: 3

Elliott Lorenz Sorge (January 31, 1929 - December 6, 2011) was a bishop in The Episcopal Church, serving in Brazil and the Diocese of Easton.

== Early life and education ==
Sorge was born on January 31, 1929, in Michigan City, Indiana, the son of Charles Bryan Sorge and June Violet Benson. He graduated with a Bachelor of Arts from DePauw University in 1951. He also graduated with a Master of Divinity and gained his Licentiate of Theology from Seabury-Western Theological Seminary in 1954. He was given a Doctor of Divinity from Seabury-Western in 1971.

== Ordained ministry ==
Sorge was ordained deacon in June 1954 and a priest in December 1954 by Bishop Richard R. Emery of North Dakota. He was then appointed as priest-in-charge of St Mary and St Mark's Church in Oakes, North Dakota, while in 1960 he became rector of St Luke's Church in Ellendale, North Dakota and of St Stephen's Church in Fargo, North Dakota. He married Marjorie Aline Romine on September 4, 1959. He also served as Chairman of the Christian Education Committee of the diocese of North Dakota between 1960 and 1964, Chairman of the Camp and Conference Committee between 1958 and 1964, delegate to General Convention of 1958 and 1964, and a member of the Diocesan Council. In 1964, Sorge became a missionary in the Anglican Episcopal Church of Brazil, where he organized St Andrew's mission in São Paulo. In 1966, he went to Belém where he served as Director of John F. Kennedy Episcopal School between 1966 and 1970 and administrator of St Luke's Pediatric Hospital. In 1970 he became rector of All Saints' Church and St Mark's Church in Santos, São Paulo.

== Episcopacy ==
Sorge was elected the first Bishop of the Diocese of South-Central in Brazil on January 31, 1970, and was consecrated in 1971 by Bishop Plinio Lauer Simões. He resigned his see to make way for a Brazilian bishop and returned to the United States in 1977 and became Field Officer for the Development of Ministry at the Episcopal Church Center in New York. He was elected Bishop of Easton on April 30, 1983, on the first ballot. He retained the post till his retirement in 1993.
