= William Forbes Adams =

Bishop of the Episcopal Diocese of Easton (1833–1920)

The Right Reverend William Forbes Adams D.D., LL.D., D.C.L.
- Bishop of Easton
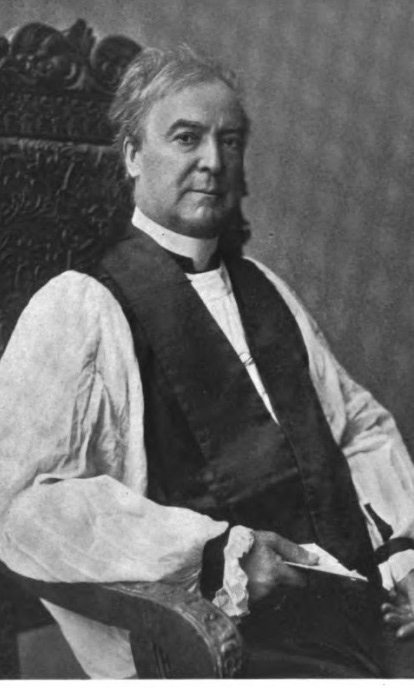
- Province: Episcopal Church
- Diocese: Easton
- In office: 1887–1920
- Predecessor: Henry C. Lay
- Successor: George W. Davenport
- Previous posts: Missionary Bishop of Arizona and New Mexico (1875–1876)

Orders
- Ordination: July 29, 1860 by William Mercer Green
- Consecration: January 17, 1875 by William Mercer Green

Personal details
- Born: January 2, 1833 Enniskillen, Ireland
- Died: March 5, 1920 (aged 87)
- Denomination: Anglican
- Occupation: lawyer, clergyman
- Education: University of the South (D.C.L.)

William Forbes Adams (January 2, 1833 – March 5, 1920) was bishop of the Episcopal Diocese of Easton. He also served as a missionary bishop of Arizona and New Mexico.

== Early years and education ==
Adams was born on January 2, 1833, in Enniskillen, Ireland, and when he was eight, he and his family arrived in the United States, who settled in Kentucky. Young Adams was fitted for Yale, but pecuniary reverses attendant upon the failure of his father in business, obliged him to forego his plans, then he bravely accepted the change in his circumstances, obtained a mercantile situation, and in his leisure time studied law, so, in 1854 he was admitted to the Mississippi bar.

He received the degree of D.C.L. from the University of the South at Sewanee, Tennessee.

== Career ==
He removed to Tennessee, and pursued his theological studies with a view to entering the church, then returned to Mississippi before the completion of his course, and was ordained a deacon in St. Andrew's church, Jackson, Mississippi, on December 15, 1859, admitted to full orders as priest on July 29, 1860. His first charge, which he held for six years, was St. Paul's, Woodville, Mississippi, in 1866 he became rector of St. Peter's, New Orleans, and took charge of St. Paul's in the same city the following year, where he remained until his consecration as first Missionary bishop of New Mexico and Arizona on November 2, 1874.

He was consecrated on January 17, 1875, by Bishop William Mercer Green of Mississippi in St Paul's Church in New Orleans. After his consecration he traveled to the missionary territory accompanied by his chaplain the Reverend Henry Forrester. He commenced his journey in Las Vegas and journeyed by mail coach to Santa Fe, New Mexico. From there he left for Albuquerque, New Mexico where he held the first Episcopal service at the Exchange Hotel on March 4, 1875. He resigned his post due to poor physical health on October 15, 1876.

In 1876 Dr. Adams became rector of Holy Trinity, Vicksburg, Mississippi, in the next year, he was accepted by the House of Bishops, continued to serve as rector of Holy Trinity Church until 1887, when he was again elected to the Episcopal office, as Bishop of Easton; he was 109th in succession in the American Episcopate. He remained at this service till his death on March 20, 1920.

== Sources ==
- Batterson, Hermon Griswold (1891). A Sketch-book of the American Episcopate (3rd ed.). Philadelphia: J. B. Lippincott. p. 285.

Attribution
