= Henry C. Lay =

American bishop

The Right Reverend Henry Champlin Lay D.D., LL.D., S.T.D.
- Bishop of Easton
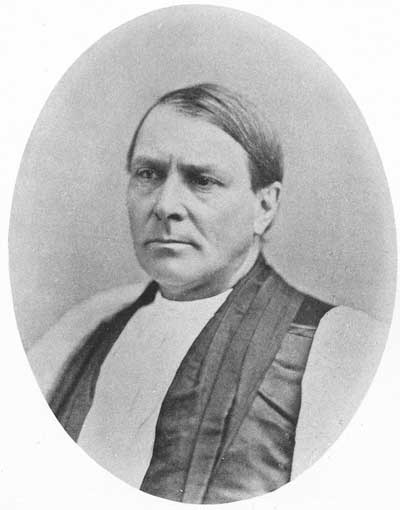
- Church: Episcopal Church
- Diocese: Easton
- Elected: April 1, 1869
- In office: 1869–1885
- Successor: William Forbes Adams
- Previous post: Bishop of Arkansas (1859-1869)

Orders
- Ordination: July 12, 1848 by Nicholas H. Cobbs
- Consecration: October 23, 1859 by William Meade

Personal details
- Born: December 6, 1823 Richmond, Virginia, U.S.
- Died: September 17, 1885 (aged 61) Baltimore, Maryland, U.S.
- Buried: Spring Hill Cemetery; Easton, Maryland, U.S.
- Denomination: Anglican
- Parents: John Olmstead Lay & Lucy Anna May
- Spouse: Eliza Withers Atkinson
- Children: 3
- Education: University of Virginia

Henry Champlin Lay (December 6, 1823 – September 17, 1885) was a bishop of the Episcopal Church in the United States of America.

== Early life ==
Born to Richmond merchant John Olmstead Lay and his wife Lucy Anna May of Petersburg, Virginia, Henry Champlin Lay was baptized in St. John's Church, although his parents were members of the city's Monument Church parish. His mother died when Henry was 10, and his father six years later. Lay attended the Richmond Academy run by Socrates Maupin. He then entered the University of Virginia on September 1, 1839 (before reaching his sixteenth birthday) and graduated with a Master of Arts degree on July 4, 1842. Lay then tutored the children of General William H. Broadnax at Kingston in Dinwiddie County for nearly two years.

== Early ministry ==
Lay began theological studies at Virginia Theological Seminary in Alexandria, Virginia on October 12, 1844, taking the first and second year courses simultaneously. He graduated in due course and on July 10, 1846, was ordained deacon by William Meade and assigned to the historic Lynnhaven parish near Virginia Beach, which also operated a free school pursuant to the bequest of its rector who had died as the American Revolution began.

The following spring, after marrying as discussed below, Lay moved to Huntsville, Alabama to serve as rector of the Church of the Nativity. Nicholas H. Cobbs ordained Lay a priest on July 12, 1848. During his eleven-year leadership, the sixty member congregation built a brick church, still standing, which could seat 600. Lay was chosen as a deputy to the General Convention in 1850 and 1859. Between those terms, in 1857, he received a Doctor of Divinity D.D. degree from Hobart College in New York.

== Arkansas and Confederate episcopate ==
In 1859, while attending the General Convention in Richmond during the controversy over John Brown's raid on Harpers Ferry, Lay was elected missionary bishop of the Southwest, with jurisdiction over "Arkansas, the Indian territory, Arizona and New Mexico", and consecrated by Meade, Cobbs, Leonidas Polk, Stephen Elliott and several others on October 23, 1859. Lay immediately moved to Arkansas, planning that his wife and three children would follow when he settled down. After an exploratory trip around his new diocese (which extended west to Phoenix, Arizona), Lay decided to make his base in Fort Smith, where Polk had established Christ Church in 1840. After returning to Huntsville for the birth of his son, Lay went on an extended tour from Savannah, Georgia to New York City to raise funds for his missionary work. In the summer of 1860, Lay moved his wife, four children and three slaves (including a newly purchased twelve-year-old named Lizzy) to Fort Smith, where a gift from a Virginia cousin enabled them to buy a small house so they could plant a vegetable garden and keep pigs, a chicken and a cow.

When the American Civil War began, Fort Smith's military garrison surrendered to the Confederate forces on April 24, 1861. Lay returned home from a diocesan tour to check on his family, then decided to advise his clergy that they no longer needed pray for the President. He wrote after the fall of Fort Sumter, "I am now Southern, Secession and all that. But I could weep day and night for the misery before us and the folly that has brought us to it." His brothers colonels George Lay (a West Point graduate) and John Lay (on the staff of general Braxton Bragg) also sided with the Confederate cause. His young son Thomas soon died and was buried in the garden. For the next four years, the Lay family never again settled — traveling first to Little Rock, then returning to Huntsville shortly before its capture by federal forces under General Ormsby Mitchell in April 1862. Lay was among the twelve prominent Huntsville citizen hostages locked in the Probate Judge's office for thirteen days as security their fellow citizens' "good behavior" towards the occupying enemy. Three weeks after his release, Mrs. Lay delivered her seventh child, a son, but days later their daughter Lucy died. In August 1862 the Federal troops retreated from Huntsville, but they left about 100 Union soldiers too sick to move. Bishop Lay immediately began visiting them, but soon resumed his travels. He left his eldest son (Henry Jr.) in a Virginia boarding school in October, and proceeded to Augusta, Georgia to attend the first General Council of the Protestant Episcopal Church in the Confederate States of America.

After the council, Lay returned to Arkansas by himself, though by now neighboring Indian territory was under Federal control. By January 1863, he had settled at Little Rock, which served as the base for the Confederate Trans-Mississippi Department. The city had five improvised army hospitals, and Lay dismantled the interior of Christ Church and with his parishioners turned it into the sixth. In the late spring 1863, Lay made a 30-day, 400-mile horseback trip of his diocese, and by early summer began substituting in Louisiana for Bishop Polk, who had become a Confederate General (called the "Fighting Bishop"). With the fall of Vicksburg, crossing the Mississippi River into Arkansas had become dangerous. Lay learned his family had returned to Lunenburg County, Virginia, so he returned to Virginia and for several months visited the hospitals and prisons there.

In June, 1864, at the invitation of Stephen Elliott, Confederate Presiding Bishop and Bishop of Georgia, Lay traveled to Fort Sumter to hold services for the Confederate garrison, as well as to attend Polk's funeral in Augusta and serve Charleston's citizens and soldiers. During the siege of Atlanta, Georgia, he visited the troops defending the city and those in its hospitals. He assisted chaplain Charles Todd Quintard in the months after Polk's death, and also counseled General Hood. After the city fell, General William Sherman gave Lay permission to cross Union lines to visit his wife and return.

Lay traveled by trains and boats north through Chattanooga, Nashville, Louisville, Cincinnati, Harrisburg, and Baltimore. He even managed to visit Union Generals Ulysses Grant and George Meade at City Point under a flag of truce during the Confederacy's final months. Lay preached to Confederate troops near Petersburg, and met with Robert E. Lee. Lay's efforts to negotiate an end to the war were unsuccessful, and moved his family to Lincolnton, North Carolina.

After the war, Federal detectives arrested Lay as he was vesting for a service at St. Luke's Church. He was taken to Washington, D.C., where he was interrogated about papers written by Alabama's Confederate Senator Clement C. Clay which they had found in the Confederate War Department's files. Lay was then released, provided with train fare home, and managed to reach Lincolnton in time to for the birth of another daughter on September 25, 1865. Four days later he left for the General Convention in Philadelphia, Pennsylvania.

== Post-War episcopate ==
At the first General Convention after the war, held at the Church of St. Luke in Philadelphia, Lay, along with Thomas Atkinson, Bishop of North Carolina, resumed their seats in the House of Bishops after several conferences with John Henry Hopkins, Presiding Bishop and Bishop of Vermont; and Horatio Potter, Bishop of New York; helping to reunite the divided Episcopal church. James Hervey Otey, Bishop of Tennessee, and Leonidas Polk, Bishop of Louisiana, had died; Richard Hooker Wilmer, Bishop of Alabama, was under house arrest for instructing his clergy not to pray for the President of the United States as part of his opposition to military rule. Thomas F. Davis, Bishop of South Carolina, opposed reunion, and was blind and nearly infirm, and so did not attend. Three other Confederate bishops took a wait-and-see attitude and chose not to travel to Philadelphia: Elliot, Bishop of Georgia; John Johns, Bishop of Virginia; and William Mercer Green, Bishop of Mississippi. The House of Deputies debated condemnatory resolutions, but did not pass them. Instead, the deputies passed a simple resolution of thanksgiving for the restoration of peace in the country and unity in the Church. The General Convention also affirmed Wilmer's election, notwithstanding his arrest, and also that of Charles Todd Quintard as Bishop of Tennessee

Although Lay had submitted his resignation as Missionary Bishop to Thomas Church Brownell, Presiding Bishop and Bishop of Connecticut, in 1861, it was never acted upon before Brownell died in January 1865. Thus, after the General Convention still acknowledged Lay as Bishop of the Missionary District of the Southwest, he returned to his diocese, landing at Helena, Arkansas circa 3 a.m. on December 31, 1865. Disappointed to find "not one open church, not one clergyman officiating," Lay rallied the impoverished and discouraged congregations and convinced clergy to return. He also left temporarily to attend the First Lambeth Conference in 1867. In 1868, the diocese held a convention. However, Lay realized he no longer had the physical strength to perform fully the duties of a missionary bishop, and had accepted the position of the first bishop of the newly created Episcopal Diocese of Easton. His flock gave their departing bishop the altar cross from the century-old parish in Pine Bluff, Arkansas, inscribed with the last verse of Psalm 78: "So he fed them according to the integrity of his heart; and guided them by the skillfulness of his hands.

== Easton episcopate ==
Lay began service on Maryland's Eastern Shore on April 1, 1869.

The new diocese was agricultural and maritime, in many ways similar to his first parish assignment. Lay worked to repair the aged and decaying churches within the diocese, and also secured the land to form a small cathedral complex at Easton, since the diocese even lacked housing for him and his travels in Europe convinced him of the advantages of having such a complex (despite the practice of the Diocese of Virginia where he had been raised and other Southern dioceses). Lay also worked to provide for aged priests, serving for many years as trustee of the general clergy relief fund. In 1877, he addressed the General Convention in Boston.

== Retirement years ==
About 1880, Bishop Lay retired and began writing and publishing extensively, for church and popular audiences. His first book, Letters to a Man Bewildered Among Many Counsellors, had already been published in four editions by the Church Book Society in 1854. The same publisher in 1860 issued two volumes of short sermons and tracts entitled Tracts for Missionary Use. In 1872, W. Wells Gardner in London published Studies in the Church: being letters to an old-fashioned layman. During his final years at Easton, Lay traveled to deliver sermons, lectures and eulogies outside his diocese, including of his friend Atkinson in 1881. Some are readily available through Project Canterbury. Studies in the Church was published in 1881. His last book, The Church in the Nation: God's Pure and Apostolical, God's Authorized Representative, was published by E.P. Dutton Co. in the year of Lay's death.

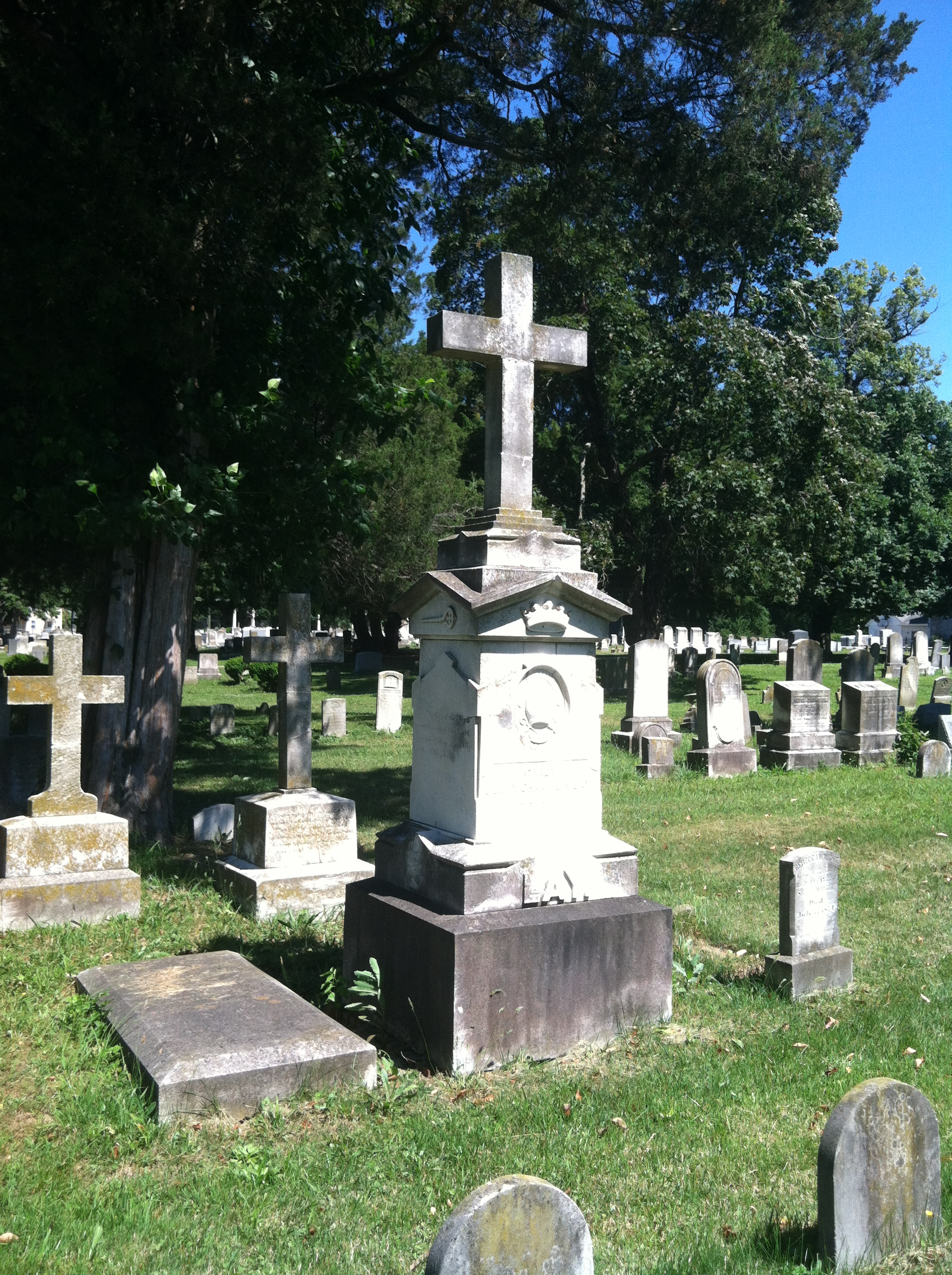
Lay's memorial

== Death and legacy ==
Lay died on September 17, 1885, at the Church Home in Baltimore after years of poor health, culminated by a lingering illness. Three days later, after a viewing in the unfinished Trinity Cathedral which he had begun (and which was completed in the decades after his death), and a funeral service attended by the bishops of Maryland and Delaware, Henry C. Lay was buried in Spring Hill Cemetery in Easton, Maryland.

His family later donated his papers, including his extensive correspondence with his wife during his travels, to the University of North Carolina. His traveling communion set from his days as missionary bishop, and other artifacts, were left with the Diocese of Easton, where they are often displayed at Bray House.

== Family ==
Lay married Eliza Withers Atkinson of Lunenburg County, Virginia, niece of Atkinson, on May 13, 1847. The couple had three sons who survived their parents—Henry C. Lay, Jr (who became a civil engineer, 1850–1914), George William Lay (who became a priest, 1860–1932), and Beirne Lay (Yale graduate and writer)--and a daughter, Louisa Lay (1866–1906), who remained in Easton. His grandson Beirne Lay, Jr. became an early Army aviator, and writer in response to the Air Mail Scandal, then distinguished himself in World War II and later as a screenwriter.
