= Martin G. Townsend =

English-American bishop

The Right Reverend Martin Gough Townsend D.D.
- Bishop of Easton
- Church: Episcopal Church
- Diocese: Easton
- Elected: June 11, 1992
- In office: 1993–2001
- Predecessor: Elliott L. Sorge
- Successor: James J. Shand
- Previous post: Coadjutor Bishop of Easton (1992-1993)

Orders
- Ordination: 1969 by Ned Cole
- Consecration: November 21, 1992 by Edmond L. Browning

Personal details
- Born: August 7, 1943 (age 82) Cambridge, Cambridgeshire, England
- Denomination: Anglican
- Parents: Frederick & Nora Townsend
- Spouse: Barbara Gunderman
- Children: 3

Martin Gough Townsend (born August 7, 1943) was bishop of the Episcopal Diocese of Easton, Maryland, United States, serving from 1993 to 2001.

== Biography ==
Townsend was born on August 7, 1943, in Cambridge, England, the second of three sons of Frederick and Nora Townsend. In 1957, his family moved to the United States and he attended Notre Dame High School in Elmira, New York. He then studied at Hobart College and graduated with a Bachelor of Arts in 1965. In 1968 he also graduated with a Master of Divinity from the Virginia Theological Seminary.

Townsend was ordained deacon in 1968 and priest in 1969 by Bishop Ned Cole for the Diocese of Central New York. He then became assistant priest at St Paul's Cathedral in Syracuse, New York. Between 1971 and 1977, he became rector of St Christopher's Church in New Carrollton, Maryland. In 1987 he moved to Blacksburg, Virginia to serve as rector of Christ Church.

Townsend was elected Coadjutor Bishop of Easton on June 11, 1992, on the third ballot of a special diocesan convention. He was consecrated on November 21, 1992, in Salisbury, Maryland by Presiding Bishop Edmond L. Browning. He succeeded as diocesan bishop in 1993 and retired in 2001.
