= Christ Church (Easton, Maryland) =

Christ Church, Easton
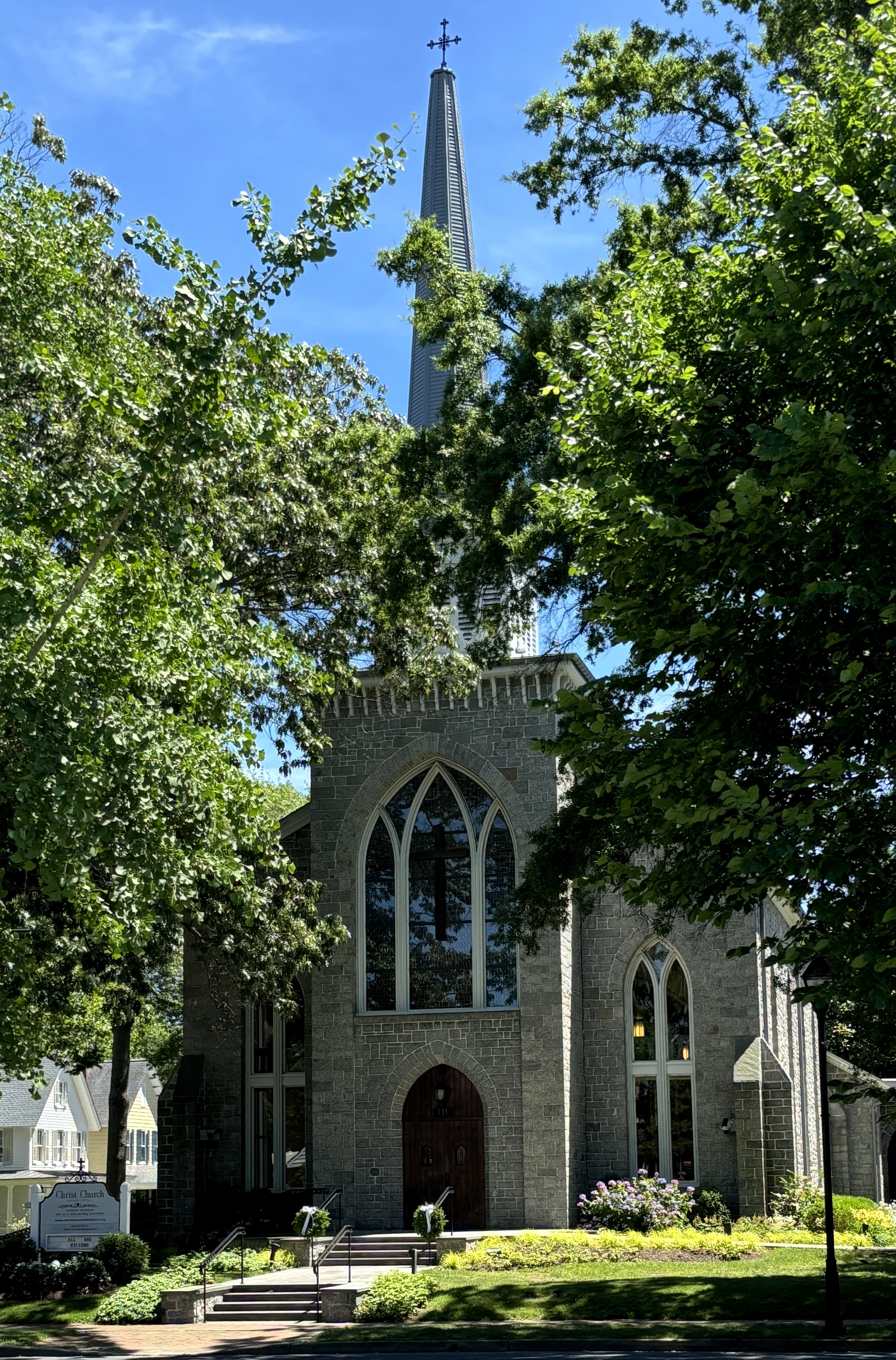
- Christ Church in 2024
- Christ Church, Easton
- Location: 111 Harrison St. Easton, Maryland
- Country: United States
- Denomination: Episcopal Church in the United States of America
- Website: www.christchurcheaston.org

History
- Founded: 1840

Administration
- Diocese: Diocese of Easton

Christ Church, St. Peter's Parish is an historic Episcopal church located in Easton, Talbot County, Maryland U.S.A.

== History ==
Christ Church was for many years the parish church of St. Peter's Parish, founded at some time before 1687, as one of the List of original 30 Anglican parishes in the Province of Maryland. The parish initially "begins at John Judwins Branch and extends to Oxford Town" but the boundaries were revised to include Third Haven Hundred, Bolingbroke Hundred and part of Tuckahoe Hundred" around 1714, since a church had been erected in Oxford, Maryland by 1695.

The original parish church was at White Marsh near Hambleton, which was built around 1666 but destroyed by a brush fire during a cleanup in 1897. The parish's first rector was Huguenot refugee Daniel Maynadier, who fled to England and became an Anglican priest after the Edict of Nantes, and after emigrating across the Atlantic Ocean served as the parish's rector from 1716 to 1745. Thomas Bacon, who served as rector from 1746 to 1758, when he moved to All Saints' Parish (Frederick, Maryland), worked diligently to improve religious instruction of slaves and support charity schools. He resigned this parish in favor of Rev. Thornton, and to serve the enormous parish which covered rapidly developing western Maryland.

Robert Morris, an English tobacco merchant who lived at Oxford (from 1747 to 1750) bequeathed fifty pounds to be used to benefit the poor of this parish. The father of Founding Father Robert Morris, he was buried in the churchyard.

The current church, which remains in use today, was built in 1840. After the American Civil War, the Episcopal Diocese of Easton was created, to better serve Episcopalians living on Maryland's Eastern Shore. The first bishop, Henry C. Lay, bought a house in Easton, and used it as his base, although he also worked to create a cathedral complex for the new diocese and traveled fairly extensively to deliver speeches despite personal health issues. That became Trinity Cathedral (Easton, Maryland), erected after his death.

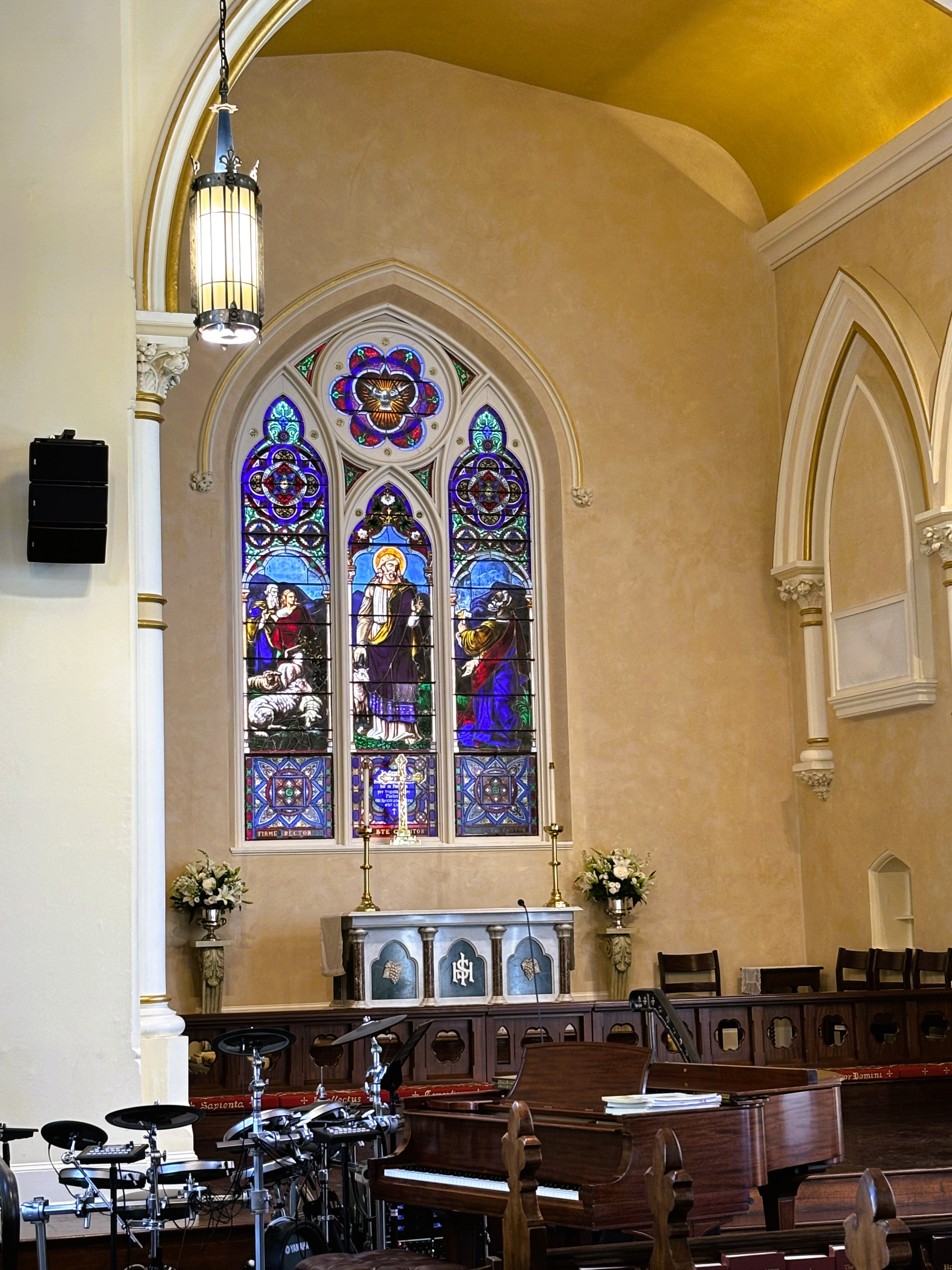
Chancel

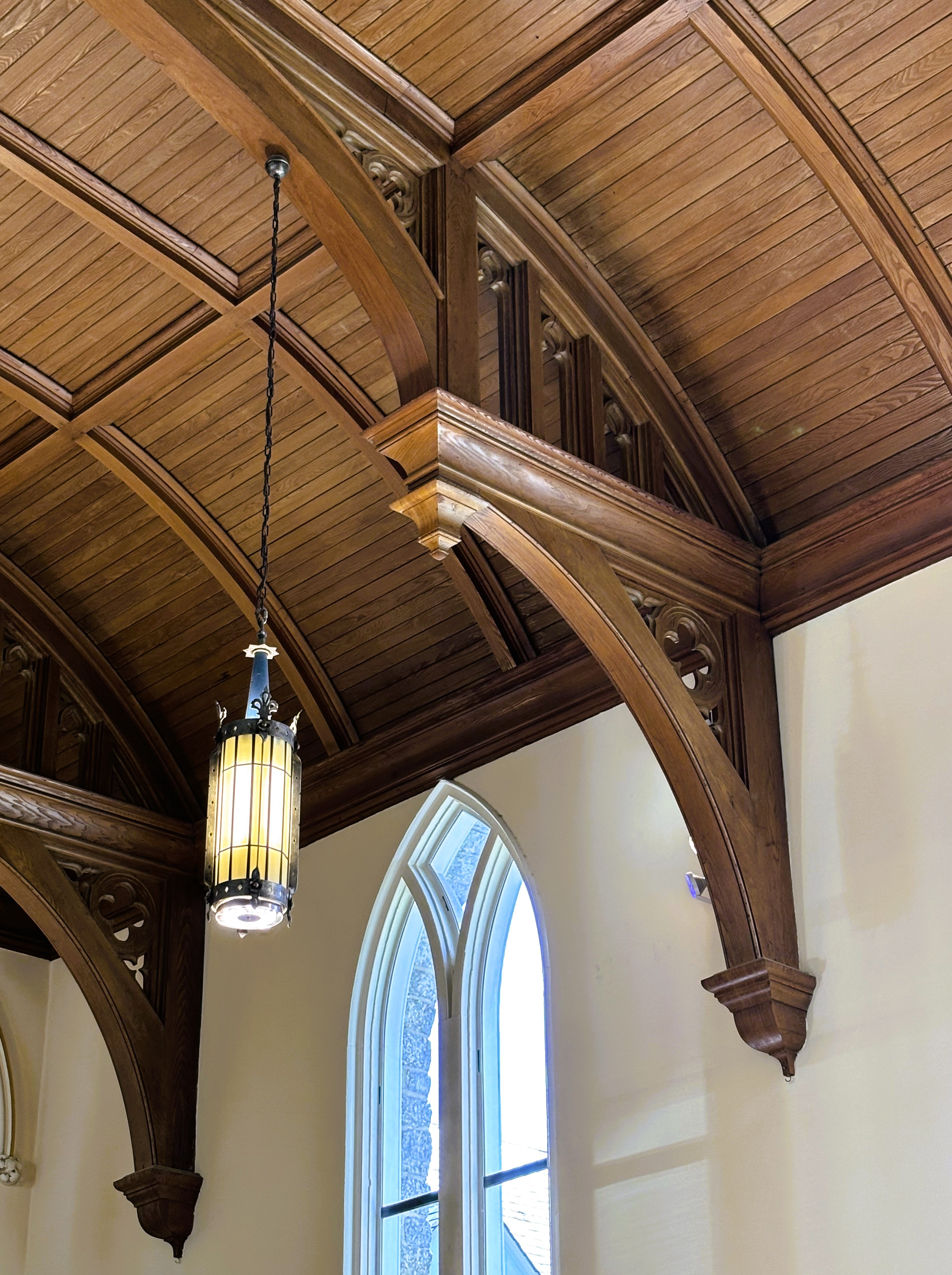
Ceiling

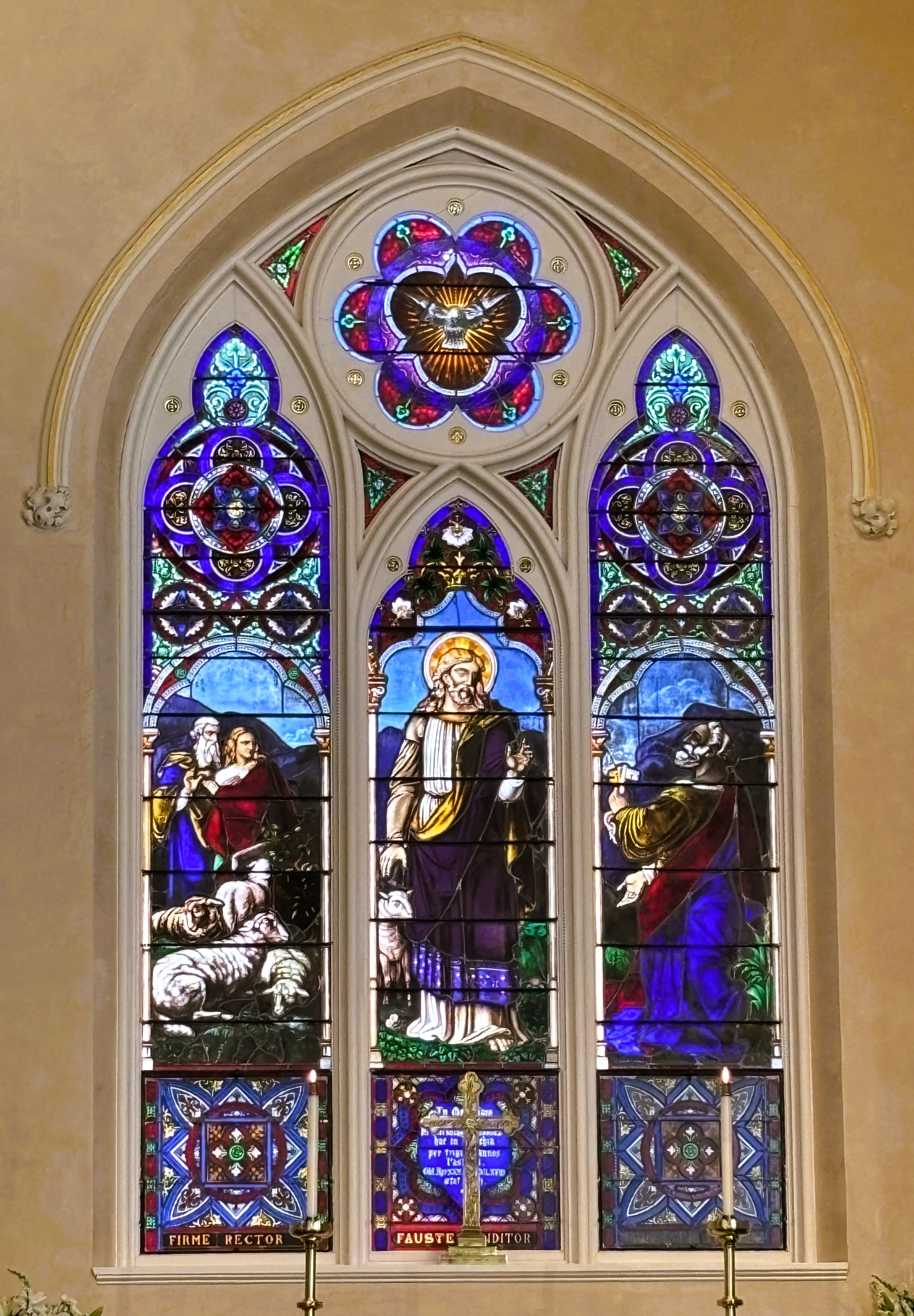
Stained glass window

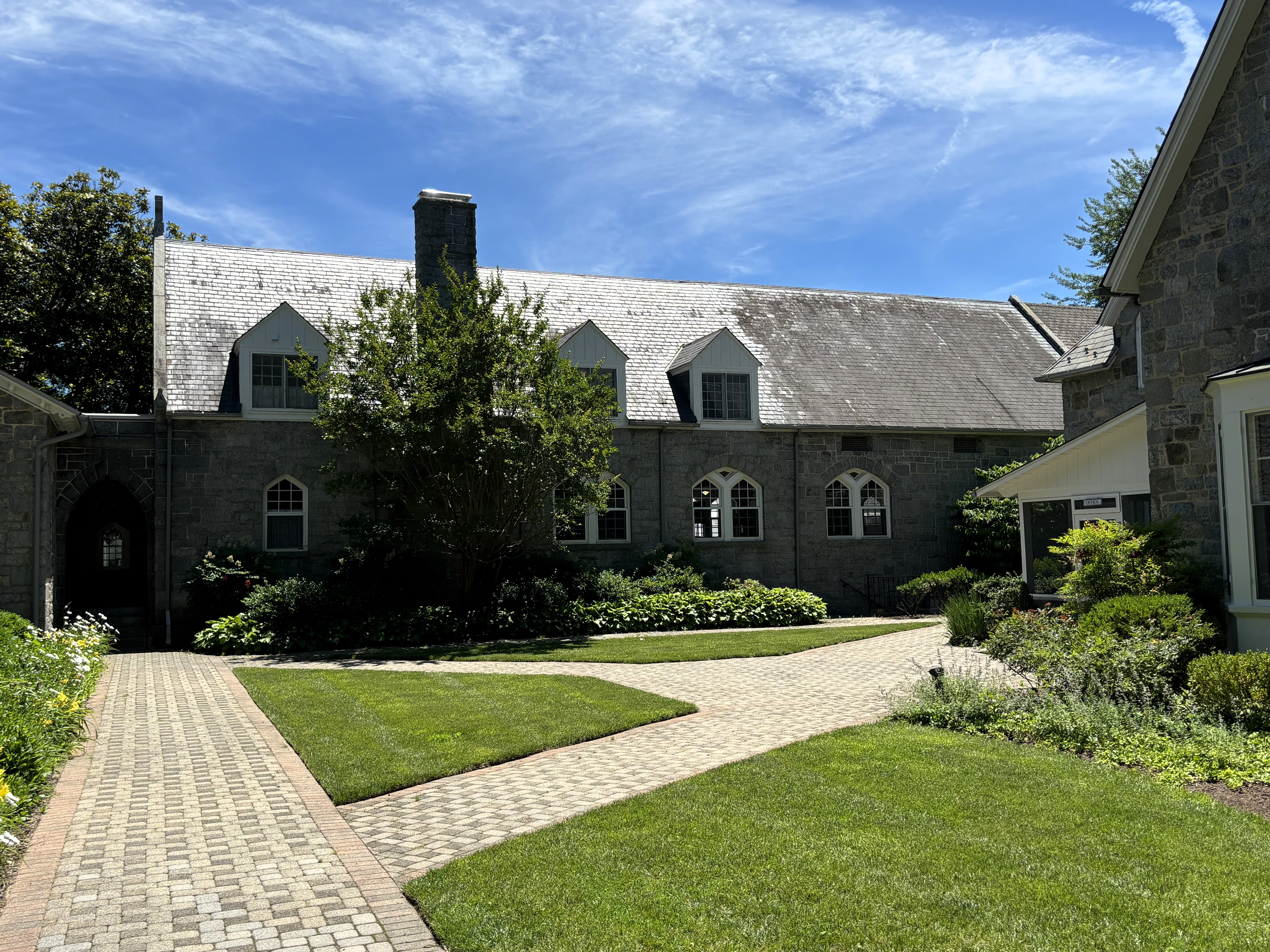
Parish House

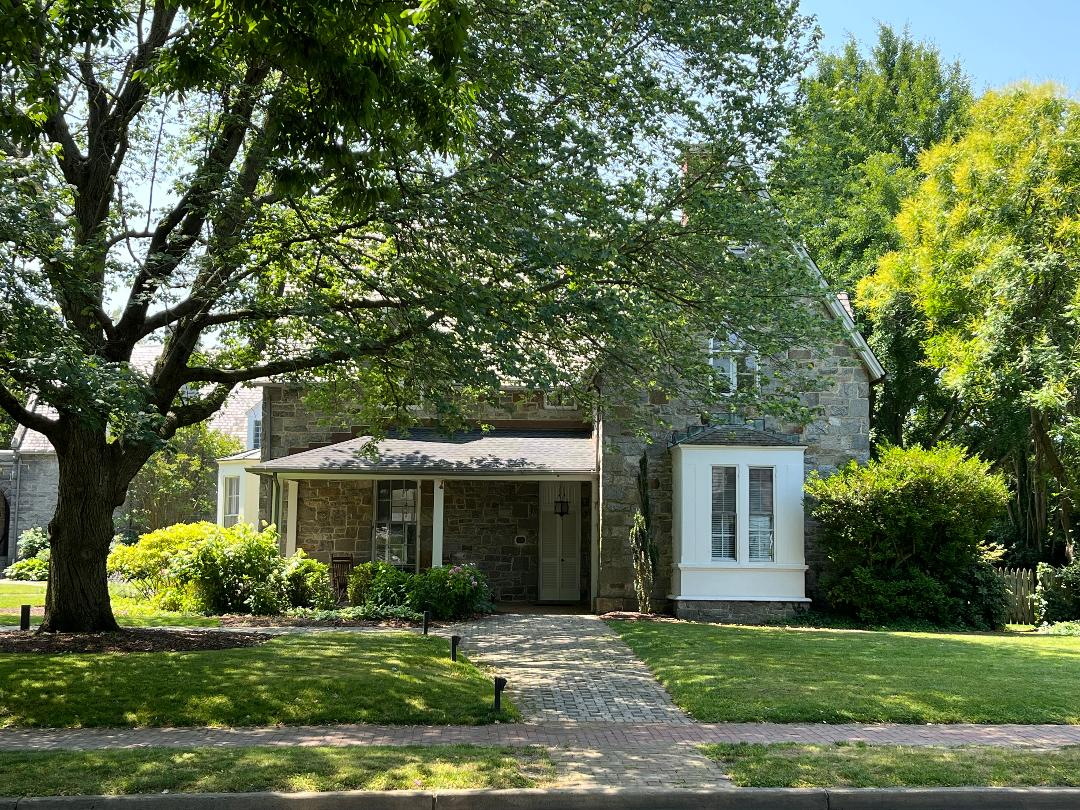
Richard Upjohn designed rectory
