= Trinity Cathedral (Easton, Maryland) =

Historic church in Maryland, United States

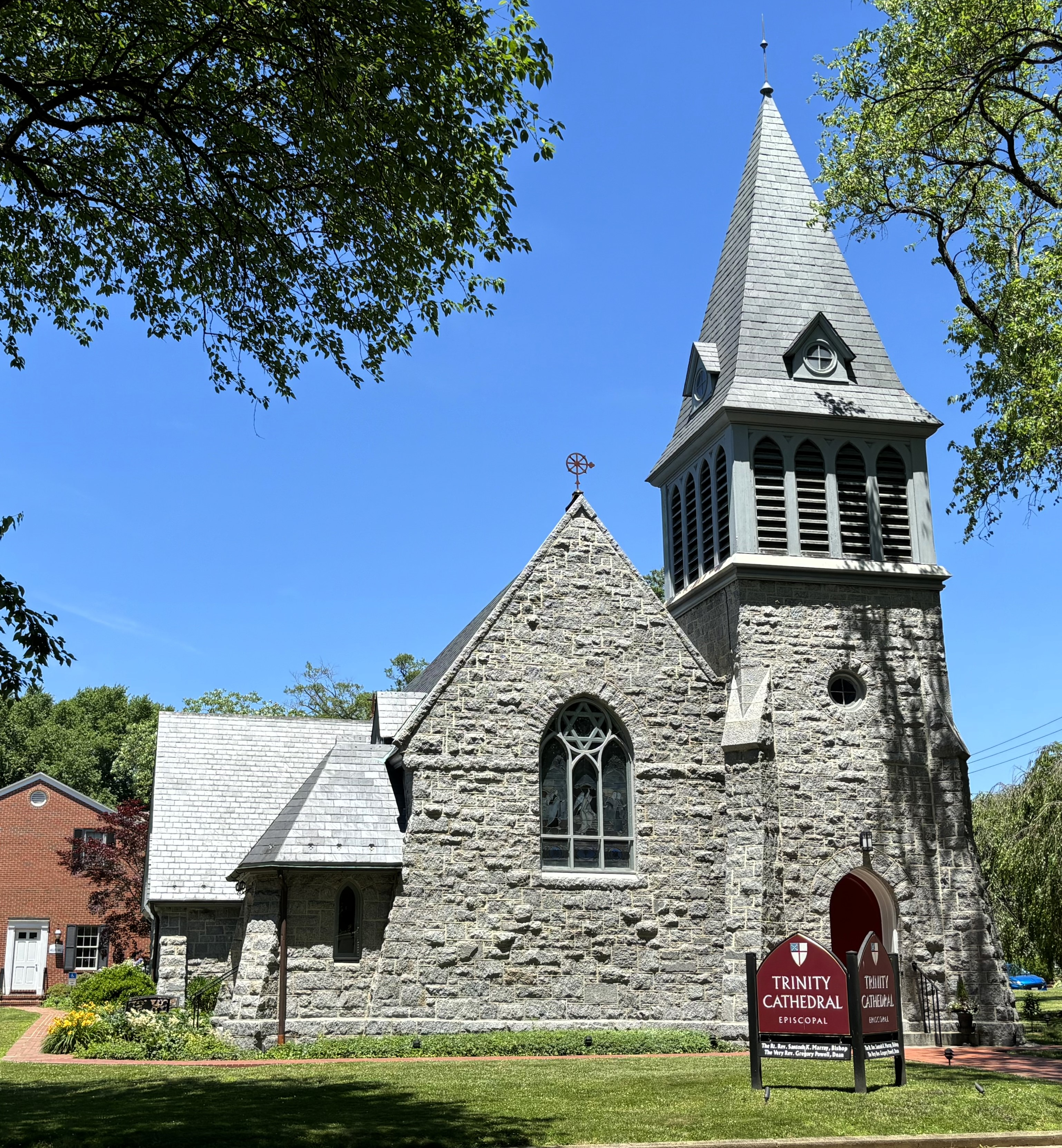
- Trinity Cathedral in 2024

- Location within Maryland Location within the United States
- 38°46′34.36″N 76°4′14.02″W
- Location: 315 Goldsborough St. Easton, Maryland
- Country: United States
- Denomination: Episcopal Church in the United States of America
- Website: www.trinitycathedraleaston.com

History
- Founded: 1891
- Consecrated: May 25, 1894

Architecture
- Style: Gothic Revival

Specifications
- Materials: Granite

Administration
- Diocese: Easton

Clergy
- Dean: The Very Rev. Gregory L. Powell
- Trinity Cathedral
- U.S. Historic district – Contributing property
- Part of: Easton Historic District (ID80001835)
- Added to NRHP: September 17, 1980

Trinity Cathedral is an Episcopal cathedral located in Easton, Maryland, United States. It is the seat of the Diocese of Easton. In 1980 it was included as a contributing property in the Easton Historic District, which is listed on the National Register of Historic Places.

The cathedral reported 279 members in 2018 and 93 members in 2025. Plate and pledge income for the congregation in 2025 was $300,417 with average Sunday attendance (ASA) of 70. This was a relative decrease from ASA of 123 persons reported in 2015.

== History ==
The Rt. Rev. Henry Champlin Lay, the first Bishop of Easton, desired a cathedral for his young diocese. The original plans called for a complex of buildings that included a church, diocesan offices, a library, and a bishop's residence. The buildings were designed to be grouped around a courtyard similar to a traditional English cathedral. Construction on the church was begun in 1891. The granite for the exterior was said to have been shipped by water from Port Deposit, Maryland. While not completed, the first services were held the following year. Except for the spire, the church building was completed in 1894. It was consecrated on May 25 of that year and was put into service as the diocesan cathedral. The stained glass windows date from 1891 to 1979 and reflect the different styles over that time period. The spire on the tower was completed in 1978. The bell that hangs in the tower was cast in the Philippines. It originally hung in the Chapel of the Epiphany in Preston, Maryland.

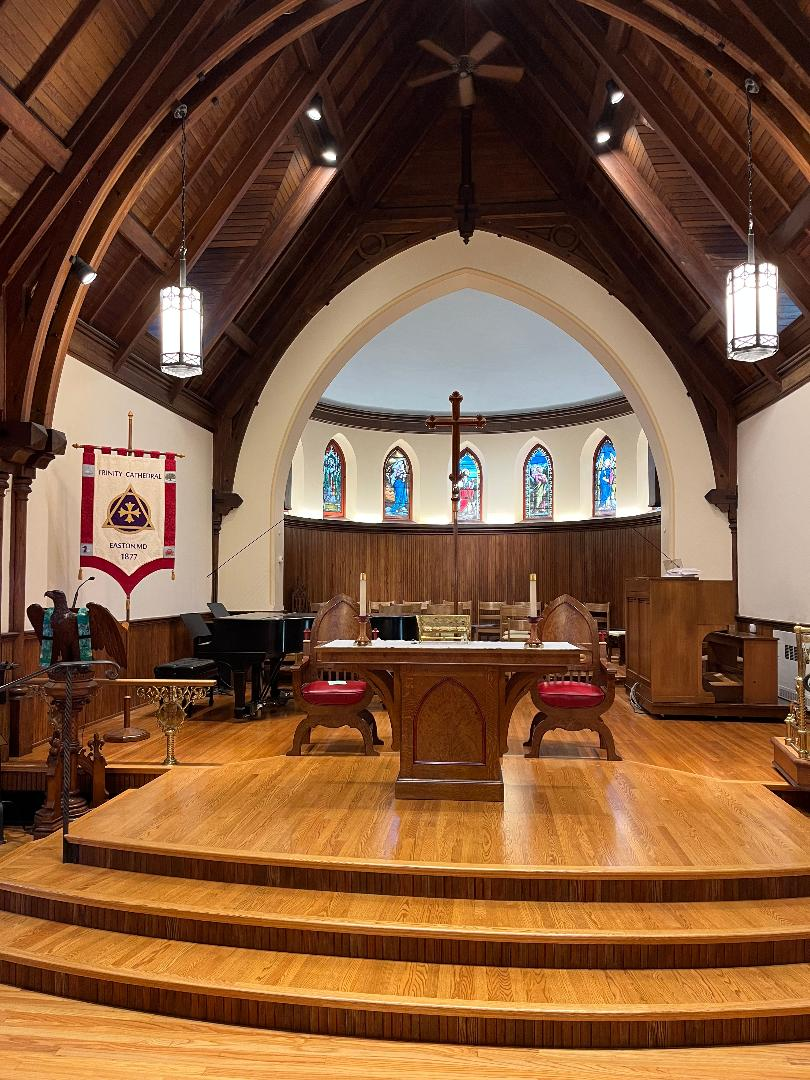
Chancel

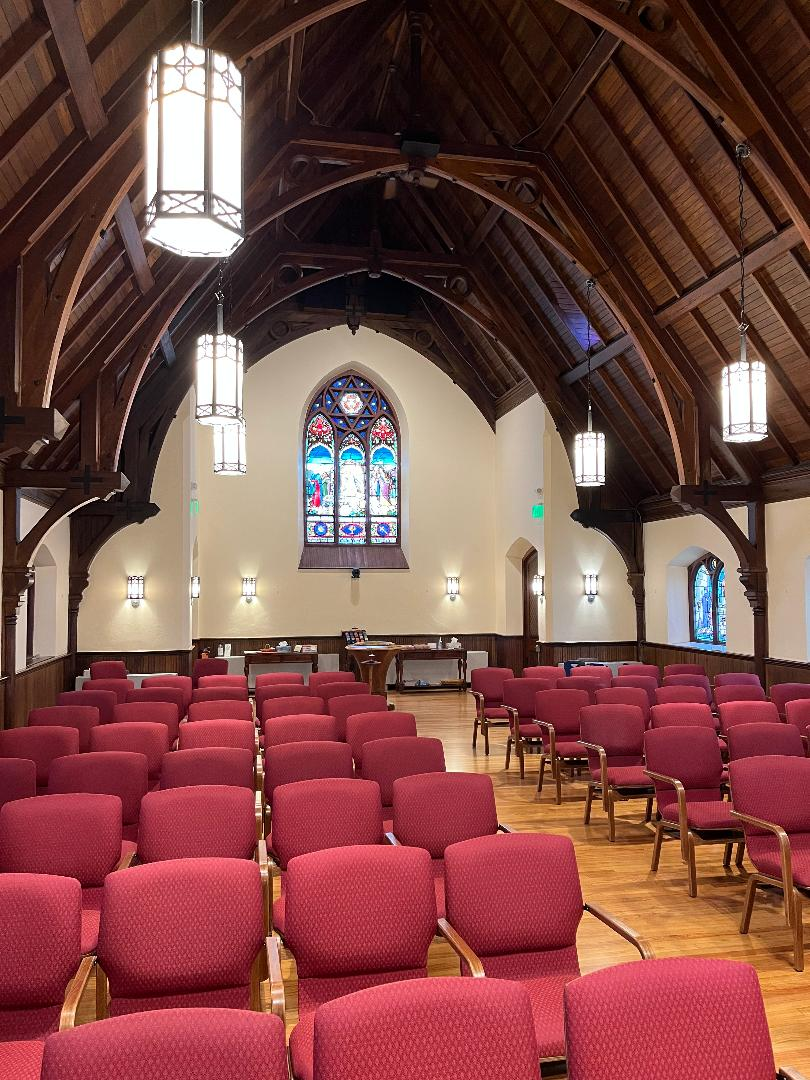
Nave

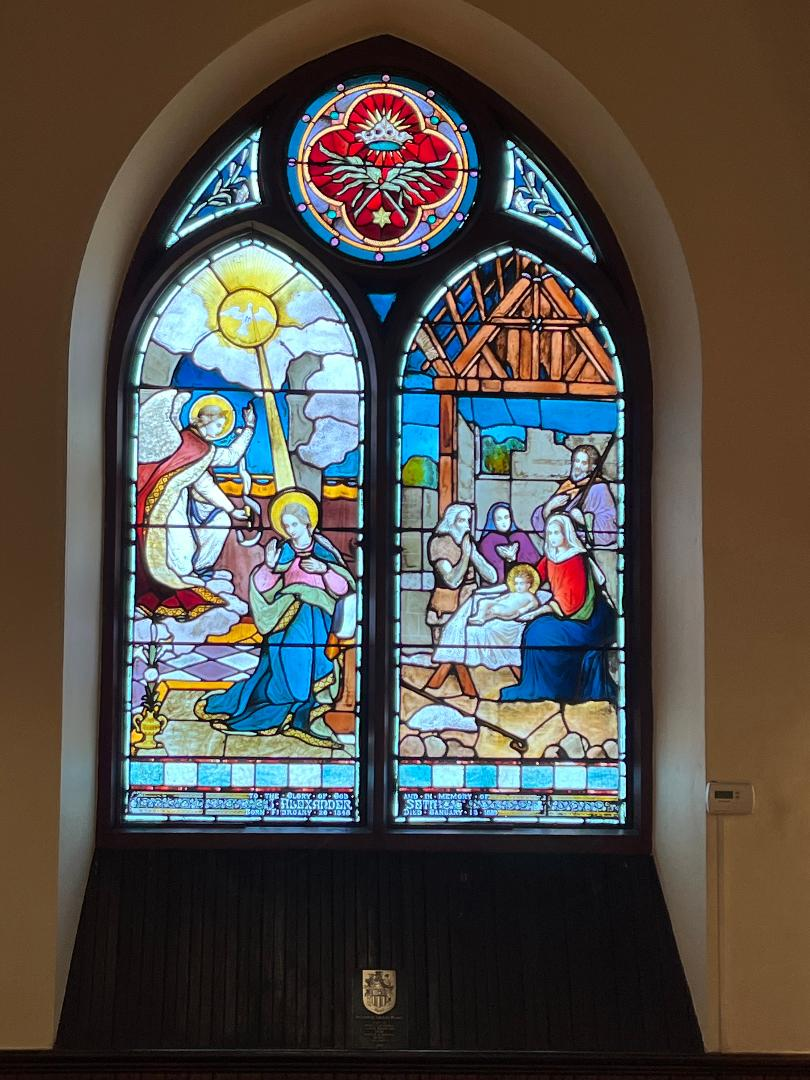
Stained glass window

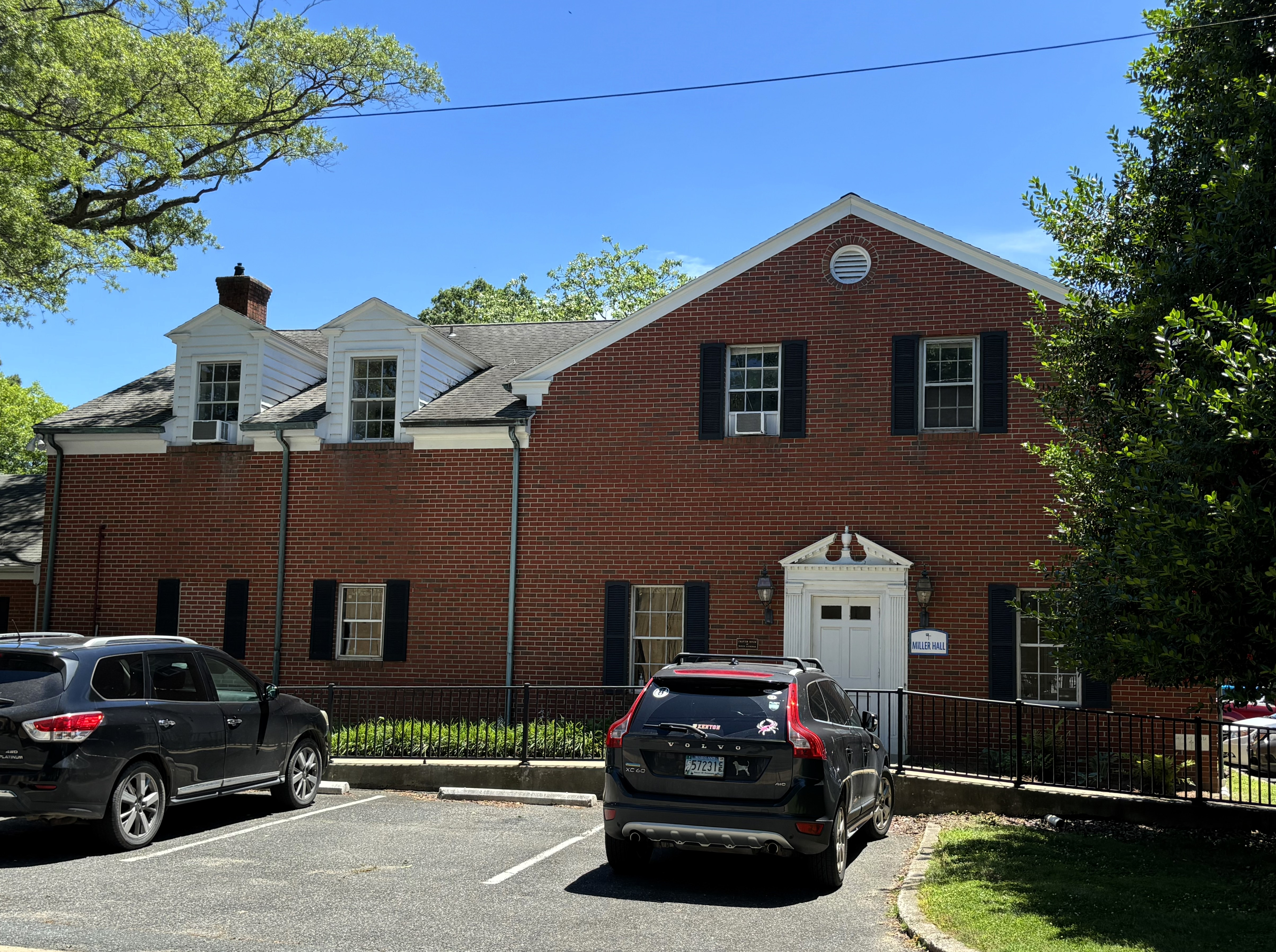
Miller Hall

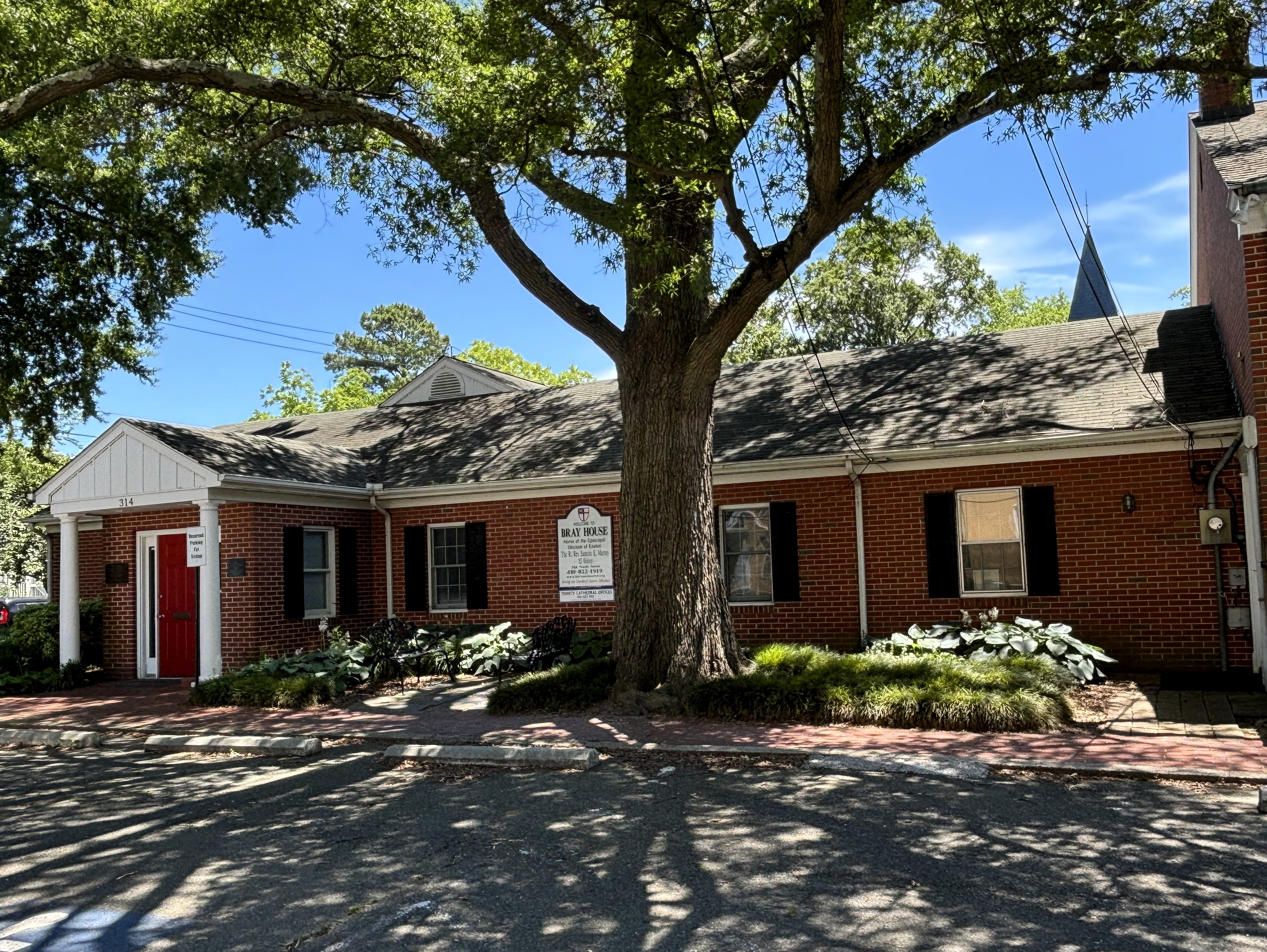
Bray House

== See also ==
- George A. Taylor (bishop)
