= Episcopal Diocese of Easton =

Episcopal Church diocese in the US

Coordinates: 38°58′49.3″N 76°18′50.7″W

Diocese of Easton

Location
- Country: United States
- Territory: Eastern Shore of Maryland
- Ecclesiastical province: Province III

Statistics
- Congregations: 38 (2024)
- Members: 6,620 (2025)

Information
- Denomination: Episcopal Church
- Established: November 19, 1868
- Cathedral: Trinity Cathedral

Current leadership
- Bishop: (assisting bishop)

Map
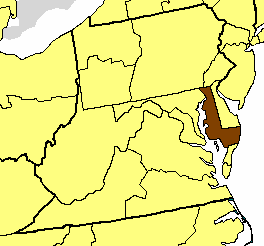
- Location of the Diocese of Easton

Website
- www.dioceseofeaston.org

The Episcopal Diocese of Easton is a diocese of the Episcopal Church in the United States of America that comprises the nine counties that make up the Eastern Shore of Maryland. It is in Province III (the Middle Atlantic region) and was created as a split from the Diocese of Maryland in 1868.

The diocese consists of the Eastern Shore of Maryland (the nine counties of Caroline, Cecil, Dorchester, Kent, Queen Anne's, Somerset, Talbot, Wicomico, and Worcester). There are 38 parishes and missions in the diocese. Its largest cities are Salisbury, Ocean City, and Easton, the centrally located city from which the diocese takes its name and where Trinity Cathedral, the bishop's seat, is located. Camp Wright, the diocesan camp, is located in Stevensville. Christ Episcopal Church of Kent Island, the oldest Christian congregation in Maryland, is a part of the diocese, and is also located in Stevensville.

The diocese reported 8,004 members in 2015 and 6,620 members in 2025. Plate and pledge income for the 38 filing congregations of the diocese in 2025 was $5,343,370. Average Sunday attendance (ASA) reported in 2025 was 1,558 persons, a decrease from 2,530 in 2015.

== Bishops ==
- 1. Henry Champlin Lay, (1869–1885)
- 2. William Forbes Adams, (1887-1920)
- 3. George William Davenport, (1920-1938)
- 4. William McClelland, (1939-1949)
- 5. Allen Jerome Miller, (1949-1966)
- 6. George Alfred Taylor, (1967-1975)
- 7. William Moultrie Moore, Jr., (1975-1983)
- 8. Elliott Lorenz Sorge, (1983-1993)
- 9. Martin Gough Townsend, (1993-2001)
- 10. James Joseph Shand, (2003-2014)
- Henry N. Parsley, Jr., Provisional Bishop (2014-2016)
- 11. Santosh Kumar Marray, (2016-present; announced retirement for 2026).
