= St. Michaels Historic District =

Historic district in Maryland, United States

- U.S. National Register of Historic Places
- U.S. Historic district
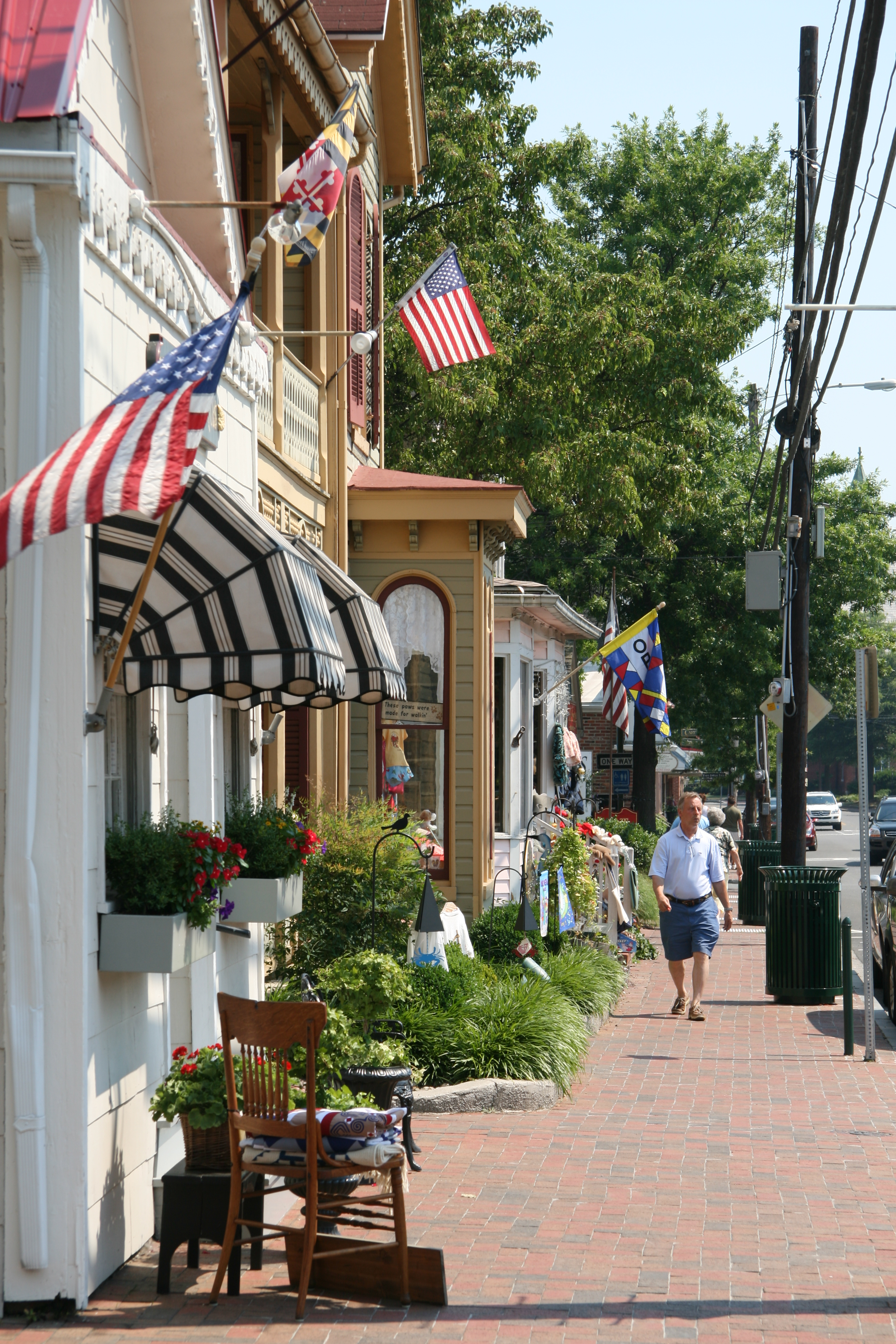

- Location within Maryland Location within the United States
- Location: Saint Michaels, Maryland
- Coordinates: 38°47′4″N 76°13′24″W
- Area: 105 acres (42 ha)
- Built: 1778
- Architectural style: Italianate, Gothic Revival, Federal
- NRHP reference No.: 86002427
- Added to NRHP: September 11, 1986

The Saint Michaels Historic District encompasses the historic center of Saint Michaels, Maryland. The town, which has about 1,000 permanent residents, is on a tributary to the Chesapeake Bay on the Eastern Shore of Maryland. After over 100 years as a center for trade and shipbuilding, the community was incorporated as a town in 1805. Shipbuilding peaked in 1820, and the town's economy became focused more on oyster and seafood collection and packing. In the 1970s, the town transitioned to tourism.

In the original 1986 nomination form, the Saint Michaels Historic District consisted of 362 buildings, sites, and structures. Sixty of the buildings were noncontributing. Many of the structures were originally constructed in the 19th century, and used the Federal, Gothic Revival, or Italianate architectural styles. The entire town has a 19th-century appearance, and much of the Historic District can be observed by walking. The homes that contribute to the Historic District are privately owned, but many have been converted into bed and breakfasts.

The Chesapeake Maritime Museum is located along the Miles River and St. Michaels Harbor, in the northeast corner of the Historic District and further north. It features Chesapeake Bay exhibits such as ship building and oystering. The small Saint Michaels Museum is located within the Historic District at Saint Mary's Square. It focuses on 19th-century Saint Michaels, and conducts walking tours of the Historic District. Talbot Street (Maryland Route 33) is the major street in Saint Michaels, and runs north–south through the Historic District. The street is lined with shops and restaurants housed in 19th-century buildings.

== Background ==
Saint Michaels is a small nautical-themed town on Maryland's Eastern Shore. It is situated along the Miles River, which leads to Chesapeake Bay. (Note: The Miles River was named Saint Michaels River at one time. The word "Miles" is thought to be a shortened version of "Michaels".) Boaters can get to the town's St. Michaels Harbor from nearby rivers or the Chesapeake Bay. Traveling by automobile from major cities such as Annapolis or Baltimore, the most direct route to the Eastern Shore involves crossing the bay using the Chesapeake Bay Bridge. Saint Michaels is part of Talbot County, and accessible by automobile via Maryland Route 33. In town, the road is known as Talbot Street and is the only road that passes through town. The town's Historic District is lined with shops and restaurants usually housed in well-preserved 19th century architecture. The Saint Michaels Historic District is located in the center of town, and was added to the National Register on September 11, 1986.

=== Beginning ===
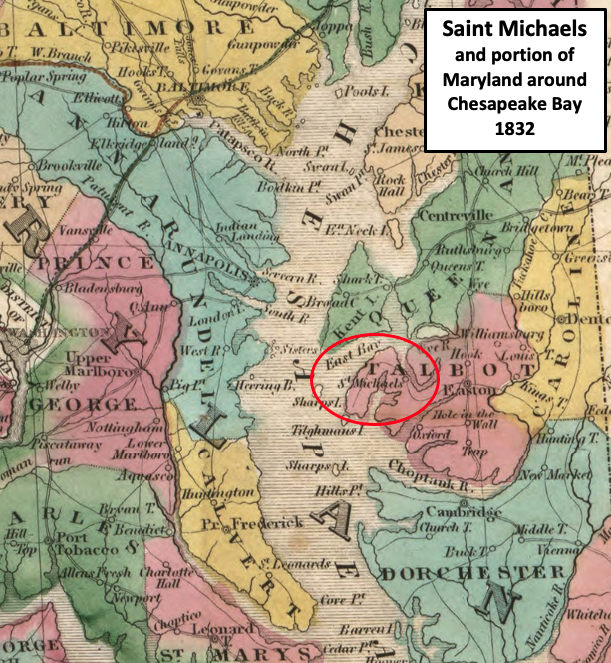
St. Michaels and southern Maryland in 1832

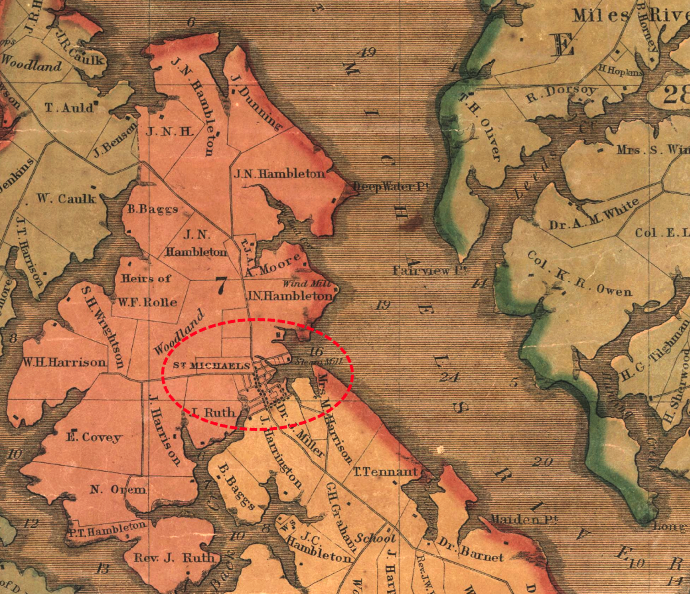
St. Michaels in 1858

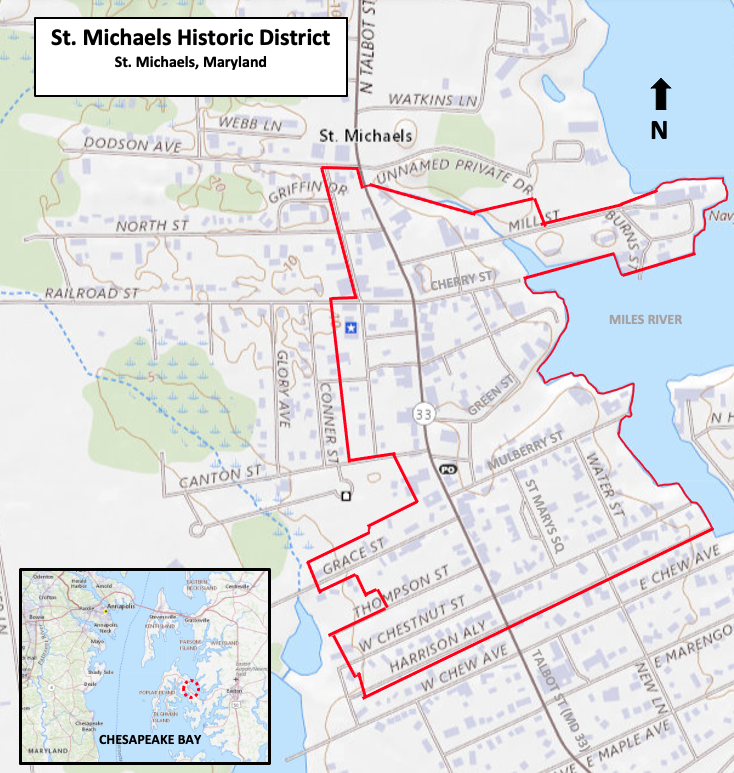
St. Michaels Historic District

The community that became Saint Michaels began in the mid-1600s as a trading post for tobacco farmers and trappers who took advantage of the deep–water port's access to the Chesapeake Bay. The Christ Episcopal Church of St Michael Archangel parish was founded during the 1600s, and built a church near the Saint Michaels River (later named Miles River) and Broad Creek. This was the first building erected in the area. The church's location meant that it could easily be reached by boat, which was convenient for the early settlers who typically lived along the banks of area creeks and coves. The exact date the first church building was constructed is unknown. There is evidence it was built by at least 1672, and the structure had decayed enough that it was replaced in 1736. A list of baptisms dating from 1672 to 1704 includes family names such as Arnett, Auld, Banning, Benson, Blades, Dawson, Harrison, Kemp, Merchant, and others.

A small village grew near the church and harbor, inhabited mostly by craftsman involved in building or refitting ships plus shopkeepers who catered to the needs of the craftsman and sailors. The village of about 100 people had no government other than the general laws of the province. As the place where people congregated, the church took on the additional role of a place to meet for business. The community's name, Saint Michaels, came from the church name. The harbor of Saint Michaels became a place large English vessels brought goods for trade.

=== Town of Saint Michaels ===
In 1778, British land agent James Braddock, working for Gildart and Gawith and Company of Liverpool (James Gildart and John Gawith), acquired much of the land near what became the town of Saint Michaels. He had a surveyor measure a portion of his land into lots that were sold, including what became the town's public square. After his death in 1783, John Thompson gained control of Braddock's land and more plots were sold. Another prominent member of the community was Thomas Harrison, who was involved with importing goods from England and exporting tobacco and other goods from the area. Upon his death in 1802, his son Samuel continued the business.

Between 1804 and 1806 the village was re-surveyed and platted as three squares (or wards) plus the public square: Harrison's square at the north end, Thompson's square to the southwest, Braddock's square to the southeast end, and the public square known as Saint Mary's square. In 1804, community members petitioned the General Assembly of the state for a charter for a corporate town named Saint Michaels. The petition was ratified on January 19, 1805, and became law. Robert Dodson, John Dorgan, James Boid, and Thomas S. Haddaway were the town's original commissioners. The new town's commissioners did not begin to execute their duties until 1807, and William Merchant replaced James Boid. Jason Dodson was added to the group of commissioners. Town boundaries were marked and streets were named. Among the names used were Cherry, Chestnut, Locust, Mill, Mulberry, Talbot, Water, and Willow.

=== Clippers and war ===
The Chesapeake Bay, with its access to Baltimore and Washington (via the Potomac River), was a major commercial waterway in the early 1800s—making it an obvious target for the British in their fight against the United States in the War of 1812. Clipper ships, which were fast but could not carry large amounts of cargo, were used for fighting and evading the British. It is thought that the design for Baltimore clippers had its beginning in Saint Michaels. Master builder Thomas Kemp left Saint Michaels in 1803 to start his own shipbuilding business in Baltimore. He purchased property at Baltimore's Fells Point two years later, and worked in shipbuilding and repair. His most famous clipper was the Chasseur, which was launched in December 1812 and one of the fastest ships of its time. When an economic recession happened after the war, Kemp moved back to his Wade's Point farm near Saint Michaels.

The town of Easton, county seat of Talbot County, was the largest town on Maryland's Eastern Shore and contained one of Maryland's four armories, making it a target for the British during the war. Boats and small vessels could use the Saint Michaels River to get within three miles (4.8 km) of Easton. Saint Michaels, located on the mouth of the same river, was also a target because it was an outport for Easton and because of its shipbuilding. The British conducted raids on St. Michaels twice in 1813. Local militia successfully defended the town in both cases.

=== Ship building ===
Ship building has been conducted in what became the town of St. Michaels since about 1670. Shipbuilding in Saint Michaels prospered from 1780 to 1820, peaking around 1810. The Harrisons, Haddaways, and Spencers, are all known to have had shipyards at or near St. Michaels in 1792. At the 1810 shipbuilding peak, John Davis, Impey Dawson, Thomas L. Haddaway, Skinner Harris, Joseph Kemp, and John Wrightson all had shipyards within St. Michaels. Colonel Perry Spencer, his brother Richard Spencer, William Harrison, and Thomas Hambleton had shipyards near the town with access to the St. Michaels River or Broad Creek (south of St. Michaels).

Prosperity declined sharply after 1820, and some of the shipbuilding moved to Baltimore. The end of the war with Great Britain and the depletion of lumber were the major reasons for the decline. Shipbuilding by that time was mostly for smaller craft, and was no longer the leading industry of Talbot County. Shipbuilding enjoyed a revival around 1840, and typically there were two shipyards in St. Michaels. At that time, steamships began to provide regular service between St. Michaels and Baltimore. Some of those packet boats were captained by members of the Dodson and Dawson families. By 1882, St. Michaels had three active shipyards, which were run by Robert Lambdin and Sons, Thomas H. Kirby and Company, and Thomas L. Dawson. These shipyards constructed smaller crafts such as coasting schooners, pungies, and bugeyes.

=== Seafood ===
After the 1820 decline of shipbuilding, the town's economy became more dependent on fishing and oystering. The construction of the Chesapeake & Delaware Canal at the northern end of the Chesapeake Bay opened new markets for oysters and seafood, causing a new prosperity for Saint Michaels starting around 1830. The town's population increased from 499 in 1840 to 1,471 by 1880. During that time, the oyster business grew beyond simply harvesting oysters. Businesses were now shucking (removing the oyster from its shell), packing and canning oysters. In 1901, the town had the J.E. Watkins Oyster House that conducted shucking, packing, and canning of oysters at Navy Point Pier. It also had George Caulk's Oyster House on the St. Michaels River. Near the river and Mulberry Street was C.W. Willey's Oyster House.

In 1902, African Americans William Coulbourne and Frederick Jewett began a seafood packing house on Navy Point that operated until 1962. Originally, the company processed fish, but eventually it focused on crab and crab meat. Jewett's method of grading crab meat is still used in the industry today. In 1955, St. Michaels had three seafood companies: Bivalve Oyster Company, Coulborne and Jewett, and Harrison and Jarboe. All three produced shucked oysters, and two produced fresh-cooked crab meat.

=== Today ===
Beginning in the 1970s, the community transformed itself to a focus on tourism. Its Chesapeake Bay Maritime Museum has approximately 95,000 visitors each year. The town is walkable and has numerous restaurants, bed and breakfasts, and shops. It has about 1,000 permanent residents. The Historic District has no traffic lights, no malls, and no major restaurant chains. The small Saint Michaels Museum at St. Mary's Square is located within the Historic District at Saint Mary's Square. Open on weekends, it focuses on 19th century Saint Michaels, and conducts walking tours of the Historic District every Saturday.

== List of structures ==
In the original 1986 nomination form, the St. Michaels Historic District consisted of 362 buildings, sites, and structures. Sixty of the buildings were noncontributing. The district is described as "a cohesive group of residential, commercial, and ecclesiastical buildings dating from the late 18th through early 20th centuries located within St. Michaels, a small town fronting the Miles River in western Talbot County, Maryland."

The sortable table of the structures that are part of the historic district follows. If the year built is a range of years, the middle of the range is used. Since there are over 300 contributing structures, the list is incomplete. However, any structure mentioned in the original application to the National Register is in the list. Some additional structures, mentioned in walking tours, have been added. Three of the structures, by themselves, are listed in the National Register of Historic Places. The Old Inn was listed in 1980, the St. Michaels Mill in 1982, and the Cannonball House in 1983.

Name	MHT Code	Street	Coordinates	Image	Built	Notes and Citations
Old Parsonage (a.k.a. Dr. Seth's House)	T-300	Talbot Street, 210 N. (SW corner with Dodson Ave)	38.7882713°N 76.2252544°W		1883	The only Queen Anne style brick house in St. Michaels. Built by Henry Clay Dodson. Donated in 1924 to the Union Methodist Church by Sarah Dodson Seth. The church sold the building in 1985.
Thomas Dyott House (a.k.a. Captain Dodson House)	T-268	Mill Street (St. Michaels Maritime Museum, faces harbor)	38.7872013°N 76.2205621°W		1855	Only three-story gallery in St. Michaels. Thomas Dyott built the house at Navy Point. Richard S. Dodson purchased the house in 1885, and it remained in the Dodson family until the early 1960s.
Union United Methodist Church	T-571	Railroad Avenue, 201 (corner with Fremont St)	38.7866117°N 76.2252831°W		1895	Goth Revival structure with three-story bell tower and a broach spire. Has a Victorian interior. Largest black church in town. Designed by master craftsman Horace Turner.
Gingerbread House	T-271	Talbot Street, 103 S. (near Cherry St.)	38.7864028°N 76.2242879°W		1879	Victorian exterior with "Tee- and ell-plan".
Town Hall Mall	T-555	Talbot Street, 202 S. (West side)	38.7854849°N 76.2242038°W		1875	The two-story gable-front frame building is one of the town's largest. Originally intended to contain a Masonic Lodge Room and a town Hall
Dorris House (a.k.a. Mount Pleasant)	T-258	Talbot Street, 305 S. (corner with Mulberry St.)	38.7840325°N 76.2237989°W		1806	Built by merchant James Dooris. Molded watertable and jack arches.
Christ Episcopal Church	T-260	Talbot Street, 213 S.	38.7845325°N 76.2241011°W		1878	One of architectural centerpieces of town. Full name of church is Christ Protestant Episcopal Church of St. Michael's Parish. The Parish was established in 1672. John Hollingsworth patented 50 acres (20 ha) around the shore of the river in 1664, and named it The Beach. Current church, built in 1878, is the fourth church building to occupy the site—part of land that was Hollingsworth's.
Captain's Cabin	T-576	Talbot Street, 214 S. (across from church)	38.7841195°N 76.2241444°W		1865	Large two-story commercial building with twisting chimney built by real estate agent James Benson.
St. Luke's Methodist Church (Sardis Chapel)	T-259	Talbot Street, 302–304 S.	38.7842077°N 76.2239011°W		1871	Italianate building.
Leonard Funeral Home (a.k.a. Thomas Bruff House)	T-243	Talbot Street, 312 S. (corner with Grace St.)	38.7837292°N 76.2236752°W		1837	Rare St. Michaels "telescope" house. Originally owned by ship's carpenter Thomas Bruff.
Old Inn	T-257	Talbot Street, 401 S. (corner with Mulberry St.)	38.7837292°N 76.2236752°W		1816	Listed in the National Register of Historic Places. Earliest two-story engaged gallery in town. Wrightson Jones, believed to be a shipwright, built the inn shortly after he purchased some lots in 1816. In 1853, his son (also named Wrightson Jones) acquired property from other heirs.
Clifton Hope House	T-560	Talbot Street, 400 S. (corner with Grace St.)	38.7835148°N 76.2235463°W		1888	Queen Anne style with rare eyebrow windows that light the attic. Clifton Hope built house in 1888, and it remained in the family until 1968.
Dr. Miller's Farmhouse (a.k.a. Spencer House or Berkeley's Hall)	T-255	Talbot Street, 417 S. (corner with Chestnut St.)	38.782679°N 76.2230412°W		1840	Spencer family built the house and sold it to Dr. John Miller in 1847. House remained in Miller family until 1936. House was one of few built during recession period of late 1830s through 1840s. Brick house with small brick dairy or smokehouse.
Colonel Kemp House	T-279	Talbot Street, 412 S. (NW corner with Chestnut St.)	38.7825882°N 76.2229898°W		1807	Federal period brick structure. Colonel Joseph Kemp had this house built, and lived in it until his death around 1828. After his death, the house was purchased by the wife of William Kemp, and the house remained in that family until the early 20th century. Some of the woodwork in the interior may have been conducted by St. Michaels craftsman John Bruff.
Arianna Sears House (a.k.a. Hotel Storey)	T-723	Cherry Street, 104	38.7866656°N 76.2235925°W		1866	House originally owned by Arianna Sears. In 1874, ownership transferred to her daughters, Mary True Storey and Anna Catherine Storey. Used as a hotel around 1900. Property sold out of the family in 1907.
Alexander H. Seth House	T-570	Cherry Street, 105 (corner with Cedar Street)	38.7866404°N 76.2237261°W		1859	House is covered by an atypical hip roof which survives with its seamed tin sheathing.
The Snuggery	T-266	Cherry Street, 203 (near Locust Street on north side)	38.7867436°N 76.2231102°W		1700	Log construction on front (now covered with siding) with Victorian interior including two marble mantle pieces.
Kepner House	T-561	Cherry Street, 204 (south side of street fronting harbor)	38.7867845°N 76.2228815°W		1850	Two-story on harbor.
Henry Clay Dodson House (a.k.a. Shannahan House)	T-270	Cherry Street (205, end of street)	38.7868237°N 76.2226671°W		1873	Built by Dodson. Bought by Norman M. Shannahan in 1911 and remained in family until 1987. Contrasts with other domestic architecture in town. Elaborate mansard roof and Colonial Revival porches.
Dr. Dodson House	T-265	Locust Street, 101 (corner with 200 Cherry St.)	38.7867036°N 76.2233108°W		1800	Originally a tavern built by Joseph or Samuel Harrison. Enlarged by Judge William H. Bruff. Also owned by Thomas Auld. Dr. Robert A. Dodson bought in 1878. Two-story brick built around 1800 with addition around later.
Haddaway House	T-569	Locust Street, 103 (east side near Carpenter Street)	38.7861595°N 76.2230333°W		1808	Shipbuilder Thomas L. Haddaway lived in this house before and during the War of 1812. A single-story double-pile house that dates to the early 19th century.
Marshall House	T-563	Locust Street (104, and Carpenter Street, NW corner)	38.7860968°N 76.2229553°W		1803	Originally owned by John Harrison. One of the better surviving interiors from the Federal period.
Wrightson Jones House	T-598	Locust Street, 201 (SE corner with Carpenter St.)	38.7860479°N 76.2229597°W		1850	Chamfered posts on porch, sawn brackets and balusters.
Wickersham	T-56	Locust Street, 203	38.7857416°N 76.2227752°W		1750	Originally built by Robert Harwood, Dawson Baker Farm moved from Easton to St. Michaels in 2004.
Franklin L. Tinker House (a.k.a. Thomas Harrison House)	T-591	Green Street, 201	38.7854227°N 76.2224973°W		1798	Oldest two-story frame structure still standing in town. Carpenter Thomas Harrison constructed house before 1798.
Bruff-Mansfield House	T-262	Green Street, 111 (NW corner with Locust Street)	38.7853589°N 76.222566°W		1808	Wheelwright John Bruff Sr. and later John F. Mansfield were among the early owners of this house. Bruff bought the lot from James Braddock in 1778. John Bruff Jr., a carpenter, inherited the house.
Tarr House	T-261	Green Street, 109	38.7851417°N 76.2228317°W		1805	One and a half-story with gabled dormers.
Cannonball House	T-61	Mulberry Street, 200 (near St. Mary's Square)	38.7842705°N 76.2225617°W		1808	Listed in the National Register of Historic Places. House hit by cannonball in British naval attack in 1813 during the War of 1812.
Amelia Welby House (a.k.a. Captain Wetheral House)	T-254	Mulberry Street, 209 (near Water Street)	38.7845645°N 76.2217381°W		1783	Wetheral operated shipyard and died in 1774. His property was bought by James Braddock in 1778. The house is possibly the oldest house remaining in St. Michaels. Amelia Coppuck Welby is thought to have been born in this house, which was rented by her parents in 1819.
Robert Lambdin House (a.k.a. The Cottage)	T-253	Water Street 401, (corner with Mulberry Street, front entrance is on Mulberry)	38.784649°N 76.2214707°W		1832	Modest early 19th century house. Shipbuilder Robert Lambdin lived here, which is close to the water.
St. Mary's Square Museum	T-252	St. Mary's Square and Chestnut Street	38.7830176°N 76.2214675°W		1850	Built from reused timers from a steam mill.
Granite Lodge	T-274	St. Mary's Square, 403	38.7834933°N 76.2221534°W		1839	Brick Greek Revival style originally a Methodist church.
J. Harrison Kemp House	T-273	Chestnut Street, 110 E.	38.7828498°N 76.2219151°W		1857	Largest and most architecturally distinctive dwelling along street consisting of late 19th-century homes. Also known as the John W. Blades house for the oysterman who built it around 1857.
John H. Blades House	T-630	Chestnut Street, 112 E.	38.7830176°N 76.2214675°W		1870	Part of a group of well-preserved late 19th century dwellings.
St. Michaels Mill	T-437	Chew Avenue, 100	38.7819101°N 76.2218608°W		1890	Listed in the National Register of Historic Places. Center of commerce for 50 years. Eventually owned by James E. Watkins and Robert S. Dodson. Sold to Samuel Quillen and sons in 1920. Built by Arthur K. Easter. Mill operated until 1972, and sold Just Right Flour.
Rogers House (a.k.a. Crepe Myrtle Cottage)	T-272	Chestnut Street, 112 W.	38.7818653°N 76.2246153°W		1835	Story-and-a-half frame house. John Dorgin, one of the original commissioners of the town, owned the property at one time.
James Caulk House	T-742	Chestnut Street, 119 W.	38.7817887°N 76.2248274°W		1850	Chamfered posts on porch, sawn brackets and balusters.
Bruff House	T-241	Thompson Street, 101 (north side)	38.7827103°N 76.2237132°W		1790	One of the oldest standing structures in town.

== People ==
- Auld–Hugh Auld Sr. fought with the Talbot County Militia during the Revolutionary War. His son, Hugh Auld Jr. was a lieutenant colonel with the 26th Maryland Militia during the War of 1812. His son, Thomas Auld (1795–1880) became a ship captain living in Talbot County, and had a brother named Hugh that was a shipbuilder living in Baltimore. Slave (and future prominent activist) Frederick Douglass spent time at both brothers' households, but was legally owned by Thomas.
- Banning–Captain Robert Banning commanded a St. Michaels company of cavalry during the War of 1812.
- Benson—Samuel Perry Benson (1757–1827), known as Perry Benson, was a captain in the Continental Army during the American Revolutionary War, and a Major General in the Maryland state militia during the War of 1812. He lived between St. Michaels and Easton near Oak Creek and the St. Michaels (now known as Miles) River.
- Chaney– The Chaney brothers were free African Americans who were builders and owners of a house in St. Michaels around 1851.
- Blades–Thomas W. Blades was postmaster of St. Michaels in 1856 and 1857. Levin Blades was foreman of William Harrison's shipyard around 1810. This shipyard built large sea-going vessels, and was one of the biggest in Talbot County.
- Braddock–James Braddock, was an agent for James Gildart and John Gawith and Company, of Liverpool. James Braddock purchased Philip Wetheral's property in 1778, and began developing the area.
- Bruff–Craftsman John Bruff Sr. (1740–1819) is listed as a wheelwright with a log shop in a 1783 tax assessment for St. Michaels. He was also a joiner. John Bruff Jr. (1774–1857), Thomas Bruff (1780–1857) was a ship's carpenter. William H. Bruff was a judge in 1872.
- Coulborne–African-American William Coulbourne was a partner in the Coulbourne and Jewett Seafood Packing Company in St. Michaels. The company was one of Maryland's most successful minority-owned businesses, and at one time during the 20th century was the largest employer in St. Michaels.
- Davis—John Davis ran a shipyard in St. Michaels around 1810.
- Dawson–Impey Dawson owned Dawson's wharf, a shipyard in St. Michaels during the War of 1812.
- Dodson—Robert Dodson (1762–1824) was a farmer and businessman that owned several vessels that had routes between Baltimore and St. Michaels. He was one of the first commissioners of St. Michaels, active in the War of 1812, and is buried in the Methodist Cemetery at St. Michaels. His eldest son is Captain William Dodson (1786–1833), who was in charge of his father's packet schooners. During the War of 1812, Captain Dodson, holding the rank of lieutenant, was the artillerist in command of a fortification (Parrott's Point Battery) at St. Michaels that was attacked by the British. During 1814 he fought the British while part of the United States Navy, and returned to St. Michaels after the war where he continued his old occupation. His son, Captain Robert Auld Dodson (1808–1883) was also a sailor. He returned to St. Michaels after his father's death and continued the packet boat business. He was present at the Baltimore riot of 1861, where he denounced the attack on Massachusetts troops and had his life threatened by the rioters. He was appointed postmaster of St. Michaels in 1878. His brother, Edward Napoleon Dodson (1829–1899), was a steamboat captain. Robert A. Dodson's son, Richard Stearns Dodson (1838–1897), was also a sailor and captained his father's schooner William K. Dodson. He gave up sailing for the hotel business in Baltimore, Pennsylvania, and then Norfolk. He also had property and businesses in St. Michaels, including the Saint Michaels and Miles River Steamboat Company. At one time, the Dodson family owned Navy Point along the harbor in St. Michaels. This section is now (2021) occupied by the Chesapeake Bay Maritime Museum and a waterside restaurant. Another son of Robert Auld Dodson was Henry Clay Dodson (1840–1914), who was a businessman and politician. He served as St. Michaels town commissioner and postmaster. He also served in the Maryland House of Delegates and Maryland Senate. The son of Richard Stearns Dodson, Richard Slicer Dodson, was a banker and served in the Maryland General Assembly.
- Dorris–James Dooris (Dorris) was a St. Michaels merchant from Ireland. He was a member of the Democratic-Republican Party, and served in the Maryland Legislature.
- Dorgan–Craftsman John Dorgan is listed as a blacksmith in a 1783 tax assessment for St. Michaels. He was one of the original commissioners of the town of St. Michaels. Dorgan was involved in building as a ship-smith instead of a shipwright, and used others to construct his boats.
- Douglass–Prominent activist Frederick Douglass (1818–1895) was a slave in St. Michaels from 1833 to 1836, returned to visit as a free man in 1877.
- Dyott–Thomas Dyott was a storekeeper that lived by the water at Navy Point in 1861.
- Easter–Arthur K. Easter built the St. Michaels Flour Mill around 1890.
- Elliot—Edward Elliot is thought to have been the donor of the land used for the original Episcopal Church in St. Michaels.
- Graham–Lieutenant John Graham (1778–1837) commanded at battery at Dawson's Wharf when the British attacked St. Michaels in 1813. The battery played an important role in preventing the British from entering the town.
- Haddaway–Thomas S. Haddaway was one of the original commissioners of the town of St. Michaels. Thomas L. Haddaway operated a shipyard near Locust Street in St. Michaels in the late 1700s.
- Hambleton—One of the earliest settlers in the St. Michaels area was William Hambleton, who emigrated from Scotland around 1659. Thomas Hambleton had a shipyard near St. Michaels around 1810, located near Hambleton's Island in Church Neck. Samuel N. Hambleton was awarded a medal for his service in the 1813 Battle of Lake Erie under the command of Master commandant Oliver Perry, and named his farm Perry Cabin in honor of his leader.
- Harris—Skinner Harris ran a shipyard in St. Michaels around 1810.
- Harrison—Thomas Harrison was a house carpenter who constructed his house on Green Street around 1798. His son, Samuel Harrison, moved a store to St. Michaels around 1810. He was also involved with making advances to ship builders of both money and supplies, owned a large mill. William Harrison of Mount Pleasant, Church Neck, built large sea-going vessels in his shipyard near St. Michaels.
- Hope—Clifton Hope was president of the St. Michaels Bank during the early 20th century. He died in 1935.
- Jewett—Frederick S. Jewett ran the Coulbourne and Jewett Seafood Packing Company, which was a successful African American business in the early 20th century. He established the packinghouse in 1902, and devised a crabmeat grading system still used today (2021). Although the firm originally packed oysters, it eventually specialized in crabmeat. Frederick Jewett's son, Elwood S. Jewett (1904–1977), took over the business in the 1940s. The company was sold during the 1960s when overharvesting caused may Chesapeake seafood packers to close.
- Jones—Wrightson Jones was a shipbuilder at the time of the War of 1812, and had a shipyard on the southwest side of St. Michaels at Beverly on San Domingo Creek. When the British attacked St. Michaels in 1813, he manned an artillery piece that was part of a two-gun battery at a wharf in town. This battery, in combination with another, held off the British attackers. Jones died in 1834.
- Kemp–Thomas Kemp (1779–1824) was a master shipbuilder who made most of his famous ships in Baltimore. It is thought that he learned his shipbuilding skills from Impey Dawson at his shipyard in St. Michaels. In 1816, he moved back to the St. Michaels area at Wades Point (Bay Hundred) in Talbot County. His sons were named Thomas H. Kemp and John W. Kemp. His brother, Joseph, was also a shipbuilder. Joseph Kemp had a shipyard in St. Michaels. Captain Joseph Kemp, later Colonel Kemp, commanded a company of infantry from St. Michaels during the War of 1812. His company was named the Saint Michaels Patriotic Blues. Joseph Kemp died in 1828.
- Kirby—Shipbuilder Thomas H. Kirby (1824–1915) apprenticed at Robert Lambdin's shipyard in St. Michaels. After working with George W. Lambdin in Baltimore during the Civil War, he returned to St. Michaels and began his own yard. In 1870 he moved his yard across the harbor to the former yard of Edward Willey, and purchased the site five years later after forming a partnership with vessel owner Frederick Lang. For 15 years, the yard was called Kirby & Lang. In 1890, Kirby bought out Lang and formed a partnership with two of his sons. The firm was called Thomas H. Kirby and Sons, and it was the last St. Michaels yard to build large wooden ships. The firm transitioned to maintenance and repair work, and produced smaller boats such as those used for gathering oysters.
- Lambdin—Robert Lambdin (1799–1885) was a fourth-generation St. Michaels shipbuilder. Although his father died young, he apprenticed for his step-father shipbuilder John Graham. After working about 20 years in Baltimore, he returned to St. Michaels and operated a small yard near Mulberry Street for 45 years. He taught all five of his sons the shipbuilding trade. His eldest son, George Washington Lambdin (1832–1890) worked in Baltimore during the Civil War. He, along with brother William Adolphus Lambdin (1836–1903) became partners with their father in 1865. Another son, Robert Dawson Lambdin (1849–1938) began his apprenticeship in 1865. He left to work in the Washington Navy Yard in 1869, and eventually returned to St. Michaels to build log canoes. The Lambdin yard closed in 1886.
- Merchant—William Merchant owned the "Cannonball House" that was hit by a cannonball shot by the British during 1813. He was a ship–smith.
- Miller—Physician John Miller developed E. Chew Avenue and Marengo Street before that area became part of the town of St. Michaels.
- Sears—Arianna Amanda Auld Sears (1826–1878) was a friend of Frederick Douglass. She knew Douglass while he was a slave belonging to her father, Thomas Auld. She married a coal merchant named John L. Sears in 1843. Arianna became an opponent of slavery, and became friends with Douglass after an 1857 reunion. William Sears
- Seth—Alexander H. Seth was a Justice of the Peace for the state of Maryland representing Talbot County in 1874.
- Sewell—Jeremiah Sewell was a waterman in St. Michaels around 1865.
- Spencer—James S. Spencer (1667–1714) had a farm close to St. Michaels around 1670. Colonel Perry Spencer (1750–1822) had a shipyard in St. Michaels around 1810 that was one of the largest in town, and he also had a second yard on Broad Creek. His brother Richard Spencer was also a shipbuilder.
- Thompson—John Thompson took control of James Braddock's land in 1783 after Mr. Braddock's death, and continued dividing the area that became St. Michaels into lots for sale.
- Turner—Horace Turner was the black builder involved with building the Union United Methodist Church, and built his own house on Dodson Avenue around 1904.
- Welby—Poet laureate of Maryland Amelia B. Coppuck Welby (1819–1852), was born in a house in St. Michaels. After she moved away, she became a poet who was praised by Edgar Allan Poe.
- Wetheral—Captain Philip Wetheral operated a blacksmith shop and shipyard in St. Michaels. He died in 1774, and his property was later purchased by James Braddock who began developing what became the town of Saint Michaels.
- Willey—Edward Willey (1814–1891) was a St. Michaels shipbuilder in the middle of the 19th century, and is credited with the 1840 revival of the industry in town.
- Wrightson—John Wrightson had a shipyard in St. Michaels during the War of 1812.

== See also ==
Town#Maryland

== Notes ==
=== References ===
- Atkins, Leslie (2014). Backroads & Byways of Chesapeake Bay: Drives, Daytrips and Weekend Excursions. Woodstock, Vermont: The Countryman Press. ISBN 978-1-58157-706-8. OCLC 918305276.
- Bourne, M. Florence (1954). "Thomas Kemp, Shipbuilder, and His Home, Wades Point". In Maryland Historical Society (ed.). Maryland Historical Magazine Vol. XLIX, No. 4 (December 1954) (PDF). Baltimore, Maryland: Maryland Historical Society. pp. 271–289.
- Earle, Swepson; Skirven, Percy G., eds. (1916). Maryland's Colonial Eastern Shore; Historical Sketches of Counties and of Some Notable Structures. Baltimore, Maryland: Munder-Thomsen Press. OCLC 2004881.
- Finkelman, Paul, ed. (2006). Encyclopedia of African American history, 1619-1895: From the Colonial Period to the Age of Frederick Douglass. Vol. 1, A-E. New York City: Oxford University Press. ISBN 978-0-19516-777-1. OCLC 1043702199.
- Hall, Clayton Colman, ed. (1912). Baltimore Its History and its People – Volume III—Biography. New York City: Lewis Historical Publishing Company. OCLC 1178422.
- Historic District Commission (St. Michaels), ed. (2021). Historic District Design Review Guidelines Town of St. Michaels (PDF). Saint Michaels, Maryland: Corporation of St. Michaels Talbot Co. MD.
- Ingraham, Prentiss (1898). Land of Legendary Lore Sketches of Romance and Reality on the Eastern Shore of the Chesapeake. Easton, Maryland: The Gazette Publishing House. OCLC 1031797805.
- Leach, M. Atherton (1905). "Register of St. Michael's Parish, Talbot County, Maryland, 1672-1704". In Historical Society of Pennsylvania (ed.). The Pennsylvania Magazine of History and Biography Vol. XXIX. Philadelphia, Pennsylvania: Historical Society of Pennsylvania. pp. 427–438. OCLC 1762062.
- Marine, William Matthew (1913). Dielman, Louis Henry (ed.). The British Invasion of Maryland, 1812–1815. Baltimore, Maryland: Society of the War of 1812 in Maryland. ISBN 978-0-80630-760-2. OCLC 3120839.
- Maryland (1874). Laws of the State of Maryland. Annapolis, Maryland: S.F. Mills and L.F. Colton. OCLC 42336599.
- Maryland Bank Commissioner (1918). Eighth Annual Report of the Bank Commissioner of the State of Maryland. Baltimore, Maryland: Baltimore City Printing and Binding Company. OCLC 2377528.
- Mashaw, Jerry L.; MacClintock, Anne U. (2003). Seasoned by Salt: A Voyage in Search of the Caribbean. Dobbs Ferry, New York: Sheridan House. OCLC 1225861717.
- Rutherford, Mildred Lewis (1907). The South in History and Literature; a Hand-book of Southern Authors, from the Settlement of Jamestown, 1607, to Living Writers. Atlanta, Georgia: Franklin-Turner Company. OCLC 7982315.
- Scharf, J. Thomas (1879). History of Maryland from the Earliest Period to the Present Day - Volume II. Baltimore, Maryland: John B. Piet. OCLC 4663774.
- Tilghman, Oswald; Harrison, Samuel A. (1915). History of Talbot county, Maryland, 1661–1861, Volume II. Baltimore, Maryland: Williams and Wilkins Company. OCLC 1541072.
- United States Department of the Interior, Fish and Wildlife Service (1955). Around St. Michaels. Washington, District of Columbia: Bureau of Commercial Fisheries. OCLC 1690727.
- Vitabile, Christina (2007). Around St. Michaels. Charleston, South Carolina: Arcadia Publishing. ISBN 978-0-73854-258-4. OCLC 173176475.
