= Victorian Corn Cribs =

- U.S. National Register of Historic Places
- Location within Maryland Location within the United States
- Location: Doncaster Road, St. Michaels, Maryland
- Coordinates: 38°47′10″N 76°8′11″W
- Area: 0.5 acres (0.20 ha)
- Built: 1850
- Architectural style: Gothic Revival
- NRHP reference No.: 76002289
- Added to NRHP: January 11, 1976

Victorian Corn Cribs are historic agricultural buildings at St. Michael's, Talbot County, Maryland. The two structures feature elaborate tracery along the eaves and bargeboards, and are connected by a low, rough shed. They were moved from their original site on the north side of U.S. Route 13, about two miles east of Westover, in Somerset County, to their present Talbot County site in June 1975.

It was listed on the National Register of Historic Places in 1976.
