= St. Michaels Half Marathon =

Annual road race

- Date: May
- Location: St. Michaels, Maryland
- Event type: Road race
- Distance: Half marathon
- Primary sponsor: Nationwide
- Established: May 19, 2012
- Course records: 1:08:13 (male); 1:26:11 (female); 1:21:38 (Under-19 male); 1:28:58 (Under-19 female)
- Website: Official website

The St. Michaels Half Marathon is an annual half marathon road race. The race is competed at the amateur level. Although the event does not have a title sponsor, Nationwide is considered the primary sponsor. The race is organized by the St. Michaels Running Festival, which also hosts 10 km and 5 km runs. The Festival attracted over 1,500 runners in its opening year, and approximately 3,000 in its second edition.

== Course ==
St. Michaels Half Marathon is a USATF certified course, measuring exactly 13.1 miles. The course is relatively flat, with grades varying between +4% and -4%, while the average elevation is 10 feet above sea level. The maximum recorded elevation is 18 feet on Martingham Dr., however, the lowest is reportedly at sea level. The marathon takes place primarily in downtown St. Michaels, Maryland, although, the race for a time ventures out of the city. The 2013 event started on Seymour Ave., and finished on Maryland 33 or North Talbot St.

== List of winners ==
Key: Course record Participants record

Date	Men	Time	Men Under-19	Time	Women	Time	Women Under-19	Time	Finishers
May 19, 2012	(Georgia (U.S. state)) Peyton Hoyal	1:12:53	(Pennsylvania) Nathaniel Miranda	1:35:40	(North Carolina) Taylor Gupton	1:34:49	(Maryland) Jennifer Lingg	1:40:23	419
May 18, 2013	(Maryland) Thomas Worob	1:08:58	(Virginia) Colin Chartier (Note: Since they podiumed, Steve Sloan of Maryland and Kepano Ream of Virginia were disqualified from the Under-19 classification. Thus, Colin Chartier – who finished third in the ranking – won the title.)	1:26:16	(Virginia) Sarah Grigsby	1:28:26	(Virginia) Katy Wilson	1:49:13	1,182
May 17, 2014	(Maryland) David Raley	1:21:17	(Maryland) Ben Cambon	1:26:55	(Washington, D.C.) Bridget Holt	1:27:44	(Maryland) Kathryn Gearhart	1:28:58	1,260
May 16, 2015	(North Carolina) Peyton Hoyal	1:08:13	(Virginia) Hussein Abduelwahab	1:44:07	(Virginia) Jillian Pollack	1:27:30	(Virginia) Ellie Sears	1:59:53	1,496
May 21, 2016	(North Carolina) Peyton Hoyal	1:10:37	(Maryland) Andrew Stag	1:21:38	(Maryland) Angela Hartman	1:26:11	(Pennsylvania) Samantha Kaeser	1:55:14	1,553
