= Saint Michaels, Maryland =

- Town
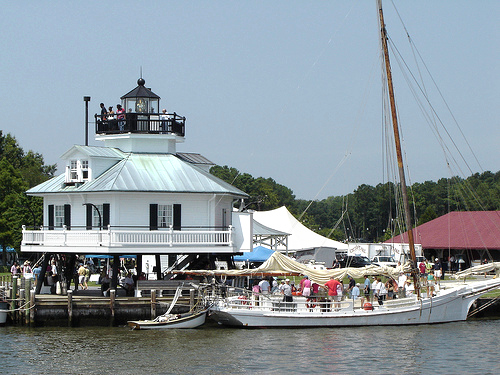
- Hooper Strait Lighthouse at the Chesapeake Bay Maritime Museum

- Flag Seal
- Motto: "Historic Charm, Nautical Adventure, Romantic Spaces"
- Location of Saint Michaels, Maryland

- Location within the U.S. state of Maryland Saint Michaels (the United States)
- Coordinates: 38°47′1″N 76°13′20″W
- Country: United States
- State: Maryland
- County: Talbot
- Incorporated: 1804

Area
  - Total: 1.27 sq mi (3.28 km^{2})
  - Land: 1.17 sq mi (3.02 km^{2})
  - Water: 0.10 sq mi (0.26 km^{2})
- Elevation: 9.8 ft (3 m)

Population (2020)
  - Total: 1,049
  - Density: 899.9/sq mi (347.44/km^{2})
- Time zone: UTC-5 (Eastern (EST))
  - Summer (DST): UTC-4 (EDT)
- ZIP code: 21663
- Area codes: 410, 443, and 667
- FIPS code: 24-69825
- GNIS feature ID: 0591218
- Website: https://www.stmichaelsmd.gov/

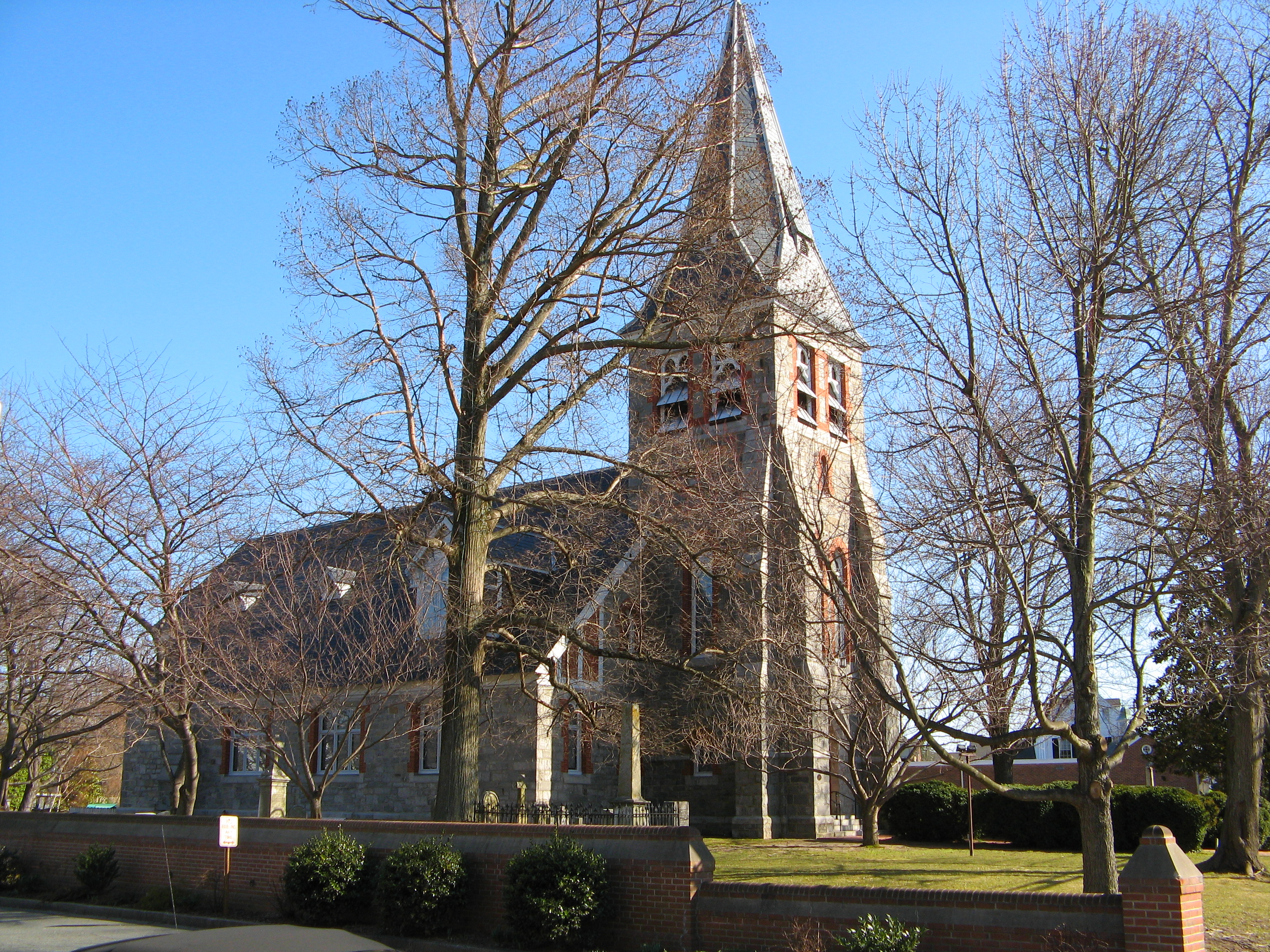
Christ Church Episcopal Church in Saint Michaels main road

Saint Michaels, also known as St. Michaels, is a town in Talbot County, Maryland, United States. Saint Michaels derives its name from the Episcopal parish — itself named after Michael the Archangel — established there in 1677. The church attracted settlers who engaged in tobacco growing and ship-building, and thence further development. The population was 1,094 as of the 2020 Census.

== History ==
The town was laid out as a speculative development in the 1770s by James Braddock. Unlike the more typical 18th century grid-pattern town planning, Braddock laid St. Michaels out around a central square. The town was incorporated in 1804.

A rural Anglican church that long predated the town gave St. Michaels its name. Despite this church's presence on the shore of the harbor, the town of St. Michaels early became predominantly Methodist following visits by itinerant Methodist preachers. Braddock donated land for a Methodist church in the center of St. Mary's square. A brick structure was built and after the war of 1812 the name of Sardis Chapel was adopted. That building was razed and a new brick building was erected in 1839. The cornerstone was laid on July 4, 1839. It remains on that site.

=== 19th century ===
The town's earliest industry was shipbuilding, and as many as six shipbuilders were active in or near the town by the War of 1812. Their typical product was a fast schooner, a type later known as the Baltimore Clipper. Such vessels were well adapted to evading blockades or outrunning pirates or foreign naval vessels at sea, and some were later used as privateers, private armed vessels carrying a letter of marque allowing them to take prizes at sea. An example is the Thomas L. Haddaway, which launched the schooner Lottery at St. Michaels in 1812 and obtained a letter of marque.

The town played a role in the War of 1812 when, in 1813, a fleet under the command of Admiral George Cockburn moved up the Chesapeake Bay, and targeted St. Michaels because of the presence of a militia battery erected to defend the town and its shipyards. Under cover of early morning darkness on August 10, 1813, the Battle of St. Michaels commenced as the British sent a landing party ashore just south of the town, and after a brief exchange, neutralized the battery and returned to their boats. The British proceeded to bombard the town from the barges and a brig, but failed to destroy the shipyards or cause any substantial damage to the town. The militia returned fire from artillery batteries at Impy Dawson's wharf (the foot of Mulberry Street) and Mill Point (the foot of Carpenter Street). A contemporary report noted that "several houses were pierced" by the British fire. Nearly a century later, a story was recorded that as a result of the town's ruse of dimming the lights and hanging lanterns in the trees beyond the town so that the cannonballs would overshoot the town, the town was spared. Based on this story, St. Michaels became known as "the town that fooled the British," a nickname selected during the sesquicentennial celebration of the battle in 1963. The Cannonball House survives as one of the structures reportedly struck by one of the shots, and is on the National Register of Historic Places, as is the Saint Michaels Historic District.

Shipbuilding declined after the War of 1812, but an oyster industry revived the town a few decades later. By the late nineteenth century, most households in the town had at least one person engaged in some aspect of this fishery, either tonging oysters from the nearby waters of Miles River and Eastern Bay, or engaged in the shucking houses that came to line the waterfront. One of these businesses, Coulbourne and Jewett, founded in the early years of the twentieth century, is notable as a black-owned enterprise, and it early on came to specialize in crabmeat. As a means of marketing crabmeat, owner Frederick Jewett devised a five level grading system (regular, claw, special, backfin, and lump) which is still used by the industry today.

St Michaels is where Frederick Douglass was sold in 1832 to Thomas Auld, and it was in the St Michaels jail that Douglass was confined in 1835 after an attempted escape to freedom.

In the 1860s, Robert E. Lee stayed at Kemp House on the corner of Chestnut Street and Talbot Street, where he was hosted by Confederate sympathizer Oliver Sparks.

=== 20th century ===
In 1902, Coulbourne and Jewett Seafood Packing Company was founded. The company was one of the first to exploit the region's abundant blue crab population. When in operation, it was one of Maryland's most successful minority-owned businesses and St. Michaels' largest employer. It closed in 1962.

In addition to the Cannonball House and St. Michaels Historic District, other National Register of Historic Places listings include Crooked Intention, Edmee S., Edna E. Lockwood, Island Bird (log canoe), Island Blossom (log canoe), Island Lark (log canoe), Jay Dee (log canoe), Magic (log canoe), Noddy (log canoe), The Old Inn, Persistence (log canoe), Rover (log canoe), Saint Michaels Mill, Sherwood Manor, Stanley Norman (skipjack), and Victorian Corn Cribs.

== Geography ==
Saint Michaels is located at 38°47′1″N 76°13′20″W (38.783748, -76.222214).

According to the United States Census Bureau, the town has a total area of 1.25 square miles (3.24 km^{2}), of which 1.15 square miles (2.98 km^{2}) is land and 0.10 square miles (0.26 km^{2}) is water.

St. Michaels is located in a long, narrow neck of land along the Miles River. The village is a tourist attraction, and there are high quality hotels, inns, seafood restaurants, and gift shops in town. Tour boat cruises connect the town with Annapolis across the Chesapeake Bay. A for-pay public ferryboat service in nearby Bellevue also takes people across the Tred Avon river to Oxford.

== Demographics ==
Historical population
Census	Pop.	Note	%±
1850	863		—
1860	1,016		17.7%
1870	1,095		7.8%
1880	1,175		7.3%
1890	1,329		13.1%
1900	1,043		−21.5%
1910	1,517		45.4%
1920	1,347		−11.2%
1930	1,308		−2.9%
1940	1,309		0.1%
1950	1,470		12.3%
1960	1,484		1.0%
1970	1,456		−1.9%
1980	1,301		−10.6%
1990	1,301		0.0%
2000	1,193		−8.3%
2010	1,029		−13.7%
2020	1,049		1.9%
U.S. Decennial Census

=== 2010 census ===
As of the census of 2010, there were 1,029 people, 509 households, and 281 families residing in the town. The population density was 894.8 inhabitants per square mile (345.5/km^{2}). There were 711 housing units at an average density of 618.3 per square mile (238.7/km^{2}). The racial makeup of the town was 69.0% White, 27.4% African American, 0.3% Native American, 0.5% Asian, 1.4% from other races, and 1.5% from two or more races. Hispanic or Latino of any race were 2.9% of the population.

There were 509 households, of which 21.0% had children under the age of 18 living with them, 38.9% were married couples living together, 12.6% had a female householder with no husband present, 3.7% had a male householder with no wife present, and 44.8% were non-families. 39.3% of all households were made up of individuals, and 19.2% had someone living alone who was 65 years of age or older. The average household size was 2.02 and the average family size was 2.67.

The median age in the town was 50.2 years. 18.3% of residents were under the age of 18; 6.3% were between the ages of 18 and 24; 17.6% were from 25 to 44; 29.4% were from 45 to 64; and 28.6% were 65 years of age or older. The gender makeup of the town was 41.5% male and 58.5% female.

=== 2000 census ===
As of the census of 2000, there were 1,193 people, 548 households, and 340 families residing in the town. The population density was 1,442.1 inhabitants per square mile (556.8/km^{2}). There were 671 housing units at an average density of 811.1 per square mile (313.2/km^{2}). The racial makeup of the town was 69.24% White, 29.25% African American, 0.17% Asian, 0.59% from other races, and 0.75% from two or more races. Hispanic or Latino of any race were 0.59% of the population.

There were 548 households, out of which 25.0% had children under the age of 18 living with them, 39.6% were married couples living together, 17.7% had a female householder with no husband present, and 37.8% were non-families. 34.1% of all households were made up of individuals, and 19.2% had someone living alone who was 65 years of age or older. The average household size was 2.18 and the average family size was 2.75.

In the town, the population was spread out, with 24.2% under the age of 18, 4.5% from 18 to 24, 21.3% from 25 to 44, 26.1% from 45 to 64, and 23.9% who were 65 years of age or older. The median age was 45 years. For every 100 females, there were 84.7 males. For every 100 females age 18 and over, there were 80.4 males.

The median income for a household in the town was $32,578, and the median income for a family was $39,821. Males had a median income of $30,438 versus $23,250 for females. The per capita income for the town was $28,131. About 11.1% of families and 15.0% of the population were below the poverty line, including 22.8% of those under age 18 and 9.8% of those age 65 or over.

== Economy ==
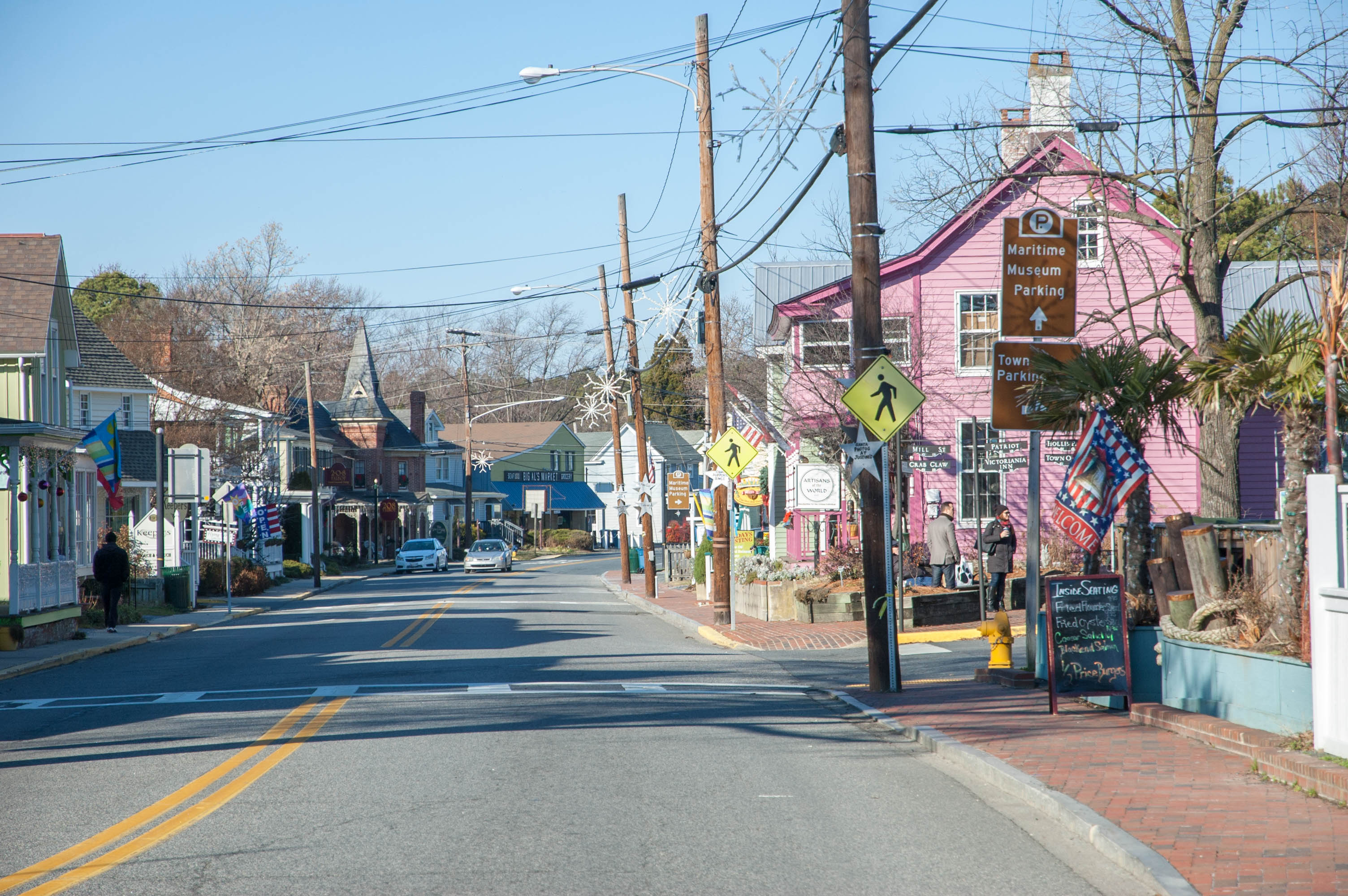
Downtown Saint Michaels on North Talbot Street

Although the town's tourist industry has roots in the mid nineteenth century with steamboats bringing excursionists from Baltimore to the town, and with summer guest cottages opening for weeklong rentals beginning in the 1880s, tourism was not a major part of the town's economy until the 1970s. The impetus started with a maritime museum, which opened its doors in 1965, and a waterfront seafood restaurant and a tour boat (the Patriot) followed before the end of the decade.

== Transportation ==
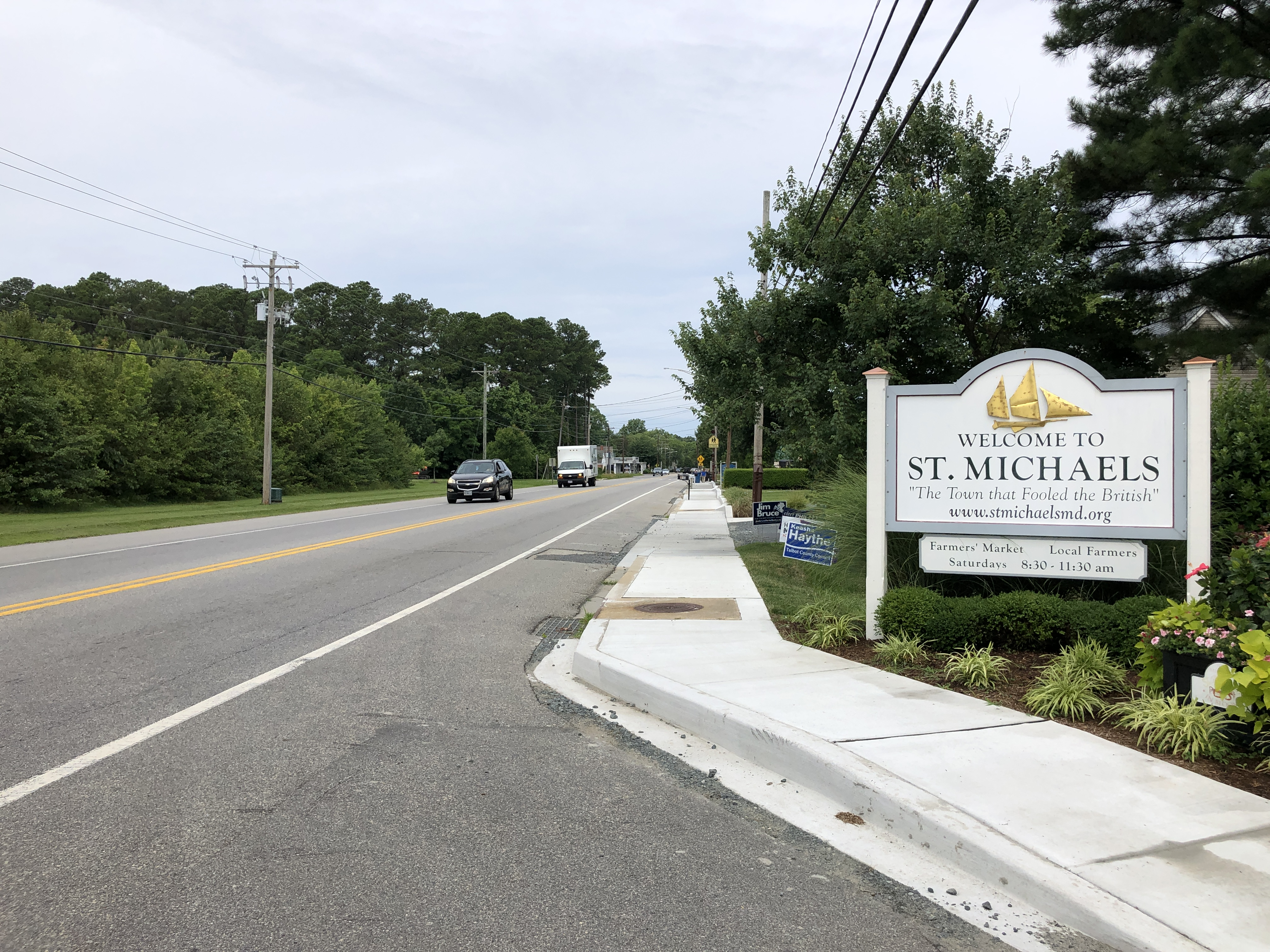
MD 33 westbound entering St. Michaels

The main means of transportation to and from Saint Michaels is by road. Maryland Route 33 is the only state highway serving the town, connecting it to Tilghman Island and Easton.

== Culture and tourism ==
In 2007 the town was named #8 of the Top Ten Romantic Escapes in the USA by Coastal Living Magazine. In 2018 Forbes published an article declaring St. Michaels as "The East Coast Weekend Getaway You've Been Missing".

From April to November, the town hosts a Saturday farmer's market featuring local produce from around the region.

Each May, the St. Michaels Running Festival and St. Michaels Half Marathon attracts amateur runners from around the region.

St. Michaels also hosts an annual fourth of July celebration and fireworks in St. Michaels Harbor. Each fall, the town hosts the "Fall into St. Michaels Weekend" featuring an annual Jack Russell dog race.

=== Museums and other points of interest ===
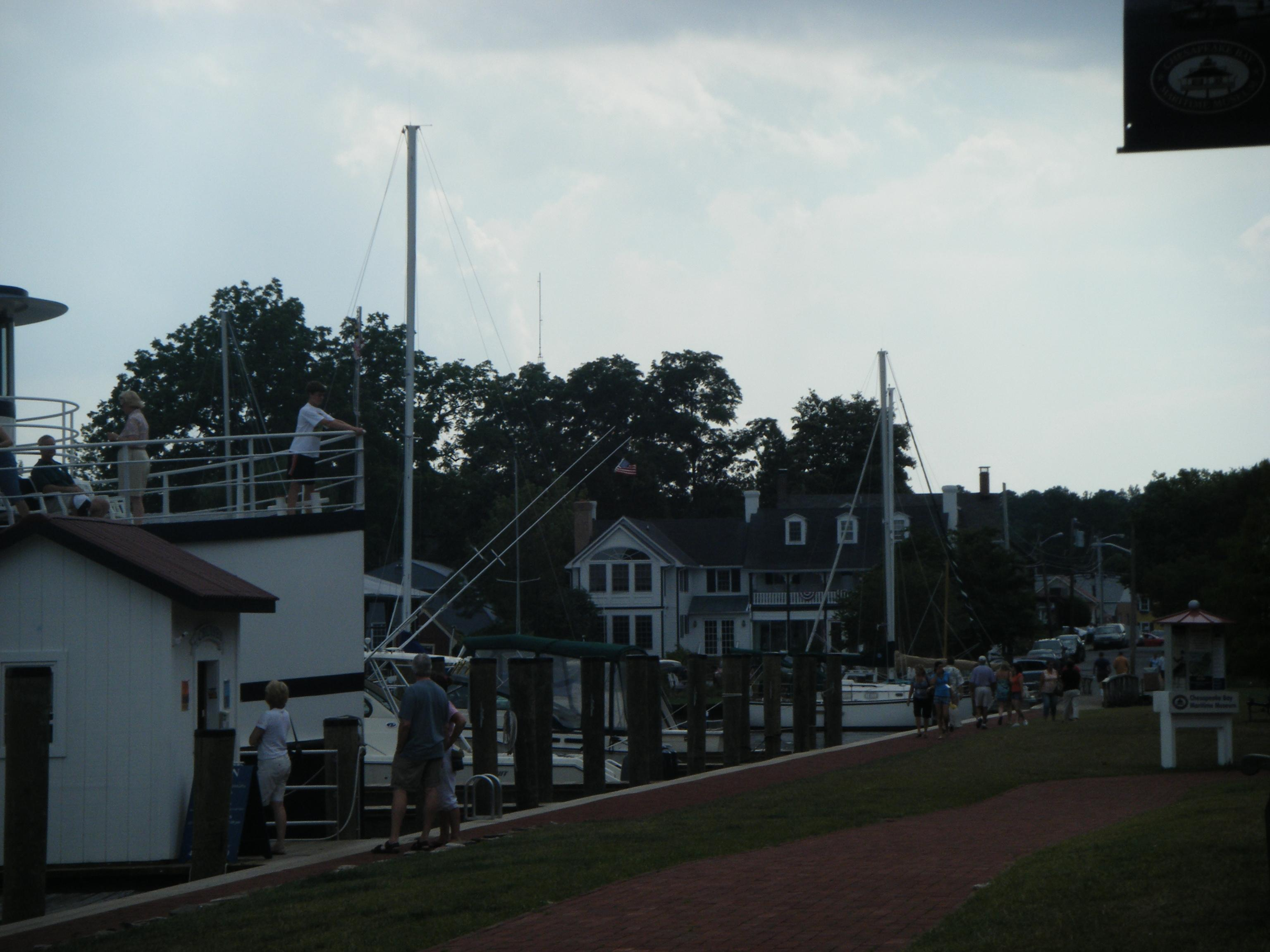
Saint Michaels harbor, looking toward Cherry Street

One of the town's chief attractions is the Chesapeake Bay Maritime Museum, located on land that was formerly occupied by seafood packing houses and a cannery. Saint Michaels is home to a number of historic bay vessels, including the bugeye Edna E. Lockwood, a National Historic Landmark, and several skipjacks.

The Saint Michaels Mill is a 19th century gristmill and was added to the U.S. National Register of Historical Places in 1982.

== Education ==
The Talbot County Public Schools includes the St. Michaels Middle/High School.

== Notable people ==
- Frederick Douglass was owned as a slave in and around St. Michaels on several occasions during his childhood and teenage years in the early 19th century. He lived within the St. Michaels village limits on several occasions as well as Wye House, a prominent plantation situated across the Miles River from St. Michaels. Researchers have also identified two plantations (though cannot definitively say which one) where Douglass likely worked for Edward Covey, a notorious "slave breaker," in what is now McDaniels, an unincorporated community near St. Michaels. In 1877, Frederick Douglass, then the U.S. Marshall for the District of Columbia, returned to St. Michaels, mainly to meet with his former owner, Thomas Auld, who was on his deathbed. According to Douglass, the meeting, which took place at what is now known as the Dr. Dodson/Bruff house, resulted in a reconciliation between the two men.
- Former baseball player, and member of baseball's Hall of Fame, Harold Baines grew up and still lives in Saint Michaels.
- Former Vice President Dick Cheney and former Secretary of Defense Donald Rumsfeld formerly owned water-front estates outside of St. Michaels.
- Former Secretary of Treasury Nicholas F. Brady owned water-front property outside of St. Michaels.
- Former Senator John Breaux lived in St. Michaels.
- Former Major League Baseball franchise owner and innovator Bill Veeck retired to Saint Michaels after selling the Chicago White Sox in 1981.
- Norman Johnson Stewart, Sr., artist, was a resident of St. Michael's. His home was on Talbot Street. He taught model ship building classes at the St. Michael's Maritime Museum. Some of his models are currently on display at the Smithsonian Museum.
- Author James A. Michener wrote much of his epic novel "Chesapeake" while living at a water-front estate, "Southwind," outside St. Michaels.
- Amelia B. Coppuck Welby (1819–1852), poet
- Washington Nationals Pitcher Tanner Roark lives in Saint Michaels.
- Anne Smith (née Love), social worker and mother of actress Julianne Moore.
- Arthur Cotton Moore, architect.
- Edward M. Gabriel, diplomat
- Amy L. Bondurant, diplomat
- Tony Snow, press secretary
- Joe Trippi, political strategist
- Johnny Mautz, state senator

== Cultural references ==
- The movie Clara's Heart starring Whoopi Goldberg and Neil Patrick Harris was filmed in Saint Michaels in 1988.
- The movie Wedding Crashers starring Owen Wilson and Vince Vaughn was partly filmed in Saint Michaels (mainly neighboring Easton) in 2004.
- The 1999 novel The Testament, written by John Grisham, features St. Michaels in the latter half of the book.
- The television show Bob's Burgers In season 6 episode 2, The Land Ship, references a scenario in which, during the War of 1812, the townspeople where the Belcher Family lives pulled a boat onto shore and rocked it back and forth in order to trick the British into running their ships aground thinking the shoreline was further inland. This is referred to in the show as 'The Sloop that Duped the British'. This was confirmed as a reference to St. Michaels by co-writer and Voice of Bob Belcher, H. Jon Benjamin.
