= Crooked Intention =

Historic house in Maryland, US

- U.S. National Register of Historic Places
- Location within Maryland Location within the United States
- Location: W of MD 33, St. Michaels, Maryland
- Coordinates: 38°46′44″N 76°13′53″W
- Area: 4 acres (1.6 ha)
- Built: 1753
- NRHP reference No.: 74000969
- Added to NRHP: July 24, 1974

Crooked Intention is a historic home in St. Michaels, Talbot County, Maryland, United States. It is a 1 1/2-story brick dwelling, three bays wide with wings, built about 1753. A 1 1/2-story Flemish bond wing was added in 1956. Also on the property is the original brick smokehouse and a beaded clapboard dairy.

Crooked Intention was listed on the National Register of Historic Places in 1974.
