= Saint Michaels Mill =

Historic gristmill in Maryland, US

- U.S. National Register of Historic Places
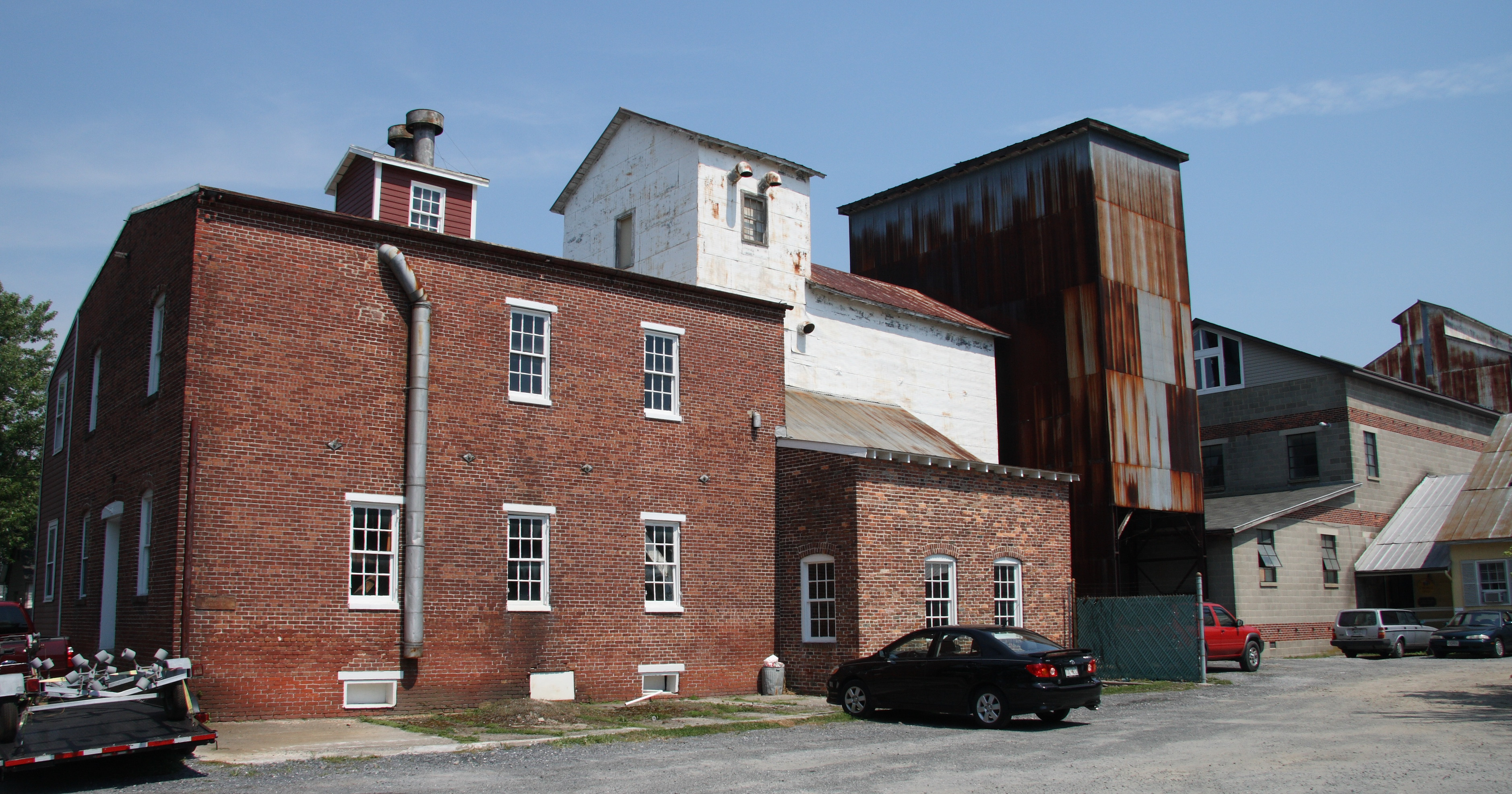

- Location within Maryland Location within the United States
- Location: St. Michaels, Maryland
- Coordinates: 38°46′56″N 76°13′13″W
- Built: 1890
- Architect: Arthur K. Easter
- NRHP reference No.: 82002820
- Added to NRHP: July 15, 1982

Saint Michaels Mill (also known as Quillens Mill) is a gristmill in Saint Michaels, Talbot County, Maryland first built in 1890 and expanded several times until the 1930s. Its chief product was "Just Right Flour".

It is located at 100 Chew Avenue. The building architect is Arthur K. Easter.

The mill is a good example of 19th century industrial architecture on Maryland's Eastern Shore. The milling equipment is original to the structure, mostly intact and still operative.

It was added to the U.S. National Register of Historical Places in 1982.
