= The Old Inn =

Historic inn in Maryland, US

- U.S. National Register of Historic Places
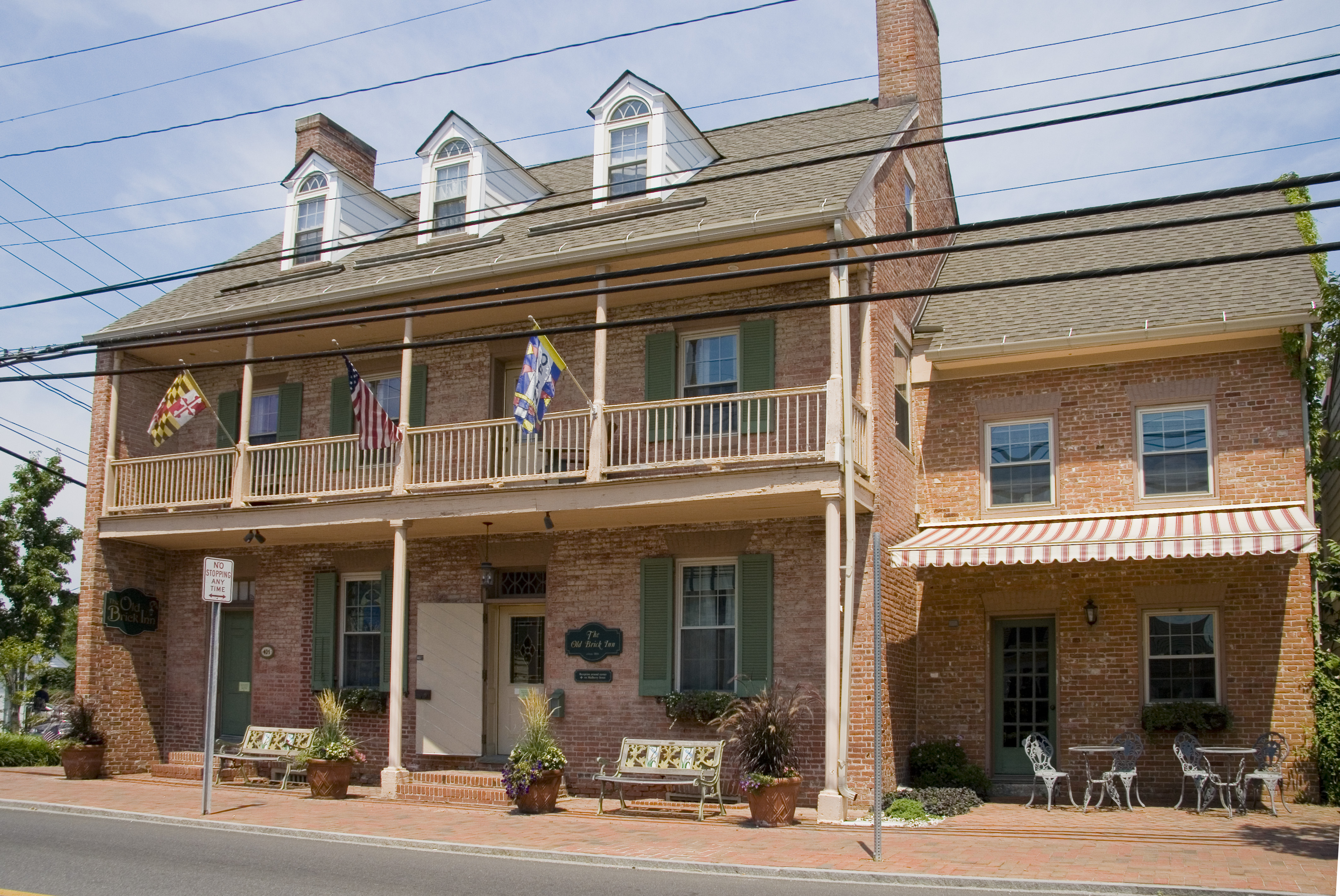

- Location within Maryland Location within the United States
- Location: 401 Talbot Street (MD 33), St. Michaels, Maryland
- Coordinates: 38°47′1″N 76°13′25″W
- Area: 1.8 acres (0.73 ha)
- Built: 1816
- NRHP reference No.: 80001840
- Added to NRHP: March 25, 1980

The Old Inn, also known as the Old Brick Inn, was built c. 1816 in Saint Michaels, Maryland. It is unusual for Maryland in possessing two-story porches on both its front and back sides.

The Old Inn was listed on the National Register of Historic Places in 1980.
