= Amelia B. Coppuck Welby =

American writer

Amelia Ball Coppuck Welby
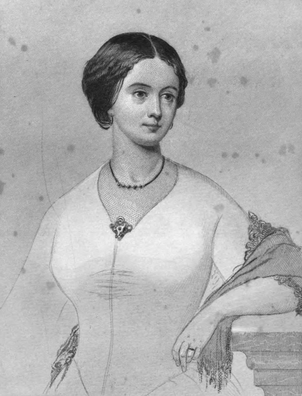
- Photo in A Woman of the Century
- Born: Amelia Ball Coppuck; February 3, 1819; Saint Michaels, Maryland, U.S.
- Died: May 3, 1852 (aged 33); Louisville, Kentucky, U.S.
- Occupation: poet
- Spouse: George B. Welby (m. 1838)
- Writing career
- Pen name: "Amelia"
- Notable work: "The Rainbow"

Amelia B. Coppuck Welby (née, Coppuck; pen name, Amelia; nickname, "Minstrel-girl"; February 3, 1819 - May 3, 1852) was a 19th-century American fugitive poet. In 1837, under the pen-name "Amelia," she contributed a number of poems to the Louisville "Journal," acquiring a reputation as a notable poet. She published in 1844 a small volume of poems, which quickly passed through several editions. It was republished in 1850, in New York City, in enlarged form, with illustrations by Robert Walter Weir. Though many of her poems were on the subject of death, including "The Bereaved", "The Dying Girl", "The Dying Mother", "The First Death of the Household", "The Mournful Heart", and "Sudden Death", she was one of the most popular poets in the South before the Civil War.

== Early life and education ==
Amelia Ball Coppuck was born in Saint Michaels, Maryland, February 3, 1819. (Note: Moulton (1892), records her date of birth as 1821.) When she was still quite young, her parents moved to Baltimore. She lived her girlhood in or near this city up to age 15. In 1834 or 1835, the family moved to Kentucky and took up residence, first in Lexington and later in Louisville where she spent her brief, quiet life. She received a careful education.

== Career ==
The Minstrel-girl—a nickname she gave herself— began at the age of eighteen to write poetry for the Louisville Journal, then edited by the poet, George D. Prentice, over the signature of "Amelia," and kept up her contributions regularly for ten years. Her productions were admired, and she soon became famous. Copied from paper to paper, her fugitive poems caught the fancy of the people of what was then known as the "American West," and before long, the great reviewers of the East thought her talent worthy of their respect. Prentice, as well as Rufus Wilmot Griswold and Edgar Allan Poe, were among the critics who praised Welby's light melody and varied fancy, while also pointing out her lack of discipline and lack of originality. Poe was one of her warmest friends.

When a volume of her poems appeared in 1844, it quickly passed through several editions, and many of her songs were set to music. In 1845, a small octavo volume of her poems, published in Boston, proved so popular that D. Appleton & Company sought and obtained the right of publication, bringing out fifteen editions within the next fifteen years.

Her most famous poem, "The Rainbow", was included in George Frederick Holmes' Fifth Reader, a series of school books that were prominent in the South during the last quarter of the 19th century.

I sometimes have thoughts, in my loneliest hours,
That lie on my heart like the dew on the flowers,
Of a ramble I took one bright afternoon
When my heart was as light as a blossom in June"—

== Style and themes ==
She began writing poetry at the age of 18, with the theme of a regretted past featuring prominently in her work. Though "Summer Birds" furnishes matter for the morning or noontide, after a few cheery verses, she introduces "beneath the moon's pale ray" and "among the tombs". Here, as in so many of her poems, sea, sky, and loved ones come out of the past. Mnemosyne, the goddess of memory, was her favorite muse.

Her prevailing mood being reminiscent, it was attended by sadness and melancholy. She frequently focused on twilight and moonlight, and themes of death, religious hope, and faith.

Light, varied fancy, tender sentiment, a persistent note of pathos, a prompt and facile rhythm -— these were the qualities that won for Welby at the beginning a generous welcome. From the 74 pieces included in the fullest edition of her poetry, a varied selection was made, and her ability was evident. A tone of quiet personal confidence, revealed the melancholy that mused upon a happy past. The critics acknowledged her gift, and discerned signs of promise.

Had that promise been fulfilled, her songs would have kept much of the popularity they first won. Instead, monotony and dullness took the place of memories and fancies. Her theme, but not her energy, became exhausted, and, conscious of this state, she became sad at heart. Her narrow range of experience with the tendency to self-repetition, the lack of literary discipline with the tendency to diffuseness, went against her fame in the long run.

Welby might have attained high rank among the lyric poets if her skills from the first had been steadily disciplined. But she was unschooled and unguided, as she herself confessed: "'Tis with an untaught hand I sweep the chords." Left, therefore, to her own accord, she repeated herself not only from one poem to another, but not infrequently from stanza to stanza. She lacked skill with condensation, and nearly all her pieces showed twice too many words. The early critics warned her against repetition and diffuseness, but she chose not to take heed. The last four years of her life were lived in silence.

== Personal life ==
In 1838, at the age of nineteen, she married George B. Welby, a merchant of Louisville. She died in Louisville, May 3, 1852, the mother of one child, a son, born two months before her death.
