= Cannonball House (Saint Michaels, Maryland) =

Historic house in Maryland, US

- U.S. National Register of Historic Places
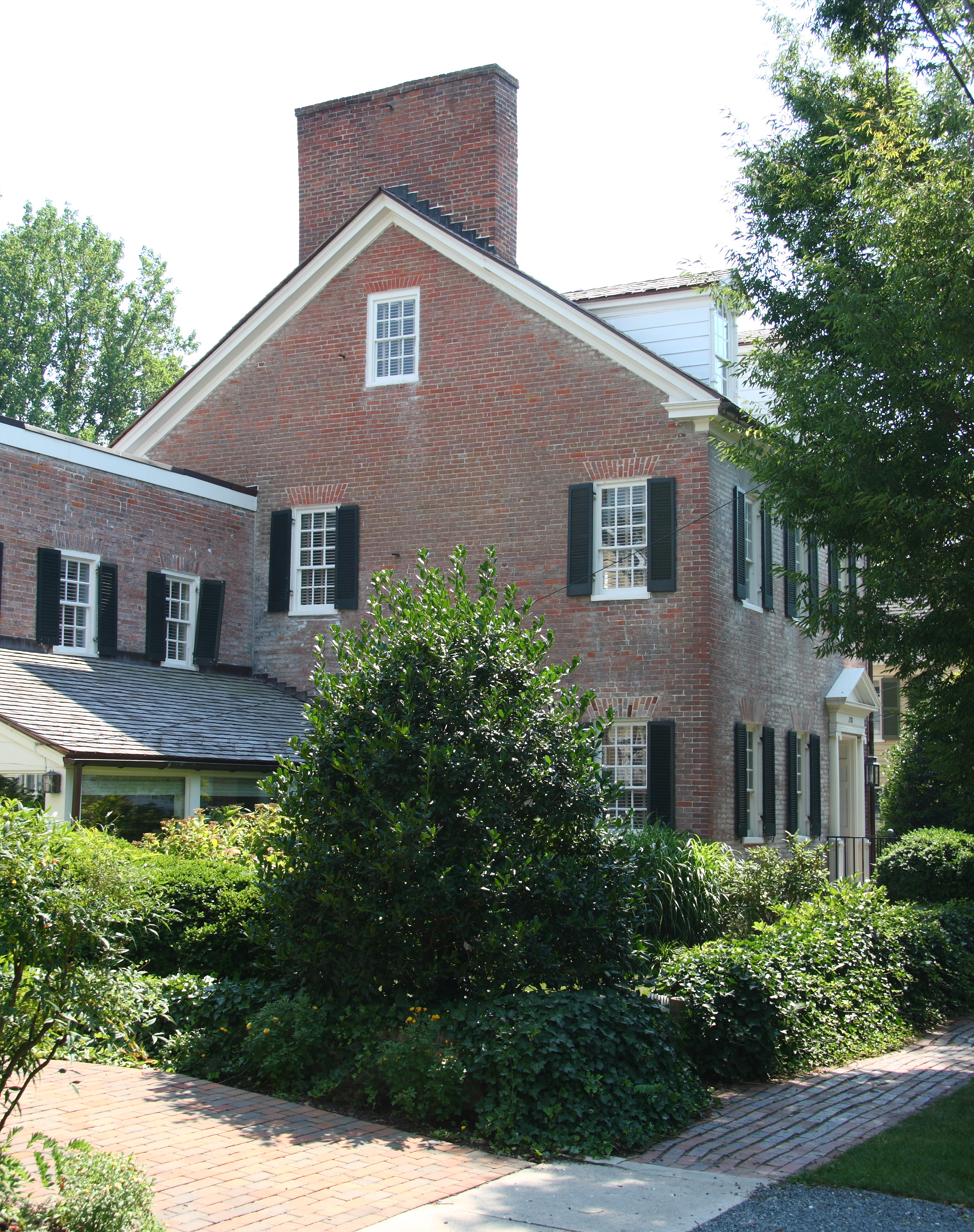

- Location within Maryland Location within the United States
- Location: St. Michaels, Maryland
- Coordinates: 38°47′3″N 76°13′22″W
- Area: less than one acre
- Built: 1810
- Architectural style: Federal
- NRHP reference No.: 80001839
- Added to NRHP: December 3, 1980

The Cannonball House in Saint Michaels, Maryland, United States, is a historic house built in the early 19th century. The Federal style house is a side-hall double-parlor design on a corner lot, built for shipbuilder William Merchant. It is historically notable for an 1813 event in the War of 1812 in which the British fleet bombarded Saint Michaels, leaving a cannonball embedded in the house.

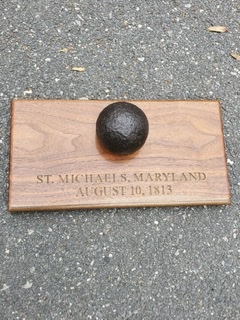
This is the actual cannonball fired into the Cannonball House, St. Michaels, MD

Cannonball House was listed on the National Register of Historic Places in 1983.
