= Maggie Lee =

Maggie Lee may refer to:

- Maggie Lee (skipjack), a Chesapeake Bay skipjack
- Maggie Lee (wrestler) (born 2002), American professional wrestler
- Maggie Lee, a character from the animated children's television series Maya & Miguel

== See also ==
- Margaret Lee (disambiguation)
