= Mary W. Somers (skipjack) =

- MARY W. SOMERS (Chesapeake Bay skipjack)
- U.S. National Register of Historic Places
- Location within Maryland Location within the United States
- Nearest city: St. Marys City, Maryland
- Coordinates: 38°27′12″N 77°3′6″W
- Built: 1904
- NRHP reference No.: 76002173
- Added to NRHP: October 08, 1976

The Mary W. Somers is a Chesapeake Bay skipjack, built in 1904 at Mearsville, Virginia. She is a 41.9-foot-long (12.8 m) two-sail bateau, or "V"-bottomed deadrise type of centerboard sloop. She is one of the 35 surviving traditional Chesapeake Bay skipjacks and a member of the last commercial sailing fleet in the United States. She is located at St. Marys City, St. Mary's County, Maryland.

She was listed on the National Register of Historic Places in 1976.
