= Ruby G. Ford (skipjack) =

- RUBY G. FORD
- U.S. National Register of Historic Places
- Location within Maryland Location within the United States
- Location: Gibsontown Rd., Tilghman, Maryland
- Coordinates: 38°42′46″N 76°19′53″W
- Built: 1891
- Architectural style: Skipjack
- MPS: Chesapeake Bay Skipjack Fleet TR
- NRHP reference No.: 85001096
- Added to NRHP: May 16, 1985

The Ruby G. Ford was a Chesapeake Bay skipjack, built in 1891 at Fairmount, Maryland. She was a 45-foot-long (14 m) two-sail bateau, or "V"-bottomed deadrise type of centerboard sloop. She had a beam of 15.6 feet (4.8 m), a depth of 2.6 feet (0.79 m), and a net tonnage of 5 register tons. She was one of the 35 surviving traditional Chesapeake Bay skipjacks and a member of the last commercial sailing fleet in the United States.

According to a first-hand account by Christopher White in his book Skipjack, pp. 292–296, St. Martin's Press, published in 2009, the Ruby G. Ford was burned to complete destruction, torched by Captain Bart Murphy, who owned her at the time and did not have funds enough to restore her from a state of grave disrepair.

She was listed on the National Register of Historic Places in 1985.

A photo can be found on pg. 190-191 in the NGM of Feb. 1972.
