= Tilghman Island, Maryland =

- CDP
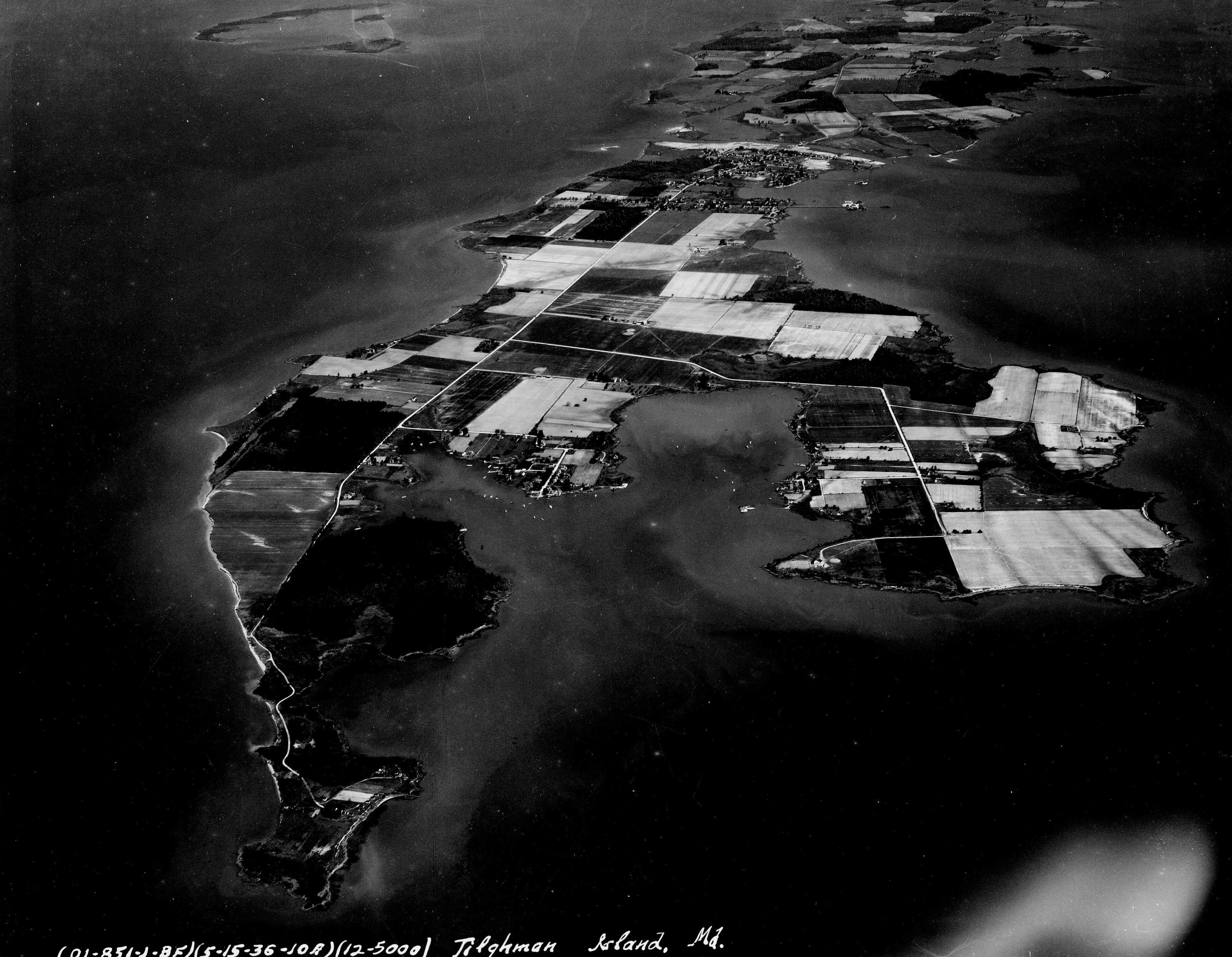
- Aerial view, 1930s

- Location of Tilghman Island, Maryland
- Coordinates: 38°42′32″N 76°20′6″W
- Country: United States
- State: Maryland
- County: Talbot

Area
  - Total: 2.54 sq mi (6.57 km^{2})
  - Land: 2.40 sq mi (6.21 km^{2})
  - Water: 0.14 sq mi (0.36 km^{2})
- Elevation: 6.6 ft (2 m)

Population (2020)
  - Total: 807
  - Density: 340/sq mi (130/km^{2})
- Time zone: UTC−5 (Eastern (EST))
  - Summer (DST): UTC−4 (EDT)
- ZIP code: 21671
- Area codes: 410, 443, and 667
- FIPS code: 24-77912
- GNIS feature ID: 1852602
- Website: www.tilghmanisland.com

Tilghman Island is an island in the Chesapeake Bay. It is part of Talbot County, Maryland, United States.

== History ==
=== 18th century ===
Initially known as Great Choptank Island, the island became identified with a series of local families. It was owned by Matthew Tilghman's family from 1752 and has been known as Tilghman Island ever since.

=== 19th century ===
During the War of 1812 the island was briefly occupied by the British, who obtained provisions for their military forces. The community of Tilghman appeared in the 1840s. The economy shifted from farming to greater reliance on oystering and fishing as markets developed in Baltimore and Washington, aided by steamboat service in the 1890s.

=== 20th century ===
In 1986, the Island made national news after four residents burned a cross in front of the home of the town's only black family. Following the trial, four Ku Klux Klan members held a rally on the Talbot County Courthouse lawn to protest against the sentences of the three individuals convicted in the cross burning. The victimized family later moved away, blaming the incident and feeling that "the Eastern Shore is way behind the rest of the world."

=== Historic places ===
The E.C. Collier, the Elsworth, the Hilda M. Willing, the Kathryn, the Maggie Lee, the Minnie V, the Nellie L. Byrd, the Paw Paw Cove Site, the Ralph T. Webster, the Rebecca T. Ruark, the Reliance, the Ruby G. Ford, Sharps Island Light, the Sigsbee, and the Virginia W are listed on the National Register of Historic Places.

== Geography ==
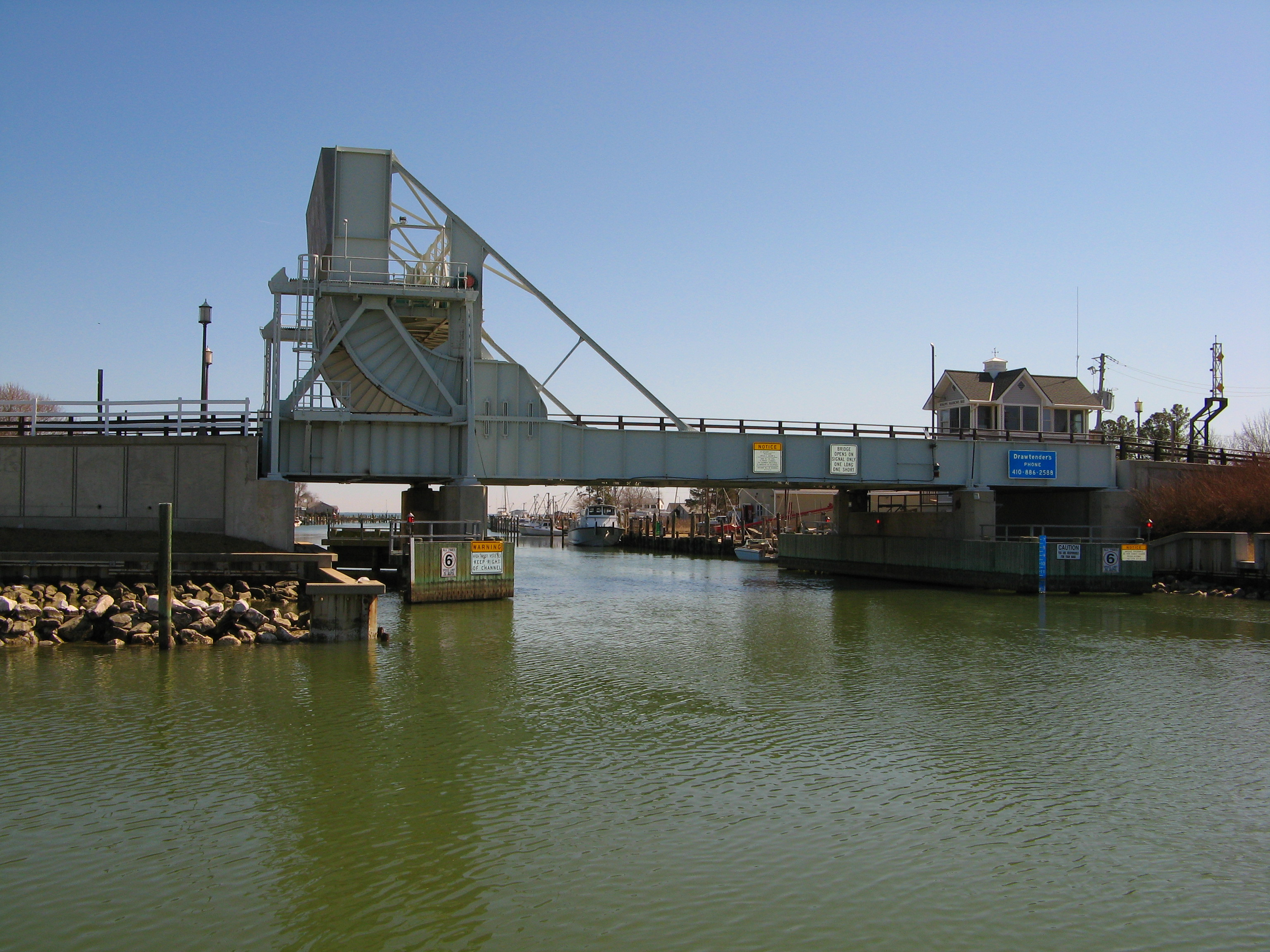
Drawbridge over Knapps Narrows to Tilghman Island

Tilghman Island is located at 38°42′32″N 76°20′6″W (38.708795, −76.335016).

The southern tip of Tilghman Island is covered by Black Walnut Point NRMA, a Maryland state park.

According to the United States Census Bureau, the CDP has a total area of 2.8 square miles (7.3 km^{2}), of which 2.7 square miles (7.0 km^{2}) is land and 0.1 square miles (0.26 km^{2}) (4.91%) is water.

== Demographics ==
Historical population
| Census | Pop. | Note | %± |
|---|---|---|---|
| 2010 | 784 | | — |
| 2020 | 807 | | 2.9% |
U.S. Decennial Census

As of the census of 2010, there were 784 people, 357 households, and 246 families residing in the CDP. The population density was 315.9 inhabitants per square mile (122.0/km^{2}). There were 560 housing units at an average density of 207.1 per square mile (80.0/km^{2}). The racial makeup of the CDP was 97.3% White, 1.4% African American, 0.5% Native American, 0.5% Asian, and 0.3% from two or more races. Hispanic or Latino of any race were 0.6% of the population.

There were 368 households, out of which 24.7% had children under the age of 18 living with them, 64.9% were married couples living together, 3.8% had a female householder with no husband present, and 28.8% were non-families. 23.9% of all households were made up of individuals, and 11.1% had someone living alone who was 65 years of age or older. The average household size was 2.32 and the average family size was 2.72.

In the CDP, the population was spread out, with 19.2% under the age of 18, 5.3% from 18 to 24, 23.8% from 25 to 44, 29.7% from 45 to 64, and 22.0% who were 65 years of age or older. The median age was 46 years. For every 100 females, there were 104.3 males. For every 100 females age 18 and over, there were 100.0 males.

The median income for a household in the CDP was $32,763, and the median income for a family was $38,304. Males had a median income of $21,213 versus $24,286 for females. The per capita income for the CDP was $13,851. About 8.7% of families and 17.7% of the population were below the poverty line, including 24.4% of those under age 18 and 8.9% of those age 65 or over.

== Education ==
The entire county is in the Talbot County Public Schools school district.
