= Echo Hill Outdoor School =

Outdoor school in Kent County, Maryland, U.S.

Coordinates: 39°21′29″N 76°6′48″W

Information
- Established: 1972; 53 years ago

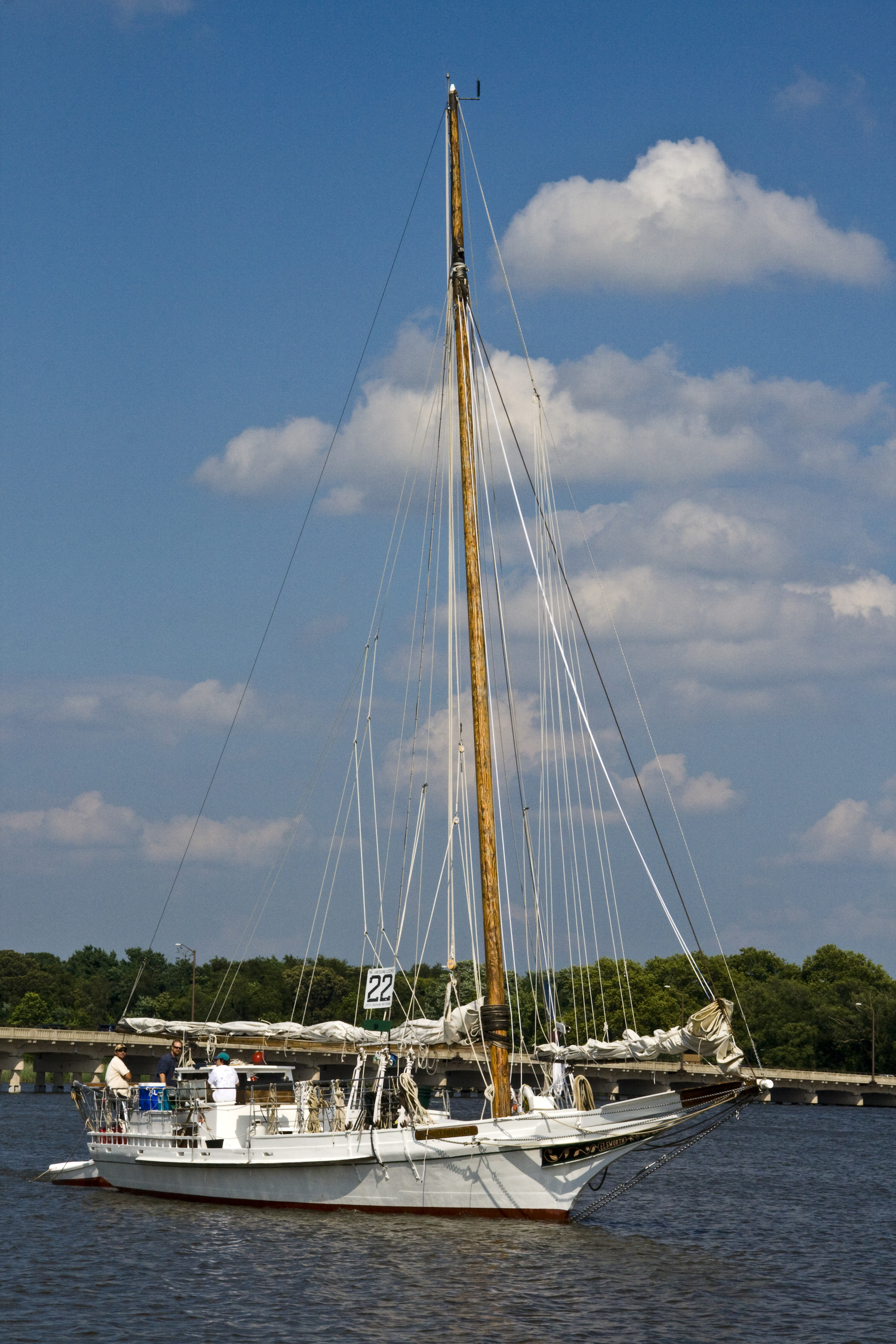
Elsworth at Chestertown

The Echo Hill Outdoor School was founded in 1972 by Peter P. Rice Jr. and is located near Betterton in Kent County on Maryland's Eastern Shore. The School provides 1 to 5 day programs for children and adults from public and private schools throughout the Mid-Atlantic in experiential education and the ecology of the Chesapeake Bay and its surrounding ecosystems.

The school owns the Chesapeake Bay skipjack Elsworth, the oyster buyboat Annie D. and two work boats, the Spirit and Twilight for use in marine education programs.

Registered in Maryland as Echo Hill Outdoor School, Inc. since October 18, 1972, the school is a 501(c)(3) nonprofit organization. It operates on a 70-acre campus of open fields and forest, at the edge of a 172-acre freshwater marsh, which the school also owns. The school's teachers use the surrounding outdoor environment as a classroom and laboratory for educational programs emphasizing environmental studies.

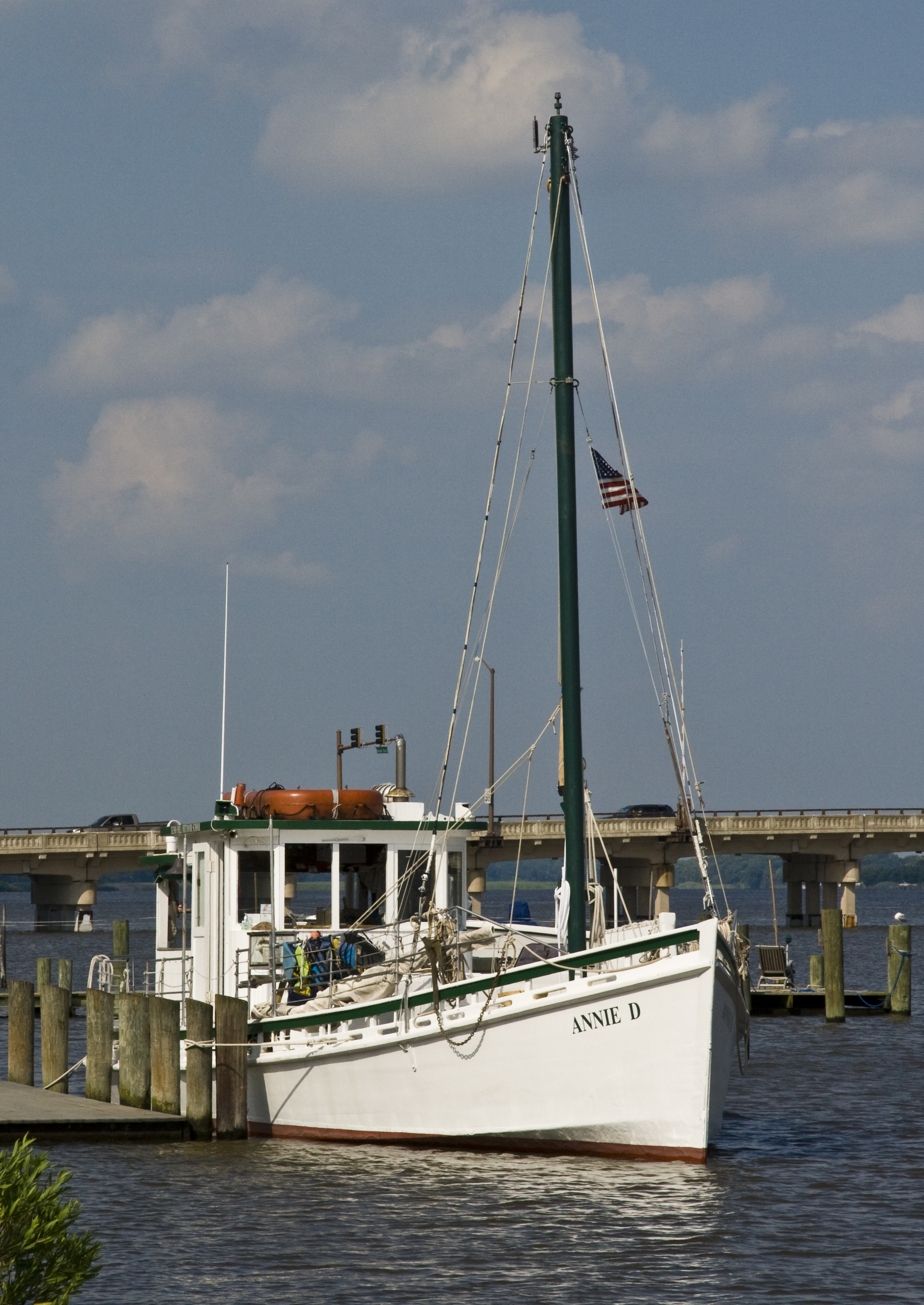
Annie D. at Chestertown
