= Bronza Parks =

American boatbuilder (died 1958)

Bronza M. Parks
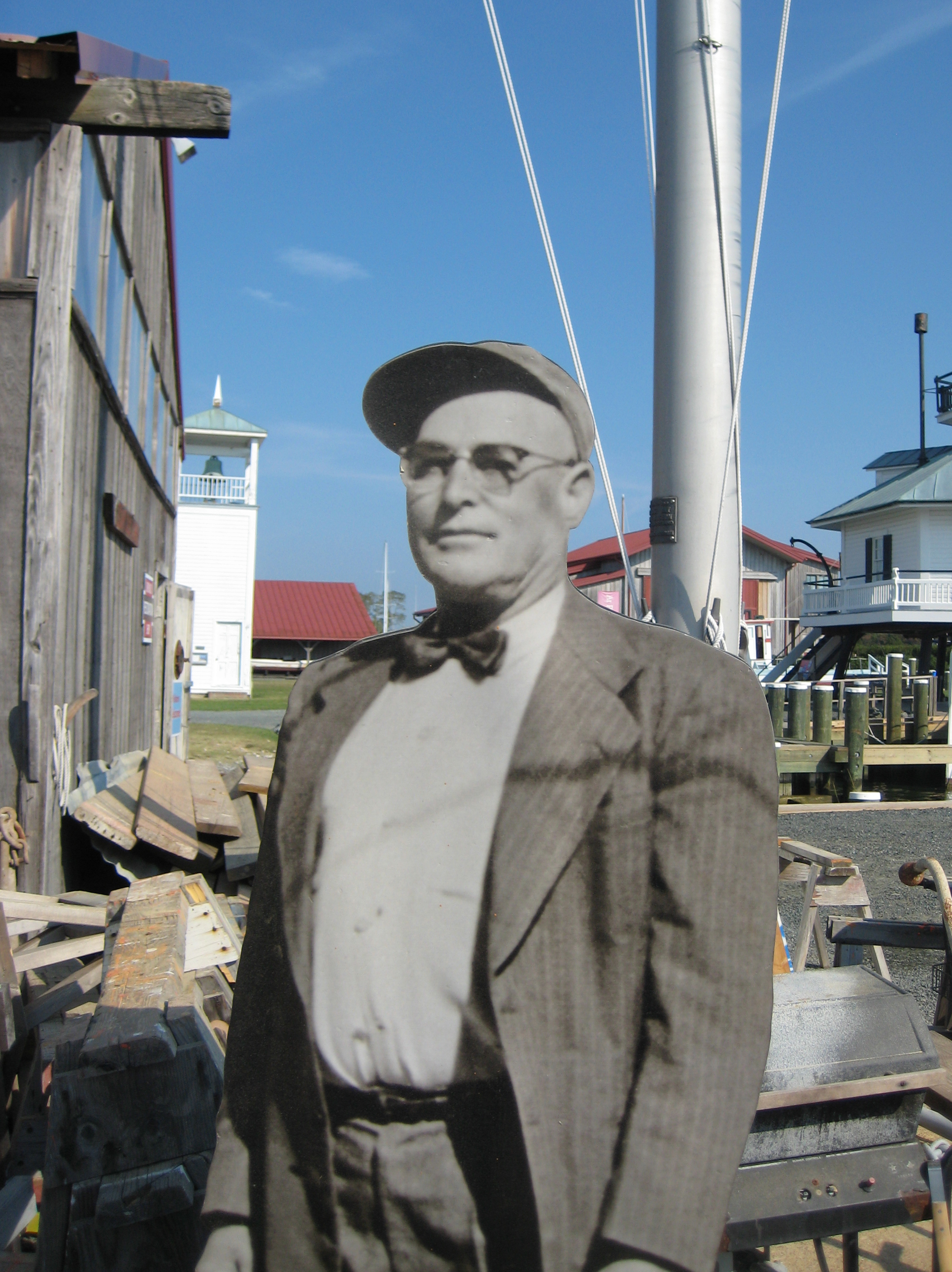
- Cutout of Bronza Parks at the Chesapeake Bay Maritime Museum
- Died: May 13, 1958; Wingate, Maryland
- Cause of death: Murder
- Resting place: Dorchester Memorial Park, Cambridge, Maryland
- Occupation: Boatbuilder
- Known for: Builder of skipjacks
- Spouse: Katie Lewis
- Children: Irene, Joyce, Lucille, Martha, Mary

Bronza M. "Bronzie" Parks (died May 13, 1958) was an American boatbuilder from Wingate, Maryland. Parks was the last builder of Chesapeake Bay skipjack sailing vessels.

== Personal life ==
Parks was married to Katie Lewis with whom he had five daughters: Irene, Joyce, Lucille, Martha, and Mary. At the time of his death in 1958, Parks was a candidate for Dorchester County commissioner and president of the Lakes-Straits Fire Department.

== Boatbuilding ==
Parks began building boats at the age of 16 and completed more than 400 vessels during his career. He built his first skipjack, the Wilma Lee, in 1940. The last three skipjacks that Parks completed were the Rosie Parks and the Martha Lewis in 1955 and the Lady Katie in 1956.

== Death ==
In 1958, Parks was working on an 18-foot (5.5 m) skipjack-style sailboat for Willis C. Rowe of Silver Spring, Maryland. During a confrontation with Parks over the cost of the project on May 13, 1958, Rowe shot the boatbuilder three times, killing him. Rowe was eventually convicted of second degree murder and sentenced to 18 years in prison.
