= Hilda M. Willing (skipjack) =

- U.S. National Register of Historic Places
- U.S. National Historic Landmark
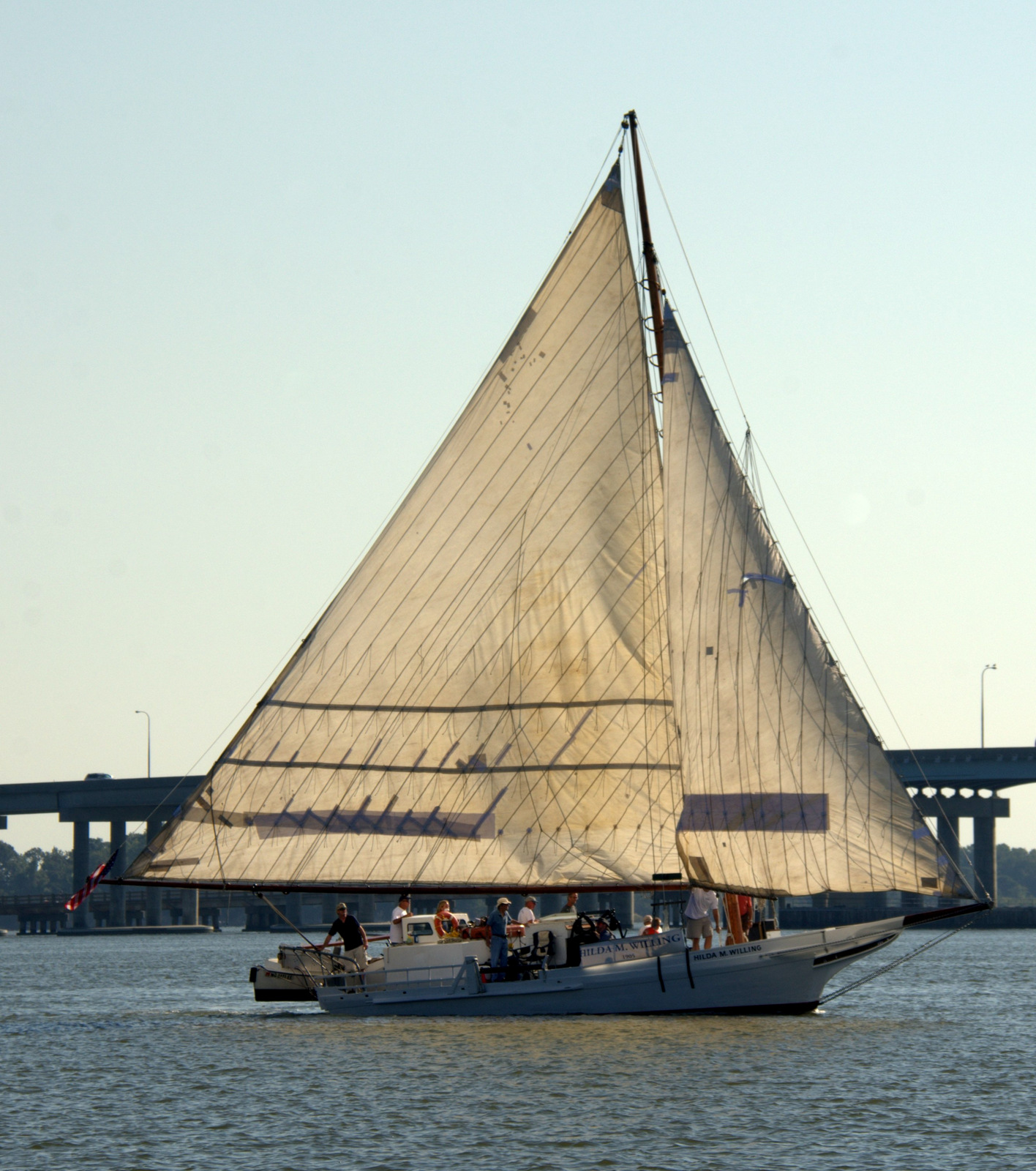

- Location within Maryland Location within the United States
- Location: Deal Island Harbor, Chance, Maryland
- Coordinates: 38°10′37″N 75°56′21″W
- Built: 1905
- MPS: Chesapeake Bay Skipjack Fleet TR
- NRHP reference No.: 85001089

Significant dates
- Added to NRHP: May 16, 1985
- Designated NHL: April 19, 1994

Hilda M. Willing is a relatively small Chesapeake Bay skipjack, built in 1905 at Oriole, Maryland, and declared a National Historic Landmark in 1994.

The Willing is particularly noteworthy as an example of a small skipjack with good sailing qualities. Her home port is Tilghman Island, Maryland.

== History ==
The Hilda M. Willing was built in 1905 at Oriole, Maryland on the Manokin River off Tangier Sound, in Somerset County, Maryland. Her home port was Crisfield, Maryland. In 1926 her owner was Samuel L. Laird of Oriole. Laird sold her to Thornton Webster of Wenona in 1927, who sold her on to Roland Bozman of Wenona in 1929. Bozman sold the Willing to R.E. Hoffman, and she was resold to Addie M. Jones by 1941. She was owned by T. Rayner Graham in 1943, who abandoned her in Annapolis. She was purchased for $400 by Leslie Pope of Oxford, Maryland who moved her to Cambridge, Maryland, then sold her to Robert F. "Pete" Sweitzer in 1947 for $1600. Sweitzer owned the Willing into the 1990s and did much of the repair and maintenance work on her himself.

Sweitzer altered the Willing to suit technological advances. He was the first to use an automobile engine instead of the then-common one-cylinder Hettinger engines to operate the dredge gear. The installation of this engine meant that the skipjack's freeboard could be raised 8 inches (20 cm) for better stability, as the power assist made the low freeboard of pre-1930 skipjacks less necessary. Sweitzer lengthened the boom, deepened the centerboard and added a small skeg to the keel. He also took the traditional extreme rake out of the mast, making it vertical.

In November 2011, Hilda M. Willing was brought home to the Eastern Shore of Maryland and dredged until 2014 by Capt. David Whitelock. Wade H. Murphy III bought her in late summer 2014 and is currently dredging out of Tilghman Island MD.

Willing's sailing qualities are among the best in the skipjack fleet. It is stated that she is the only skipjack that can come about without the use of the centerboard, and that she can dredge in strong winds without a jib.

== Description ==
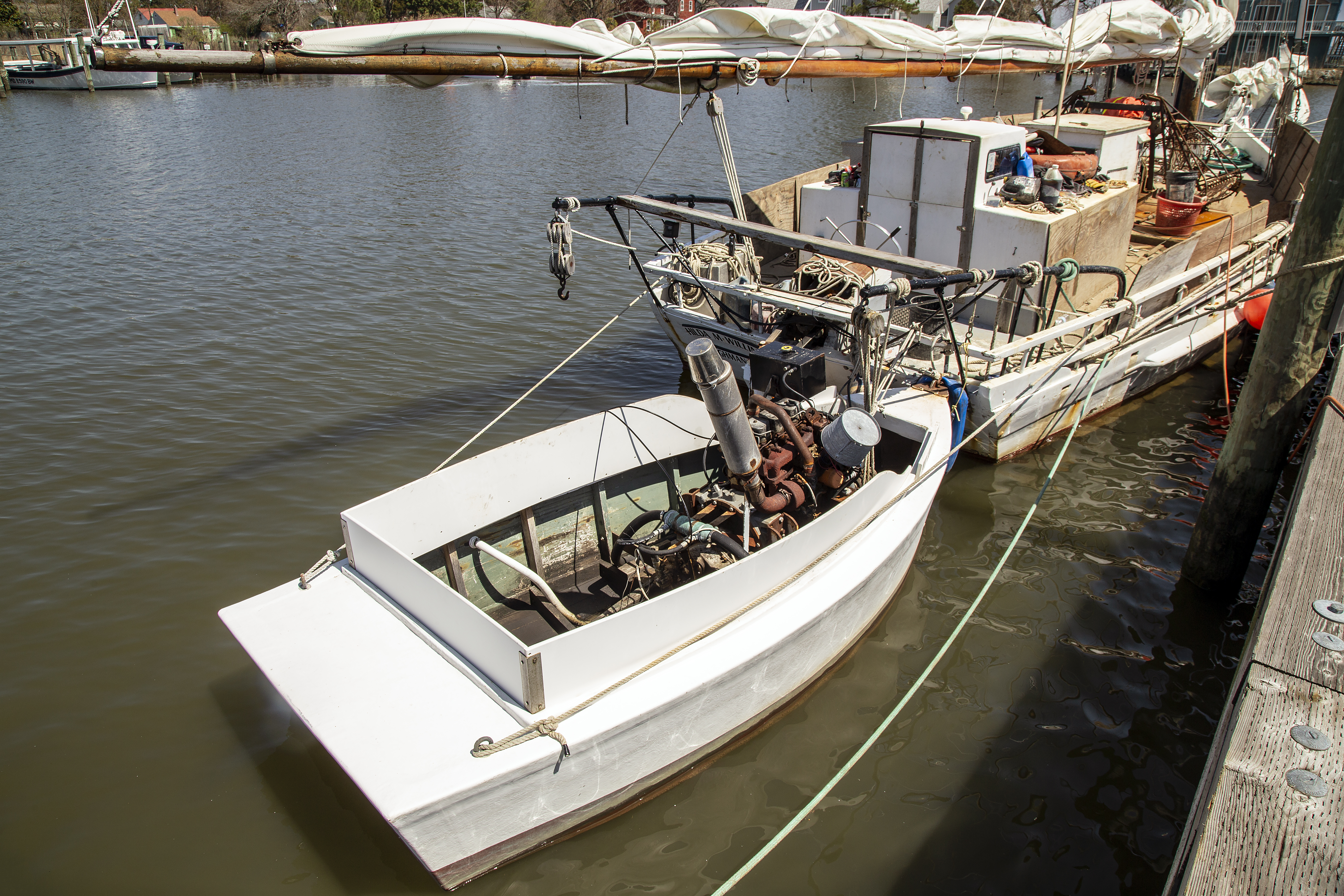
Willing and pushboat

The Willing is 40 feet (12 m) long, 14 feet (4.3 m) wide and draws 3.08 feet (0.94 m). She has a traditional clipper bow-shaped cutwater in a sharp, but convex bow, and a square transom. She carries a pushblock for a pushboat to allow her to dredge in light airs. The king plank runs from the bow past the mast, but stops short of the main hatch. Following a second, smaller hatch, a small doghouse is set on the deck to provide low headroom in what would otherwise be a very low cabin, 2.5 feet (0.76 m) high. A box at the stern contains the hydraulic steering gear installed by Sweitzer to replace the original patent gear. Davits for the pushboat hang over the transom.

The Willing is rigged with a jib-headed mainsail, or leg-of-mutton, with a single large jib. She carries dredges on each side with a shared motor. She is assigned Maryland dredge number 1.

== See also ==
- The Kathryn, another historic listed skipjack.
- List of U.S. National Historic Landmark ships, shipwrecks, and shipyards
