= Ralph T. Webster (skipjack) =

- RALPH T. WEBSTER
- U.S. National Register of Historic Places
- Location within Maryland Location within the United States
- Location: Gibsontown Rd., Tilghman, Maryland
- Coordinates: 38°42′46″N 76°19′53″W
- Built: 1905
- Architectural style: Skipjack
- MPS: Chesapeake Bay Skipjack Fleet TR
- NRHP reference No.: 85001094
- Added to NRHP: May 16, 1985

The Ralph T. Webster is a Chesapeake Bay skipjack, built in 1905 at Oriole, Maryland. She is a 47.7' long two-sail bateau, or "V"-bottomed deadrise type of centerboard sloop. She has a beam of 15.3' and a depth of 3.5', with net registered tonnage of 8 tons. She one of the 35 surviving traditional Chesapeake Bay skipjacks and a member of the last commercial sailing fleet in the United States. She is located at Tilghman, Talbot County, Maryland.

She was listed on the National Register of Historic Places in 1985.
