= List of threatened historic sites in the United States =

This article provides a List of threatened historic sites in the United States. A site is deemed historic if it has been listed on the National Register of Historic Places or an official State or Local landmark list. While there are many historic places in the U.S. that are not listed in an official government listing of landmarks, the purpose of this article is to report threats only to government-listed landmarks. A site is deemed threatened for this article if there is verifiable information that it is threatened. Documentation may include:

- credible reports in publications, including news articles
- listing on various watch organizations' lists

== United States sites which are both historic and threatened ==
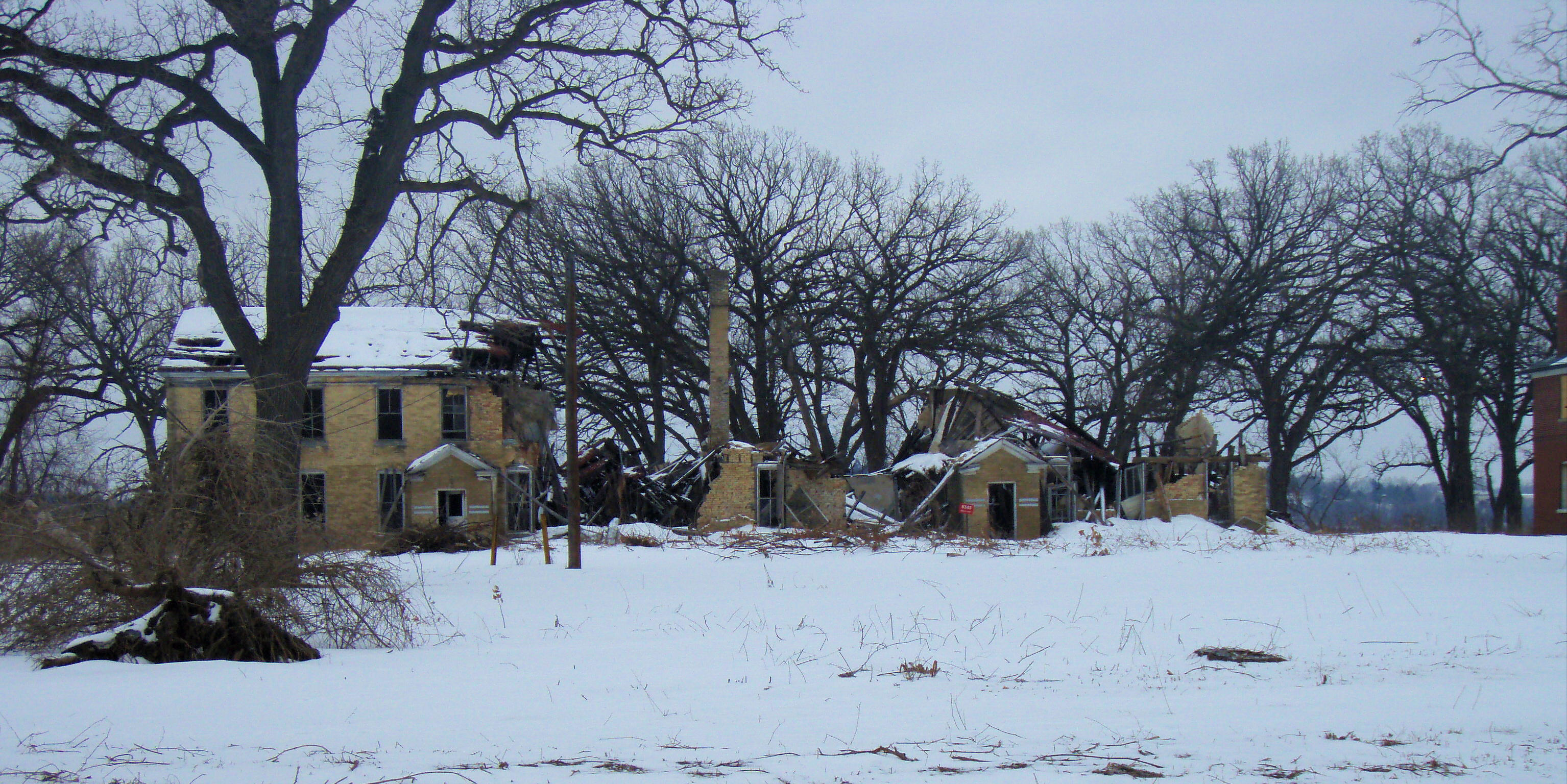
The former quartermasters' shops at the upper post of Fort Snelling. Large sections of the roof and the brick walls have collapsed.

- Fort Jackson and Fort St. Philip in Plaquemines Parish, Louisiana were heavily damaged in Hurricanes Katrina and Rita. They are forts that were battlegrounds in the American Civil War and are National Historic Landmarks. Both are listed by the Civil War Preservation Trust in 2006 as among the Top 10 Endangered Civil War Battlefields.
- The upper post area of Fort Snelling, a National Historic Landmark in Minneapolis–St. Paul, Minnesota, is listed with a threat level of "emergency" by the National Historic Landmarks Program and was named as one of America's 11 Most Endangered Historic Places. While the original fort buildings dating back to the 1820s have been reconstructed and are operated as a historic site by the Minnesota Historical Society, newer buildings built after the 1880s are deteriorating rapidly.
- The SS United States, a passenger liner built in 1952 for the United States Lines. She captured the Blue Riband on her maiden voyage in 1952—with the fastest eastbound and westbound transatlantic crossings record of three days, twelve hours, and twelve minutes. To this day she holds both the fastest westbound and eastbound transit records. The ship's fate is unknown and has been in disregard for many years since her retirement in 1969.
- The Beckley Courthouse Square Historic District, listed on the National Register of Historic Places in Beckley, West Virginia, was added to the list of most endangered historical resources in West Virginia by the Preservation Alliance of West Virginia (PAWV). The 2015 nomination resulted from a declaration by the State Historic Preservation Office that the district could be removed from the national register as the result of the inappropriate alteration of contributing structures. The PAWV declared in its assessment that the threat was the result of the nonfeasance of the city landmarks commission.

== Organizations which note threatened status ==
- National Park Service of the United States monitors the status of National Historic Landmark sites, many of which are privately owned.
- World Monuments Fund covers a top 100 list worldwide, several of which in the United States. For example, following Hurricane Katrina, it lists New Orleans as a whole, which includes many NRHP sites. Of the NRHPs in New Orleans, some in low-lying areas were damaged by Katrina and remain threatened while others in the French Quarter and elsewhere were not and are not.
- Civil War Preservation Trust
- The Alabama Historical Commission names Alabama's top 10 threatened historic sites in their yearly "Places in Peril" listing.
- The Northwest Georgia Threatened Historic Sites Project identified 19 threatened historic sites in Georgia, some of which may be NRHPs.
- National Trust for Historic Preservation lists America's 11 Most Endangered Historic Places.
- Preservation Maryland identifies a top 10 Endangered Maryland Sites each year. 2009 listings are here, and include the skipjack Flora A. Price.

== See also ==
- America's Most Endangered Places
