= Nellie L. Byrd (skipjack) =

- NELLIE L. BYRD
- U.S. National Register of Historic Places
- Location within Maryland Location within the United States
- Location: Middle River, Maryland
- Coordinates: 39°19′19″N 76°25′37″W
- Built: 1911
- Architectural style: Skipjack
- MPS: Chesapeake Bay Skipjack Fleet TR
- NRHP reference No.: 85001093
- Added to NRHP: May 16, 1985

The Nellie L. Byrd is a Chesapeake Bay skipjack, built in 1911 at Oriole, Maryland. She is a 53.6' long two-sail bateau, or "V"-bottomed deadrise type of centerboard sloop. She has a beam of 26.7', a depth of 4.8', and a net tonnage of 18 tons. She is one of the 35 surviving traditional Chesapeake Bay skipjacks and a member of the last commercial sailing fleet in the United States. When listed, she was located at Tilghman, Talbot County, Maryland. Since 2005, she is located at Middle River, Maryland, Baltimore County, Maryland.

She was listed on the National Register of Historic Places in 1985 and received a Save America's Treasures grant in 2006. She is assigned Maryland dredge number 28.
