= Sharps Island Light =

Lighthouse in Maryland, United States

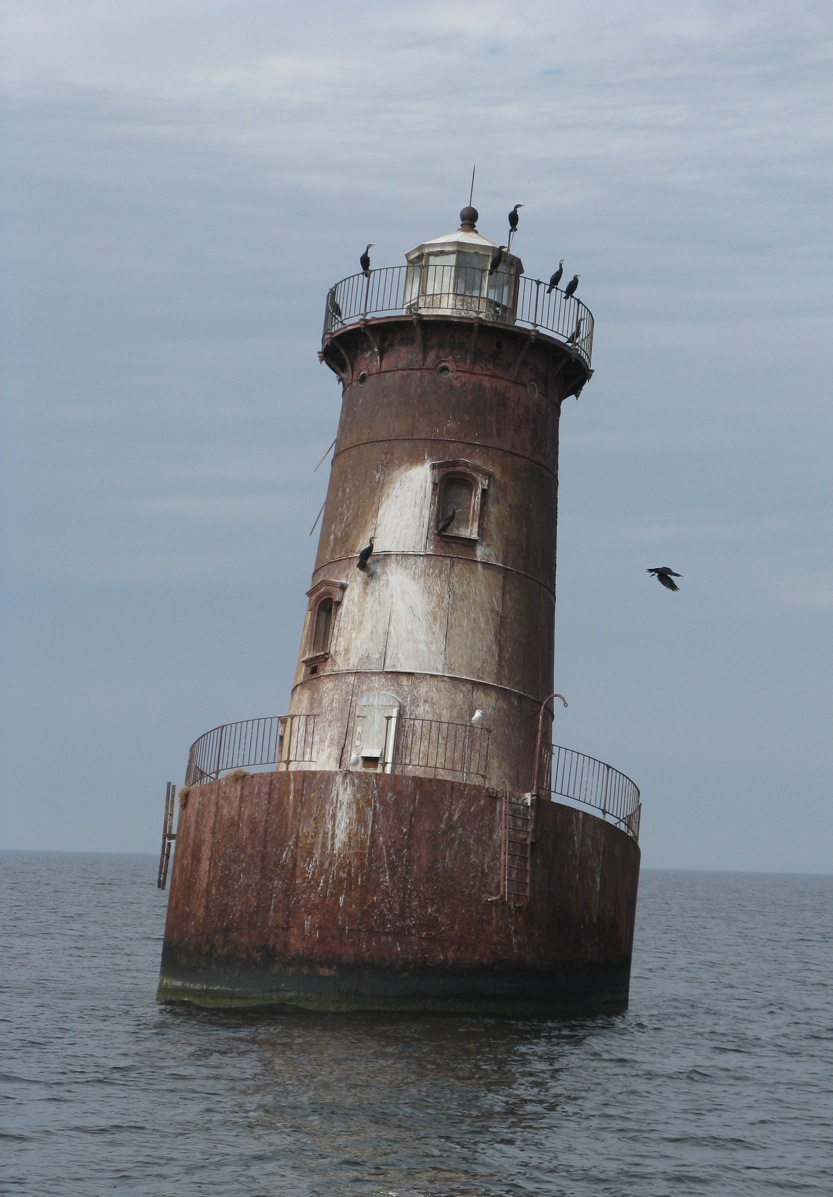
- Sharps Island Light, 2009
- Location: SW of Tilghman Island, Chesapeake Bay, Maryland
- Coordinates: 38.6391°N 76.3757°W

Tower
- Foundation: Concrete caisson
- Construction: Cast iron
- Automated: 1938
- Height: 45 feet (14 m)
- Shape: Frustum of a cone
- Heritage: National Register of Historic Places listed place

Light
- First lit: 1838 (original), 1866 (second), 1882 (current)
- Deactivated: 2010
- Lens: Fourth-order Fresnel (original), 9.8 inches (250 mm) acrylic (current)
- Sharps Island Light
- U.S. National Register of Historic Places
- Nearest city: Tilghman Island, Maryland
- Area: 5 acres (2.0 ha)
- Built: 1882
- NRHP reference No.: 82002821
- Added to NRHP: July 22, 1982

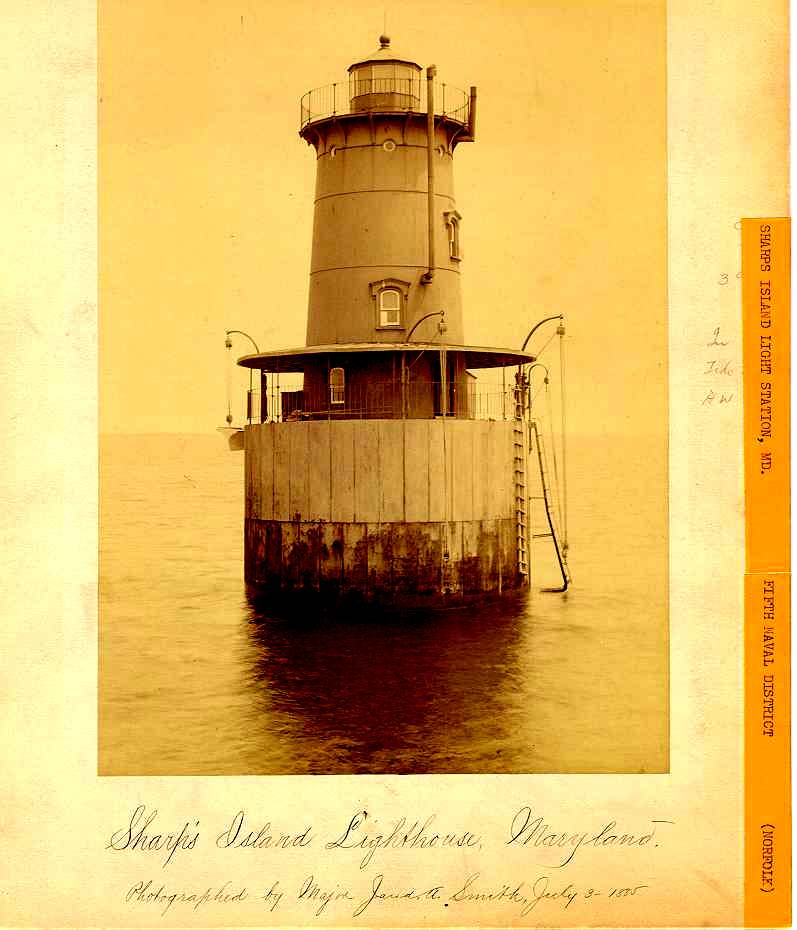
1885 photo of lighthouse, when it was still upright

The Sharps Island Light is the third lighthouse to stand nearly 3 miles (5 km) south-southwest from the southern end of Tilghman Island in Maryland's Chesapeake Bay. The structure is best known today for evoking the Leaning Tower of Pisa, a condition caused by an ice floe in 1977.

The first lighthouse was built on Sharps Island in 1838, but due to the island's erosion it was moved in 1848. In a report from Stephen Pleasonton, the general superintendent of the United States Treasury Department's Lighthouse Establishment, the lighthouse was described as having:

10 lamps; Jeremiah Valiant, keeper...Dwelling-house is built of wood, two stories high, with the lanterns on the roof. The plastering to the rooms is much cracked, but it is not of much consequence, as it is unoccupied. The keeper's son sleeps in it of nights to take care of the lights. Found the lamps and reflectors good and clean.

This was replaced with a screwpile lighthouse in 1866 near the original location of the first structure.

The second lighthouse lasted until 1881 when it was forced off its foundations by an ice floe. It floated nearly five miles down the Chesapeake—with its keepers still inside—until it ran aground, allowing the men to escape unharmed.

The third light was manufactured by the Builder's Iron Company of Providence, Rhode Island. It consisted of a cylindrical caisson 30 feet (9.1 m) in diameter and 30 feet (9.1 m) tall. It was constructed of cast iron plates which were 1.5 inches (3.8 cm) thick. These were bolted together on site. The caisson was sunk approximately 10 feet (3.0 m) into the bottom and then filled with concrete to resist the force of waves and ice. On top of the caisson was a cylindrical tower 45 feet (14 m) tall, which tapered from 18 feet (5.5 m) in diameter at its base to 12 feet (3.7 m) at the top. The iron plates forming the tower were 5/8 inch (1.6 cm) thick.

The new light was built by the 5th Lighthouse District Engineer, O. E. Babcock, his staff, and a temporary force of laborers recruited for the project. Laborers were paid $2.40 a day plus board, and proved difficult to recruit in sufficient numbers. USLHT Tulip carried men and materials to the site. Tulip's replacement, the newly-launched USLHT Jessamine, with Babcock aboard, sailed for Sharp's Island on 27 September 1881, even before she was officially commissioned. She took a load of iron plates from Baltimore on 22 November 1881. On 15 December 1881 Jessamine left Baltimore with the last iron plates for the new lighthouse.

The current light, a sparkplug lighthouse, was completed in 1882. Its fourth-order Fresnel lens was replaced with a 9.8-inch (250 mm) lens in 1977; the focal plane is 54 feet (16 m) above sea level. The tower includes an integral dwelling and was staffed until 1938 when the United States Coast Guard automated the light. Leaning by about 15° since it was ice-damaged in 1977, the structure is picturesque, but in poor condition.

The Sharps Island Light was listed on the National Register of Historic Places (reference # 82002821) on July 22, 1982. It is one of the many historic features along Captain John Smith Chesapeake National Historic Trail.

It is also on the Lighthouse Digest Doomsday List of endangered lighthouses.

As of 2006, the lighthouse was a candidate for sale under the National Historic Lighthouse Preservation Act. It was deactivated in January 2010.
