= Rebecca T. Ruark =

- U.S. National Register of Historic Places
- U.S. National Historic Landmark
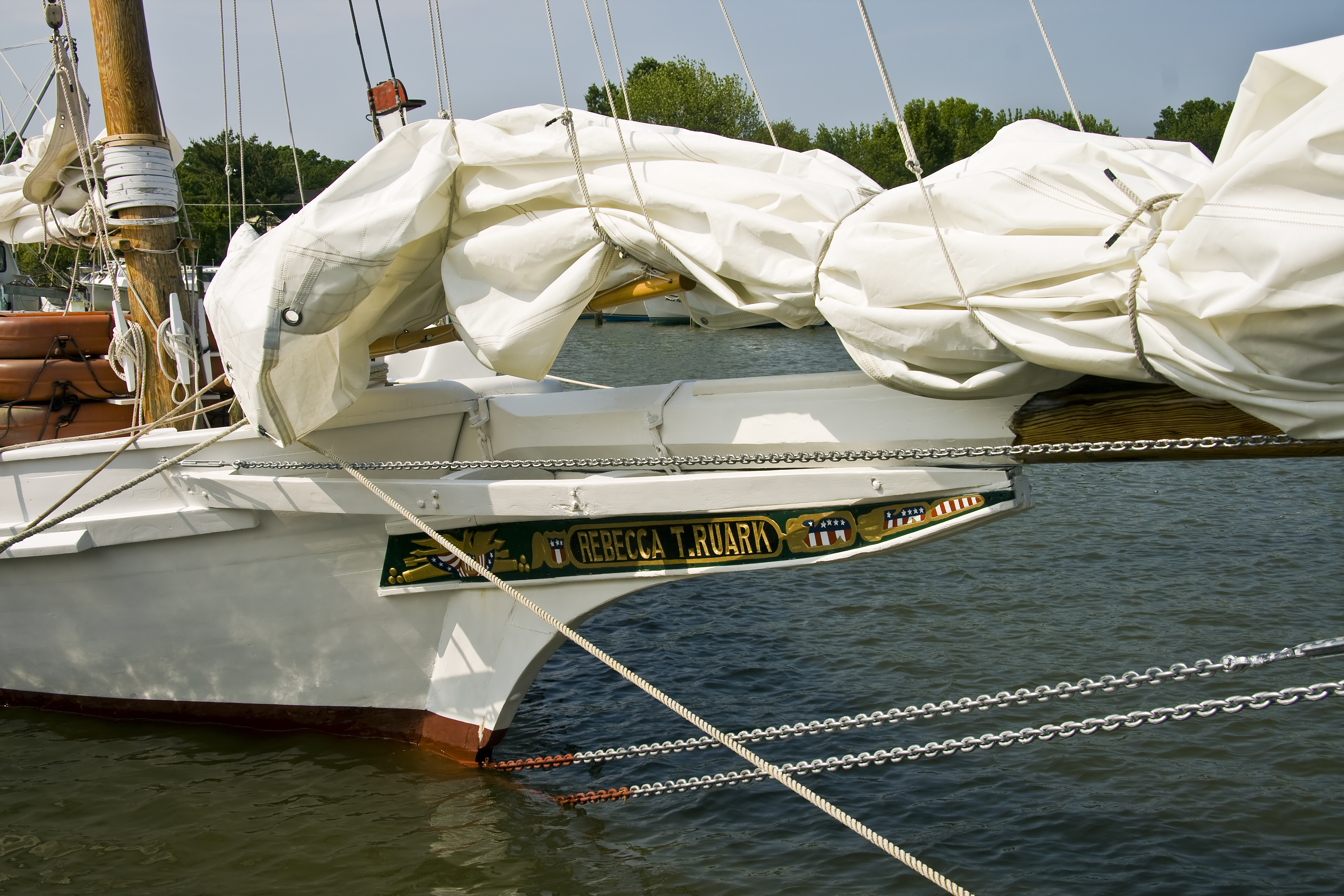

- Location within Maryland Location within the United States
- Location: Tilghman, Maryland
- Coordinates: 38°42′46″N 76°19′53″W
- Built: 1896
- MPS: Chesapeake Bay Skipjack Fleet TR
- NRHP reference No.: 85001095

Significant dates
- Added to NRHP: May 16, 1985
- Designated NHL: July 31, 2003

Rebecca T. Ruark is a Chesapeake Bay skipjack built at Taylor's Island, Maryland. She is homeported at Tilghman Island, Maryland. Built in 1896, she is the oldest surviving skipjack in the Chesapeake Bay fleet. She was designated a National Historic Landmark in 2003.

== Description ==
The Rebecca T. Ruark is a typical sloop-rigged skipjack, built for the shallow draft, low freeboard and high stability needed to work the Chesapeake Bay oyster beds. She has a rounded chine with a sharp, convex clipper bow on a sloop hull. The Ruark is fore-and-aft planked. Her wood plug rudder is carried well forward beneath the transom, astern of the centerboard. As part of her 2000 U.S. Coast Guard certification to carry passengers for hire she received a watertight bulkhead ahead of the mast. An aluminum hatch provides access into the new space, which is used for sail and line storage. The deck is 2-inch (5.1 cm) fir forward of the main hatch and pressure-treated pine aft. Deck beams are oak, with two 11.5-inch (29 cm) king planks running from the bow to the main hatch. A central hatch measures 55 inches (140 cm) long by 64.75 inches (164.5 cm) wide. Behind the hatch is a small trunk cabin with a three-sided doghouse aft, with double doors leading from the doghouse to the hold. A fuel tank for the push boat is on the starboard side of the cabin. Pipe rails have been added for passenger carriage.

The Rebecca T. Ruark carries a standard skipjack rig of jib-headed mainsail and a large jib. The present mast is new from 2000 and is 12 inches (30 cm) in diameter and 69 feet (21 m) high. The Dacron mainsail is laced at the bottom and carried by hoops on the mast. The jib is clubbed along its foot. For dredging work the Ruark carries a powered pushboat from davits over her stern.

The Ruark has been extensively rebuilt, with her keel, keelson, some ribs and portions of the centerboard trunk believed to be original. She does, however, retain her original appearance, with some concessions to the passenger excursion trade.

She is assigned Maryland dredge number 29.

== History ==
The Rebecca T. Ruark is the oldest skipjack in the Chesapeake Bay fleet. Her rounded chines went out of style in favor of simpler-to-build sharp chines, at the cost of favorable sailing qualities in the newer flat-bottomed boats. She was built by Moses Geoghegan in 1896 at Taylor's Island, Maryland for William T. Ruark, and named for Ruark's wife. She is stated to have originally been rigged as a two-masted schooner and converted to a sloop. The saddle for a mainmast was claimed to have existed until a 1986 rebuild, however, she is known to have carried a sloop rig since 1896. She was homeported in Baltimore, Maryland until 1899, then moved to Crisfield, Maryland before moving back to Baltimore in 1902. In 1923 W. Alvin Cook of Cambridge, Maryland bought her and moved her to Cambridge. He sold her to Herman B. Cook in 1939 for $5.00. In 1951 Emerson G. Todd and his wife Linda bought her, again for $5.00, and sold one-third shares to Donald S. Todd and Emerson Todd Jr. for $5.00 each. In 1979, following an accident in which two crew members drowned, she was placed in a corporation, Rebecca T. Ruark, Inc., for $30,000. The Todds continued to own her until 1984 when Wade H. Murphy of Tilghman Island, Maryland bought her and kept her at Tilghman.

Murphy took Ruark to Deltaville, Virginia and had her rebuilt in 1986 at a cost of $80,000. Afterwards he continued to use her as she was intended, to dredge oysters. On November 3, 1999, she was caught in a gale at the mouth of the Choptank River and sank in 20 feet (6.1 m) of water, despite attempts to tow her to shelter. A $12,000 grant from the Maryland Port Authority raised her, and she was rehabilitated at a cost of $60,000 in 2000. At that time, her original, damaged mast was cut up and distributed to wood carvers who lived along the Chesapeake Bay. Charles Jobes, of Havre de Grace, Maryland, carved a duck decoy from one of these pieces. It is now on display in the On the Water exhibit at the Smithsonian American History Museum in Washington, DC.

On December 30, 2022, the Ruark was struck and damaged by a car while docked at Tilghman Island.

== See also ==
- List of National Historic Landmarks in Maryland
- National Register of Historic Places listings in Talbot County, Maryland
