= Rosie Parks (skipjack) =

Chesapeake Bay skipjack

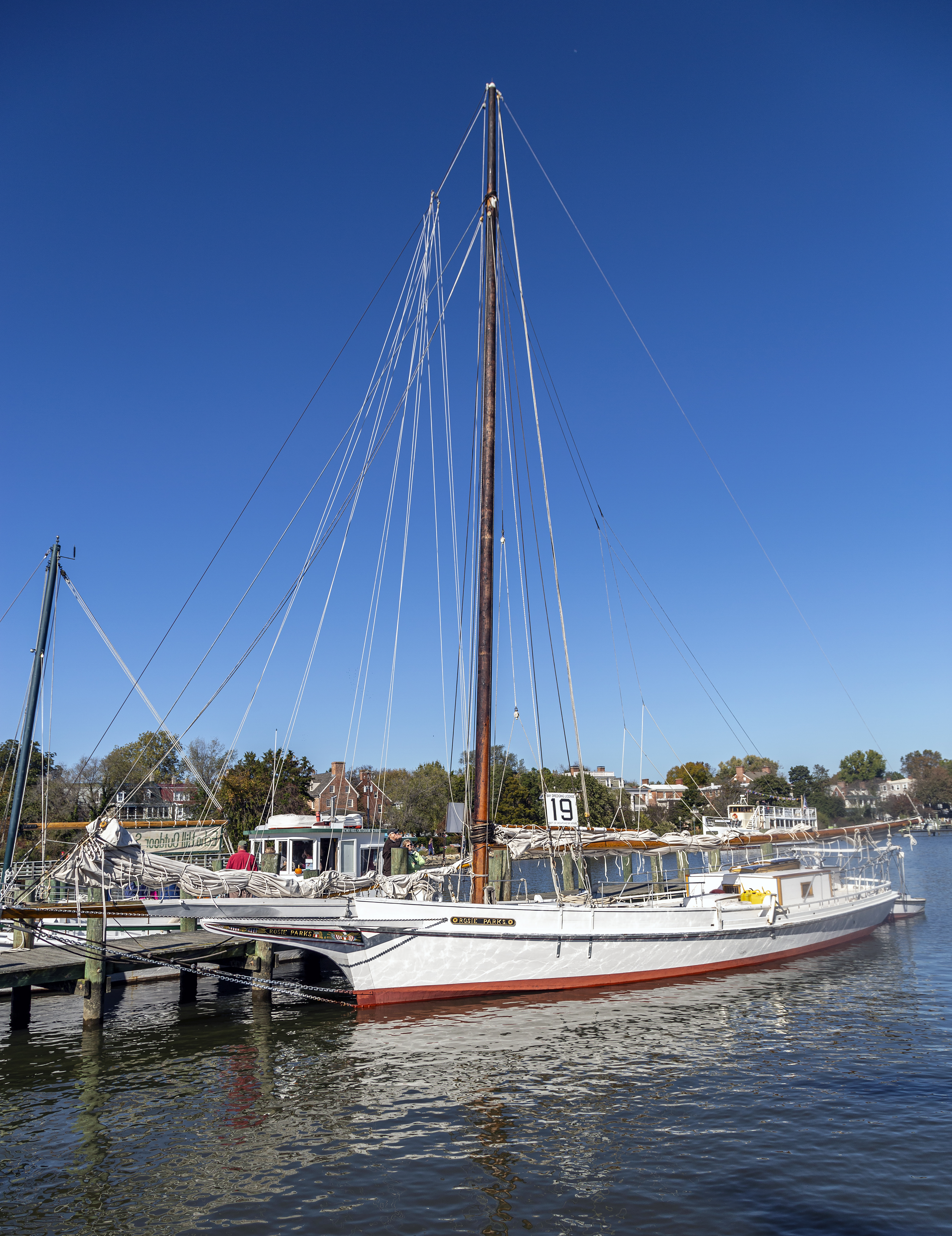
- Rosie Parks at Chestertown, Maryland in 2019

History
- Name: Rosie Parks
- Owner: Chesapeake Bay Maritime Museum
- Builder: Bronza Parks, Wingate, Maryland
- Completed: 1955
- Homeport: Cambridge, Maryland
- Identification: Call sign: WG7023; USCG Doc. No.: 270542
- Status: Operational museum ship

General characteristics
- Type: Chesapeake Bay skipjack
- Tonnage: 8 tons
- Length: 46.2 ft (14.1 m)
- Beam: 16.7 ft (5.1 m)
- Draft: 1.3 ft (0.40 m)
- Sail plan: Sloop

Rosie Parks is a Chesapeake Bay skipjack built in Wingate, Maryland, in 1955 by Bronza Parks. She is owned by the Chesapeake Bay Maritime Museum (CBMM); her hailing port is Cambridge, Maryland. Rosie Parks was purchased by CBMM in 1975 from Orville Parks—the boatbuilder's brother—and she was the first skipjack to be preserved afloat by a museum. On November 2, 2013, Rosie Parks was relaunched after a three-year restoration. She is assigned Maryland dredge number 19.
