= Kathryn (skipjack) =

- U.S. National Register of Historic Places
- U.S. National Historic Landmark
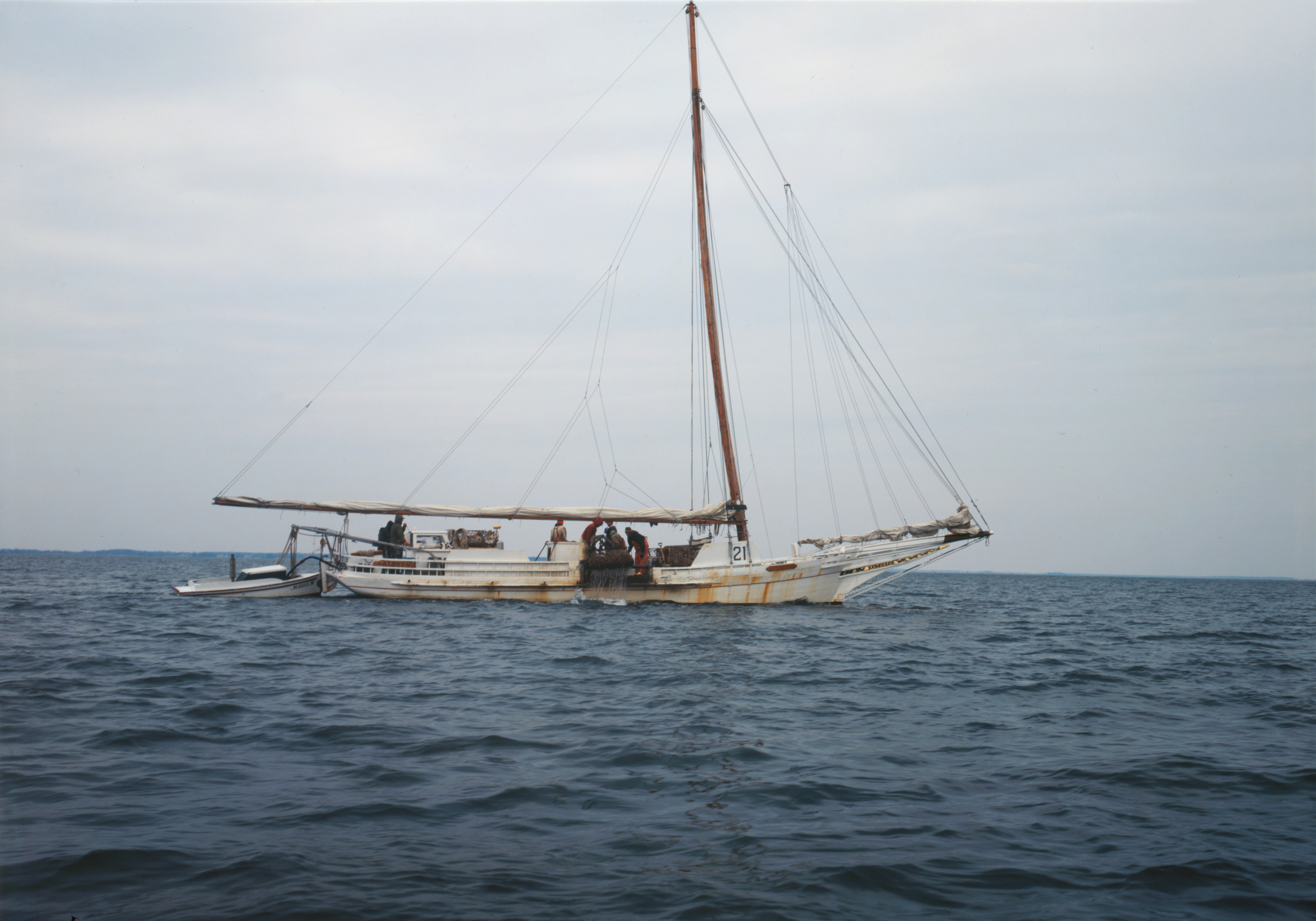
- Kathryn on the Chesapeake Bay ca. 1997

- Location within Maryland Location within the United States
- Location: Tilghman, Maryland
- Coordinates: 38°42′46″N 76°19′53″W
- Built: 1901
- MPS: Chesapeake Bay Skipjack Fleet TR
- NRHP reference No.: 85001090

Significant dates
- Added to NRHP: May 16, 1985
- Designated NHL: April 19, 1994

The Kathryn, a Chesapeake Bay skipjack, was built at Crisfield, Maryland in 1901. Ported at Chance, Maryland, she is reputedly one of the fastest skipjacks on the Bay. She was designated a National Historic Landmark on April 19, 1994. She is one a small number of older skipjacks to survive in working condition.

== Description ==
The Kathryn is 50 feet (15 m) long, 15.67 feet (4.78 m) wide and draws 4.17 feet (1.27 m) of water. She is somewhat unusual in having a "soft" chine rather than a "hard", sharply angled chine. Kathryn otherwise follows the pattern of a Chesapeake Bay skipjack, with a clipper bow-style cutwater, a sharp convex bow, beamy middle, and a flat transom stern. Like all present-day skipjacks she has a stern-mounted push plate to allow operation with a pushboat. She is fore-and-aft-planked, unlike most skipjacks, which are cross-planked. Her flush deck follows the standard skipjack plan, with a main hatch abaft the mast, followed by dredging gear, a smaller hatch, a doghouse over a very low cabin, the steering gear and a set of davits for the pushboat. The cabin is finished with varnished tongue-and-groove paneling, and has a bunk on each side under the deck. Steering gear is hydraulic.

The Kathryn carries the standard skipjack rig with a raked mast, 64 feet (20 m) tall and 12 inches (30 cm) in diameter, carrying a clubbed jib and a jib-headed mainsail. The mainsail is laced to the boom and is carried on wooden hoops on the mast. Unusually, the mast is topped with a gold-leafed wood ball. She has been altered from her original appearance by the features necessary to carry the pushboat. The rear of the cabin has been extended to provide better protection to the helmsman.

She is assigned Maryland dredge number 21.

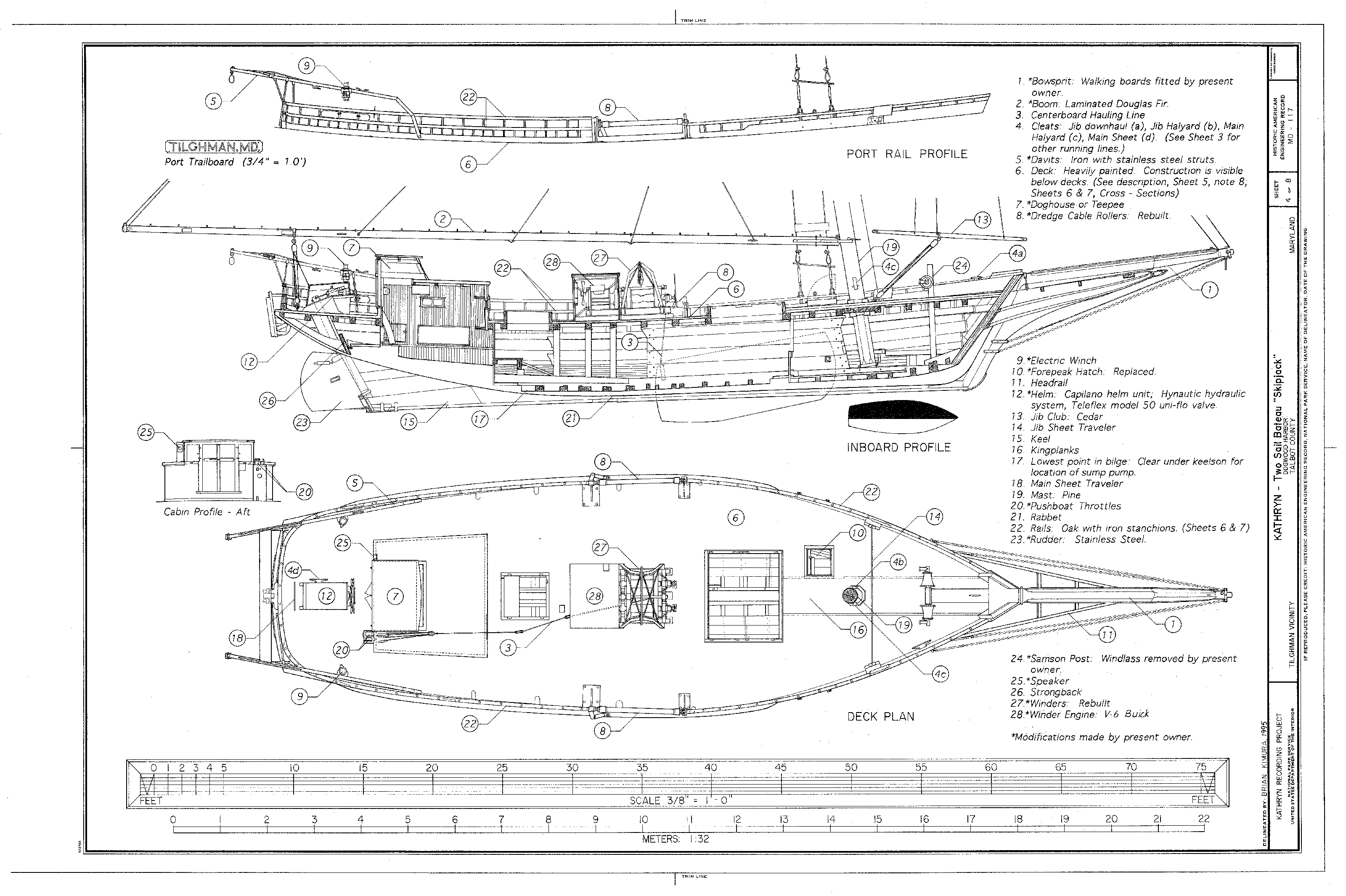
Kathryn, deck plan and section

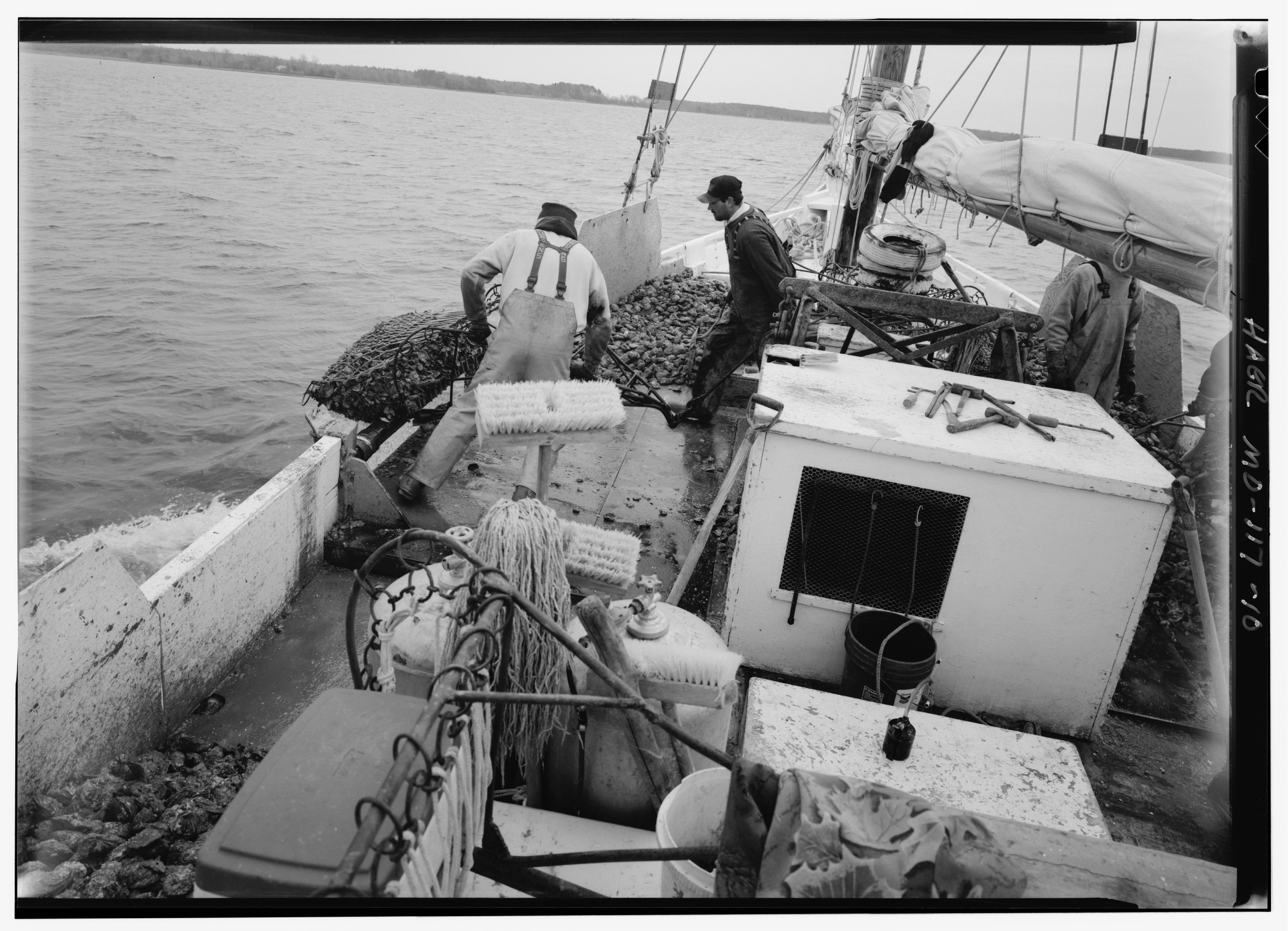
The skipjack Kathryn hauling in oysters

== History ==
Kathryn was built at Crisfield in 1901, using fore-and-aft planking characteristic of early skipjacks, and may have been the first to use the herring-bone technique. Her early history is unknown, as the Reedville, Virginia custom office records were destroyed by fire. She was homeported in Crisfield until 1907, when she was moved to Tappahannock, Virginia. In 1914 she moved to Reedville. In 1925 Kathryn was purchased by John E. Spriggs of Ewell, Maryland and John C. Marshall for $1800 from J.A. Dodson of Fairport, Virginia. Kathryn was moved back to Crisfield at this time. Wells W. Evans bought Kathryn in 1938 for $608, then sold her for "$5.00 etc." in 1945 to Irving F. Cannon, who changed her homeport to Cambridge, Maryland. Malcolm "Mac" Wheatley bought a half interest, again for "$5.00 etc." and served as her captain. She received a major rebuild in 1954 at the Krentz Marine Railway in Harryhogan, Virginia, which was published in Chesapeake Sailing Craft. In 1963 Wheatley became Kathryn's full owner.

Johnnie R. Parkinson Jr. bought Kathryn in 1975 for $18,000 and moved her to Crisfield. She was sold in 1981 to Herman Russell Dize (whose father had worked aboard Kathryn 70 years before) and William James Roe Jr.

Capt. Harold "Stoney" Whitelock of Dames Quarter, Maryland purchased Kathryn in 2008 and is currently working to restore her.

== See also ==
- List of National Historic Landmarks in Maryland
- National Register of Historic Places listings in Talbot County, Maryland
