= Reliance (skipjack) =

- RELIANCE (Chesapeake Bay skipjack)
- U.S. National Register of Historic Places
- Location within Maryland Location within the United States
- Location: Knapps Narrows off MD 33, Tilghman, Maryland
- Coordinates: 38°42′46″N 76°20′7″W
- Area: 0.1 acres (0.040 ha)
- Built: 1904
- NRHP reference No.: 76001013
- Added to NRHP: July 30, 1976

The Reliance is a Chesapeake Bay skipjack, built in 1904 at Fishing Creek, Maryland. She is a 41-foot-long (12 m) two-sail bateau, or "V"-bottomed deadrise type of centerboard sloop. Her beam is 14 feet (4.3 m) and her draft is 2 feet (0.61 m). She one of the 35 surviving traditional Chesapeake Bay skipjacks and a member of the last commercial sailing fleet in the United States. She is located at Tilghman, Talbot County, Maryland.

She was listed on the National Register of Historic Places in 1976.
