= Minnie V (skipjack) =

- MINNIE V
- U.S. National Register of Historic Places
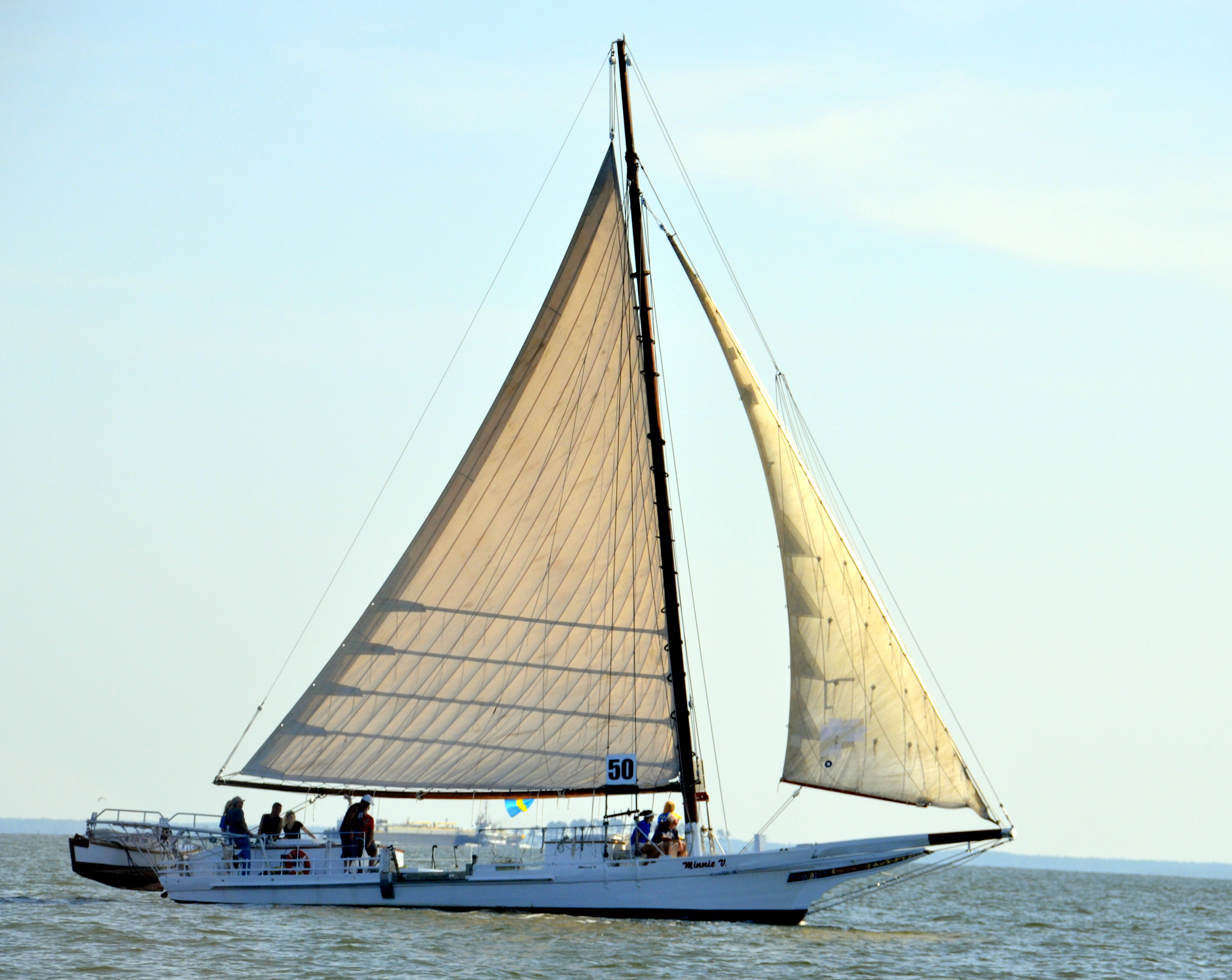

- Location within Maryland Location within the United States
- Location: Gibsontown Rd. Tilghman, Maryland
- Coordinates: 38°42′46″N 76°19′53″W
- Built: 1906
- Architectural style: Skipjack
- MPS: Chesapeake Bay Skipjack Fleet TR
- NRHP reference No.: 85001092
- Added to NRHP: May 16, 1985

The Minnie V is a Chesapeake Bay skipjack, built in 1906 at Wenona, Maryland, United States. It is a 45.3-foot-long, two-sail bateau, or "V"-bottomed deadrise type of centerboard sloop. It has a beam of 15.7 feet and a depth of 3 feet with a net registered tonnage of 8 tons. It is one of the 35 surviving traditional Chesapeake Bay skipjacks and a member of the last commercial sailing fleet in the United States. It is located at Tilghman, Talbot County, Maryland.

The Minnie V is featured as the working skipjack in the television series Homicide: Life on the Street (third-season episode: "The Last of the Watermen").

It was listed on the National Register of Historic Places in 1985. it is assigned Maryland dredge number 50, was previously dredge 33.
