= Martha Lewis (skipjack) =

Chesapeake Bay fishing boat built in 1955

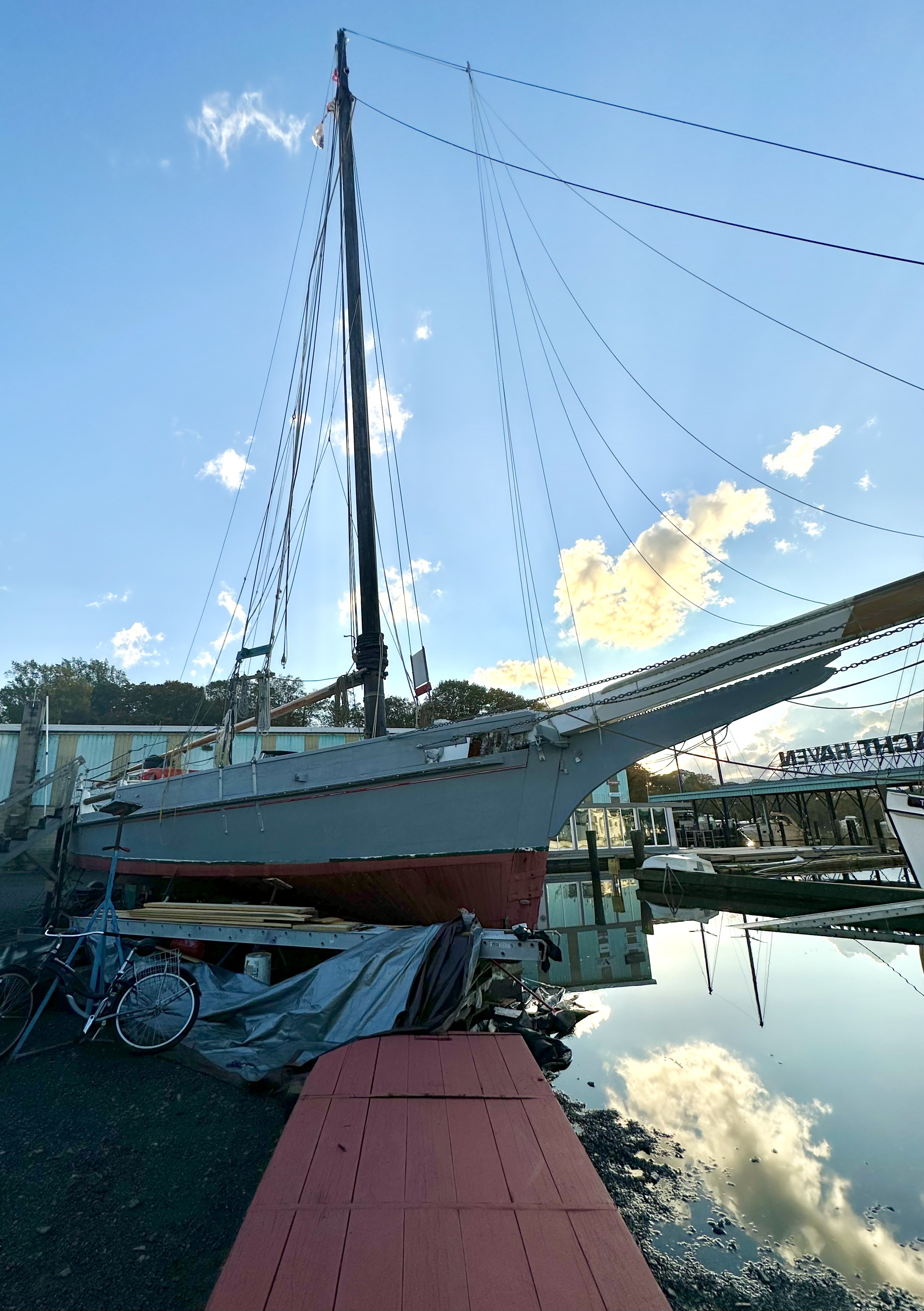

History
- Name: Martha Lewis
- Owner: Chesapeake Heritage Conservancy, Inc.
- Operator: Chesapeake Heritage Conservancy, Inc.
- Builder: Bronza Parks, Wingate, Maryland
- Completed: 1955
- Status: Operational

General characteristics
- Type: Chesapeake Bay skipjack
- Tonnage: 8 tons
- Length: 49 ft 5 in (15.06 m)
- Beam: 16 ft 7 in (5.05 m)
- Draft: 3 ft 8 in (1.12 m)
- Sail plan: Sloop
- Martha Lewis (skipjack)
- U.S. National Register of Historic Places
- Location within Maryland Location within the United States
- Location: Millard Tydings Memorial Park, Commerce St. at S. Strawberry La, Havre de Grace, Maryland
- Coordinates: 39°32′17″N 76°05′30″W
- Architectural style: Chesapeake Bay Skipjack
- MPS: Chesapeake Bay Skipjack Fleet TR
- NRHP reference No.: 08001175
- Added to NRHP: December 11, 2008

Martha Lewis is a Chesapeake Bay skipjack built in 1955. Her home port is Havre de Grace, Harford County, Maryland.

She was listed on the National Register of Historic Places in 2008. She is assigned Maryland dredge number 8.
