= Elsworth (skipjack) =

- ELSWORTH
- U.S. National Register of Historic Places
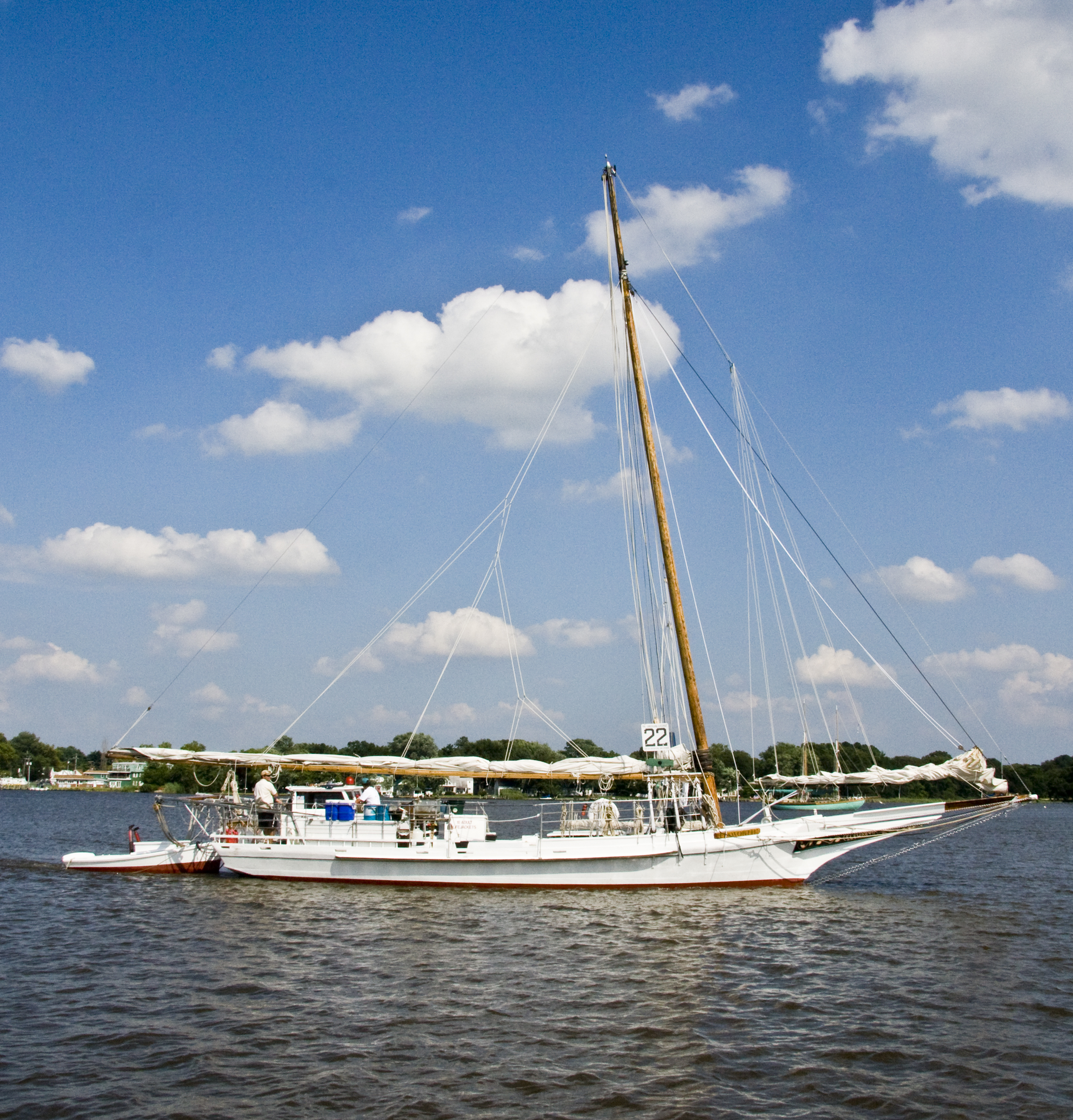

- Location within Maryland Location within the United States
- Location: Gibsontown Rd., Tilghman, Maryland
- Coordinates: 38°42′46″N 76°19′53″W
- Built: 1901
- Architect: Hubbard, Mitchell; Et al.
- Architectural style: Skipjack
- MPS: Chesapeake Bay Skipjack Fleet TR
- NRHP reference No.: 85001088
- Added to NRHP: May 16, 1985

The Elsworth is a Chesapeake Bay skipjack, built in 1901 at Hudson, Maryland. She is a 39.9-foot-long (12.2 m) two-sail bateau, or "V"-bottomed deadrise type of centerboard sloop. She has a beam of 14.3', a depth of 3.1', and a gross registered tonnage of 8 tons. She is one of the 35 surviving traditional Chesapeake Bay skipjacks and a member of the last commercial sailing fleet in the United States.

She is owned by the Echo Hill Outdoor School and used for educational excursions on the Chester River and Chesapeake Bay. The Echo Hill School acquired the Elsworth in 1988 and rebuilt her starting in 1996. The Elsworth is kept at the public pier in Chestertown, Maryland alongside the Schooner Sultana.

She was listed on the National Register of Historic Places in 1985. She is assigned Maryland dredge number 22.
