= Sigsbee (skipjack) =

- U.S. National Register of Historic Places
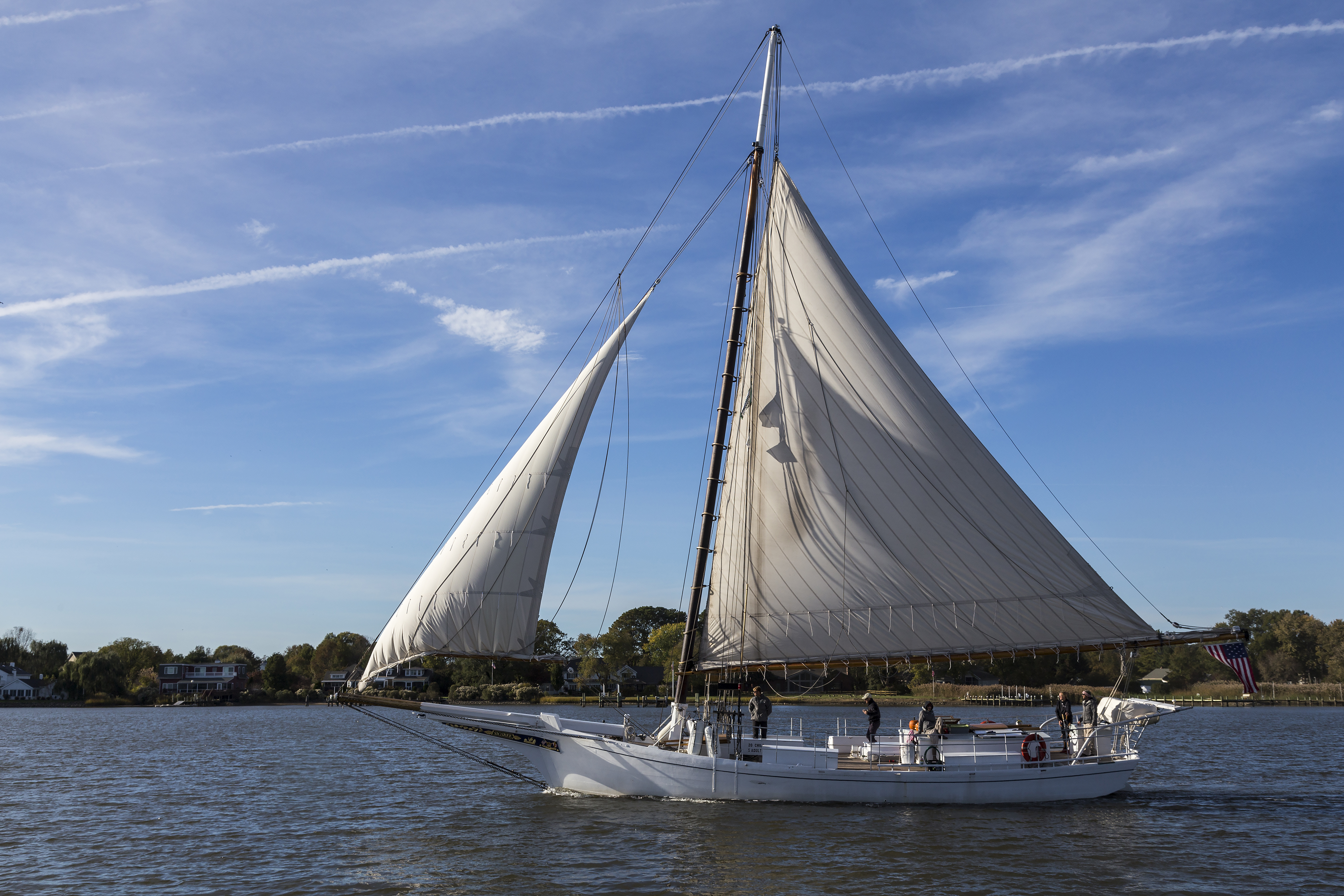
- Sigsbee under sail on the Chester River in 2016

- Location within Maryland Location within the United States
- Location: Knapps Narrows, Tilghman, Maryland
- Coordinates: 38°43′9″N 76°20′2″W
- Built: 1901
- Architectural style: Skipjack
- MPS: Chesapeake Bay Skipjack Fleet TR
- NRHP reference No.: 85001097
- Added to NRHP: May 16, 1985

The Sigsbee is a Chesapeake Bay skipjack, built in 1901 at Deal Island, Maryland, United States. She is a 47-foot-long (14 m) two-sail bateau, or "V"-bottomed deadrise type of centerboard sloop. She has a beam of 15.8 feet (4.8 m), a depth of 3.8 feet (1.2 m), and a gross registered tonnage of 8 tons. She is one of the 35 surviving traditional Chesapeake Bay skipjacks and a member of the last commercial sailing fleet in the United States. She is owned and operated by the Living Classrooms Foundation in Baltimore, Maryland.

She was listed on the National Register of Historic Places in 1985. She is assigned Maryland dredge number 5.
