= E.C. Collier (skipjack) =

Boat built in 1910 at Deal Island, Maryland, US

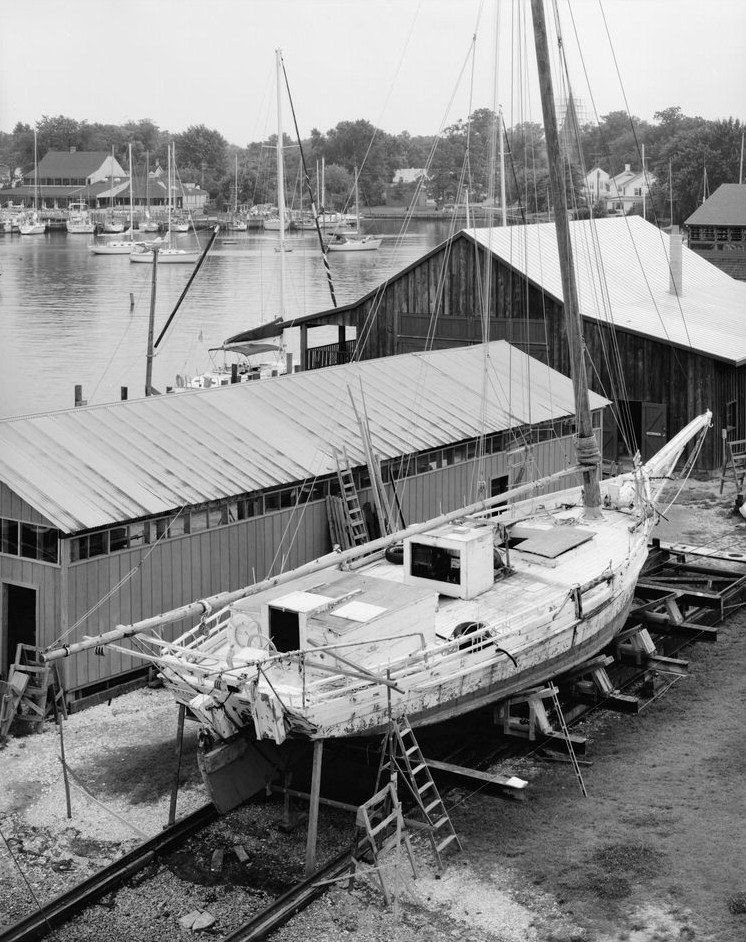

History

United States
- Launched: 1910

General characteristics
- Tonnage: 14 NRT
- Length: 52 ft (16 m)
- Beam: 17.9 ft (5.5 m)
- Depth of hold: 4.5 ft (1.4 m)
- E.C. Collier
- U.S. National Register of Historic Places
- Location within Maryland
- Location: Gibsontown Rd., Tilghman, Maryland
- Coordinates: 38°42′46″N 76°19′53″W
- Built: 1910
- Architectural style: Skipjack
- MPS: Chesapeake Bay Skipjack Fleet TR
- NRHP reference No.: 85001087
- Added to NRHP: 16 May 1985

E.C. Collier is a Chesapeake Bay skipjack, built in 1910 at Deal Island, Maryland. She is a 52-foot-long (16 m) two-sail bateau, or "V"-bottomed deadrise type of centerboard sloop. She has a beam of 17.9 feet (5.5 m), a depth of 4.5 feet (1.4 m), and a registered net tonnage of 14 tons. She is one of the 35 surviving traditional Chesapeake Bay skipjacks and a member of the last commercial sailing fleet in the United States. At the time of her documentation on the National Register of Historic Places she was located at Tilghman, Talbot County, Maryland. She is now a permanent exhibit at the Chesapeake Bay Maritime Museum in Saint Michaels, Maryland.

She was listed on the National Register of Historic Places in 1985. She is assigned Maryland dredge number 7.
