= Virginia W =

- U.S. National Register of Historic Places
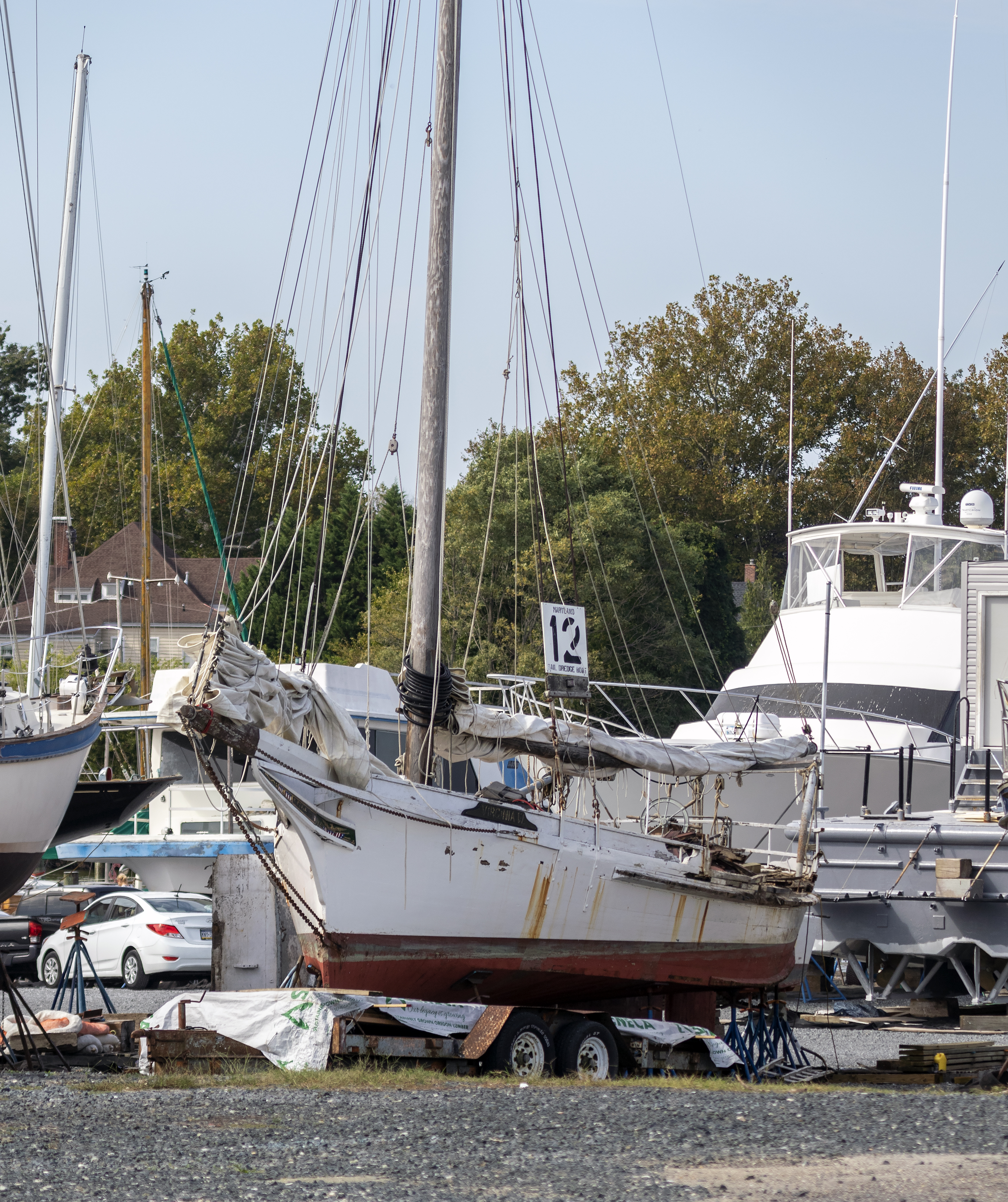
- The Virginia W hauled out of the water in Cambridge, Maryland in 2021

- Location within Maryland Location within the United States
- Location: Cambridge, Maryland
- Coordinates: 38°43′9″N 76°20′2″W
- Built: 1904
- Architect: Lewis, Harrison
- Architectural style: Skipjack
- MPS: Chesapeake Bay Skipjack Fleet TR
- NRHP reference No.: 85001098
- Added to NRHP: May 16, 1985

The Virginia W is a Chesapeake Bay skipjack, built in 1904 at Guilford, Virginia. She is a 37.5-foot-long (11.4 m) two-sail bateau, or "V"-bottomed deadrise type of centerboard sloop. Her beam is 13.5 feet (4.1 m), and she draws 3.3 feet (1.0 m) with centerboard up, 6 feet (1.8 m) with centerboard down. She is one of the 35 surviving traditional Chesapeake Bay skipjacks and a member of the last commercial sailing fleet in the United States. She is located at Cambridge, Maryland, Dorchester County.

She was listed on the National Register of Historic Places in 1985. She is assigned Maryland dredge number 12.
