= Mearsville, Virginia =

Unincorporated community in Virginia, United States

Coordinates: 37°51′33″N 75°37′26″W

Mearsville is an unincorporated community in Accomack County, Virginia, United States.
