= Flora A. Price (skipjack) =

Flora A. Price was a skipjack that was listed on Preservation Maryland's 2008 list of most endangered historic sites.

== History ==
She was built in 1910 in Somerset County, Maryland by Sylvester Muir. According to Preservation Maryland:

The Skipjack Flora A. Price is a treasure of Maryland's nautical traditions. The ship is the largest remaining skipjack and was part of the last working commercial fleet in the country.

The Flora A. Price is in need of repairs to withstand damage from the wind and water. There was a commitment to repair the ship before the ship falls victim to the elements.

The ship was located in Cambridge, Dorchester County. The ship was donated to a Dorchester County Maritime Museum in Cambridge, Maryland with the intent that she would be preserved, however the boat sunk in the Cambridge, Maryland harbor while anchored and was left for about two years to rot. She was removed by an excavator and put on shore in a heap and burned in 2013.
