= Margaret Lee =

Margaret Lee may refer to:

- Margaret Lee (lady-in-waiting) (c.1506–c.1543), Thomas Wyatt's sister; Anne Boleyn's lady-in-waiting, friend and cousin
- Margaret Lee (Hong Kong actress) (born 1962), Hong Kong actress, see Hong Kong Film Award for Best Supporting Actress
- Margaret Lee (Singaporean actress) (born 1970), Singaporean actress
- Margaret Lee (English actress) (1943–2024), British actress who starred in Italian films
- Margaret Lee (tennis), in 1961 to 1968 Wimbledon Championships – Women's Singles
