= Maggie Lee (skipjack) =

- MAGGIE LEE
- U.S. National Register of Historic Places
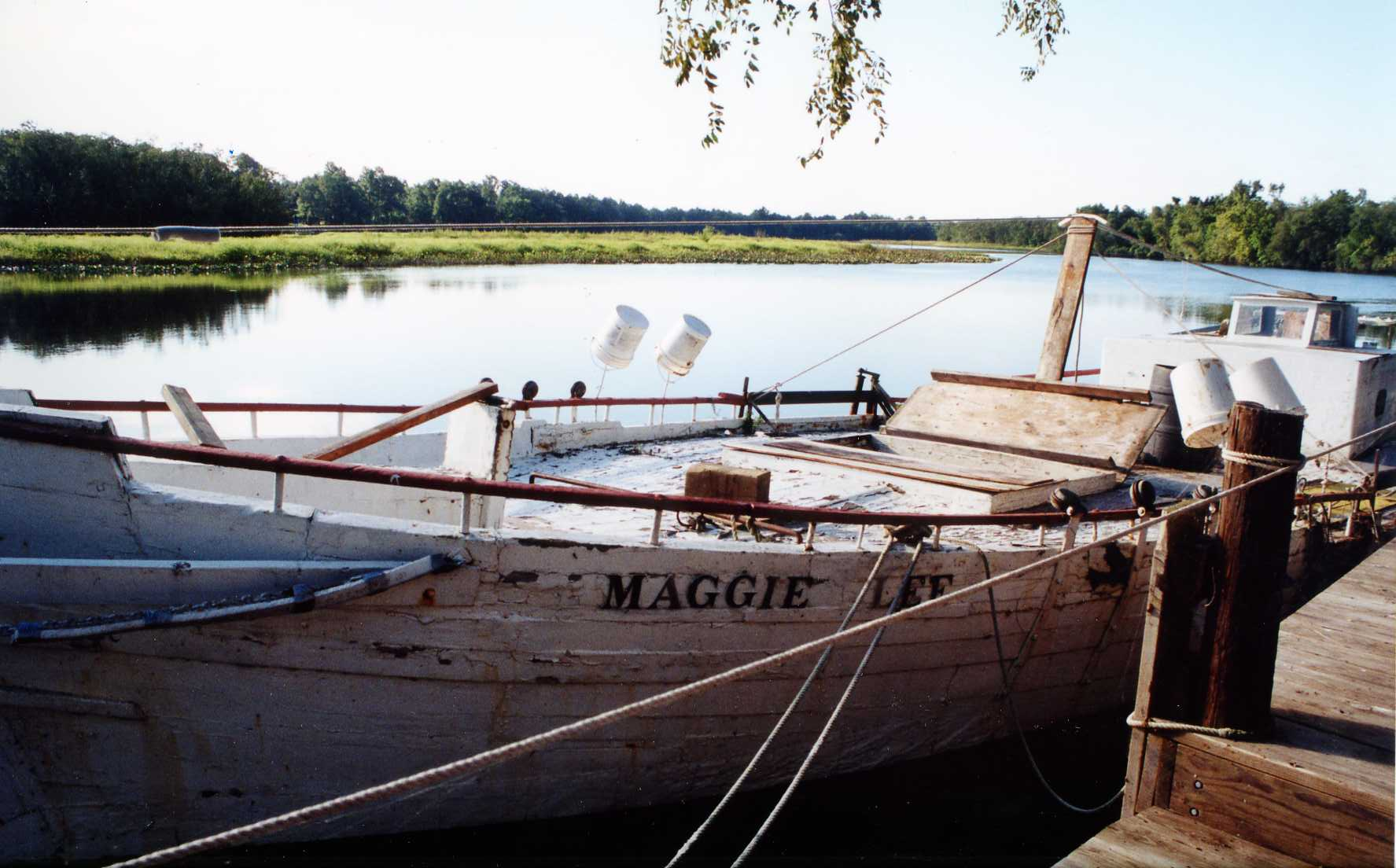
- The Maggie Lee awaits restoration

- Location within Maryland Location within the United States
- Location: Gibsontown Rd., Tilghman, Maryland
- Coordinates: 38°42′46″N 76°19′53″W
- Built: 1903
- Architectural style: Skipjack
- MPS: Chesapeake Bay Skipjack Fleet TR
- NRHP reference No.: 85001091
- Added to NRHP: May 16, 1985

The Maggie Lee is a Chesapeake Bay skipjack, built in 1903 at Pocomoke City, Maryland. She is a 51' long two-sail bateau, or "V"-bottomed deadrise type of centerboard sloop. She has a beam of 16', a depth of 3.8', and a net tonnage of 8 register tons. She is one of the 35 surviving traditional Chesapeake Bay skipjacks and a member of the last commercial sailing fleet in the United States. She is located at Denton, Caroline County, Maryland.

She was listed on the National Register of Historic Places in 1985. She is assigned Maryland dredge number 9.
