= Harryhogan, Virginia =

Unincorporated community in Virginia, US

Coordinates: 38°00′25″N 76°32′39″W

Harryhogan is an unincorporated community in Northumberland County, in the U.S. state of Virginia.
