= Skipjack (boat) =

Sailboat type used on Chesapeake Bay for oyster dredging

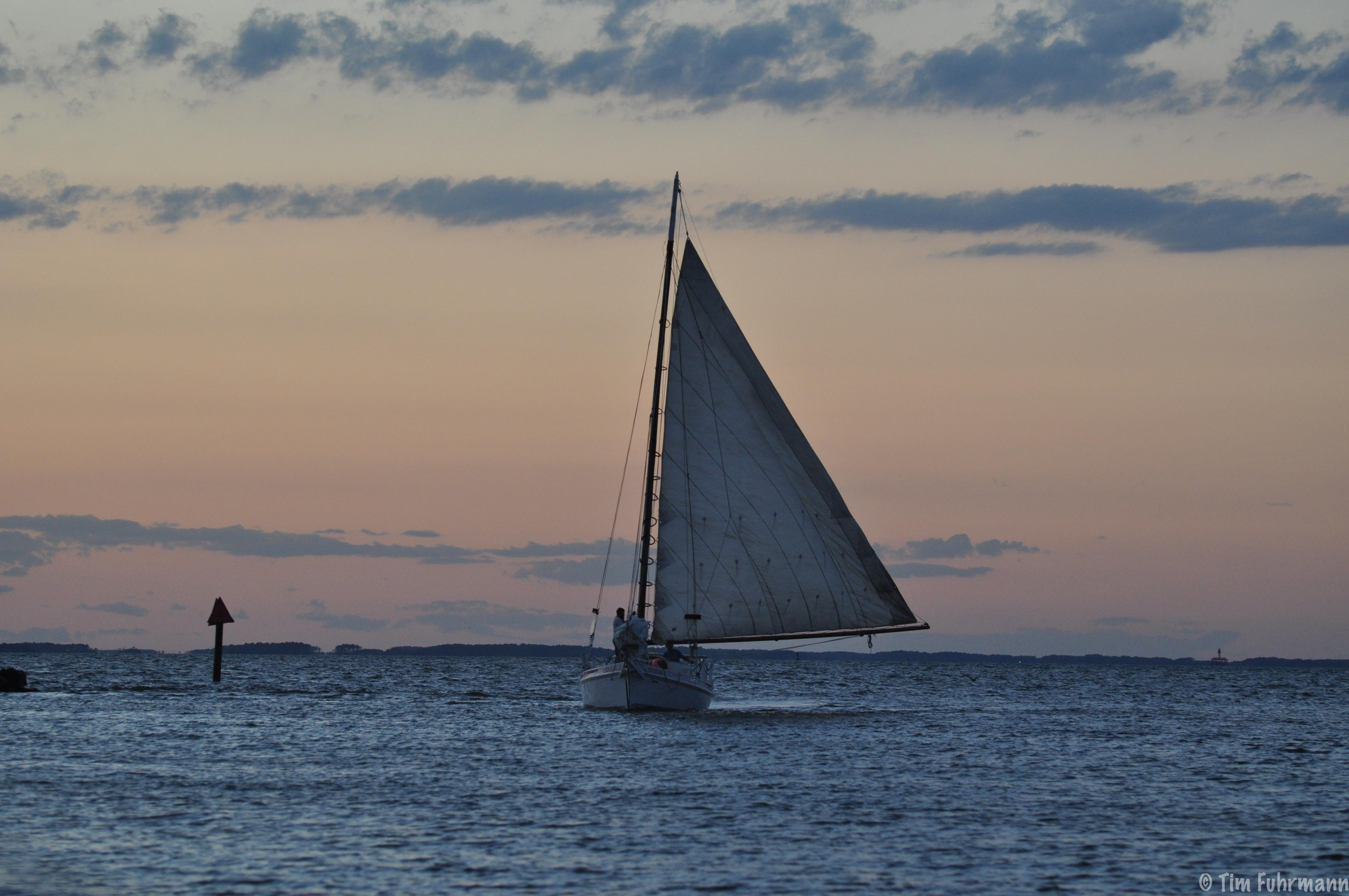

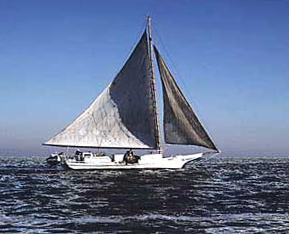
Skipjack under sail

The skipjack is a traditional fishing boat used on the Chesapeake Bay for oyster dredging. It is a sailboat which succeeded the bugeye as the chief oystering boat on the bay, and it remains in service due to laws restricting the use of powerboats in the Maryland state oyster fishery.

== Design and construction ==
The skipjack is sloop-rigged, with a sharply raked mast and extremely long boom (typically the same length as the deck of the boat). The mainsail is ordinarily triangular, though gaff rigged examples were built. The jib is self-tending and mounted on a bowsprit. This sail plan affords the power needed to pull the dredge, particularly in light winds, while at the same time minimizing the crew required to handle the boat.

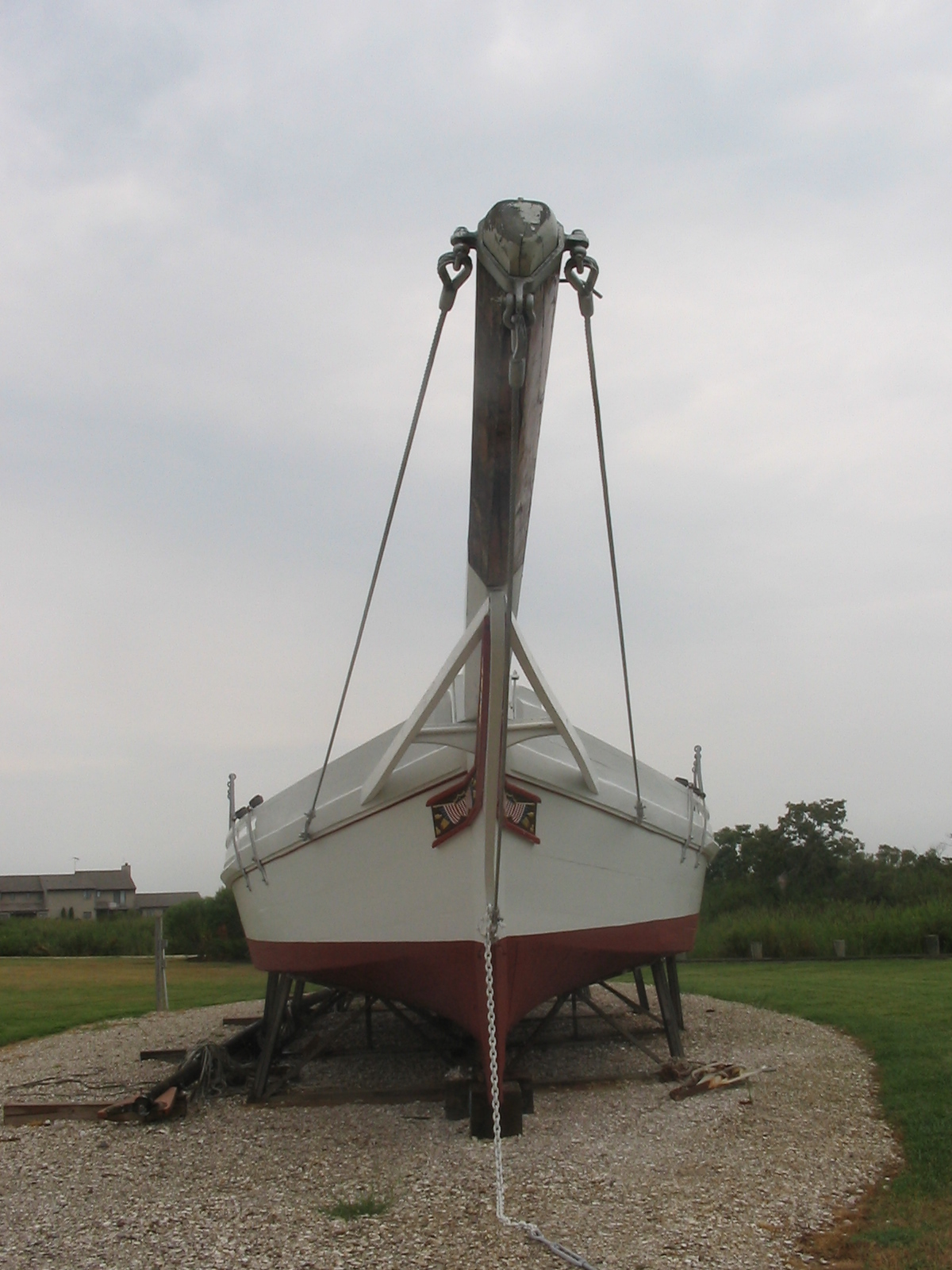
Skipjack as seen from the bow (front)

The hull is wooden and V-shaped, with a hard chine and a square stern. In order to provide a stable platform when dredging, skipjacks have very low freeboard and a wide beam (averaging one third the length on deck). A centerboard is mounted in lieu of a keel. The mast is hewn from a single log, with two stays on either side, without spreaders; it is stepped towards the bow of the boat, with a small cabin. As typical in regional practice the bow features a curving longhead under the bowsprit, with carved and painted trailboards. A small figurehead is common. A typical skipjack is 40 to 50 feet in length. The boats use direct link Edson worm steering gear mounted immediately forward of the transom.

The dredge windlass and its motor are mounted amidships, between the mast and deckhouse. Rollers and bumpers are mounted on either side of the boat to guide the dredge line and protect the hull.

Due to state laws, the boat has no motor (other than for the windlass). Most skipjacks were eventually modified with stern davits to hold a dinghy or pushboat to allow motorized travel as permitted by law.

== History ==
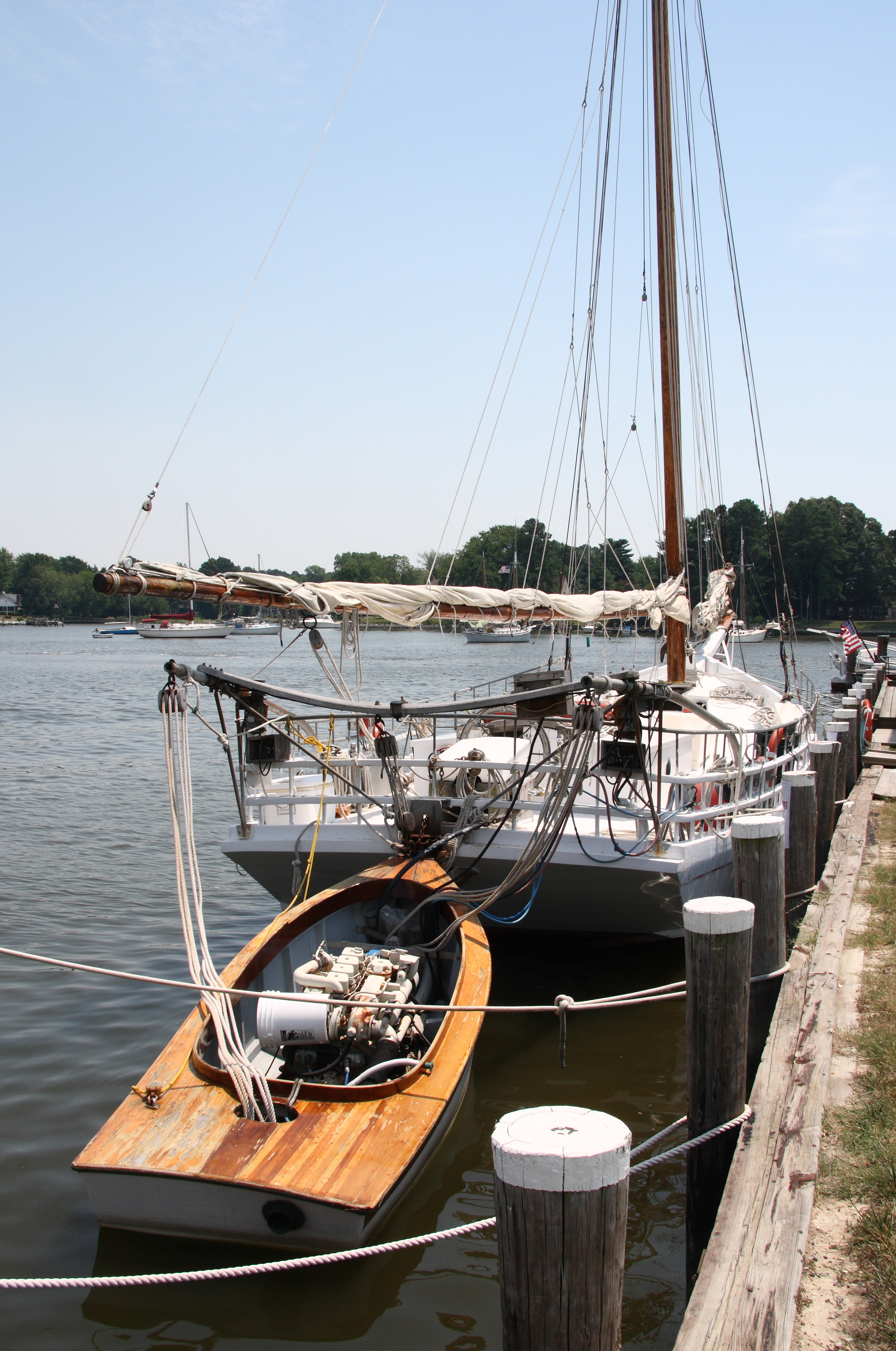
Skipjack H.M. Krentz and pushboat

The skipjack arose near the end of the 19th century. Dredging for oysters, prohibited in 1820, was again made legal in 1865. Boats of the time were unsuitable, and the bugeye developed out of the log canoe in order to provide a boat with more power adapted to the shallow waters of the oyster beds.

The bugeye was originally constructed with a log hull, and as the supply of appropriate timber was exhausted and construction costs rose, builders looked to other designs. They adapted the sharpies of Long Island Sound by increasing the beam and simplifying the sail plan. The result was cheaper and simpler to construct than the bugeye, and it quickly became the predominant oystering boat in the bay.

Debate remains to this day about the origins of the name. Some speculate it came from a name New England fisherman called the flying fish, bonita. Still others claim it is derived from an archaic English term, meaning an "inexpensive yet useful servant."

Maryland's oyster harvest reached an all-time peak in 1884, at approximately 15 million bushels of oysters. The oyster harvest has since declined steadily, especially at the end of the 20th century. The size of the fleet has likewise declined. New skipjacks were built as late as 1993, but a change in the law in 1965 allowed the use of motor power two days of the week. As a result, few of the boats are operated under sail in commercial use; instead, a pushboat is used to move the skipjack, and little dredging is done except on the days that power is allowed.

At one time, the number of skipjacks produced is estimated at approximately 2,000; today, they number about 40, with fewer than half of them in active fishing. The future of the fleet remains in doubt as efforts continue to restore the productivity of the oyster beds.

The skipjack was designated the state boat of Maryland in 1985.

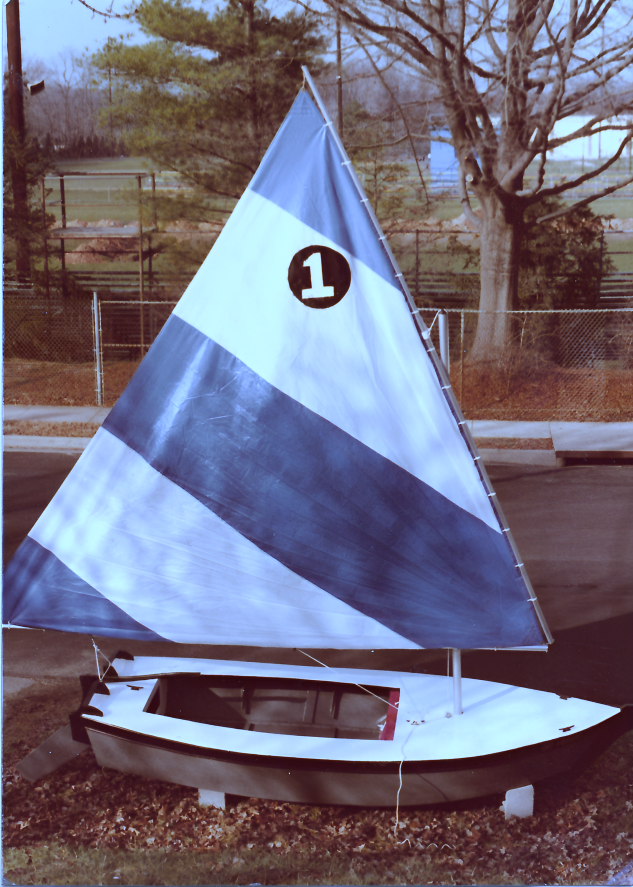
A small skipjack style boat built to Peter Stevenson's 1977 plans, shown with a modified "sunfish" sail.

The popularity of the skipjack in the late 1970s is seen in Peter Stevenson's 1977 book, "Sailboats You Can Build," which featured plans for a home-built skipjack as well as 2 other small day-sailing boats.

Joshua Slocum piloted a modified Skipjack, a gaff rigged sloop named Spray in the first solo global circumnavigation. He wrote about the experience in his classic Sailing Alone Around the World. The rigging was modified to a yawl near the Strait of Magellan.

== Remaining skipjacks ==
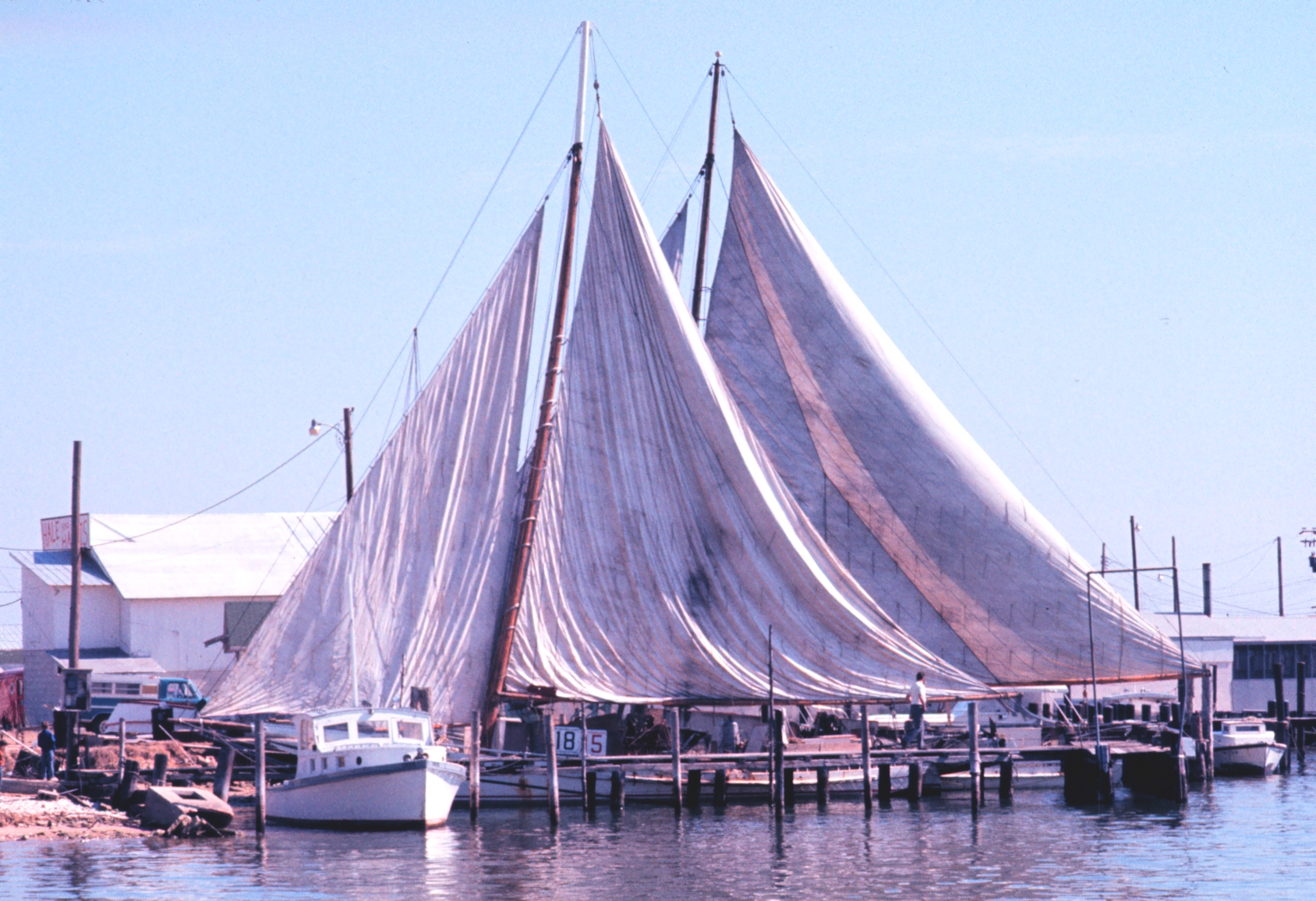
Chesapeake Bay skipjacks drying sails while in port

1. Ada Mae, New Bern, North Carolina. Built in Rose Bay, North Carolina in 1915.
2. Anna McGarvey, Cambridge, Maryland. Built in Baltimore in 1981. Now Han Em Harve. Dredge # 62.
3. Barbara Batchelder, Rock Hall, Maryland. Built in Rock Hall, 1956, as a recreational vessel for Irénée du Pont, Jr.
4. Caleb W. Jones, Cobb Island, Maryland. Built in 1953 in Reedville, Virginia. Dredge #51.
5. City of Crisfield, Deal Island, Maryland. Built in Reedville, Virginia in 1949. Dredge #44.
6. Clarence Crockett, Deal Island, Maryland. Built in Deep Creek, Virginia in 1908.
7. Claude W. Somers, Reedville, VA. Built in Young's Creek, VA in 1911, now a sailing museum boat at the Reedville Fishermen's Museum. Dredge #55.
8. Curlew III, Deal Island, Maryland. Built in Cambridge, Maryland in 1964 as a recreational boat, converted to a dredge boat.
9. Dee of St. Mary's, Solomons, Maryland. Built in Piney Point, Maryland in 1979, now a sailing museum boat that the Calvert Marine Museum. Dredge #16.
10. E.C. Collier, St. Michaels, MD. Built in Deal Island in 1910.(Currently an onshore display at the Chesapeake Bay Maritime Museum). Dredge #7.
11. Elsie Peggy Joyce, Madison, Maryland. Built 1970, converted from a recreational boat to a dredge boat. Dredge # 91.
12. Elsworth, Chestertown, Maryland. Built in 1901 in Hudson, Maryland, operated by the Echo Hill Outdoor School as a sailing classroom boat. Dredge #22.
13. Faith, Talbot County, Maryland. Built in Oxford, Maryland in 1968. Formerly Ada Fears, operated as a dredge boat. Dredge #17.
14. Fannie L. Daugherty, Deal Island, MD. Built in Crisfield, Maryland in 1904. Dredge #58 (previously 2).
15. F. C. Lewis, Jr, Cambridge, Maryland, built 1907 in Hopkins, Virginia. Dredge #36.
16. Fortune, Cambridge, Maryland. Built in Little Ferry, New Jersey in 1978. Operated as a dredge boat. Dredge #95.
17. George W. Collier, built in Deal Island, Maryland, 1900, was Allegheny and Norfolk, being restored in Deal Island, Maryland.
18. Helen Virginia, Deal Island, Maryland. Built in 1948 in Crisfield, Maryland. Dredge #53.
19. Hilda M. Willing, Tilghman Island, Maryland. Built in Oriole, Maryland in 1905. Dredge #11.
20. H.M. Krentz, Saint Michaels, MD. Built in Harryhogan, Virginia in 1955. Dredge # 59 (previously 23).
21. Ida May, Deal Island, MD. Built in Deep Creek, Virginia in 1906. Dredge #41.
22. Joy Parks, St. Mary's County, Piney Point Lighthouse Museum. Built in Parksley, Virginia in 1936.
23. Kathryn, Deal Island, Maryland. Built in Crisfield, Maryland in 1901. Dredge #21.
24. Lady Helen, Kent Island, Maryland. Built in Pasadena, Maryland in 1987 as a recreational vessel.
25. Lady Katie, Cambridge, MD. Built in Wingate, Maryland in 1956. Dredge #25.
26. Maggie Lee, West Denton, MD. Built in Pocomoke City, Maryland in 1908. Dredge #9.
27. Mamie A. Mister, Deal, MD. Built in Champ, Maryland in 1911. Dismantled for storage in Deal Island, in poor condition.
28. Martha Lewis, Havre de Grace, MD. Built in Wingate, Maryland in 1955. Operated by the Chesapeake Heritage Conservancy. Dredge #8.
29. Mary W. Somers, St. Mary's City, MD. Built in Mearsville, Virginia in 1904.
30. Minnie V, Deal Island, Maryland. Built in Wenonah, Maryland in 1906. Formerly operated by the Living Classrooms Foundation, returned to work as a dredge boat. Dredge #50 (previously 33).
31. Miss Victoria, built in Deltaville, Va 1977, not part of the original oyster fleet.
32. Modern Day, built in Madison, Maryland, 2015, not part of the original oyster fleet. Dredge #94.
33. Nathan of Dorchester,, Cambridge, MD. Built Cambridge, Maryland. Commissioned in 1994.
34. Nellie L. Byrd, Middle River, Maryland. Built in Oriole, Maryland in 1911. Dredge #28.
35. Oyster Catcher, formerly Connie Francis, Piney Point, Maryland. Built in 1984, Gloucester Point, Va, no longer skipjack rigged. Dredge # 63.
36. Rebecca T. Ruark, Tilghman Island, MD. Built in Taylors Island, Maryland in 1886. Dredge #29.
37. Reliance. Built at Fishing Creek, Maryland in 1904. present location not known. Dredge #4.
38. Ringgold Bros, Norwalk, Connecticut. Built in Oriole, Maryland, 1911, no longer skipjack rigged. Working clam dredge. Dredge #32.
39. Rosie Parks, St. Michaels, Maryland. Built in Wingate, Maryland in 1955. Operated by the Chesapeake Bay Maritime Museum. Dredge #19.
40. Sigsbee, Baltimore, Maryland. Built in Oriole, Maryland 1901, now operated as a classroom boat by the Living Classroom Foundation. Dredge #5.
41. Somerset, Wenona, Maryland. Built in Reedsville, Virginia in 1949, working dredge boat. Dredge #33 (previously 35).
42. Stanley Norman, Annapolis, Maryland. Built in 1902, Salisbury, Maryland. Operated by the Chesapeake Bay Foundation for educational programs. Dredge #60 (previously 20).
43. Talbot Lady, Canton, New Jersey. Built at Skipton Creek, Maryland, 1984. Private pleasure boat.
44. Thomas W. Clyde, Tilghman Island, Maryland. Built in Oriole, Maryland in 1911. Working dredge boat. Dredge #39.
45. Virginia W, Cambridge, Maryland. Built in Guilford, Virginia in 1904. Working dredge boat. Dredge #12.
46. Wilma Lee, Annapolis, Maryland. Built in Wingate, Maryland in 1940. Operated by Annapolis Maritime Museum & Park, arriving June 20, 2018 from Ocracoke, North Carolina. Dredge #24.

=== Documented destroyed and wrecked skipjacks ===
1. Esther F. Built in Fairmount, Maryland in 1954. Sunk at moorings in Wittman, Maryland, broken up in 2009, formerly on the National Register of Historic Places. Dredge #2.
2. Ethel Lewis Built in Onancock, Virginia in 1906. Burned in 2010 after it was determined to be beyond repair.
3. Flora A. Price. Built in Champ, Maryland in 1910. Sunk at moorings in Cambridge, raised and burned 2013.
4. Lorraine Rose, remains are in Knapps Narrows, Tilghman Island. Built 1949 in Reedville, Virginia.
5. Maggie Lee, remains are in West Denton, Maryland on the Choptank River. Built 1903 in Pocomoke, Maryland. Dredge #9.
6. Ralph T. Webster, remains are in Knapps Narrows, Tilghman Island, Maryland., next to Lorraine Rose. Built in Oriole, Maryland in 1905. Dredge #3.
