= Bessie Jones (schooner) =

Patrol vessel of the United States Navy

History

United States
- Name: Bessie Jones
- Owner: Maryland Conservation Commission
- Operator: State Oyster Police; State Fishery Force
- Builder: Joseph W. Brooks, Little Choptank River, Maryland
- Completed: 1892
- Fate: Sold 1918 by Maryland Conservation Commission for $1,750
- Notes: Assigned SP-1476 identification during WW I.

General characteristics
- Type: Patrol vessel
- Length: 62 ft (19 m)
- Beam: 20 ft 0 in (6.10 m)
- Draft: 6 ft (1.8 m)
- Complement: 9
- Armament: Six pounder gun (Oyster Police Force)

Bessie Jones was a Maryland State Oyster Police Force (“Oyster Navy”) schooner, part of the force established to enforce state conservation laws designed to protect Maryland's oyster resources when out-of-state, often New England, dredgers began destroying reefs in the Chesapeake Bay. Later local opposition to licenses turned to open "warfare" in the "oyster wars" when a fleet of state vessels fought "oyster pirates" in armed conflicts. Bessie Jones was assigned to St. Mary's County, Maryland in 1902 and later to the Hill's Point, Maryland areas.

That force became the Maryland State Fishery Force under the Conservation Commission of Maryland with which the schooner served when the entire force, boats and men, became a part of the U.S. Naval Reserve in an agreement between the state and the Navy in 1917. The force was one of the elements forming today's Maryland Department of Natural Resources Police.

In January 1893 new Driggs-Schroeder guns for the Oyster Navy had arrived and were to be installed on the schooners May Brown, Anna B. Smith, and Bessie Jones. (Note: References for Julia Hamilton specifically mention a six pounder gun which is one of the types made by Driggs-Schroeder.) The oyster wars continued with one account involving Bessie Jones in 1906 resulting in the Captain, Douglas Russel killing one of the oyster pirates. Russel had been warned by a dredger named Harris that the law was not going to keep him from dredging the Cobb Island beds. Russel warned the dredger "The law and my 45-70 rifle can do just that." The dredger was caught by Russel illegally night dredging, and Russel began firing into the dredger's rigging to disable it for arrest. Harris fired back and Russel fired back killing Harris.

The Navy approached the Conservation Commission shortly after the nation entered into World War I proposing the commission's boats be used to maintain constant local patrols. The state legislature agreed that the boats and men of the state force would become part of the U.S. Naval Reserve providing they patrol the same districts for fisheries enforcement as well as federal interests with the benefit that patrol time would be increased and the expense for all be paid by the federal government. The Maryland State Fishery Force boats began operating under a contract in which they were under a free lease to the United States Navy in August 1917, serving as Squadron Number 8 of the 5th Naval District, patrolling their regular areas and enforcing state conservation law and federal laws. They were under the command of a Conservation Commission member who was also a Lieutenant in the Navy with all expenses, wages, supplies, and repairs paid by the federal government.

During the wartime dual service the schooner was given the identification number SP-1476. There is no indication of the vessel being commissioned. The schooner served until returned to normal Conservation Commission duty on 27 November 1918. Bessie Jones continued to patrol the usual waters enforcing conservation law as well as federal law under the agreement.

The commission began replacing its older sailing vessels with new power boats in 1918. Two new boats, Kent and Talbot were acquired with Severn being purchased. The schooners Bessie Jones, Helen Baughman, Julia Hamilton, and Anna B. Smith were retired and sold along with the motorized, converted schooner, Daisy Archer. Bessie Jones was sold for $1,750.00.

== Other Maryland Fishery Force vessels ==
Bessie Jones, Buck, Daisy Archer, Dorothy, Frolic, Governor R. M. McLane, Julia Hamilton, Helen Baughman, Murray, Music, Nellie Jackson, Nettie, Severn, St. Mary's, and Swan
