= USS Frolic (SP-1336) =

Patrol vessel of the United States Navy

History

United States
- Name: Frolic
- Namesake: Previous name retained
- Owner: Maryland Conservation Commission
- Operator: State Oyster Police; State Fishery Force
- Completed: 1884
- Fate: Sold 1918 by Maryland Conservation Commission for $800

General characteristics
- Type: Schooner
- Length: 62 ft (19 m)
- Beam: 18 ft 6 in (5.64 m)
- Draft: 5 ft 10 in (1.78 m)
- Complement: 7

Frolic was a Maryland State Oyster Police Force (“Oyster Navy”) schooner, part of the force established to enforce state conservation laws designed to protect Maryland's oyster resources when out of state, often New England, dredgers began destroying reefs in the Chesapeake Bay. Later local opposition to licenses turned to open "warfare" in the "oyster wars" when a fleet of state vessels fought "oyster pirates" in armed conflicts. Frolic was built in 1884. The schooner was assigned to Queen Anne's County, Maryland in 1902 and later to the commission's Second District which included Eastern Bay, and the Miles and Wye Rivers.

That force became the Maryland State Fishery Force under the Conservation Commission of Maryland with which the schooner served when the entire force, boats and men, became a part of the U.S. Naval Reserve in an agreement between the state and the Navy in 1917. The force was one of the elements forming today's Maryland Department of Natural Resources Police.

During an extreme cold period in January 1893, with Annapolis iced in and ice extending across the upper Chesapeake, many of the force's schooners were frozen in ice. The force's steamers, Governor R. M. McLane and Governor P. F. Thomas, along with tugs broke ice keeping a narrow channel in Annapolis clear and then carried supplies and ammunition to schooners trapped in ice. Governor P. F. Thomas brought in the captain of Daisy Archer in for supplies and then returned him to the schooner in West River then transporting supplies for Frolic trapped in Eastern Bay. In an example of normal enforcement duties Frolic made a raid on "scrapers" (dredgers) illegally harvesting in Eastern Bay during March 1894 resulting arrest of three sloops and one bugeye. Each paid a $25 fine.

In 1904, of the eleven sailing schooners of the fleet, Frolic was in need of extensive repairs and Julia Hamilton was in need of replacement. (Note: Julia Hamilton continued to operate through World War I and was sold in 1918 for $350.) The logbook, now in the Chesapeake Bay Maritime Museum collection, kept by Deputy Commander John W. Jones when he commanded Frolic from September 1904 until September 1908 is perhaps the only surviving logbook of the State Fishery Force from the time.

The Navy approached the Conservation Commission shortly after the nation's entry into World War I proposing the commission's boats be used to maintain constant local patrols. The state legislature agreed that the boats and men of the state force would become part of the U.S. Naval Reserve providing they patrol the same districts for fisheries enforcement as well as federal interests with the benefit that patrol time would be increased and the expense for all be paid by the federal government. The Maryland State Fishery Force boats began operating under a contract in which they were under a free lease to the United States Navy in August 1917, serving as Squadron Number 8 of the 5th Naval District, patrolling their regular areas enforcing state conservation law and federal laws. They were under the command of a Conservation Commission member who was also a Lieutenant in the Navy with all expenses, wages, supplies and repairs paid by the federal government.

Frolic served in a non-commissioned status with the section patrol identification number SP-1336 during World War I. The Conservation Commission resumed full responsibility on 27 November 1918.

The Conservation Commission retired and sold the old schooners Frolic and Nellie Jackson in 1918 with Frolic bringing $800.00, considered a good price for age and condition.

== Other Maryland Fishery Force vessels ==
Bessie Jones, Buck, Daisy Archer, Dorothy, Frolic, Governor R. M. McLane, Julia Hamilton, Helen Baughman, Murray, Music, Nellie Jackson, Nettie, Severn, St. Mary's, and Swan
