= USS Murray (SP-1438) =

Patrol vessel of the United States Navy

History

United States
- Name: Murray
- Owner: Conservation Commission of Maryland
- Operator: Conservation Commission of Maryland
- Builder: Chance Marine Construction Company, Annapolis, Maryland
- Completed: 1915
- Acquired: 17 August 1917
- Fate: Returned to owner 26 November 1918
- Notes: Maryland State Fishery Force boat, dual state and Navy service during war

General characteristics
- Type: Patrol vessel
- Length: 55 ft (17 m)
- Beam: 13 ft (4.0 m)
- Draft: 4 ft 6 in (1.37 m)
- Speed: 10 mph (8.7 kn; 16 km/h) (Note: The Dictionary of Naval Fighting Ships is explicit using miles per hour with "10 m.p.h." instead of the usual nautical knot. Boats used on inland waters often had speed stated in statute miles per hour instead of the knot, the number of nautical miles made in an hour as a unit.)
- Complement: 6
- Armament: None

Murray was a fifty-five foot motorboat, part of the Maryland State Fishery Force, owned by the Conservation Commission of Maryland operating out of River Springs, Maryland, a landing in St. Mary's county, in the charge of Deputy Commander M. R. Bailey. The boat was built in 1915 by Chance Marine Construction Company at Annapolis, Maryland. Though Murray was given the Section Patrol number (SP-1438) while serving both the Conservation Commission and Navy during World War I there is no mention in the Navy records of a commissioned status.

The Navy approached the Conservation Commission shortly after the nation's entry into World War I proposing the commission's boats be used to maintain constant local patrols. The state legislature agreed that the boats and men of the state force would become part of the U.S. Naval Reserve providing they patrol the same districts for fisheries enforcement as well as federal interests with the benefit that patrol time would be increased and the expense for all be paid by the federal government. The Maryland State Fishery Force boats began operating under a contract in which they were under a free lease to the United States Navy in August 1917, serving as Squadron Number 8 of the 5th Naval District, patrolling their regular areas enforcing state conservation law and federal laws. They were under the command of a Conservation Commission member, George O. Haddaway, who was also a Lieutenant in the Navy and expenses, wages, supplies and repairs were paid by the federal government. (Note: A number of the boats used in conservation enforcement were private boats used for the season only. These do not seem to be involved.)

Murray was returned to the Conservation Commission on 26 November 1918. The boat was noted as not being in good condition on return and assigned to the Potomac District by the Conservation Commission.

== Other Maryland Fishery Force vessels ==
Bessie Jones, Buck, Daisy Archer, Dorothy, Frolic, Governor R. M. McLane, Julia Hamilton, Helen Baughman, Murray, Music, Nellie Jackson, Nettie, Severn, St. Mary's, and Swan
