= USS Nettie =

Patrol vessel of the United States Navy

History

United States
- Name: Nettie
- Completed: 1912
- Acquired: 17 August 1917 (Navy)
- Commissioned: 1917 (Navy)
- Decommissioned: 26 November 1918 (Navy)
- Notes: Maryland State Fishery Force boat, dual state and Navy service during war

General characteristics
- Type: Patrol vessel
- Tonnage: 5 tons
- Length: 41 ft (12 m)
- Beam: 9 ft (2.7 m)
- Draft: 2 ft 6 in (0.76 m)
- Speed: 8 kn (9.2 mph; 15 km/h)

Nettie, was a forty-one foot motorboat, part of the Maryland State Fishery Force, owned by the Conservation Commission of Maryland operating out of Solomons, Maryland, Maryland, in the charge of Deputy Commander Andrew I. Johnson. The boat was built in 1912 for the commission.

The Navy approached the Conservation Commission shortly after the nation's entry into World War I proposing the commission's boats be used to maintain constant local patrols. The state legislature agreed that the boats and men of the state force would become part of the U.S. Naval Reserve providing they patrol the same districts for fisheries enforcement as well as federal interests with the benefit that patrol time would be increased and the expense for all be paid by the federal government. The Maryland State Fishery Force boats began operating under a contract in which they were under a free lease to the United States Navy in August 1917, serving as Squadron Number 8 of the 5th Naval District, patrolling their regular areas enforcing state conservation law and federal laws. They were under the command of a Conservation Commission member, George O. Haddaway, who was also a Lieutenant in the Navy and expenses, wages, supplies and repairs were paid by the federal government. (Note: A number of the boats used in conservation enforcement were private boats used for the season only. These do not seem to be involved.)

Nettie was commissioned, (Note: Of four such State Fisheries Force boats "commissioned" is mentioned in connection with two. One is explicitly "placed in service" (the specific Navy term for non-commissioned vessels in operation) rather than commissioned. All the Maryland Conservation Commission boats were operated under contract and continued their usual Fisheries Force work while also undertaking federal enforcement in their naval role. They were under the command of their Fisheries Force officers who were also given a naval rating. The commissioning for the formal status of a United States Ship and "USS" for these boats is rather doubtful despite the word being used in DANFS.) assigned the Section Patrol number SP-1436, and operated from Solomons in the same Conservation Commission patrol area under Chief Master at Arms Andrew I. Johnson that included the Patuxent River and the adjoining Chesapeake Bay. In the extreme cold of February 1918 the boat became frozen in the ice for a time.

The State Fishery Force power boat Nettie was still in operation when the 1922 Annual Report for the Conservation Commission was published in January 1923.

== Other Maryland Fishery Force vessels ==
Bessie Jones, Buck, Daisy Archer, Dorothy, Frolic, Governor R. M. McLane, Julia Hamilton, Helen Baughman, Murray, Music, Nellie Jackson, Nettie, Severn, St. Mary's, and Swan
