= St. Mary's (motorboat) =

Patrol vessel of the United States Navy

- Conservation Commission motorboat St. Mary's, c. 1918.

History

United States
- Name: St. Mary's
- Namesake: St. Mary's County, Maryland
- Builder: Ruark, Hooper's Island, Maryland
- Completed: 1912
- Acquired: 17 August 1917 (Navy under contract-lease)
- In service: 17 October 1917 (Navy under contract-lease)
- Out of service: 26 November 1918 (Navy under contract-lease)
- Notes: Maryland State Fishery Force boat, dual state and Navy service during war

General characteristics
- Type: Patrol vessel
- Length: 49 ft (15 m)
- Beam: 12 ft (3.7 m)
- Draft: 3 ft (0.91 m) mean
- Speed: 8 mph (7.0 kn; 13 km/h) (Note: The Dictionary of Naval Fighting Ships is explicit using miles per hour with "8 mph." instead of the usual nautical knot. Boats used on inland waters often had speed stated in statute miles per hour instead of the knot, the number of nautical miles made in an hour as a unit.)

St. Mary's was a forty-nine foot motorboat, part of the Maryland State Fishery Force, owned by the Conservation Commission of Maryland operating out of Wynne, Maryland (Note: Wynne is a location on the Potomac river south of the St. Mary's river between Point Lookout and St. Mary's City.) in the charge of Deputy Commander A. P. Cullinson. The boat was built in 1912 by Ruark of Hooper's Island, Maryland for the commission.

The Navy approached the Conservation Commission shortly after the nation's entry into World War I proposing the commission's boats be used to maintain constant local patrols. The state legislature agreed that the boats and men of the state force would become part of the U.S. Naval Reserve providing they patrol the same districts for fisheries enforcement as well as federal interests with the benefit that patrol time would be increased and the expense for all be paid by the federal government. The Maryland State Fishery Force boats began operating under a contract in which they were under a free lease to the United States Navy in August 1917, serving as Squadron Number 8 of the 5th Naval District, patrolling their regular areas enforcing state conservation law and federal laws. They were under the command of a Conservation Commission member, George O. Haddaway, who was also a Lieutenant in the Navy and expenses, wages, supplies and repairs were paid by the federal government. (Note: A number of the boats used in conservation enforcement were private boats used for the season only. These do not seem to be involved.)

St. Mary's was placed in service 17 October 1917 under A. P. Cullinson, the Conservation Commission's usual officer with the Navy rating of Chief Master at Arms, and given the Section Patrol number (SP-1457) while serving both the Conservation Commission and Navy during World War I. St. Mary's was assigned to the Baltimore Section of the 5th Naval District and an area on the Chesapeake Bay and on the Potomac River between Point Lookout, Maryland, and the mouth of the St. Mary's River, the boat's usual Fishery Force area, for the rest of World War I and for two weeks after it ended, concluding her final patrol on 25 November 1918 with the state Conservation Commission taking full responsibility on 26 November 1918.

The State Fishery Force power boat St. Mary's was still in operation when the 1922 Annual Report for the Conservation Commission was published in January 1923.

== Other Maryland Fishery Force vessels ==
Bessie Jones, Buck, Daisy Archer, Dorothy, Frolic, Governor R. M. McLane, Julia Hamilton, Helen Baughman, Murray, Music, Nellie Jackson, Nettie, Severn, St. Mary's, and Swan
