= Governor R. M. McLane (steamboat) =

Patrol vessel of the United States Navy

Coordinates: 39.274528°N 76.600057°W

- Maryland State steamer Gov. Robert M. McLane, ca. 1918.

History

United States
- Name: Governor R. M. McLane
- Namesake: Robert Milligan McLane (1815–1898), Governor of Maryland (1884–1885)
- Owner: State of Maryland
- Operator: Maryland State Oyster Police Force; Maryland State Fishery Force
- Builder: Neafie and Levy, Philadelphia, Pennsylvania
- Completed: 1884
- Identification: Official Number: 85858 (original); 234375 (new numbering); Signal: WOGF
- Status: As of 2003, resting on harbor bottom, partially submerged, at Baltimore, Maryland
- Notes: Operated as state police steamboat 1884–1917 and from 1918

General characteristics
- Type: Patrol vessel
- Tonnage: 144.54 GRT
- Displacement: (Note: DANFS uses the figure 144 prefixed with "dp" for displacement but this is likely an error as the registered and displacement are not equal.)
- Length: 120 ft (37 m) LOA
- Beam: 21 ft (6.4 m) (1886 registry); 22 ft (6.7 m) (Navy)
- Draft: 6 ft 9 in (2.06 m)
- Depth: 10.5 ft (3.2 m)
- Propulsion: Steam engine
- Speed: 13 kn (15 mph; 24 km/h)
- Armament: 12-pound Dahlgren boat howitzer (Oyster Police Force); 1 × 1-pounder gun

Governor R. M. McLane, was a steamboat built in 1884 that served the state of Maryland as an enforcement and survey vessel.

Maryland's State Oyster Police Force (“Oyster Navy”) was established to enforce state conservation laws designed to protect Maryland's oyster resources when out of state, often New England, dredgers began destroying reefs. Later local opposition to licenses turned to open "warfare" in the "oyster wars" during which open battles took place. Governor R. M. McLane, after replacing an older steamer, Leila, was armed with the cannon the earlier vessel had used in engagements.

Maryland's leasing plans with natural oyster reefs open to small interests and large tracts of "barren bottom" leased to large fishing interest depended upon accurate surveys of the location of natural oyster reefs. That survey was supported by Governor R. M. McLane which was also detailed to the state Shell Fish Commission seasonally for research.

During World War I all the Maryland State Fisheries Force became part of the Naval Reserve in the United States Navy as a patrol vessel from 1917 to 1918.

After return to normal service the steamer suffered extensive damage, "burned to the waterline" according to reports, but was rebuilt using insurance money. Governor R. M. McLane continued in service as the largest vessel of the fleet.

== Maryland state boat ==
Governor R. M. McLane was built in 1884 by Neafie and Levy at Philadelphia as the first of two identical steamers, the other being Governor P. F. Thomas, for the state of Maryland. (Note: Eighteenth Annual List of Merchant Vessels of the United States, Year ended June 30, 1886, page 327, lists Governor P. F. Thomas (O/N 85869) immediately above Governor Rob't M. McLane with identical specifications, year and place of build. Both were 144.54 GRT, 72.27 NET, 113.8' length (registered), 21' breadth, 10.5' depth and 275 nominal hp. Governor P. F. Thomas was sold after the war and is listed in 1920 as tow boat Mary W. Potter (O/N 215571).) General characteristics from 1886 registration are for a steel-hulled, 144.54 GRT steam vessel, official number 85858, 113.8 ft (34.7 m) registered length, 21 ft (6.4 m) and depth of 10.5 ft (3.2 m). World War I-era Navy figures are 120 ft (37 m) length overall, 22 ft (6.7 m) beam, 6 ft 9 in (2.06 m) draft and a speed of 13 kn (15 mph; 24 km/h).

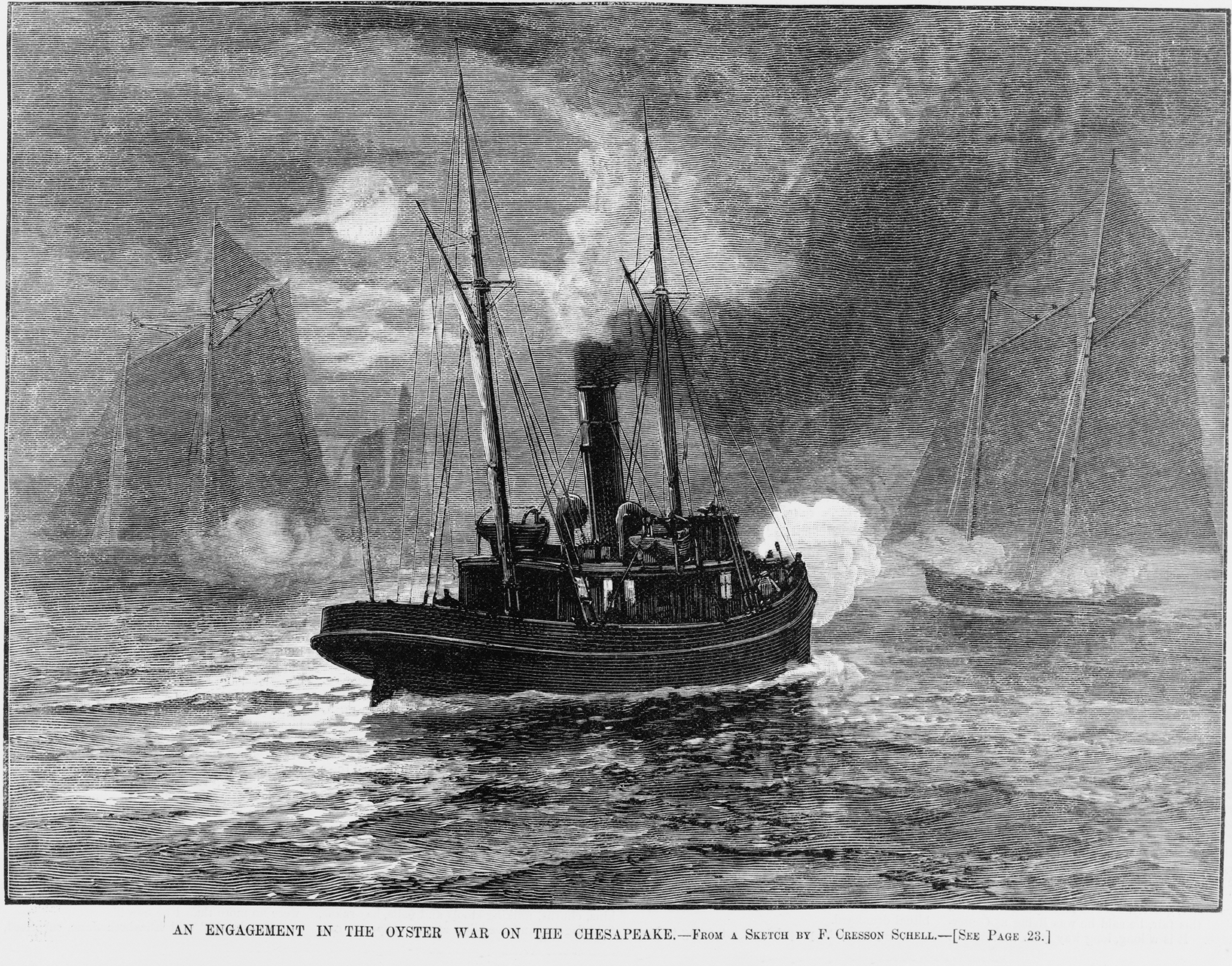
Engagement in the oyster war on the Chesapeake, 1886. Unidentified but possibly Governor R. M. McLane.

The steamer was part of the Maryland's Oyster Police Force (“Oyster Navy”) established in 1868 by the General Assembly to protect the state's oyster industry from local and out of state dredgers and enforce a licensing system. Resistance came from oyster poachers, termed "oyster pirates" locally, resulting in armed conflicts between vessels that eventually included small cannon. Governor R. M. McLane replaced the first "Oyster Navy" steamer Leila in 1884. Leila had been armed with a 12-pound Dahlgren boat howitzer and engaged in at least one major fight in February 1884 and that weapon may have been transferred to the later steamer that had that type of gun. On 10 December 1888 Governor R. M. McLane, responding to a pirate attack that involved firing on a passenger steamer on the Chester River was ambushed by a flotilla of pirate boats. The steamer responded by ramming and sinking two boats and taking twenty-four pirates prisoner. The police schooner Julia Hamilton found pirates on oyster beds in late December, ordered them off, but they returned and the police schooner attacked them resulting in several hours engagement with over 600 shots fired by police aboard Julia Hamilton. The pirates were routed, one being shot through an arm and boats riddled. State forces were reinforced by Governor R. M. McLane and five dredging schooners were captured, though their captains escaped, and towed into Cambridge, Maryland.

Maryland passed an act in 1906 to establish an oyster industry and culture that recognized the need for a complete survey of the natural oyster beds in the state's Chesapeake waters. The issue of existing leases to small oystering operations on natural beds and encouragement of larger operations on much larger leases to be developed by oyster culture depended on accurate mapping of the natural beds and bottom suitable for culture and development of new beds. Governor R. M. McLane participated in the resulting survey, particularly in the more open waters that weather could make dangerous for the small boats, and in towing the survey houseboat and supporting the survey in general. The steamer was on loan to the Shell Fish Commission during critical seasons.

On 21 July 1916 a first meeting between the Maryland Commission and Virginia authorities took place aboard Governor R. M. McLane in the Potomac River to agree on uniform rules to be enforced by both states. That meeting led to a second meeting August 16, 1917 that also included representatives of the United States Bureau of Fisheries and United States Engineers for the Norfolk and Washington districts to continue cooperation and ensure uniform law enforcement on the Potomac.

By 1917 the steamer was part of the Maryland State Fishery Force, successor to the Oyster Police Force, and owned by the Conservation Commission of Maryland.

== World War I dual service ==
The Navy approached the Conservation Commission shortly after the nation's entry into World War I proposing the commission's boats be used to maintain constant local patrols. The state legislature agreed that the boats and men of the state force would become part of the U.S. Naval Reserve providing they patrol the same districts for fisheries enforcement as well as federal interests with the benefit that patrol time would be increased and the expense for all be paid by the federal government. The Maryland State Fishery Force boats began operating under a contract in which they were under a free lease to the United States Navy in August 1917, serving as Squadron Number 8 of the 5th Naval District, patrolling their regular areas enforcing state conservation law and federal laws. They were under the command of a Conservation Commission member who was also a Lieutenant in the Navy with all expenses, wages, supplies and repairs paid by the federal government.

The navy commissioned the ship on 6 August 1917 as USS Governor R. M. McLane assigning the Section Patrol number SP-1328. Assigned to the 5th Naval District, Governor R. M. McLane served as a patrol craft in the Chesapeake Bay for the remainder of World War I. Her cruising grounds included Baltimore Harbor, the Patuxent River, and the Severn River, and Tangier Sound. During November 1918 she was used briefly as a towing boat by Indian Head Naval Proving Ground at Indian Head, Maryland. Governor R. M. McLane was returned to the Conservation Commission on 30 November 1918.

== Post war ==
After the war the commission began modernizing the fleet in general with Governor R. M. McLane taken out of service at the beginning of summer 1919 for engine repairs including a new engine bed. The work was done and the vessel was in service condition when on 3 December she was nearly destroyed by fire while moored at the piers of Canton Lumber Company adjacent to Spedden Shipbuilding in Baltimore where the steamer was to undergo inspection. Six other vessels were destroyed, including the 155.5 ft (47.4 m) U.S. Army passenger and freight steamer Major L'Enfant on which the ship's cook died in the fire. (Note: Major L'Enfant was an Army Quartermaster passenger and freight vessel built in 1901 in Philadelphia as Quaker City (ON 20633) then Sieur de Monts of 469 GRT with a complement of five officers and ten men. (see Merchant Vessels of the United States, 1018 & Neafie & Levy, Philadelphia PA)) The commission had the vessel surveyed and had plans prepared for rebuilding using the $35,000 in insurance money. To replace Governor R. M. McLane temporarily the Navy loaned the patrol vessel Hiawatha to the state.

Governor R. M. McLane was found to be repairable and was rebuilt by the Spedden Shipbuilding Company within the insurance payment to the state with completion in October and back in commission on 10 November 1920. In 1921 the steamer was based in Cambridge, Maryland in the charge of Deputy Commander A. S. Creighton and on 28 March, with the commission on board, left Baltimore on a tour of inspection of oyster beds suitable for planting oysters, considered essential to maintain the natural beds. The next year the steamer assisted with creation of new beds by planting oyster shell until withdrawn for other duty after completion of the "Diamond" area off Sharp's Island.

As late as January 1937 the "State Patrol Steamer Governor R. M. McLane, then of Annapolis, was in operation patrolling and doing inspection work on the Chesapeake. Governor R. M. McLane is listed in the Merchant Vessel Registers in the early 1940s with official number 234375 and signal WOGF with the last entry in the 1945 registry.

== Fate ==
As of February 2003, the hulk of Governor R. M. McLane, the deckhouse gone but deck still visible, rested partially submerged on the harbor bottom next to the piers of the Downtown Sailing Center on the grounds of the Baltimore Museum of Industry at Baltimore, Maryland.

== Other Maryland Fishery Force vessels ==
Bessie Jones, Buck, Daisy Archer, Dorothy, Frolic, Governor R. M. McLane, Julia Hamilton, Helen Baughman, Murray, Music, Nellie Jackson, Nettie, Severn, St. Mary's, and Swan
