= USS Severn (1918) =

Patrol vessel of the United States Navy

- Maryland Conservation Commission Fisheries Force Severn, ca. 1918.

History

United States
- Name: Severn
- Namesake: The Severn River in Maryland
- Completed: 1918
- Acquired: August 1917 (Navy — under lease, serving dual state/federal law enforcement role)
- Commissioned: 1 September 1918 (Navy)
- Stricken: 27 November 1918 (Navy)
- Fate: Traded by Conservation Commission for more suitable boat, 1921

General characteristics
- Type: Patrol vessel
- Length: 40 ft (12 m)
- Propulsion: 25hp Palmer engine

Severn was a forty-foot motorboat, part of the Maryland State Fishery Force, owned by the Conservation Commission of Maryland operating out of Wittman, Maryland in the charge of Deputy Commander George O. Haddaway. The boat had been purchased by the Commission in 1918, decked over with a pilot house added. It was powered by a 25-horsepower Palmer engine.

The Navy approached the Conservation Commission shortly after the nation's entry into World War I proposing the commission's boats be used to maintain constant local patrols. The state legislature agreed that the boats and men of the state force would become part of the U.S. Naval Reserve providing they patrol the same districts for fisheries enforcement as well as federal interests with the benefit that patrol time would be increased and the expense for all be paid by the federal government. The Maryland State Fishery Force boats began operating under a contract in which they were under a free lease to the United States Navy in August 1917, serving as Squadron Number 8 of the 5th Naval District, patrolling their regular areas enforcing state conservation law and federal laws. They were under the command of a Conservation Commission member, George O. Haddaway, who was also a Lieutenant in the Navy and expenses, wages, supplies and repairs were paid by the federal government. (Note: A number of the boats used in conservation enforcement were private boats used for the season only. These do not seem to be involved.)

The boat was commissioned 1 September 1918 by the Navy as USS Severn serving until 27 November 1918 when stricken from Navy lists. (Note: Ships' Data U.S. Naval Vessels is blank in most of the information blocks including when and where built.) The boat operated in the 5th Naval District, locally in the West River and Galesville, Maryland area, under the command of Chief Master at Arms George A. Haddaway, who had Severn as a Fishery Force boat prior to the war, for the remainder of the war. (Note: This operating area is on the western shore near Annapolis rather than the boat's original home waters on the Eastern Shore, isolated from the mainland at the time, thus an exception to the "patrolled their respective districts" in the reference. It is possible that Haddaway, as the boat's usual operator, was moved with the boat closer to the capital as commander of the squadron. There is also a clear discrepancy between the Maryland records and DANFS about Haddaway's rank. Maryland records have him as a Navy Lieutenant and DANFS Chief Master of Arms, a non commissioned officer rating. It is clear that Maryland considered Haddaway to be in command of the boats owned by Maryland and still enforcing state conservation law while contracted to the Navy with a dual role of enforcing federal law.) The Navy returned her to the Maryland Conservation Commission on 27 November 1918.

After return the boat was found to be in poor condition. It was placed out of commission and put up for sale. Severn was later traded for another boat more suitable for fisheries work.

== Other Maryland Fishery Force vessels ==
Bessie Jones, Buck, Daisy Archer, Dorothy, Frolic, Governor R. M. McLane, Julia Hamilton, Helen Baughman, Murray, Music, Nellie Jackson, Nettie, Severn, St. Mary's, and Swan
