= Julia Hamilton =

Patrol vessel of the United States Navy

History

United States
- Name: Julia Hamilton
- Namesake: Possibly for daughter of William Thomas Hamilton, Maryland's governor 1880 to 1884. (Note: Possibly named for Julia, daughter of William Thomas Hamilton, Maryland's governor 1880 to 1884 during the period in which the "oyster wars" were ongoing and the schooner became active. Julia Hamilton Briscoe survived her father and lived in the family home until 1922.)
- Owner: Maryland Conservation Commission
- Operator: State Oyster Police; State Fishery Force
- Fate: Sold 1918 by Maryland Conservation Commission for $350.00

General characteristics
- Type: Patrol vessel
- Length: 55 ft (17 m)
- Beam: 16 ft (4.9 m)
- Draft: 4 ft 6 in (1.37 m)
- Complement: 3
- Armament: Six pounder gun (Oyster Police Force)

Julia Hamilton was a Maryland State Oyster Police Force (“Oyster Navy”) schooner, part of the force established to enforce state conservation laws designed to protect Maryland's oyster resources when out of state, often New England, dredgers began destroying reefs in the Chesapeake Bay. Later local opposition to licenses turned to open "warfare" in the "oyster wars" when a fleet of state vessels fought "oyster pirates" in armed conflicts.

That force became the Maryland State Fishery Force under the Conservation Commission of Maryland with which the schooner served when the entire force, boats and men, became a part of the U.S. Naval Reserve in an agreement between the state and the Navy in 1917. Julia Hamilton continued to patrol the usual waters enforcing conservation law as well as federal law under the agreement. After the war the state modernized its force selling the older sailing vessels to be replaced by purpose built motor boats. The force was one of the elements forming today's Maryland Department of Natural Resources Police.

Maryland State Oyster Police Force (“Oyster Navy”) schooners, ca. 1918.

== State police boat ==
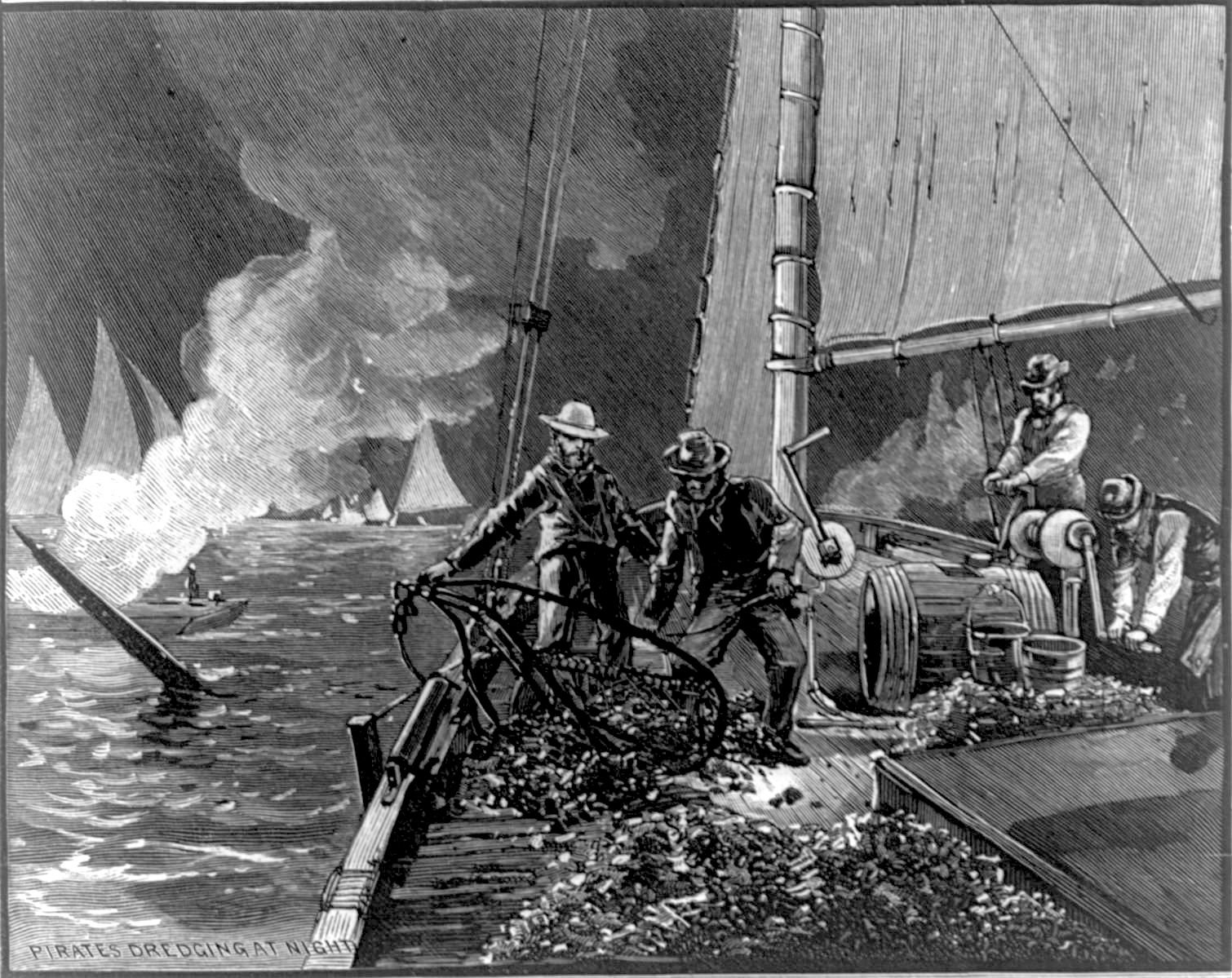
Oyster pirates in 1884. Part of the Library of Congress notation is "Ships Julia Hamilton" though the drawing features "pirate" night dredgers.

The background of the schooner is not clear but Julia Hamilton was definitely in commission as an Oyster Police Force boat when featured in a Harper's Weekly, March 1, 1884, illustration of oyster pirates "attaching the police schooner Julia Hamilton" related to one of the incidents of the oyster war. In February 1884 some hundred oyster pirates in some twenty vessels were at work dredging illegally when challenged by Captain John Insley of Julia Hamilton. They opened fire cutting the schooner's rigging to pieces and driving the police below decks even though the police had responded with the schooner's six pounder gun. The pirates boarded the schooner but called a truce when one of the pirates was killed. Captain Insley agreed to withdraw, resulting in accusations of cowardice after he refused to engage the pirates again. Local citizens appealed to Governor Robert McLane with the result the steamer William T. Hamilton was armed and Julia Hamilton reequipped and armed and directed to protect the oyster beds.

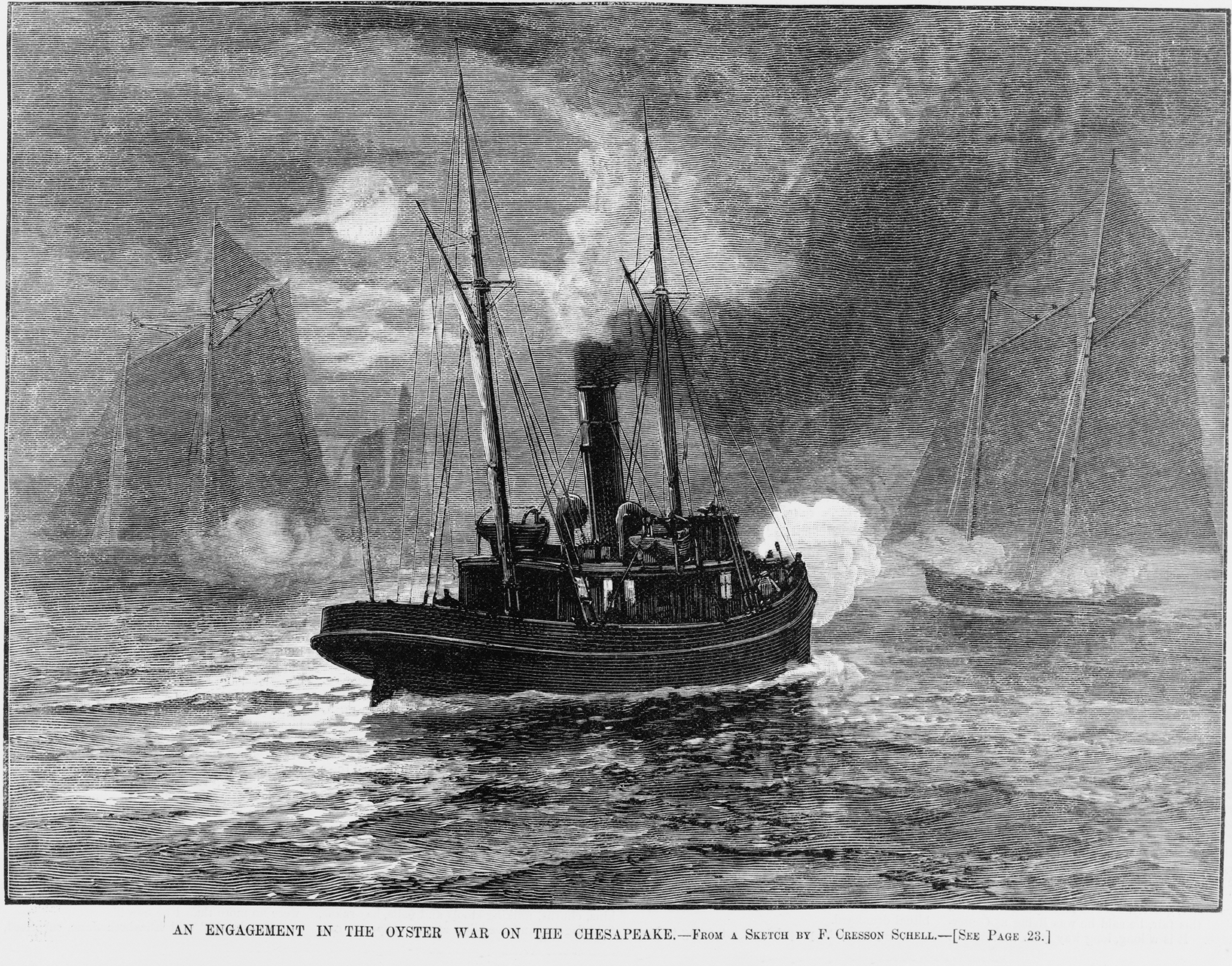
Engagement in the oyster war on the Chesapeake, 1886. Unidentified but possibly Governor R. M. McLane.

Engagements in the oyster wars continued with the state forces augmented for enforcement. In 1888 Julia Hamilton found pirates on oyster beds on a foggy morning with Captain Tyler ordering them off. They left in the fog but returned whereupon the police schooner attacked them resulting in several hours engagement with over 600 shots fired by police aboard Julia Hamilton. The pirates were routed, one being shot through an arm and boats riddled. State forces were reinforced by the police steamer Governor R. M. McLane and five dredging schooners were captured, though their captains escaped, and towed into Cambridge, Maryland.

The earliest death of a Maryland conservation officer was on 17 September 1893 when Josiah Bromwell, a mate aboard Julia Hamilton, was swept overboard in rough waters of the Little Choptank River to drown.

== World War I dual service ==
The Navy approached the Conservation Commission shortly after the nation's entry into World War I proposing the commission's boats be used to maintain constant local patrols. The state legislature agreed that the boats and men of the state force would become part of the U.S. Naval Reserve providing they patrol the same districts for fisheries enforcement as well as federal interests with the benefit that patrol time would be increased and the expense for all be paid by the federal government. The Maryland State Fishery Force boats began operating under a contract in which they were under a free lease to the United States Navy in August 1917, serving as Squadron Number 8 of the 5th Naval District, patrolling their regular areas enforcing state conservation law and federal laws. They were under the command of a Conservation Commission member who was also a Lieutenant in the Navy with all expenses, wages, supplies and repairs paid by the federal government.

The schooner entered service, there is no indication of commissioned status, with the Section Patrol designation (SP-1460). The Conservation Commission assumed full responsibility when the Navy released all the vessels and men on 28 March 1918. (Note: DANFS uses ID-1460, but type of service was definitely "patrol" rather than that of the usual ID vessels.)

== Retirement and sale ==
The commission began replacing its older sailing vessels with new power boats in 1918. Two new boats, Kent and Talbot were acquired with Severn being purchased. The schooners Julia Hamilton, Helen Baughman, Bessie Jones, and Anna B. Smith were retired and sold along with the motorized, converted schooner, Daisy Archer. Julia Hamilton was sold for $350.00.

== Other Maryland Fishery Force vessels ==
Bessie Jones, Buck, Daisy Archer, Dorothy, Frolic, Governor R. M. McLane, Julia Hamilton, Helen Baughman, Murray, Music, Nellie Jackson, Nettie, Severn, St. Mary's, and Swan
