= USS Music =

Patrol vessel of the United States Navy

History

United States
- Name: Music
- Owner: Conservation Commission of Maryland
- Operator: Maryland State Fishery Force
- Builder: Chance Marine Construction Company, Annapolis, Maryland
- Completed: 1914
- Acquired: 17 August 1917 (for joint operation)
- Commissioned: 17 August 1917
- Fate: Returned to exclusive Fishery Force operation 24 September 1918. Sold 1920.
- Notes: Maryland State Fishery Force vessels and crews operated in dual state/Navy role during war.

General characteristics
- Type: Patrol vessel
- Displacement: 18 tons
- Length: 41 ft (12 m)
- Beam: 9 ft (2.7 m)
- Draft: 2 ft 6 in (0.76 m)
- Speed: 8 knots
- Armament: 1 × 1-pounder gun

USS Music (SP-1288) was a Maryland State Fishery Force power boat owned by the Conservation Commission of Maryland that operated as a United States Navy patrol vessel in a dual state/Navy role during 1917–1918. The boat was built as a civilian motor launch in 1914 by the Chance Marine Construction Company at Annapolis, Maryland.

The Navy approached the Conservation Commission shortly after the nation's entry into World War I, proposing the commission's boats be used to maintain constant local patrols. The state legislature agreed that the boats and men of the state force would become part of the U.S. Naval Reserve, provided they patrolled the same districts for fisheries enforcement as well as federal interests with the benefit that patrol time would be increased and the expense for all be paid by the federal government. The Maryland State Fishery Force boats began operating in August 1917 under a contract in which they were under a free lease to the United States Navy, serving as Squadron Number 8 of the 5th Naval District, patrolling their regular areas enforcing state conservation law and federal laws. They were under the command of a Conservation Commission member who was also a Lieutenant in the Navy with all expenses, wages, supplies and repairs paid by the federal government.

On 17 August 1917 Music became a section patrol boat under the agreement and was commissioned as USS Music (SP-1288) assigned to the 5th Naval District. Music served on patrol and inspection duties in Hampton Roads and on the Elizabeth River in Virginia during World War I. Music returned to exclusive use by the Conservation Commission on 24 September 1918.

On return to the state force the boat was assigned to patrol out of Port Republic, Maryland along with the power boat Dorothy. In 1920 older boats were sold with Music being sold for $625.

== See also ==
- USS Severn (1918)
- St. Mary's (motorboat)
- Governor R. M. McLane (steamboat)

== Other Maryland Fishery Force vessels ==
Bessie Jones, Buck, Daisy Archer, Dorothy, Frolic, Governor R. M. McLane, Julia Hamilton, Helen Baughman, Murray, Music, Nellie Jackson, Nettie, Severn, St. Mary's, and Swan
