= Daisy Archer (motorboat) =

History

United States
- Name: Daisy Archer
- Namesake: Previous name retained.
- Acquired: 1917 (Navy service)
- Out of service: 1918
- Fate: Returned to owner 27 November 1918 then sold.

General characteristics
- Type: Patrol boat
- Notes: Maryland State Fisheries Force converted schooner.

Daisy Archer was a schooner of the Maryland State Fisheries Force converted at some time before 1917 into a motorboat. The vessel entered into the United States Navy under an agreement with Maryland for joint state and federal service during World War I as a patrol boat with identification ID-1283 from 1917 to 1918.

In 1891 the schooner, part of what was then nicknamed the "Oyster Police Navy," supported a scientific survey of southern Maryland sponsored by Johns Hopkins University, Maryland Agricultural College and the U.S. Geological Survey. The lead vessel was the force's steamer Governor P. F. Thomas with the force's schooners Daisy Archer and Folly in support. The survey's scope ranged from natural resources to archaeology.

During an extreme cold period in January 1893, with Annapolis iced in and ice extending across the upper Chesapeake Bay, many of the force's schooners were frozen in ice. The force's steamers, Governor R. M. McLane and Governor P. F. Thomas, along with tugs broke ice keeping a narrow channel in Annapolis clear and then carried supplies and ammunition to schooners trapped in ice. Governor P. F. Thomas brought in the captain of Daisy Archer in for supplies and then returned him to the schooner in West River.

Daisy Archer was acquired by the Navy from the Conservation Commission of Maryland under a contract between the state and Navy in 1917. The Fishery Force vessels operated in a dual role of state fishery enforcement and Navy patrol from August 1917 to November 1918. She was placed in service in the 5th Naval District, where she engaged in patrol and transport duties. She was returned to her owner on 27 November 1918. The vessel, along with the older Fishery Force schooners Julia Hamilton, Helen Baughman, Bessie Jones and Anna B. Smith were then sold by the commission.

== See also ==
- Julia Hamilton
- Governor R. M. McLane

== Other Maryland Fishery Force vessels ==
Bessie Jones, Buck, Daisy Archer, Dorothy, Frolic, Governor R. M. McLane, Julia Hamilton, Helen Baughman, Murray, Music, Nellie Jackson, Nettie, Severn, St. Mary's, and Swan
