= Charmian II =

Charmian II may refer to the following vessels:

- Charmian II, a dinghy of the Dublin Bay Mermaid type built in 1953
- Charmian II (Motorboat), 1915, racing express cruiser, USS Charmian II (SP-696) from 1917 to 1918
