= Charmian II (Motorboat) =

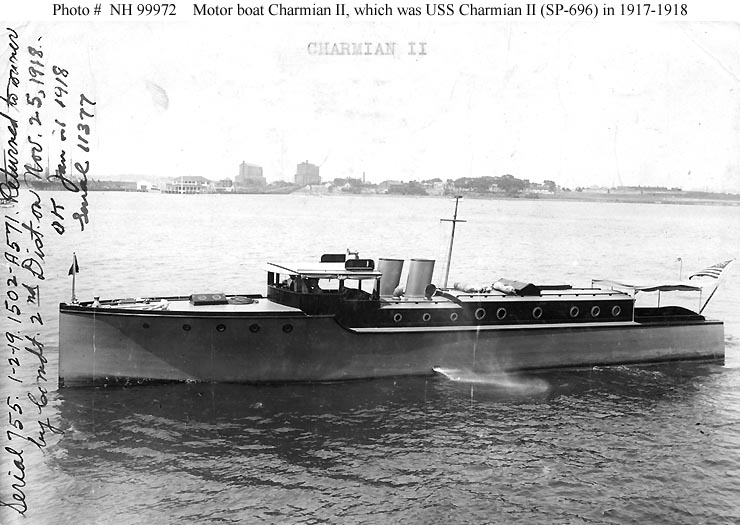
- Charmian II 1915.

History

United States
- Name: Charmian II
- Owner: C. Huges Manly (1915—1917?); J. E. Stanton Jr. (1917?—?); Richard Malcomson (?—1930)
- Builder: Chance Marine Construction Company, Annapolis, Maryland
- Completed: 1915
- In service: 1915
- Out of service: 1931
- Identification: U.S. Official Number: 213321
- Fate: "Abandoned" 1931
- Notes: Free lease by the Navy 29 May 1917, returned to owner & struck 25 November 1918,

General characteristics
- Type: Express cruiser
- Tonnage: 23 GRT, 15 NRT
- Length: 59 ft (18 m) (LOA); 52.8 ft (16.1 m) (Registry)
- Beam: 11 ft (3.4 m); 10.9 ft (3.3 m) (registered)
- Draft: 3 ft (0.91 m)
- Depth: 6 ft (1.8 m)
- Propulsion: 2 X 8 cylinder, 150 hp. Sterling gasoline engines
- Speed: 28 kn (32 mph; 52 km/h) (Note: An oddity of the period was mixing miles per hour and knots (and use of "knot" as a unit of distance) in the same articles about the same boat. It also was not uncommon for non sea going vessels and boats, particularly inland craft, to have speeds in statute miles per hour. See Talk for details of this case.)

Charmian II was an express cruiser owned by C. Huges Manly of Baltimore built in Annapolis, Maryland by Chance Marine Construction Company and in September 1915 thought by boating observers after trials to be perhaps the fastest cruiser in her class in the United States. The 59 ft (18.0 m) cruiser was the largest V-bottom cruiser at the time. Manly was a member of both the Baltimore Yacht Club and Maryland Motor Boat Club with Charmian II a part of both fleets.

Charmian II was built in 1915 with the overall design by Lewis R. Baker of Baltimore. The cruiser is noted as one of the vessels assigned official numbers and signals by the Department of Commerce, Bureau of Navigation for the week ended June 5, 1915. Lloyd's Register 1917 gives dimensions as 58 ft 4 in (17.8 m) length overall and at the waterline, 10 ft 11 in (3.3 m) beam, depth of 6 ft (1.8 m) and 3 ft (0.91 m) draft. The cruiser was registered for 1920 with U.S. Official Number 213321, at 23 GRT, 15 NRT, 52.8 ft (16.1 m) registry length, 10.9 ft (3.3 m) beam, 6 ft (1.8 m) depth, with 300 indicated horsepower and two crew.

The cruiser was powered by two 8 cylinder, 150 horsepower Sterling gasoline engines located, along with an electric generating set located aft and between the engines in a spacious engine room absent much of the clutter such as bells due to the design of the controls. Various speeds are mentioned, in both miles per hour and knots with sources agreeing on a top speed of 28 kn (32 mph; 52 km/h),

The 11 ft (3.4 m) beam cruiser accommodated five people for extended cruises with a double stateroom and toilet forward of the bridge and a storage are and aft of the chain locker in the bow. Aft of the bridge and underneath storage was the 13 ft (4.0 m) long engine room. Going aft was a single stateroom, toilet, galley, and a 9 ft (2.7 m) salon with two transom berths. Aft was a self bailing cockpit. The interior was furnished in mahogany and white enamel.

The cruiser participated in races, some of considerable length. Manly and the cruiser are shown as running and winning the 368.5 nmi (424.1 mi; 682.5 km) Baltimore to Camden race in 1915. By 1917 the cruiser was owned by J. E. Stanton Jr. of New Bedford, Massachusetts with the cruiser registered in New York.

The United States Navy acquired the vessel from Stanton under free lease on 29 May 1917 for use during World War I as the Section Patrol vessel USS Charmian II (SP-696). The cruiser was assigned to the 2nd Naval District in southern New England, Charmian II served on patrol duty for the rest of World War I. The Navy returned Charmian II to Stanton on 25 November 1918. (Note: Dictionary of American Naval Fighting Ships explicitly states "placed in service" which usually means non-commissioned status. The old Naval Historical Center photo page explicitly states "placed in commission" which would justify the U.S.S. prefix.)

The 1930 U.S. register shows the cruiser as owned by Richard Malcomson of New York with the 1931 register listing Charmian II as "abandoned."
