= Dancing Molly =

American pirate sloop

History
- Name: The Dancing Molly
- In service: 1883

The Dancing Molly was a pirate sloop famous during the Chesapeake Oyster Wars (1865–1959) for humiliating Virginia Governor William E. Cameron as he personally attempted its capture on 28 February 1883. Crewed solely by "plucky petticoated pirates" in the form of the captain's wife and two daughters, the single-masted sailboat outran the steamers Victoria J Peed and Pamlico while under fire.

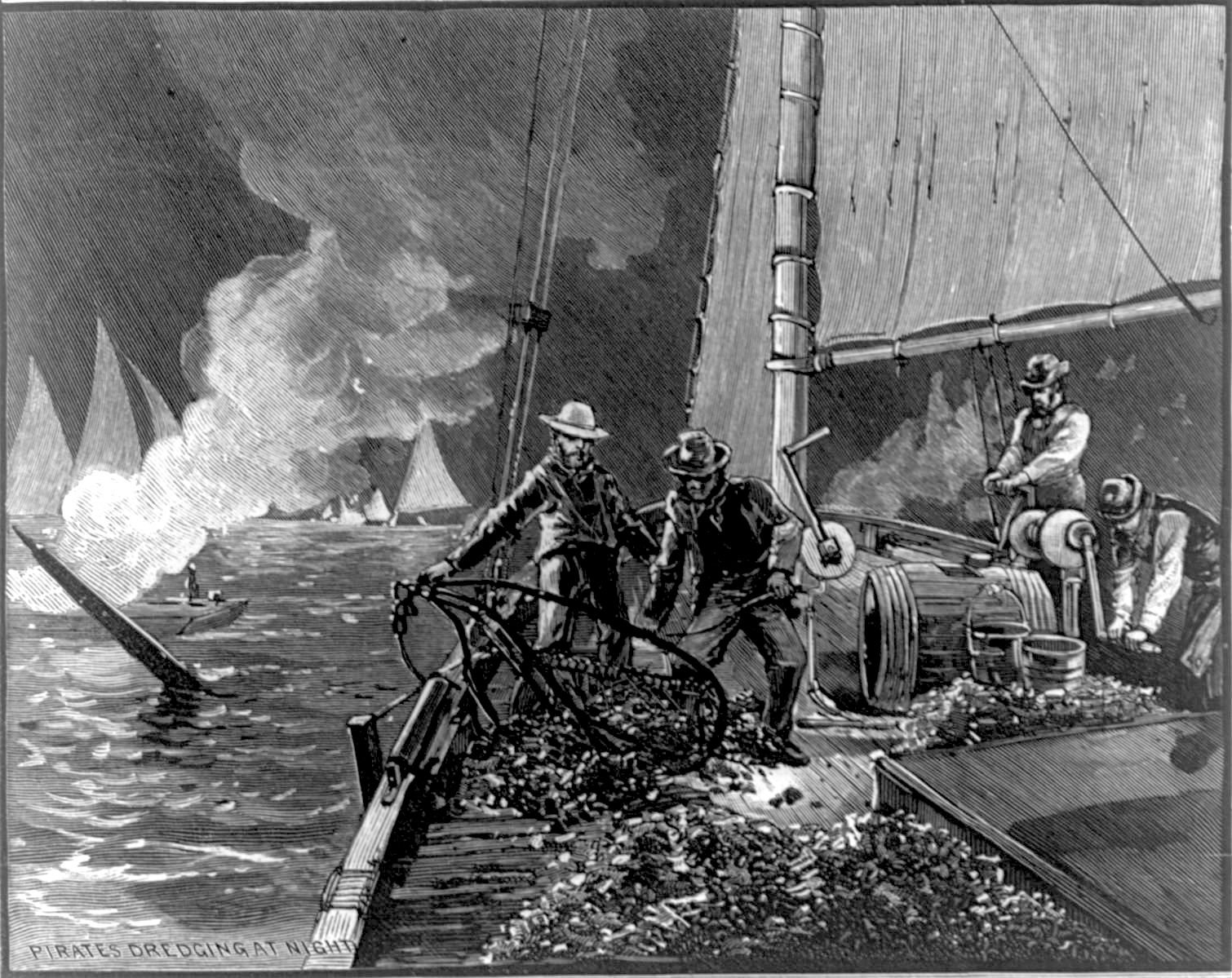
The oyster war in Chesapeake Bay

== Background ==
By 1865, the states of Maryland and Virginia had passed laws that limited the harvesting of oysters from Chesapeake Bay. Fishermen from other New England states began encroaching on the bay after their local oyster beds were overfished and exhausted. By the 1880s, the Chesapeake was the source of almost half the world's supply of oysters, with illegal harvesting by oyster pirates.

== Encounter with Governor Cameron ==
Having successfully captured seven oyster pirate boats in a raid the year before, Cameron set out to capture more in the steamers Victoria J Peed and Pamlico. To ensure media attention, the latter ship contained Cameron, his staff, and reporters from the New York Herald, Norfolk Evening Ledger, and Norfolk Virginian. Spotting the apparently abandoned Molly in an inlet (the other crew were gathering wood on shore), Cameron's ships headed to capture it, not knowing the wife and two daughters of Molly's captain were still aboard. A contemporary newspaper account describes:

[A]s the steady splash of the wheels of the Virginia steamer were distinctly heard, the plucky females determined to attempt to run the blockage and reach neutral waters, despite the three frowning cannons which were already visible. … The race was nip and tuck between the Virginia gunboat and the piratical sloop, the first trying to reach the mouth of the inlet and blockade it, while the latter was straining every sail to get out. … The chase, which was witnessed from shore, was very exciting, and, although the people on the Virginia side are sworn enemies of the oyster pirates, they really wished for the escape of the tiny craft. … [W]hen the Dancing Molly got safely out the group of Virginians chivalrously gave three cheers for the pirate's wife and daughters.

The encounter led to a series of letters and editorials ridiculing Cameron, as the "laughing maidens of the 'Dancing Molly,' so completely outmaneuvered him" and jesting that Cameron's official report "on the oyster question" would be "replete with references to … the laughing lassies of the Dancing Molly." Combined with other difficulties in capturing oyster pirates, the embarrassed Cameron never sent an expedition against them again.
