= San Leandro Oyster Beds =

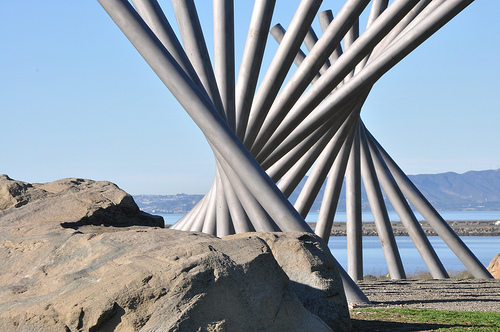

- Location within California
- 37°41′43.22″N 122°11′35.87″W
- Location: San Leandro Marina, San Leandro, California

California Historical Landmark
- Designated: 1968
- Reference no.: 824

The San Leandro Oyster Beds in San Leandro, California, were the origin of the oyster industry in the U.S. state of California. During the 1890s, the oyster industry thrived until it became the single most important fishery in the state. According to the description provided by the California Office of Historic Preservation, Moses Wicks is supposed to have been the first to bring seed oysters around Cape Horn and implant them in the San Leandro beds. The oyster industry in San Francisco Bay was at its height around the turn of the 20th century. It reached a secondary peak by 1911 and then faded away because of polluted conditions of the bay.

The former site of the oyster beds was named a California Historical Landmark (#824) and is located in the San Leandro Marina. The historical marker has been stolen but the mounting holes remain in a large mosaic depicting oyster harvesting early in the 1900s. A photograph of the site is available online. It shows the curved mosaic mural and the space where the historical marker was formerly located.

== See also ==
- Oyster pirate
