= The Oyster Question =

2009 book by Christine Keiner

- Author: Christine Keiner
- Language: English
- Subject: Environmental history; history of science; conservation
- Published: 2009
- Publication place: USA
- Media type: Print
- Pages: 352
- ISBN: 978-0820326986

The Oyster Question: Scientists, Watermen, and the Maryland Chesapeake Bay since 1880 is a 2009 book by Christine Keiner. It examines the conflict between oystermen and scientists in the Chesapeake Bay from the end of the nineteenth century to the present, which includes the period of the so-called "Oyster Wars" and the precipitous decline of the oyster industry at the end of the twentieth century. The book engages the myth of the "Tragedy of the Commons" by examining the often fraught relationship between local politics and conservation science, arguing that for most of the period Maryland's state political system gave rural oystermen more political clout than politicians and the scientists they appointed and allowed oystermen to effectively manage the oyster bed commons. Only towards the end of the twentieth century did reapportionment bring suburban and urban interests more political power, by which time they had latched on to oystermen as elements of the area's heritage and incorporated them and the oysters into broader conservation efforts. An important theme is the "intersection[] of scientific knowledge with experiential knowledge in the context of use," in that Keiner "treats the knowledge of the Chesapeake Bay’s oystermen alongside that of biologists." "Through her analysis, Keiner effectively reframes how environmental historians have analyzed histories of common resources and provides a working model for integrating historical and ecological information to bridge the histories of science and environmental history."

== Awards ==
The book won the 2010 Forum for the History of Science in America Prize. It shared the 2010 Maryland Historical Trust's Heritage Book Award, and received an Honorable Mention for the Frederick Jackson Turner Award from the Organization of American Historians in 2010.
