= Dublin Bay Mermaid =

The Dublin Bay Mermaid is a one-design, wooden sailing dinghy originally designed for sailing in Dublin Bay, Ireland.

It is a 17-foot, half-decked, centreboard boat rigged as a Bermuda sloop, designed for the Dublin Bay Sailing Club in 1932 by John B. Kearney. The class still actively races with fleets in Dun Laoghaire, Rush, Skerries and Foynes. The class usually have 5 Championship level events every year, these include the Munster Championship, the Leinster Championship, the National Championship, Skerries Regatta and Rush Regatta. Regular club racing also runs from May to September but can start as early as April and continue up until the end of October depending on the club. The national class association is the Mermaid Sailing Association.

The boats have a helm and 2 crew with a main sail, jib and spinnaker. The Olympic racing course is most commonly used at Championship level racing events and the class gets great levels of turnouts with a minimum of 20-30 boats always competing at the National Championship event which is held every year.

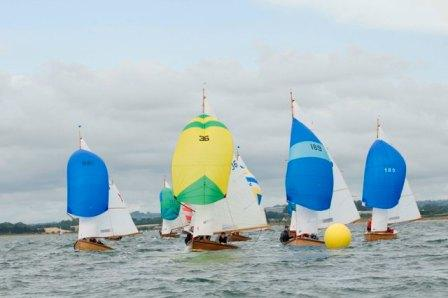
Dublin Bay Mermaids sailing in Rush, North Dublin, August 2008

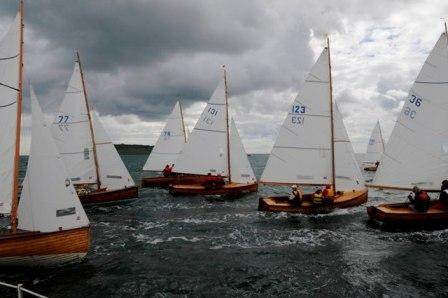
Dublin Bay Mermaids starting a race, August 2008

The table below lists the pre-1940 boats with their original names are. The boats were not completed in numerical order as sail numbers were not allocated until some years after the first Mermaids were launched.:

== Mermaids ==
Name	Sail No.	Builder	Year Launched	Fate	Notes
Amy	1	Walter Levinge, Athlone	1933 or 1934	Still exists	Prototype
Delphis	2	Michael Mahony, Dun Laoghaire	1935 or 1936	Wrecked 1963	
Iolar	3	John Gray, Dun Laoghaire	1935 or 1936	Still exists	
Stella	4	Henry Skinner, Baltimore	1937	Wrecked 1964	
Celia	5	Henry Skinner, Baltimore	1937	Still exists	
Oonagh	11	Walter Levinge, Athlone	1937	Still exists	Originally No. 4, changed in 1938
Daphne	6	Henry Skinner, Baltimore	1938/39	Still exists	
Ruby	7	Henry Skinner, Baltimore	1938/39	Still exists	
Tuano	10	John Gray, Dun Laoghaire	1938	Wrecked 1985	Later renamed Falcon
Eight	8	Henry Skinner, Baltimore	1939	Still exists	Renamed Minx in 1941
Minthamme	9	Henry Skinner, Baltimore	1939	Still exists	Renamed Mantis in 1940
Nombril	12	Christy Mahony, Dun Laoghaire	1939	Still exists	Later renamed Maybe
Dabchick	14	Henry Skinner, Baltimore	1939	Still exists	
Olga	15	Christy Mahony, Dun Laoghaire	1939	Wrecked 1995	
Nike	18	Henry Skinner, Baltimore	1939	Still exists	Originally No. 13, changed in 1945. Renamed Claire

See the table below for a full list of boats. An * indicates that the number originally used on an earlier boat, since wrecked or broken up. 'W' and 'B' after a number indicates wrecked or broken up respectively. A name or names in brackets indicates earlier name(s). Boats highlighted in bold have won the National Championship.

Sail No.	Name	Year built	Sail No.	Name	Year built	Sail No.	Name	Year built	Sail No.	Name	Year built
1	Amy	1933/34	51	Siobhan	1949	101	Fiona	1962	151	Cherokee	1971
2 W	Delphis	1935/36	52	Amelia (Mehitabel)	1949	**102**	**Endeavour**	1962	152	Jo-Col	1973
3	Iolar	1935/36	53	Miranda	1949	103	Eileen	1962	153	Sea Mew	1973
4 W	Stella	1937	54	Hycilla	1949	104	Spruce	1963	154	Sea Hawk	1973
**4 ***	**Ferga**	1958									
5	Celia	1937	**55**	**Ferdia II**	1949	**105**	**Ferdia III** (Skippy)	1962	155	Mayfly	1972
6	Daphne	1938/39	56	Cherie (Alverna)	1954	106	Tartara	1962	156	not allocated	
7	Ruby	1938/39	57	Lady Margaret(Eimear) (Aille)	1957	107	Hope	1941	157 W	Judy	1973
8	Minx (Eight)	1939	58	Celine (Careless / St. Brigid)	pre 1953?	108 B	Lorelei	1962	158	not allocated	
9	Mantis (Minthamme)	1939	59	Annette	1954	109	Trudy (Fly One)	1965	159	not allocated	
10 W	Tuano (Falcon)	1938	60	Sandra (not certified)	1951/52	110	Katie Girl (Juanita)	1963	160	Fenelda	1972
11	Oonagh	1937	61	Jan-Mari (Mimi)	1947	111	Perhaps	1963	161	Pearl	1973
12	Maybe (Nombril)	1939	62	Cliona	1950	112	Nualita	1964	162	Aisling	1974
13 *	Sparkie	1961	63	Zircon (Gem / A.E.)	1953	113	Una C.	1963	163	Tuskar	1973
14	Dabchick	1939	64	Charmian II	1953	**114**	**Nichapando**	1965	164	Gail (Engedi)	1974
15 B	Olga	1939	65	Orla (Linda)	1953	115	Philadelphis (Doreen)	pre 1953?	165	Sea Fox	1975
16 W	Saoirse (Jill)	1940?	66	Naiad	1953	116	Labasheeda (Andimica)	1955	166	Isadora	1975
16	Saoirse	?									
17	Meave	1940	67	Fifi	1954	117	Jane	1968	167 W	Jolene	1979
18	Clare (Nike, Claire)	1939	68	Laura	1953	118	not allocated		168	Aoibheann	?
19	Langeline (Christine)	1945	69	Trix	1953	119	Three Chevrons	1966	169	Shivona	1977
**20**	**Nereid**	1945	70	Dot	1956	120	Nicola	1963	170 W	Sheldrake II	1980
**21**	**Aideen**	1956	71 W	Jeannie	1960	**121**	Red Seal (Clodagh / **Cliona II**)	1963	171	C'est Ca	1979
22	Joy	1947	72	Sallywake	1953	122	Fionnuala	1964	172	Emma Anne	1982
23	Gipsy	1945	73	Lively Lady	1960	**123**	**Vee**	1965	173	Jubilee	1982
24	Mairead	1957	74	Biddy	1962	124	Meg	1964	174	Golden Chevrons	1983
25	Louise	1957	75	Brenda Marie (Marianne)	1961	125	Maid Marion	1963	175	Nora	1983
26	Thumbalina	1953	**76**	**Helen**	1960	**126**	**Dixie**	1964	176	Silver J	1983
27 W	Frances	1953	**77**	**Tiller Girl**	1960	127	not allocated		177	This Is It	1989
27 *	St Francis	1964									
28 W	Jacqueline	1956	78	Gigi	1962	128	Gina	1964	178	Bobby's Girl	2011
**29**	**Milk Wood**	1956	79 B	Kaye II	1959	129	Kilmoon	1966	179	Bean Adhmaid	1995
30	Elenora	1956	80 B	Jean	1953	130	Joanna Rose	1966	**180**	**Night Owl**	1995
31	Eva	1946	81	Rosalie	1953	**131**	**Wild Wind** (**Paula**)	1964	181	Kim	1989
**32**	**Elf**	1946	82	Margo	1953	132	Duotina	1965	182	Dolphin	1994
33	Ferdia	1946	83 W	Betsan	1953	133	Rebecca	1967	**183**	**Wannago**	1997
34	Sanderling (Joan)	1946	84	Nanno (Iduno)	1953	134	Jill	1967	184	Grace Dieu	1996
35	Nymph	1956	85	Akita	1953	**135**	**Cara II**	1967	185	The Message	1997
**36**	**Elizabeth**	1953	86	Marguerite	1954	136	Zayda II	1967	186	My Di	1997
37	Puffin (Cloud)	1953	**87 W**	Reckless (**Jessie**)	1960	137	Pandora	1968	**187**	**Zuleika**	1996
38	Syrena	1953	88	Kirkie May	1961	**138**	**Zeila**	1968	**188**	**Innocence**	1997
39	Trurvey (Lize)	1956	89	Realt na Mara	1961	139	not allocated		189	Azeezy	2003
40	Chargesheet (Seagull)	1957	90	Deirdre (Noka)	1955	140	Ariano	1969	190	Mayhem	2012
41	Mary C	1946	91	Penguin	1955	141	Alanna	1969	191	Maybe	2012
42	Carina (Stella Maris / Sari Maria)	1946	92	Grainne	1955	142 W	Aida (Dawn)	1969	192	Ariel	2012
43	Salome	1946	93	Swallow	1955	143	Barbecca	1969			
44	Sea Spray	1947	94	Hema	1955	144 W	Overdraught (Carefree)	1970			
45	Avril J	1950	95	Ingrid	1955	145 W	Capella	1968			
46	Argo	1953	96	Solace	1961	146	Fugitive	1968			
47	Sea Goon (Finnuala)	1960	97	Sybill	1961	147	Tijuana	1969			
48	Schuss (Rinn Slea)	1961	98 W	Breda	1962	148	Nimrod	1971			
49	Lady Joanne (Rosemary)	1960	99	Aoife	1960	149	Sí Gaoithe	1970			
50	Chico	1956	100	Zest (Patricia)	1962	150	Sea Wytch	1970			
