= Express cruiser =

An express cruiser is a fast cruising power boat. It is similar to a cabin cruiser, with a full head, galley, and sleeping space with two to six berths, distinguished from it by being more heavily powered and designed for speed.

Express cruisers range in size from 25 feet to 60 feet, characteristically have two powerful engines, and often large open areas near the steering area and in the back of the boat.

An express cruiser does not usually have a flying bridge.
