= Oyster Wars =

Series of disputes over oyster harvesting in Maryland and Virginia

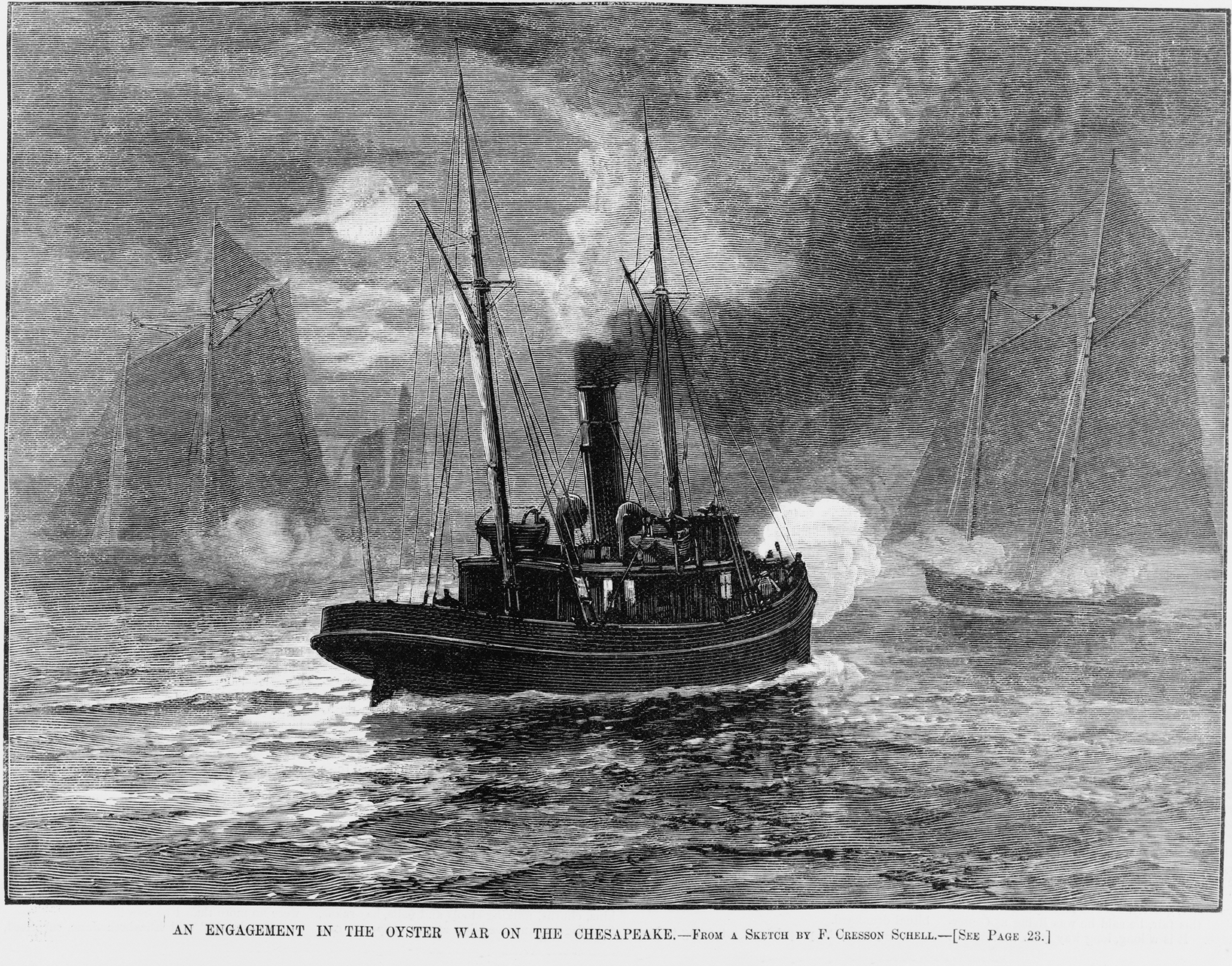
- Oyster War engagement in 1886
- Date: 1865–1959
- Location: Chesapeake Bay; Potomac River

Parties
Oyster pirates New England fishermen	Legal watermen United States: Maryland; Virginia

Casualties and losses
Unknown deaths and arrests	Unknown deaths

The Oyster Wars were a series of sometimes violent disputes between oyster pirates and authorities and legal watermen from Maryland and Virginia in the waters of the Chesapeake Bay and the Potomac River from 1865 until about 1959.

== Background ==
In 1830, the Maryland General Assembly passed legislation which authorized only state residents to harvest oysters in its waters. Maryland outlawed dredging, while Virginia continued to allow it until 1879. In 1865, the Maryland General Assembly passed a law that required annual permits for oyster harvesting and this has been described as the start of the Oyster Wars.

== Clashes ==
After the Civil War, the oyster harvesting industry boomed. In the 1880s, the Chesapeake Bay was the source of almost half of the world's supply of oysters. New England fishermen encroached on the Bay after their local oyster beds had been exhausted, which prompted violent clashes with local fishermen from Maryland and Virginia. Watermen from different counties likewise clashed.

== Government responses ==
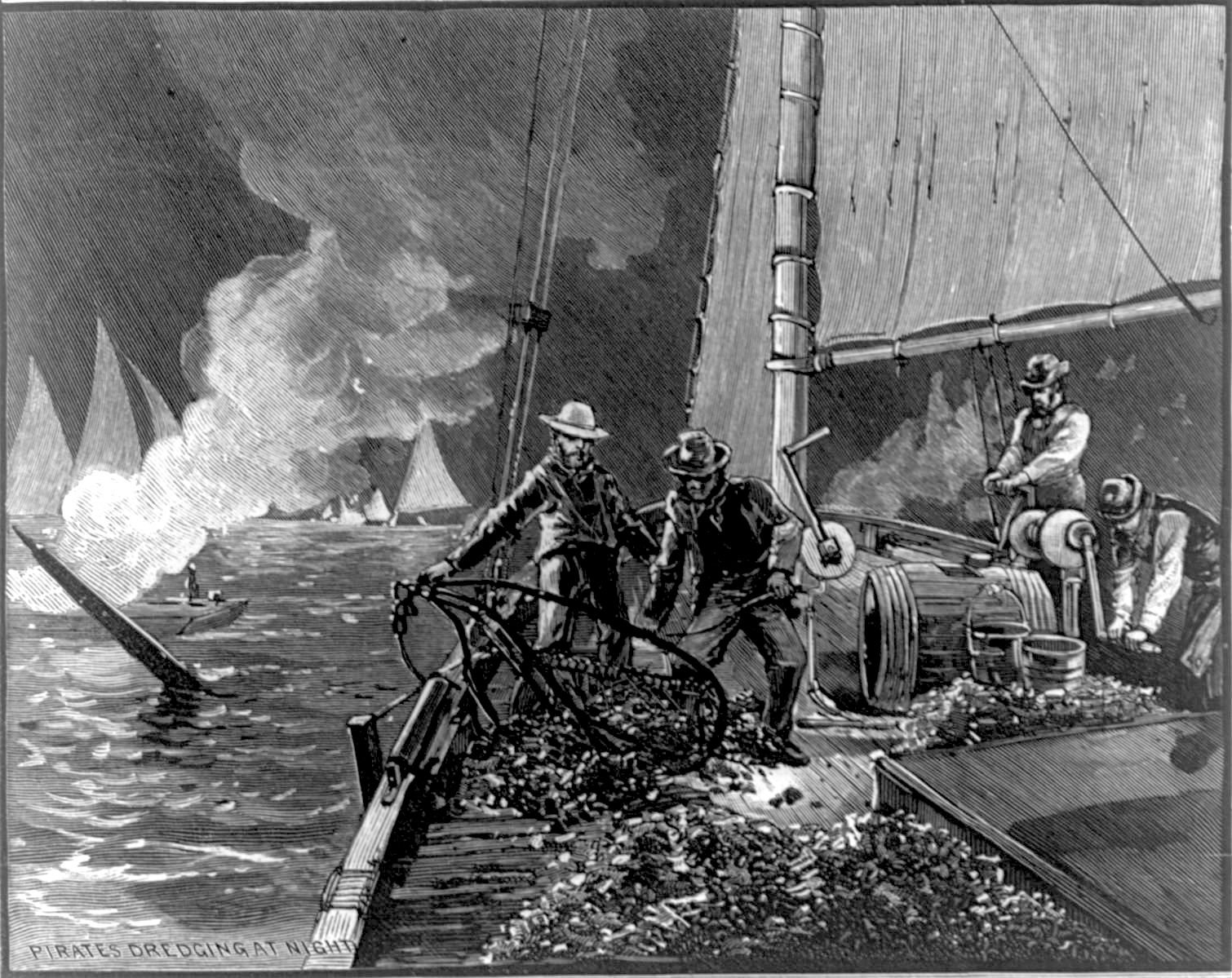
Oyster pirates in 1884. Part of the Library of Congress notation is "Ships Julia Hamilton" though the drawing features "pirate" night dredgers.

=== Maryland ===
In 1868, Maryland founded the Maryland Oyster Police Force, nicknamed the Oyster Navy, which was the predecessor of the modern Maryland Natural Resources Police. It was headed by Naval Academy graduate Hunter Davidson and was responsible for enforcing the state's oyster-harvesting laws, but it was an inadequate force to compete with the more heavily armed watermen.

=== Virginia ===
Virginia made its own attempts to fight illegal oystering. In the 1870s, Virginia imposed license fees, seasonal limits, and other measures to prevent over harvesting and preserve the oyster population. However, the cash-strapped commonwealth had limited enforcement capabilities—especially after it sold its three-vessel maritime police fleet at auction. After violence broke out between oyster tongers, individual small boat oystermen using hand held tongs to collect oysters, and more affluent oyster dredgers, Virginia banned oyster dredging in 1879.

When armed and organized dredgers, many from Maryland, violated the ban, Virginia Governor William E. Cameron found an opportunity to boost his popularity by taking on the pirates. Cameron personally led an expedition against the illegal dredgers. On February 17, 1882, Cameron's force, consisting of the tugboat Victoria J. Peed and the freighter Louisa, engaged pirates at the mouth of the Rappahannock River. The governor's raid resulted in the successful convictions of 41 dredgers and the forfeiture of seven boats. The raid represented the high point of the governor's term.

When Cameron's popularity sank and dredgers returned to the bay, the governor undertook a second expedition. Cameron once again used the Peed but the steamer Pamlico became his flagship. Cameron's second expedition was not very successful. Captured dredgers were acquitted or escaped indictment in court. The opposition press also mocked the governor for failing to capture the Dancing Molly, a sloop run by three women who managed to outrun the governor's ships. The Norfolk Academy of Music lampooned the governor's expedition in an April 1883 comic opera, Driven from the Seas: or, The Pirate Dredger's Doom. In 1884, Cameron established the "Board on the Chesapeake and its Tributaries," which led to improved law enforcement and better fishery management.

In 1959, the Potomac River Fisheries Commissioner H. C. Byrd ordered the fisheries police disarmed after an officer killed a Virginia waterman who was illegally dredging. The move was credited with bringing an end to the violent conflicts.

== See also ==
- Governor R. M. McLane (steamboat)
- Julia Hamilton
- Sheep Wars
- The Oyster Question: Scientists, Watermen, and the Maryland Chesapeake Bay since 1880
- Albert W. Hicks (Who pirated an oyster sloop traveling from New York to Virginia)
