= Chance Boatyard =

Historic buildings in Maryland, US

- U.S. National Register of Historic Places
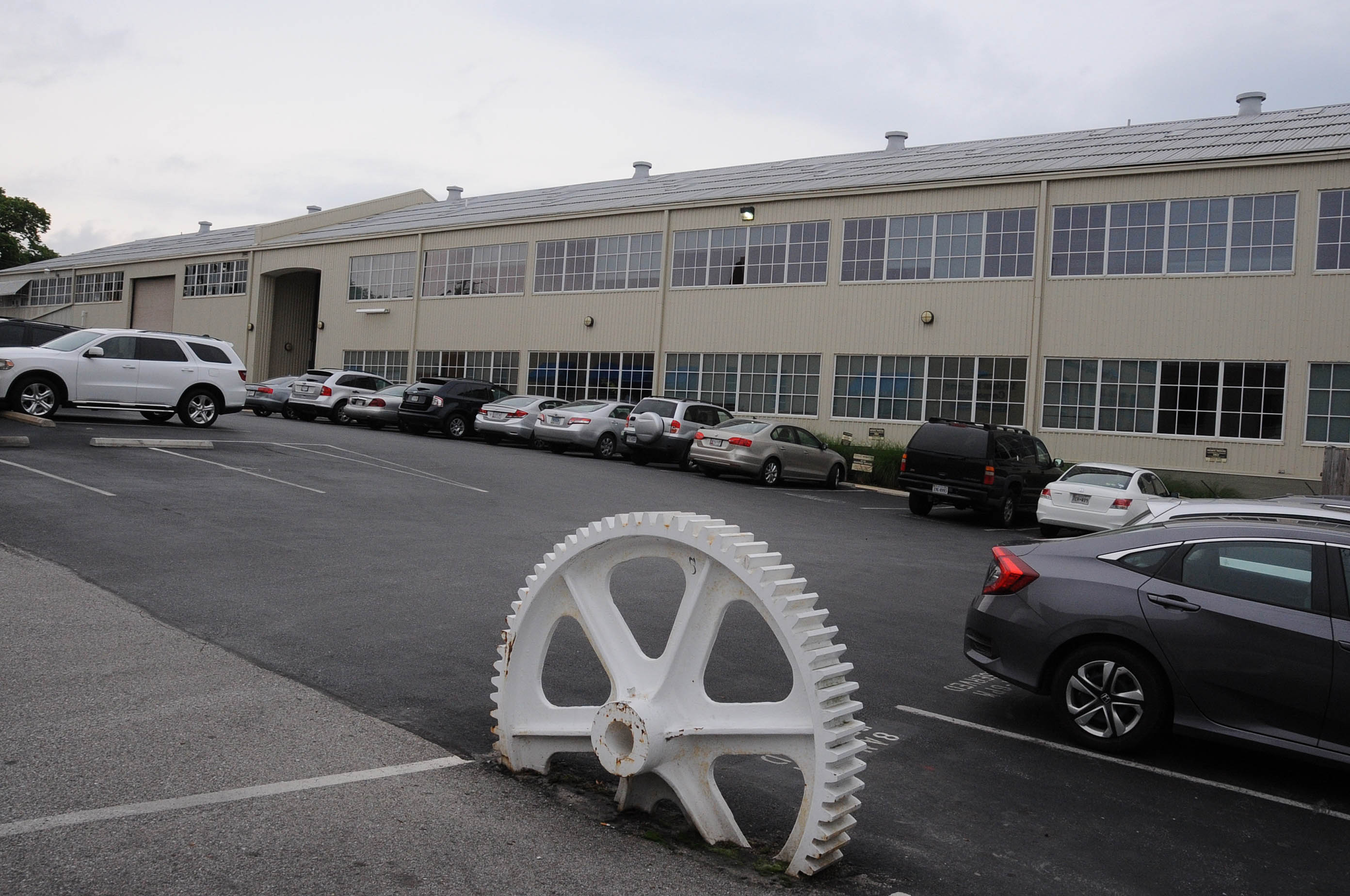
- Main building

- Location within Maryland Location within the United States
- Location: 222 Severn Ave., Annapolis, Maryland
- Coordinates: 38°58′22″N 76°28′54″W
- Built: 1913
- Architect: Harold M. Simmons
- NRHP reference No.: 99000421
- Added to NRHP: April 14, 1999

Chance Boatyard is a group of historic buildings at Annapolis, Anne Arundel County, Maryland. It used to be a boat-building and repair complex. Most of the buildings were built between 1913 and 1942 to support the boat-building and repair activity of Chance Marine Construction Corporation and its successors, Annapolis Yacht Yard and John Trumpy & Sons.

It was listed on the National Register of Historic Places in 1999.

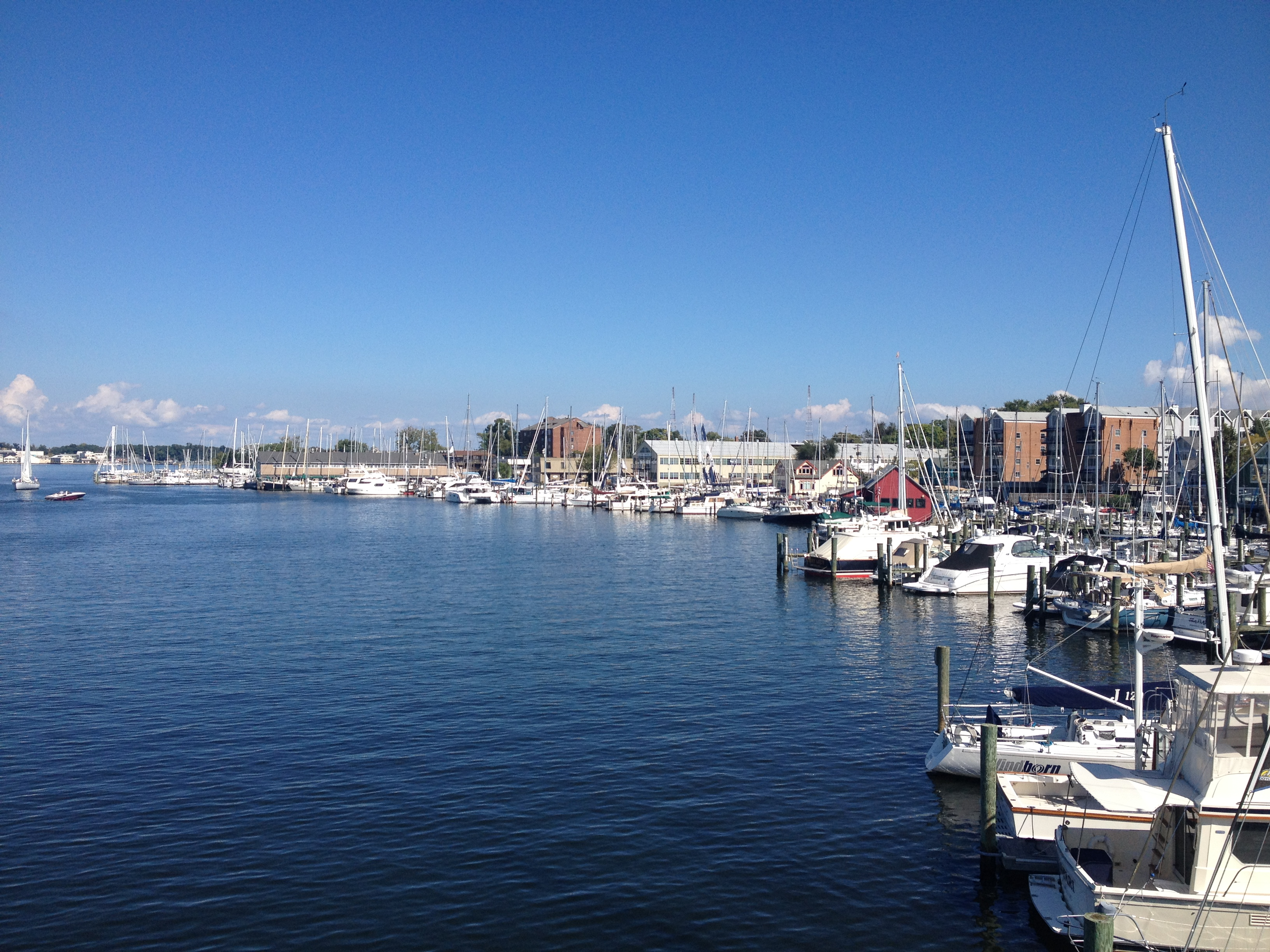
View from Compromise Street Bridge

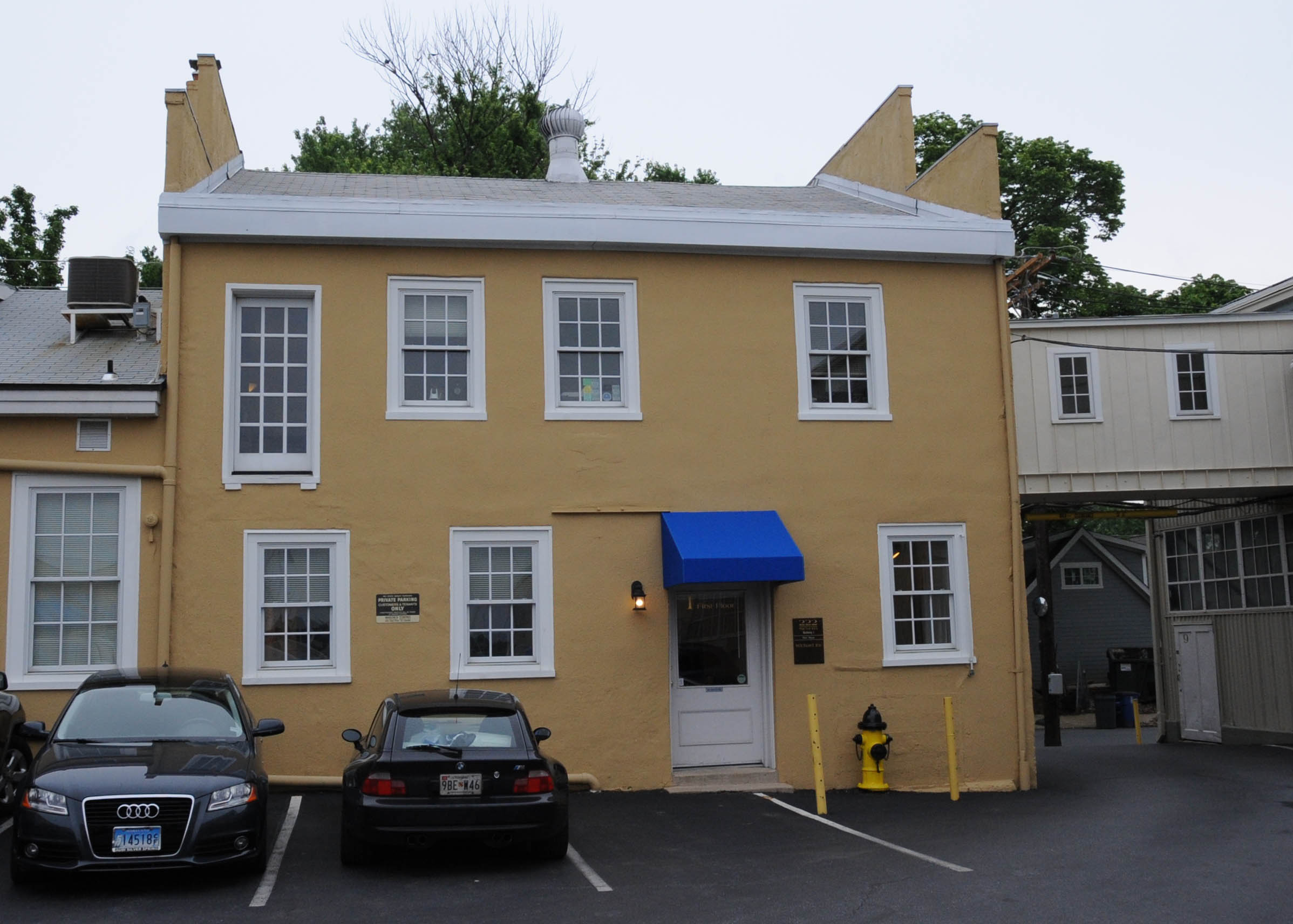
Older building
