= Oyster pirate =

Persons who engage in the poaching of oysters

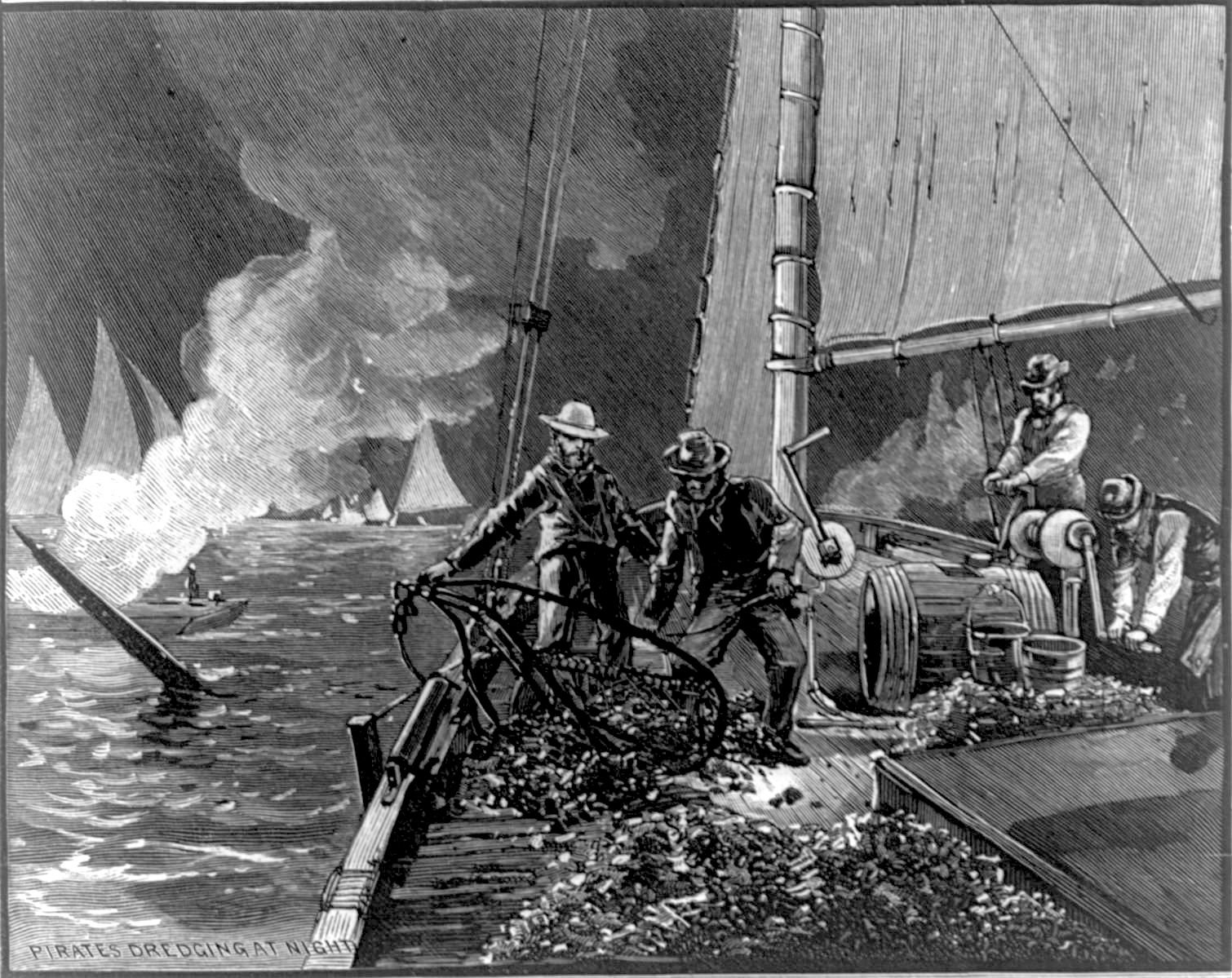
Oyster pirates on the Chesapeake Bay in 1884

An oyster pirate is a person who poaches oysters. It was a term that became popular on both the West Coast of the United States and the East Coast of the United States during the 19th century.

== San Francisco Bay oyster pirates ==
In the 1880s, while San Francisco Bay had populations of native oysters, they were never very abundant. By the early 1850s, entrepreneurs began importing oysters from Shoalwater Bay (now Willapa Bay), Washington Territory. Native West coast oysters were much smaller and had a different flavor from those from the East coast. When the transcontinental railroad was completed, large fishery companies in the east sold juvenile oysters to San Francisco entrepreneurs who purchased submerged land from the State of California and grew oysters from transplanted Eastern stock.

By the late 1880s a handful of competing oyster companies began consolidating into a single monopoly. Their harvest of a private commodity from a public space, the San Francisco Bay, led to an opportunity for oyster pirates. Pirates raided the oyster beds at night and sold their take in the Oakland markets in the morning. The public disliked the Southern Pacific and the oyster growers, and liked cheap oysters. As a result, the oyster pirates had considerable public sympathy and police were reluctant to take action against them.

== East Coast and Chesapeake Bay oyster pirates ==
Oyster pirates also operated on the east coast of the United States beginning in the 18th century. These disputes often focused on increased privatization of what had been public rights, providing an obvious inspiration for later West Coast activities. Oyster pirates also appeared in the Chesapeake Bay, especially from the second half of the nineteenth century into the twentieth century during the Oyster Wars.

== See also ==
- Oyster Wars
- San Leandro Oyster Beds
- Albert W. Hicks (New York Oyster Pirate)
