= Maryland Natural Resources Police =

Law enforcement arm of the Maryland Department of Natural Resources (DNR)

- MDNRP patch

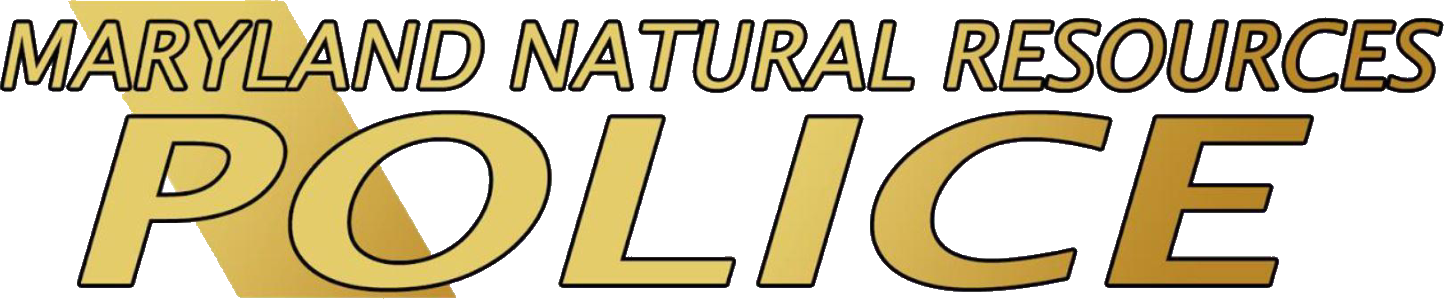
- Wordmark
- Abbreviation: NRP

Agency overview
- Formed: 1868
- Preceding agencies: State Oyster Police Force; State Fishery Force; Office of the State Game Warden; Conservation Commission

Jurisdictional structure
- Operations jurisdiction: Maryland, U.S.
- General nature: Civilian police

Operational structure
- Headquarters: Annapolis, Maryland, U.S.
- NRP Officers: 269
- Civilian employees: 78
- Agency executive: Col. Orlando Lilly, Superintendent

Website
- https://dnr.maryland.gov/nrp/Pages/default.aspx

The Maryland Natural Resources Police (NRP) is the law enforcement arm of the Maryland Department of Natural Resources (DNR), tasked with enforcing laws on the state's public lands and waterways, protecting fish and wildlife, and leading search and rescue efforts. The Natural Resources Police is also the state's maritime homeland security agency; it is Maryland's oldest state-level law enforcement agency.

Natural Resources Police officers are the only state law enforcement officers to have full statewide jurisdiction, including Baltimore City. The Maryland State Police (MSP), the state police and highway patrol, also has statewide jurisdiction, but has limited authority within incorporated cities. NRP officers enforce the Maryland Natural Resources Code as well as the Criminal Code and Transportation Code.

As of October 2020, the force has 269 sworn personnel and 78 civilian employees.

== Organization ==
The superintendent's position (chief of police) is Col. Orlando Lilly.

The DNR is divided into four regions:

- Western: Garrett, Allegany, Washington, and Frederick counties
- Central: Montgomery, Howard, Carroll, Harford, Cecil counties, Baltimore County and Baltimore City
- Southern: Anne Arundel, Prince George's, Calvert, Charles, and St. Mary's counties
- Eastern: Kent, Queen Anne's, Caroline, Talbot, Dorchester, Somerset, Wicomico, and Worcester counties

The NRP has its headquarters in the state capital, Annapolis.

== Bureaus ==
The Maryland Natural Resources Police have five operational bureaus:

- Field Operations Bureau: Responsible for regular enforcement, call to service
- Support Services Bureau: Training, Recruitment and Safety Education Division, Communications and Supply Division
- Special Operations Bureau: Criminal Investigations Section, Aviation Section, Response Team Section (K-9 unit, Tactical Response Team, Tactical Boat Operators Team, Underwater Operations Team, Tactical Emergency Medical Support Team), Drug Enforcement Unit, HIDTA, Homeland Security and Intelligence Section
- Intelligence and Special Investigations Bureau: Internal Affairs Unit, Task Force Section, MLEIN (Maritime Law Enforcement Information Network) Program
- Administrative Services Bureau: NRP Human Resources, Personal Support, Fiscal Support General Direction and Field Operations

== Authority and Training ==
The NRP have statewide authority to enforce all laws, including the Natural Resources Article, the Criminal Law Article, and the Transportation Article.

The Maryland Natural Resources Police Training Academy, the agency police academy, is located in Sykesville, Maryland at the Maryland Police and Correctional Training Commission. The academy officially opened on March 25, 1963, as the Maryland State Marine Police Academy, with a class of eight officers.

== History ==
The NRP is Maryland's oldest state law enforcement agency and fourth oldest state conservation law enforcement agency in the United States.

The NRP traces its lineage to an act of the Maryland General Assembly in 1868 creating the State Oyster Police Force in order to enforce 1830 and 1865 laws regulating oyster-harvesting and conservation. This force's responsibility was limited to enforcing the oyster laws on the Chesapeake Bay. Hunter Davidson, a former Confederate States Navy officer and U.S. Naval Academy graduate, was unanimously chosen as the first commander of the State Oyster Police Force by the State Board of Commissioners. Davidson acquired a 12-pounder Dahlgren howitzer for the force's first steamer, Leila, for use in the gun battles between the Oyster Police and the illegal dredgers.

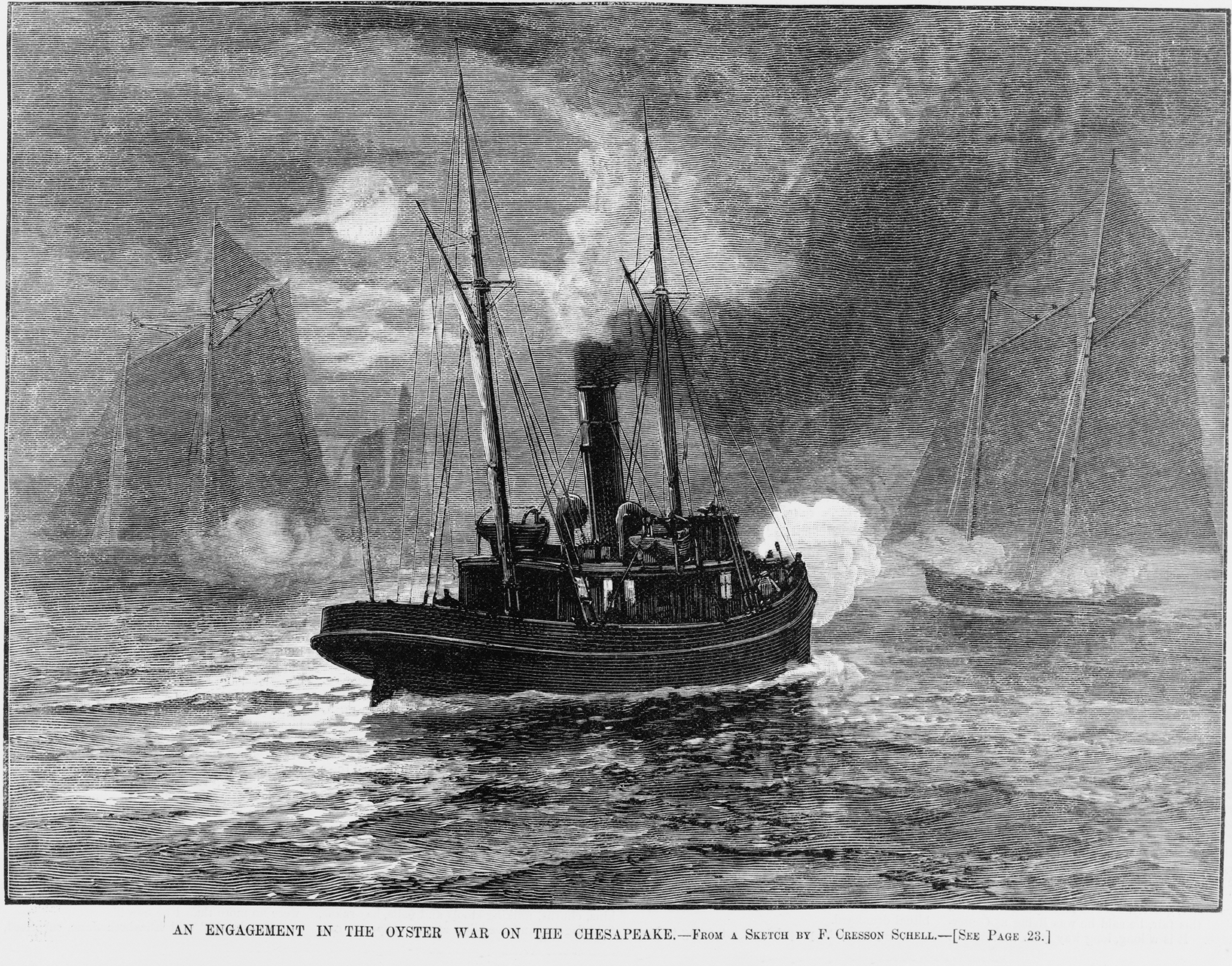
Engagement in the oyster war on the Chesapeake, 1886.

During the early years the force, nicknamed the Oyster Navy, was engaged in suppressing oyster poaching by out of state boats and locals described as "oyster pirates." During these Oyster Wars the force had a fleet, largely of schooners such as Julia Hamilton but included armed steamers. The first steamer, Leila, was replaced by two built for the purpose, Governor R. M. McLane and Governor P. F. Thomas. Governor R. M. McLane is known to have had a 12-pounder Dahlgren howitzer. Lt. Gregory Bartles of the Maryland Natural Resources Police believes that gun to have been transferred from Leila. The gun was acquired for eventual museum display by Maryland with funds from a donor matched by funds from the Department of Natural Resources Secretary.

In 1874, the state created a Commission of Fisheries to study and report on the status of Maryland fisheries; the State Oyster Police Force was renamed the State Fishery Force and placed under the jurisdiction of the commission. In 1890, the state enacted its first uniform natural resources conservation law for the protection of game birds and animals. In 1896, the General Assembly established the Office of the State Game Warden, headed by a state game warden appointed by the governor for a two-year term; Governor Lloyd Lowndes Jr. appointed Robert H. Gilbert to the post.

In 1916, the Conservation Commission was created by combining the State Fisheries Force and the Office of the State Game Warden; the General Assembly provided that the commission could appoint the state game warden. The Commission selected as its first appointment E. Lee LeCompte of Dorchester County, who served until 1945.

Shortly after the nation's entry into World War I the Navy proposed that the State Fishery Force boats and personnel be used to maintain constant local patrols. The state legislature agreed that the boats and men of the state force would become part of the U.S. Naval Reserve providing they patrol the same districts for fisheries enforcement as well as federal interests with the benefit that patrol time would be increased and the expense for all be paid by the federal government. The vessels, some in commissioned status, served into 1918 in that dual role. In 1918, the first statewide hunting license law was enacted, and in 1927, the first resident and nonresident angler's license law was enacted.

In 2005, the Maryland DNR consolidated the law enforcement function of the Maryland Park Service's state park rangers (known as Maryland Rangers) into the Natural Resources Police, and many of the Maryland Rangers became NRP officers. The NRP's mission expanded to include law enforcement duties for the state's parks, forests, and other lands managed by the DNR. Maryland Park Service managers who had law enforcement responsibilities before the merger retained their law enforcement commissions and continued to be called Maryland Rangers. The park service hired non-law enforcement personnel, also to be referred to as rangers, to take over the non-law enforcement duties previously performed by the Maryland Rangers.

== Special Operations Division ==
The Criminal Investigations Section is responsible for all in-depth criminal investigations and death investigation that fall under the jurisdiction of the NRP which includes major felony marine thefts, fatal boating accidents and hunting accidents.

The purpose of the Aviation Section is to provide aerial support dedicated to conservation, and boating law enforcement activities, this may also include but is not limited to Search and Rescue, Homeland Security, or other law enforcement activities as needed.

The purpose of the Response Team Section is to provide ancillary support within the Agency as needed in specialized/focused areas such as:

- K-9 Team: The primary purpose of the Canine Team Unit is to provide specialized resources (canines) to assist field officers, allied agencies, and the citizens of the state with specialized capabilities in support of the Department's mission.
- Tactical Response team: The purpose the Tactical Response Team (TRT) will serve as the primary resource to assist in the coordination of land-based search and rescue missions, and tactical operations for the Maryland Natural Resources Police. The TRT will provide specialized services in support of Agency, as well as allied agency operations.
- Tactical Boat Operators Team: The NRP Tactical Boat Operators (TBOs) Team are NRP officers that have been specifically chosen due to their knowledge in the marine environment and experience in vessel operations that they possess. TBO's can be utilized in special details including; heightened alerts in and around Critical Infrastructure, safety and security zone enforcement, as well as special events, and can be utilized on special missions in which the NRP TRT may need to be deployed in the maritime environment. TBO's will be assigned on a temporary basis as needed to deliver the TRT or allied agency tactical teams during maritime missions and other pre-planned assignments.
- Underwater Operations Team: The purpose of the UOT is to assist field officers with specialized dive related services in recovery operations. The UOT can provide the following specialized services; Body recovery, Evidence Recovery, Investigations, Maintenance, or Side Scan Sonar Operations.
- Tactical Emergency Medical Support Team (TEMS): The purpose of the TEMS Team is to assist the field force, support services, SOD, and allied agencies with trained personnel to provide emergency medical support for high-risk police operations, training, and special assignments. At a minimum, TEMS team members shall be certified EMT-B (Maryland Emergency Medical Technician-Basic)

The Homeland Security & Intelligence Section coordinates and assists in the evaluation of NRP's capabilities, weaknesses in resources, personnel, training and current policies in relationship to identified Homeland Security targets and issues. The unit works with tasks forces and other groups, such as the Maryland Coordination and Analysis Center (MCAC) and the Anti-Terrorism Advisory Council (ATAC) of Maryland. The MLEIN Program monitors radar units and cameras stationed throughout the Chesapeake Bay region.

== Non-Law Enforcement Programs ==
=== Cadet Program ===
The Natural Resources Police Cadet position provides young adults who are not yet eligible to apply to become Natural Resources Police Officers an opportunity to learn and be exposed to all facets of the job as a prospective future Natural Resources Police Officer. Young Adults ages 18–20 are trained in preparation for a career as an NRP Officer. After 3.5 weeks of formal training, Cadets will be given the opportunity to patrol with NRP officers. Cadets will also work in other jurisdictions of the Department of Natural Resources, including State Park Service, Fisheries, DNR Communications, Headquarters, Forestry Service, NRP Academy, and investigations.

=== Reserve Officer Program ===
Reserve Officers are non-sworn officer volunteers who provide various types of support, education, training and public relations functions for the NRP.

== Ranks and Insignia ==
Non-Commissioned Officer Ranks

- Officer, No rank insignia
- Officer First Class, One chevron
- Senior Officer, One chevron with rocker attached below
- Master Officer, One chevron with rocker attached below, and a diamond center
- Corporal, Two chevrons
- Sergeant, Three chevrons

Commissioned Officer Ranks

- Lieutenant, Single silver bar
- Captain, Double silver bar
- Major, Gold Oak Leaf
- Lieutenant Colonel, Silver oak leaf
- Colonel, Silver Eagle

== Weapons and equipment ==
Officers are issued the Smith & Wesson M&P 40 Full Size, in .40 caliber. NRP Officers may be allowed to carry personally owned firearms provided the firearm is inspected, approved, and chambered in a certain caliber. Officers are issued the Safariland Model 6365 holsters along with a double magazine pouch for wear on the duty belt.

Officers in a patrol function may be issued patrol rifles and shotguns. Officers are issued AR-15 riles chambered in 5.56×45mm and Remington Model 870 shotguns chambered in 12 gauge. Patrol rifles and shotguns are carried in the locking carriers of patrol vehicles and vessels.

Non-Commissioned officers, in addition to sidearm and magazines, carry the following on the Duty Belt; Handcuffs, OC pepper spray, expandable baton, personally owned flashlights, and portable radio holster.

NRP officers in a patrol function are issued 4x4 police pickup trucks. The NRP fleet utilizes Ford, Chevrolet and Dodge Ram pickup trucks. Marked patrol trucks are black with yellow lettering identifying the agency and the agency emblem with NRP plates. Unmarked vehicles have regular MVA tags. Vehicles are equipped with emergency lights, sirens, police radios, and computer docking stations.

Vessels utilized by the agency include the Everglades 243cc, Metal Shark Boats 29 Defiant, and Metal Shark Boats 38 Defiant. Other vessel manufacturers include Boston Whaler, Brunswick Government and Commercial Products, Sea Ark, Zodiac boat and more. Patrol vessels are equipped with blue lights, sirens, VHF and police radios, computer docking stations and Garmin navigation systems.

=== Uniforms ===
- Class A: Green dress blouse, collar ornaments, badge, nameplate, commendations, long sleeve shirt, necktie, winter trousers, felt Stetson, and black oxford or black high-gloss dress shoes only. This uniform shall be designated as the dress uniform.
- Class B: Winter trousers, long sleeve shirt, tie, felt Stetson, and weapons belt. This uniform shall be worn during the winter months (November 1 through March 31), and is to be utilized for most routine duties.
- Class C: Summer trousers, short sleeve shirt, straw Stetson, and weapons belt. This uniform shall be worn during the summer months (May 16 through September 14) and is to be utilized for most routine duties.
- Class D: (Utility Uniform) – Utility trousers, long sleeve, or short sleeve utility shirt, baseball style type cap, and web style weapons belt.
- Class E: (Civilian Business Attire) – This attire may be worn when working in an investigative unit, attending meetings, training, or special assignments.
- Class F: (Drill Instructor Uniform) – May only be worn by certified Drill Instructors and only within the NRP Training Academy environment or as authorized by the Training and Recruitment Unit Commander.

== See also ==
- List of law enforcement agencies in Maryland
