= Swan (Motorboat) =

History

United States
- Name: Swan
- Namesake: Previous name retained
- Acquired: 17 August 1917
- Commissioned: Never
- Stricken: April 1918
- Fate: Sold in 1920 for $190
- Notes: Never placed in U.S. Navy service

General characteristics
- Type: Patrol vessel (proposed)
- Length: 41 ft 0 in (12.50 m)
- Beam: 8 ft 6 in (2.59 m)
- Draft: 2 ft 6 in (0.76 m) (mean)
- Speed: 10 miles per hour (8.7 kn) (Note: DANFS] states MPH rather than knots.)

Swan was a Conservation Commission of Maryland motorboat.

The United States Navy approached the Conservation Commission shortly after the nation's entry into World War I proposing the commission's boats be used to maintain constant local patrols. The state legislature agreed that the boats and men of the state force would become part of the U.S. Naval Reserve providing they patrol the same districts for fisheries enforcement as well as federal interests with the benefit that patrol time would be increased and the expense for all be paid by the federal government. Swan was thus acquired by the U.S. Navy on 17 August 1917 for section patrol duty in the 5th Naval District during World War I. The boat was apparently never commissioned or placed in service and was stricken from the Navy List in April 1918 and subsequently returned to the Conservation Commission. (Note: Under terms of the agreement the Commission would maintain use of the boat throughout so that "return" is probably inaccurate.)

Swan was sold in 1920 for $190 with receipts put into the commission's Purchasing and Refitting Account.
