= USS Nellie Jackson =

Patrol vessel of the United States Navy

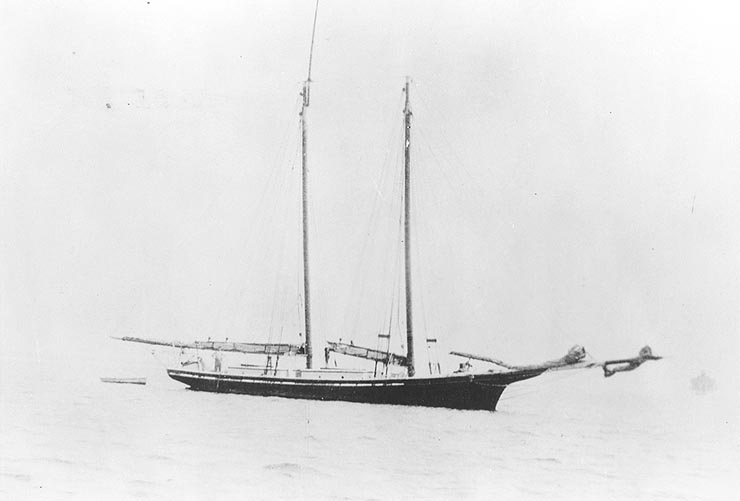
- Nellie Jackson as a civilian schooner sometime between 1896 and 1917.

History

United States
- Name: USS Nellie Jackson
- Namesake: Previous name retained
- Builder: J. W. Brooks, Maryland
- Completed: 1896
- Acquired: 24 August 1917
- Commissioned: 1917
- Decommissioned: 26 November 1918
- Fate: Returned to owner 26 November 1918
- Notes: Operated as civilian schooner Nellie Jackson 1896-1917 and from 1918

General characteristics
- Type: Patrol vessel
- Length: 55 ft (17 m) or 62 ft 0 in (18.90 m)
- Beam: 20 ft 0 in (6.10 m)
- Draft: 4 ft 9 in (1.45 m)
- Propulsion: Sails and steam engine, one shaft

USS Nellie Jackson (SP-1459) was a United States Navy patrol vessel in commission from 1917 to 1918.

Nellie Jackson was built as a civilian two-masted sail-and-steam schooner of the same name in 1896 by J. W. Brooks in Maryland. On 24 August 1917, the U.S. Navy acquired her from her owner, the Conservation Commission of Maryland, for use as a section patrol boat during World War I. She was commissioned as USS Nellie Jackson (SP-1459).

Nellie Jackson served on patrol duties, presumably in the Chesapeake Bay area, for the rest of World War I. She was decommissioned on 26 November 1918, and the Navy returned her to the Conservation Commission the same day.
