= USS Dorothy =

Patrol vessel of the United States Navy

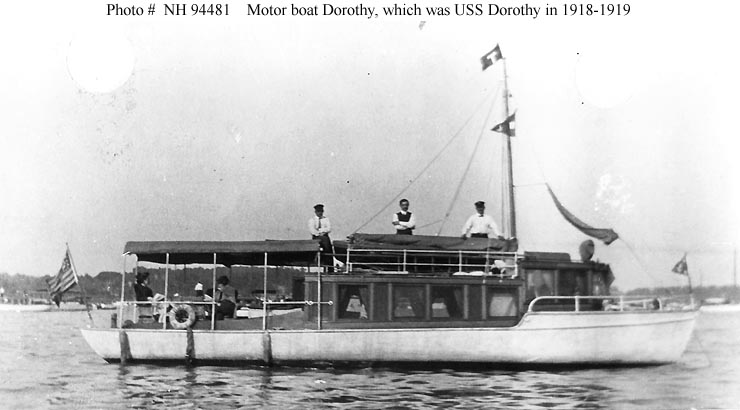
- Dorothy as a civilian motorboat sometime between 1911 and 1917.

History

United States
- Name: USS Dorothy
- Namesake: Previous name retained
- Completed: 1911
- Acquired: 17 August 1917
- Commissioned: by 13 September 1917
- Decommissioned: 27 November 1918
- Fate: Returned to owner 24 September or 27 November 1918
- Notes: Operated as civilian motorboat Dorothy 1911-1917 and from 1918

General characteristics
- Type: Patrol vessel
- Length: 41 ft (12 m)

USS Dorothy (SP-1289) was a United States Navy patrol vessel in commission from 1917 to 1918.

Dorothy was built as a civilian motorboat of the same name in 1911. On 17 August 1917, the U.S. Navy acquired her from her owner, the Conservation Commission of Maryland, for use as a section patrol boat during World War I. She was commissioned as USS Dorothy (SP-1289) and was reported as being "already in service" on 13 September 1917.

Assigned to the 5th Naval District, Dorothy served on patrol duties in the Maryland and Virginia area.

The Navy returned Dorothy to the Conservation Commission on either 24 September or 27 November 1918.
