= USS Helen Baughman =

Patrol vessel of the United States Navy

History

United States
- Name: USS Helen Baughman
- Namesake: Previous name retained
- Builder: Bowns, Nanticoke, Maryland
- Completed: 1894
- Acquired: August 1917
- Commissioned: 1917
- Fate: Returned to owner 27 November 1918
- Notes: Operated as civilian schooner Helen Baughman 1894-1917 and from 1918

General characteristics
- Type: Patrol vessel
- Displacement: 50 tons
- Length: 66 ft 8 in (20.32 m)
- Beam: 18 ft 6 in (5.64 m)
- Draft: 4 ft 9 in (1.45 m)

USS Helen Baughman (SP-1292) was a United States Navy patrol vessel in commission from 1917 to 1918.

Helen Baughman was built as a civilian schooner of the same name in 1894 by Bowns at Nanticoke, Maryland. In August 1917, the U.S. Navy acquired her from her owner, the Maryland State Conservation Commission, for use as a section patrol boat during World War I. She was commissioned as USS Helen Baughman (SP-1292).

Assigned to the 5th Naval District and based at Deale, Maryland, Helen Baughman served on patrol duties on the Chesapeake Bay for the rest of World War I, cruising Herring Bay, Tangier Sound, and surrounding areas.

The Navy returned Helen Baughman to the Conservation Commission on 27 November 1918.
