= USS Buck (SP-1355) =

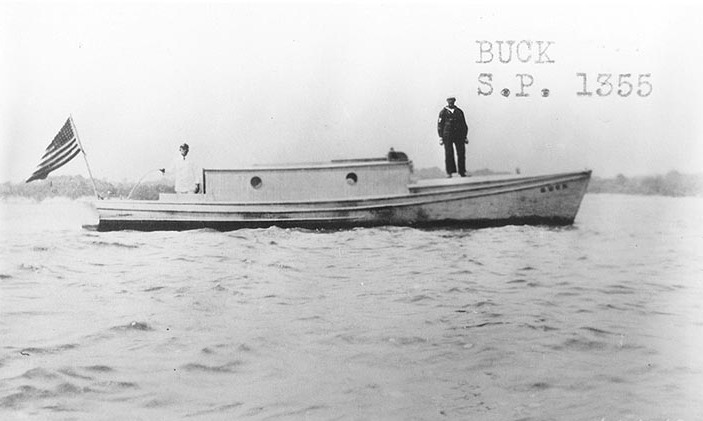
- USS Buck (SP-1355), later USS SP-1355, during World War I.

History

United States
- Name: USS Buck (September 1917 – April 1918); USS SP-1355 (April 1918-late 1918)
- Namesake: As Buck, her previous name retained; As SP-1355, her section patrol number
- Completed: 1911
- Acquired: 24 August 1917
- Commissioned: 13 September 1917
- Decommissioned: Late 1918
- Fate: Returned to owner 24 September 1918 or 27 November 1918

General characteristics
- Type: Tender
- Length: 33 ft 6 in (10.21 m)
- Beam: 7 ft 6 in (2.29 m)
- Draft: 1 ft 6 in (0.46 m) (aft)
- Speed: 15 miles per hour
- Complement: 2

The first USS Buck (SP-1355), later USS SP-1355, was a tender that served in the United States Navy from 1917 to 1918.

Buck was built as a civilian motorboat in 1911. On 24 August 1917, the U.S. Navy acquired her under a free lease from the Conservation Commission of Maryland for use during World War I. She was commissioned as USS Buck (SP-1355) on 13 September 1917.

Assigned to the 5th Naval District, Buck served as a tender at Norfolk, Virginia, for the remainder of World War I. She was renamed USS SP-1355 in April 1918.

SP-1355 was decommissioned late in 1918. The navy returned her to Conservation Commission of Maryland on either 24 September 1918 or 27 November 1918.
