= Oyster farming =

Commercial growing of oysters

Oyster farming is an aquaculture (or mariculture) practice in which oysters are bred and raised mainly for their pearls, shells and inner organ tissue, which is eaten. Oyster farming was practiced by the ancient Romans as early as the 1st century BC on the Italian Peninsula and later in Britain for export to Rome. The French oyster industry has relied on aquacultured oysters since the late 18th century.

== History ==
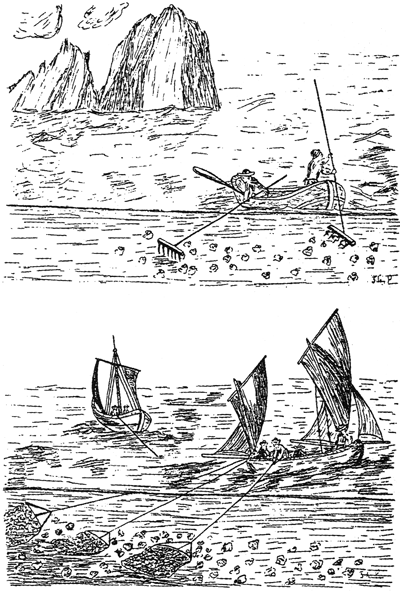
Oyster harvesting using rakes (top) and sail driven dredges (bottom). From L'Encyclopédie of 1771

Oyster farming was practiced by the ancient Romans as early as the 1st century BC on the Italian peninsula. With the Barbarian invasions the oyster farming in the Mediterranean and the Atlantic came to an end.

In fact, the Romans were the very first to cultivate Oysters. The Roman engineer Sergius Orata is known for his innovative ways of breeding and commercializing oysters. He did this by cultivating the mollusk with a system that could control the water levels.

In 1852 Monsieur de Bon started to re-seed the oyster beds by collecting the oyster spawn using makeshift catchers. An important step to the modern oyster farming was the oyster farm built by Hyacinthe Boeuf in the Ile de Ré. After obtaining the rights to a part of the coast he built a wall to make a reservoir and to break the strength of the current. Some time later the wall was covered with spat coming spontaneously from the sea which gave 2000 baby oysters per square metre.

The Ancient Romans started farming the Thames Estuary in Hampton-On-Sea, or Kent, England from the 1st Century to approximately the 4th Century. They would export the oysters back to Rome and throughout the Roman Empire. On July 25, 1864, The Herne Bay Hampton and Recuiver Oyster Fishery Company moved into the area to start oyster farming. In the 1870s the oyster trade suffered from overfishing and sent the industry into a decline. This caused the government of the United Kingdom to pass the 1877 Act to solve the problem. This act prevented the sale of dredged oysters from the months of June through August, and freshwater pond oyster sales from between May and August. A couple of years later the company closed its doors and all the assets were sold by 1881, closing the oyster farming in the Thames Estuary area in England.

Another place in England that is famous for its oyster fishing is Whitstable. The area's "kentish flats" have been used since the Romans started. The oysters would get shipped to Italy, where Roman Emperors would pay for them by their weight in gold.

Outside Europe, oysters were also a prized ingredient in China. Notably, Teng pioneers settling along the coast of Laufaushan obtained the right from the Chinese government to collect rent on the oyster beds established there from 1667 to 1909. Due to the Cantonese ethnozoological system classifying oysters as a plant, the commodity remained Laufaushan's primary product during recessions and religious observances prescribing vegetarianism. One of the primary drivers of oyster demand was oyster sauce. Supposedly discovered on accident by Lee Kum Sheung (founder of the brand Lee Kum Kee) in 1888, the product has gone on to become a staple of Cantonese cuisine that is accessible worldwide.

== Varieties of farmed oysters ==
Commonly farmed food oysters include the Eastern oyster Crassostrea virginica, the Pacific oyster Crassostrea gigas, Belon oyster Ostrea edulis, the Sydney rock oyster Saccostrea glomerata, and the Southern mud oyster Ostrea angasi.

== Cultivation ==
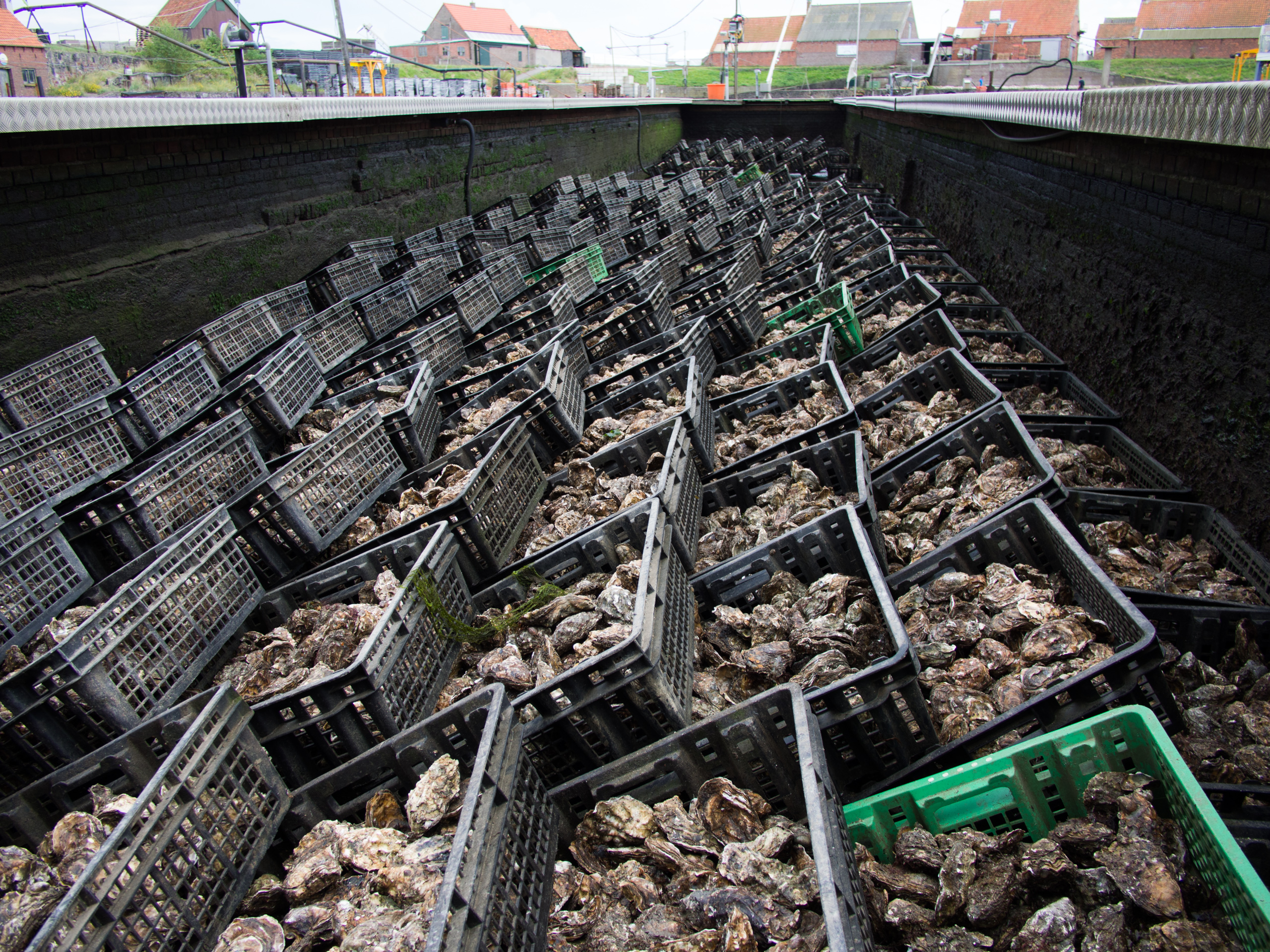
In Yerseke, Netherlands, oysters are kept in large oyster pits after "harvesting", until they are sold. Seawater is pumped in and out, simulating the tide.

Oysters naturally grow in estuarine bodies of brackish water. When farmed, the temperature and salinity of the water are controlled (or at least monitored), so as to induce spawning and fertilization, as well as to speed the rate of maturation – which can take several years.

The first step to cultivating oysters is conditioning broodstock. Broodstock are the "parent" oysters that will provide gametes for larvae. Oysters in the wild are only "ripe" with gametes for a short window. All of the oysters in an area will spawn at the same time to increase the chances that their gametes meet and fertile larvae are produced. To ensure ripe oysters for spawning throughout the season, some growers choose to keep mature oysters in a separate system where the farmer can manipulate the temperature and food within the system. While a recirculating system can be used, a flow-through system is generally better because the natural diversity of phytoplankton is a better diet for conditioning oysters. By setting up this separate system, the farmer can mimic the transition from winter to summer quicker than real-time, and essentially convince the oyster that it is time to spawn whenever the farmer needs more larvae.

When the farmer actually wants to spawn the oysters, they will put a batch of oysters in a tray and rapidly heat and cool the water to induce spawning. It is important to have a large number of oysters, because it is impossible to tell if an oyster is male or female from its outer appearance. Once the oysters start to spawn they can be picked up and placed into their own separate containers until they have released all of their gametes. Eggs and sperm can then be mixed together to fertilize.

Larvae tanks should be cleaned and disinfected before putting water in the tanks. Water quality should be tailored for the particular species, but most larvae will generally grow faster in warmer water. After the fertilized eggs and beginning-stage larvae have been added to the tank, they should be fed filtered or cultured algae daily, and have their water changed every-other day. This ensures no pathogens or foreign organisms enter the system and compete with or eat the larvae, and their water quality stays pristine to encourage growth. This is the most fragile stage of an oyster's life history.

After about two weeks an oyster will be ready to set. They will develop a small, round discoloration called an eyespot. Their muscular foot will be visible under a microscope. At this point, the larvae can be put in a system with a variety of cultch options. The best cultch is usually full or ground up oyster shell because oysters are naturally attracted to other oyster shell to ensure their future reproductive success. After the larvae settle, they are considered "spat."

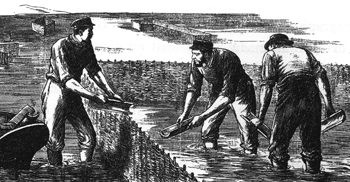
Oyster culture using tiles as cultch. Taken from The Illustrated London News, 1881.

Three methods of cultivation are commonly used. In each case oysters are cultivated to the size of "spat," the point at which they attach themselves to a substrate. The substrate is known as a "cultch" (also spelled "cutch" or "culch"). The loose spat may be allowed to mature further to form "seed" oysters with small shells. In either case (spat or seed stage), they are then set out to mature. The maturation technique is where the cultivation method choice is made.

In one method the spat or seed oysters are distributed over existing oyster beds and left to mature naturally. Such oysters will then be collected using the methods for fishing wild oysters, such as dredging.

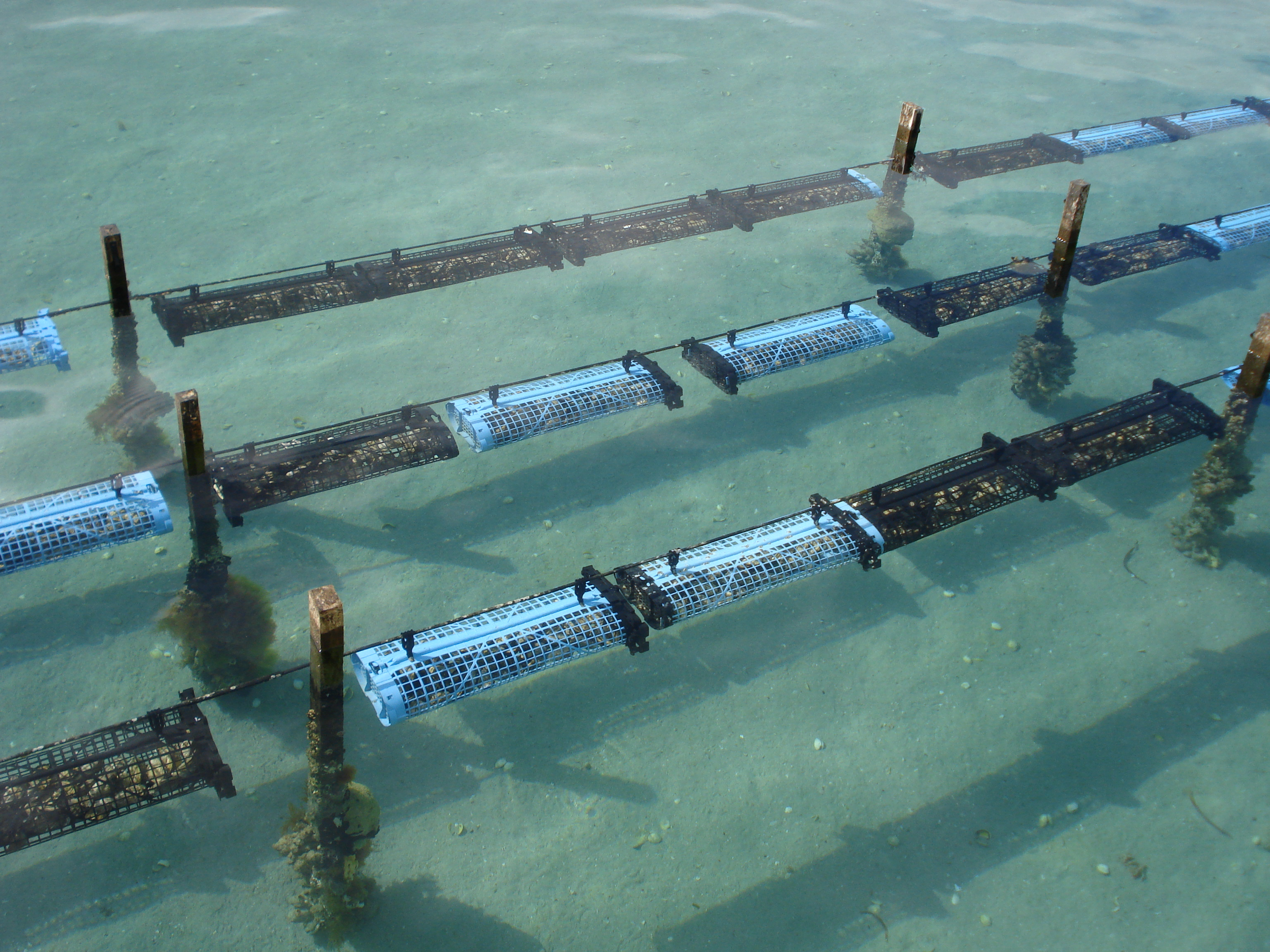
Purpose made oyster baskets

In the second method the spat or seed may be put in racks, bags, or cages (or they may be glued in threes to vertical ropes) which are held above the bottom. Oysters cultivated in this manner may be harvested by lifting the bags or racks to the surface and removing mature oysters, or simply retrieving the larger oysters when the enclosure is exposed at low tide. The latter method may avoid losses to some predators, but is more expensive.

In the third method the spat or seed are placed in a cultch within an artificial maturation tank. The maturation tank may be fed with water that has been especially prepared for the purpose of accelerating the growth rate of the oysters. In particular the temperature and salinity of the water may be altered somewhat from nearby ocean water. The carbonate minerals calcite and aragonite in the water may help oysters develop their shells faster and may also be included in the water processing prior to introduction to the tanks. This latter cultivation technique may be the least susceptible to predators and poaching, but is the most expensive to build and to operate. The Pacific oyster M. gigas is the species most commonly used with this type of farming.

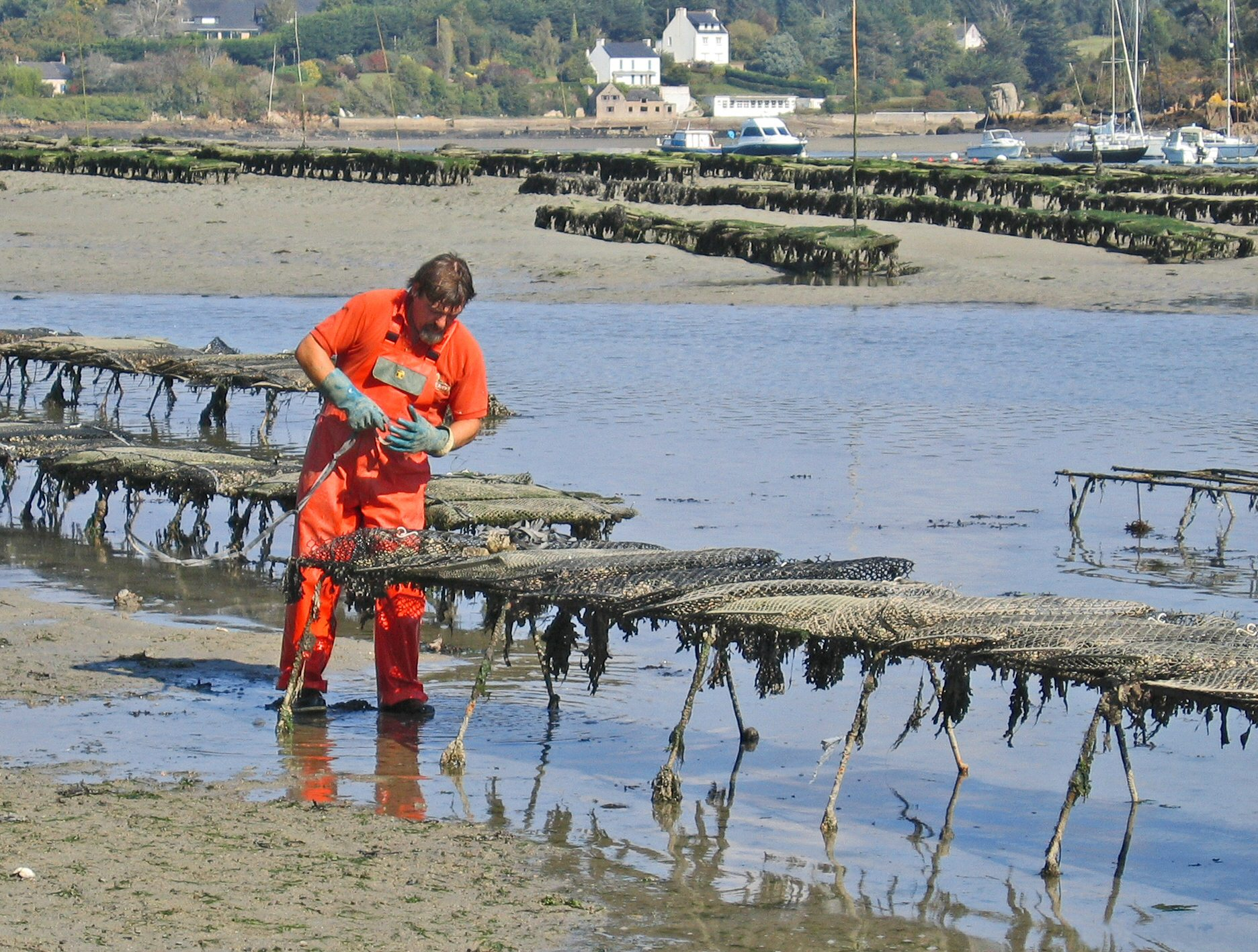
Working on oysters at Belon, Brittany, France 2005

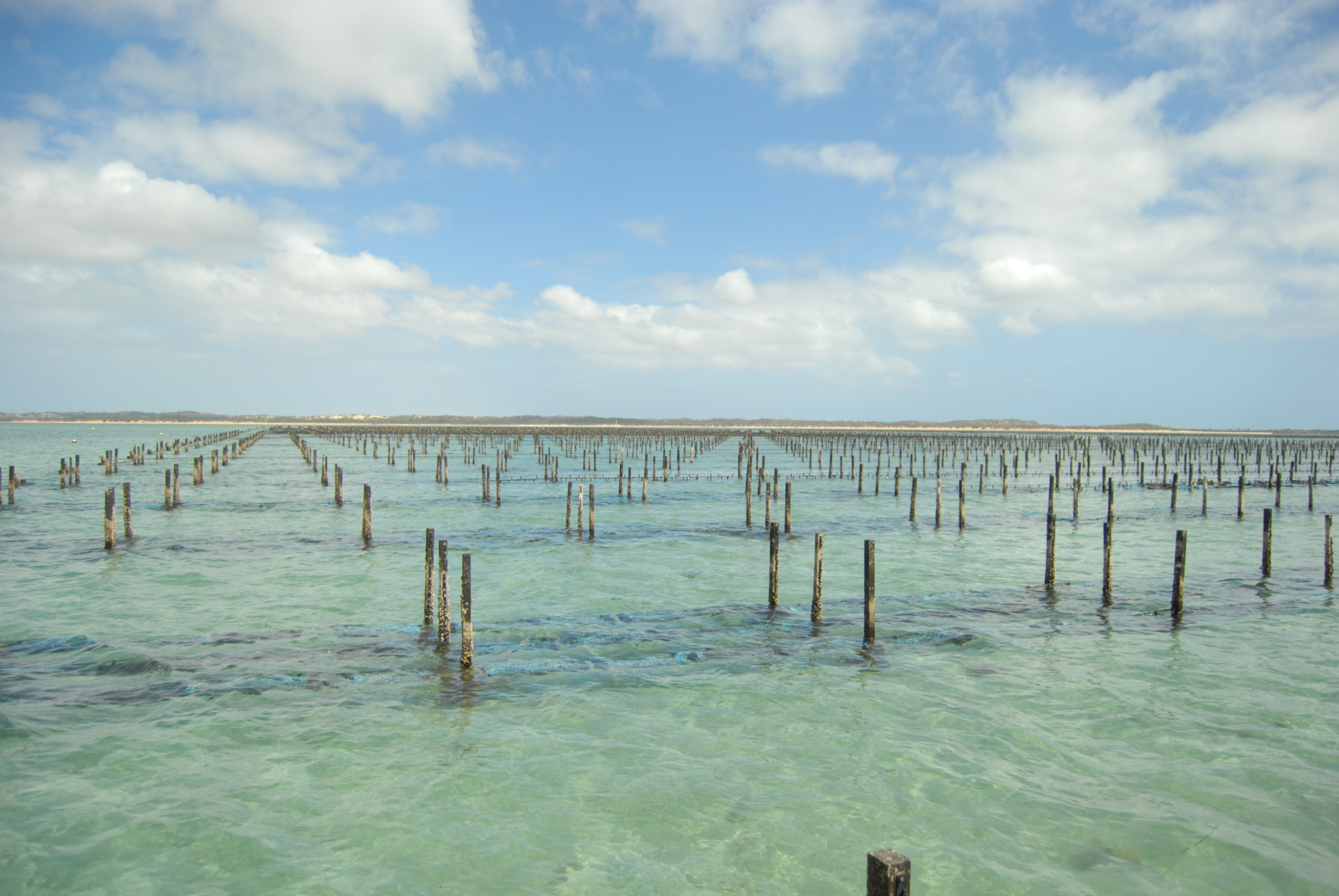
Oyster farm in South Australia

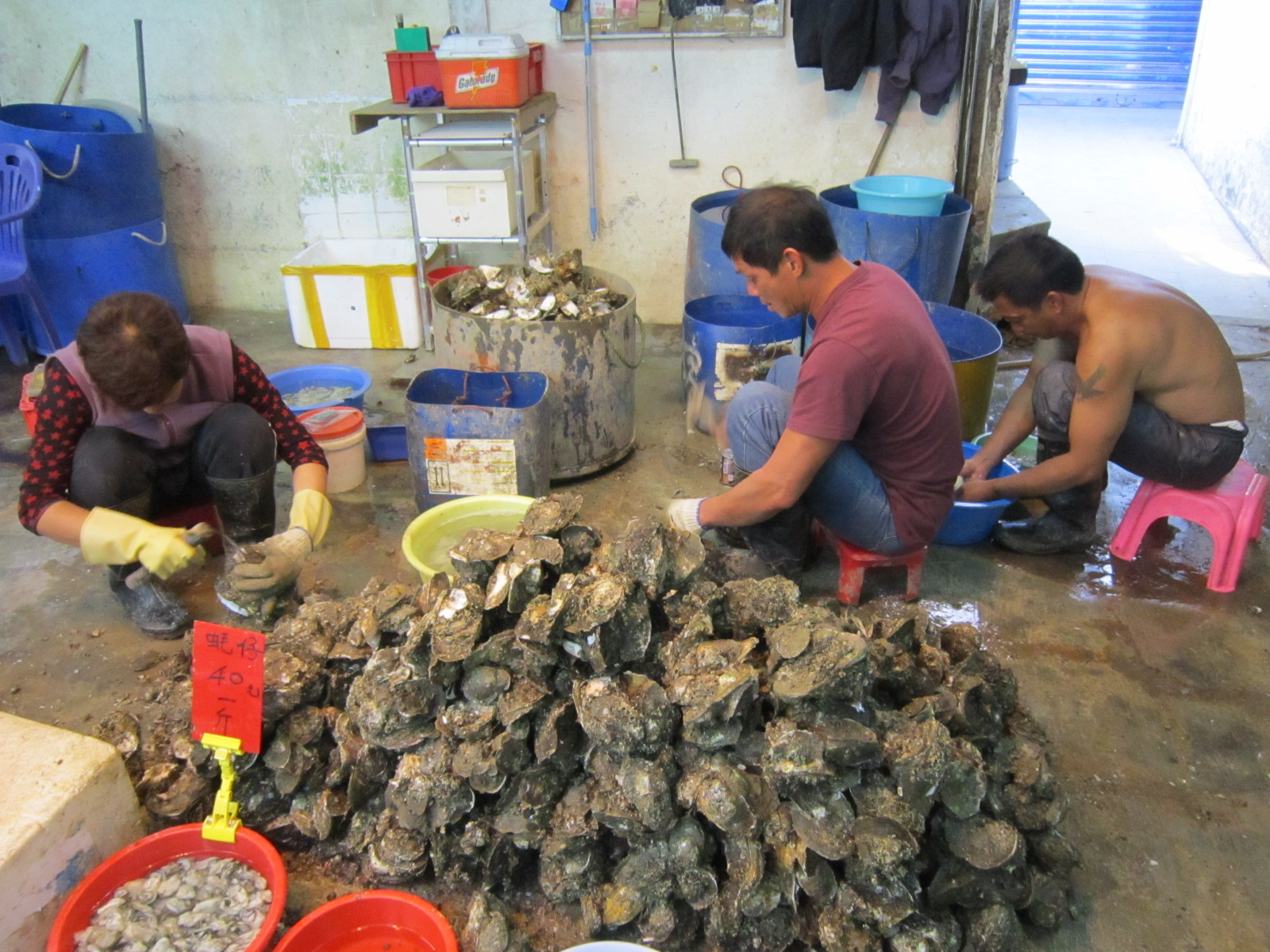
Oyster shucking at Lau Fau Shan, Hong Kong

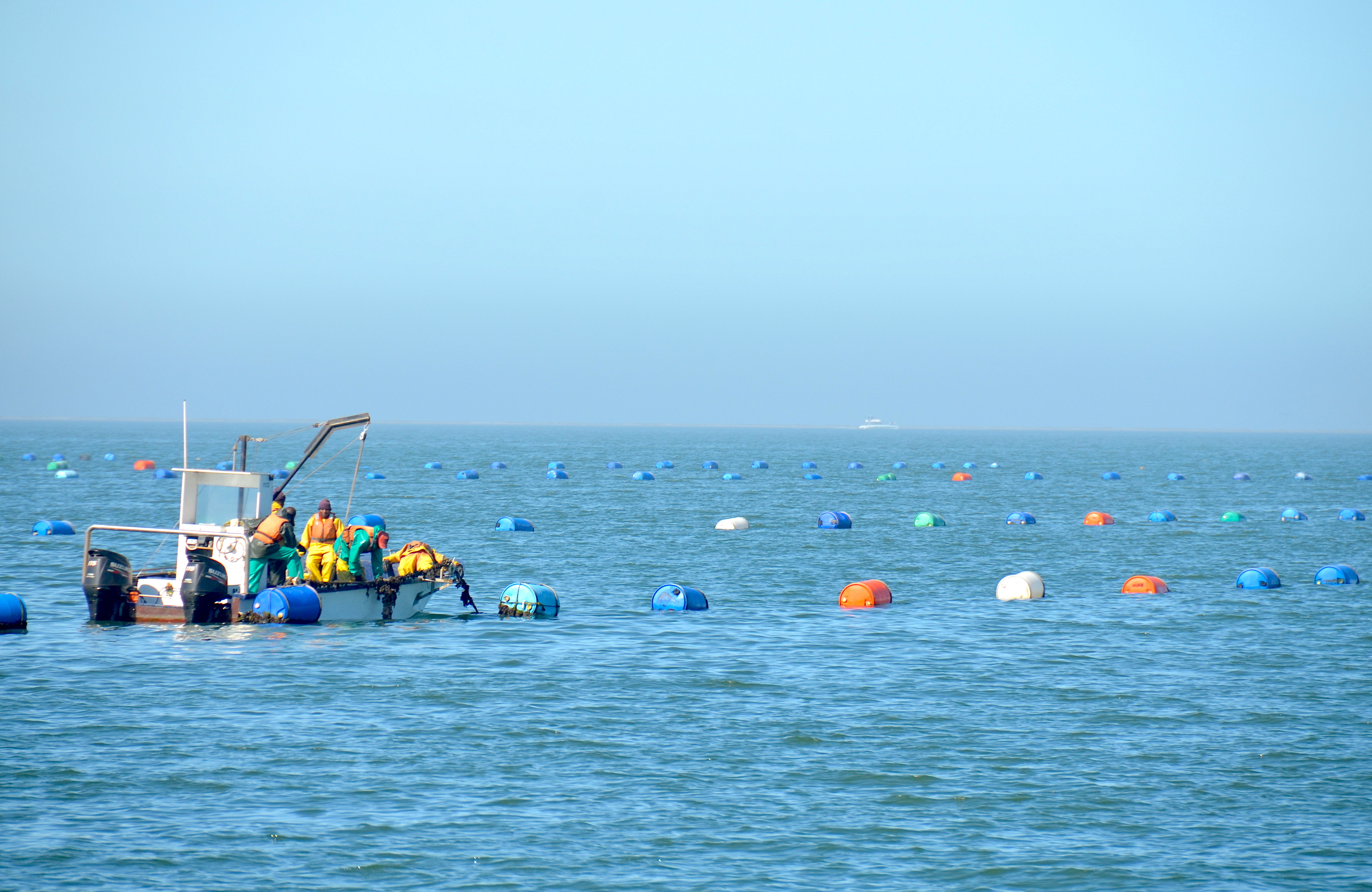
Oyster farming at Walvis Bay, Namibia

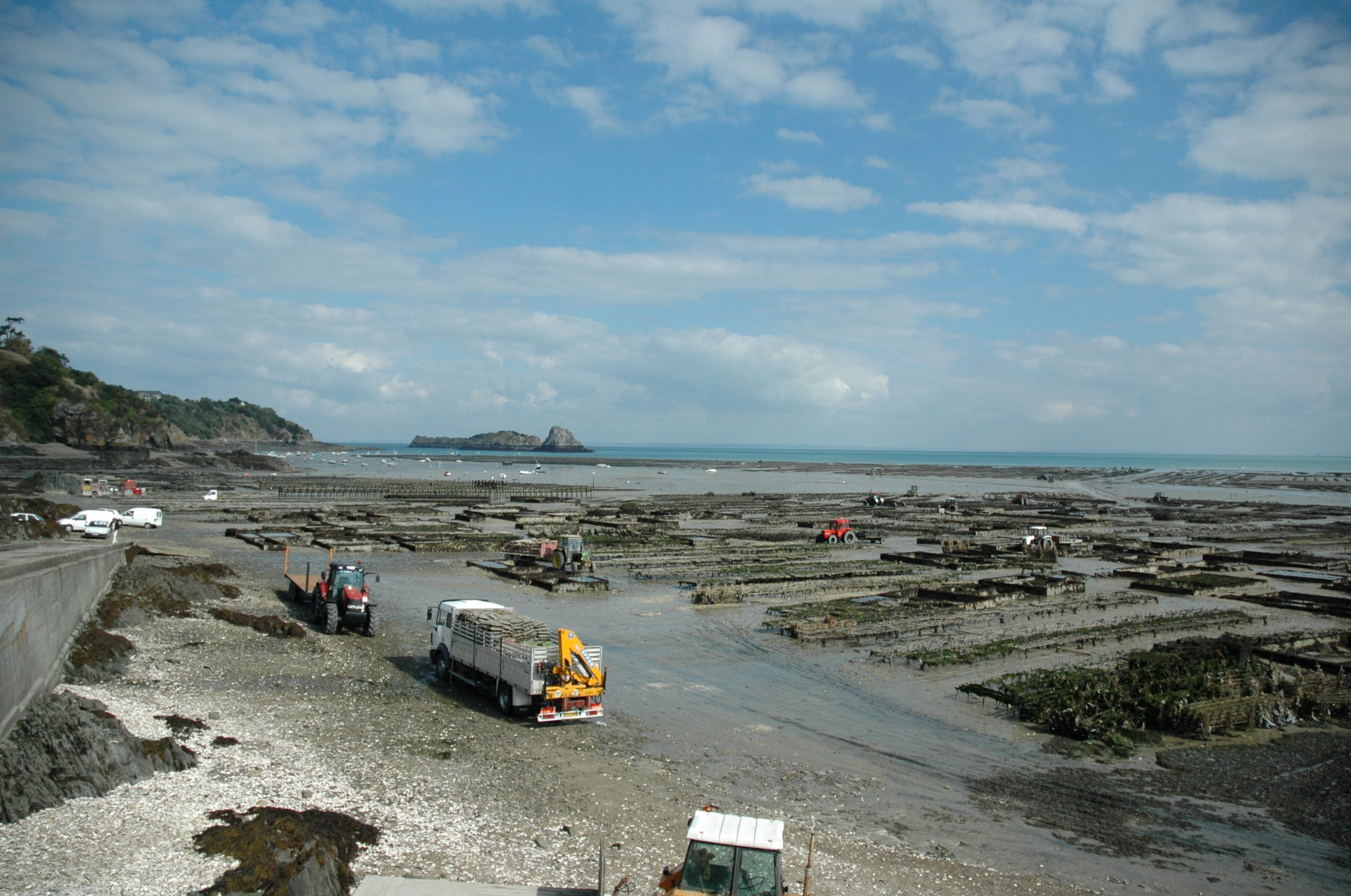
Harvesting oysters from the pier at Cancale, Brittany, France 2005

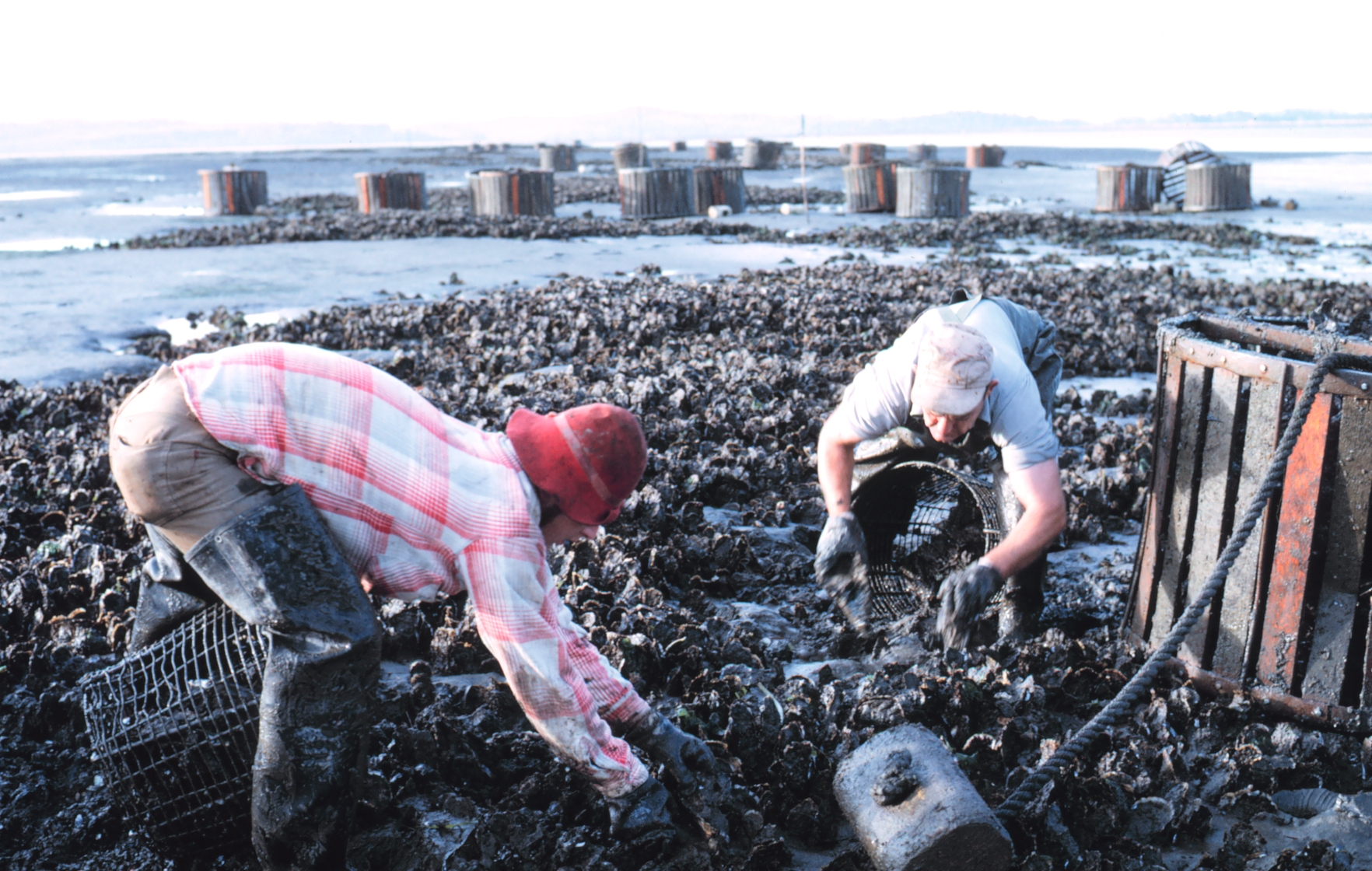
Harvesting oysters from beds by hand in Willapa Bay, Washington state, United States

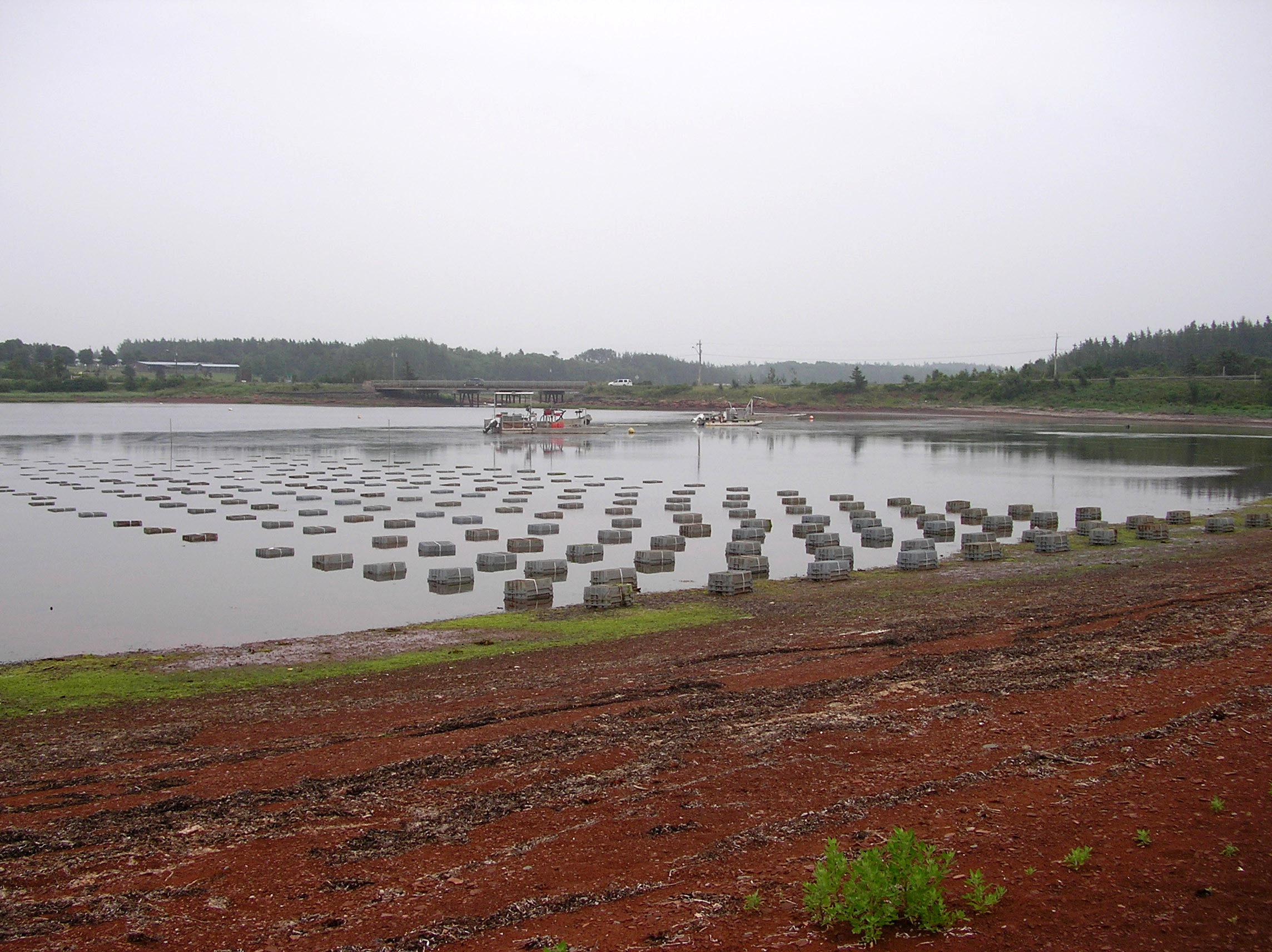
Oysters farmed in baskets on Prince Edward Island, Canada

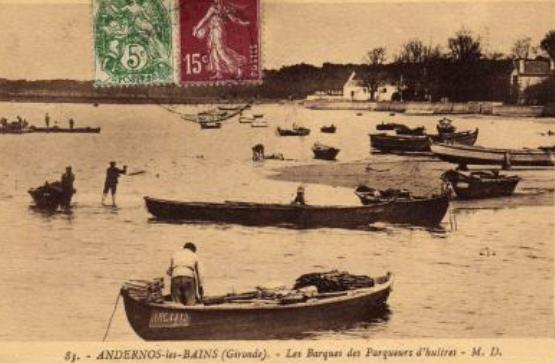
Boats used for culturing oysters in the Gironde estuary, France (circa 1920)

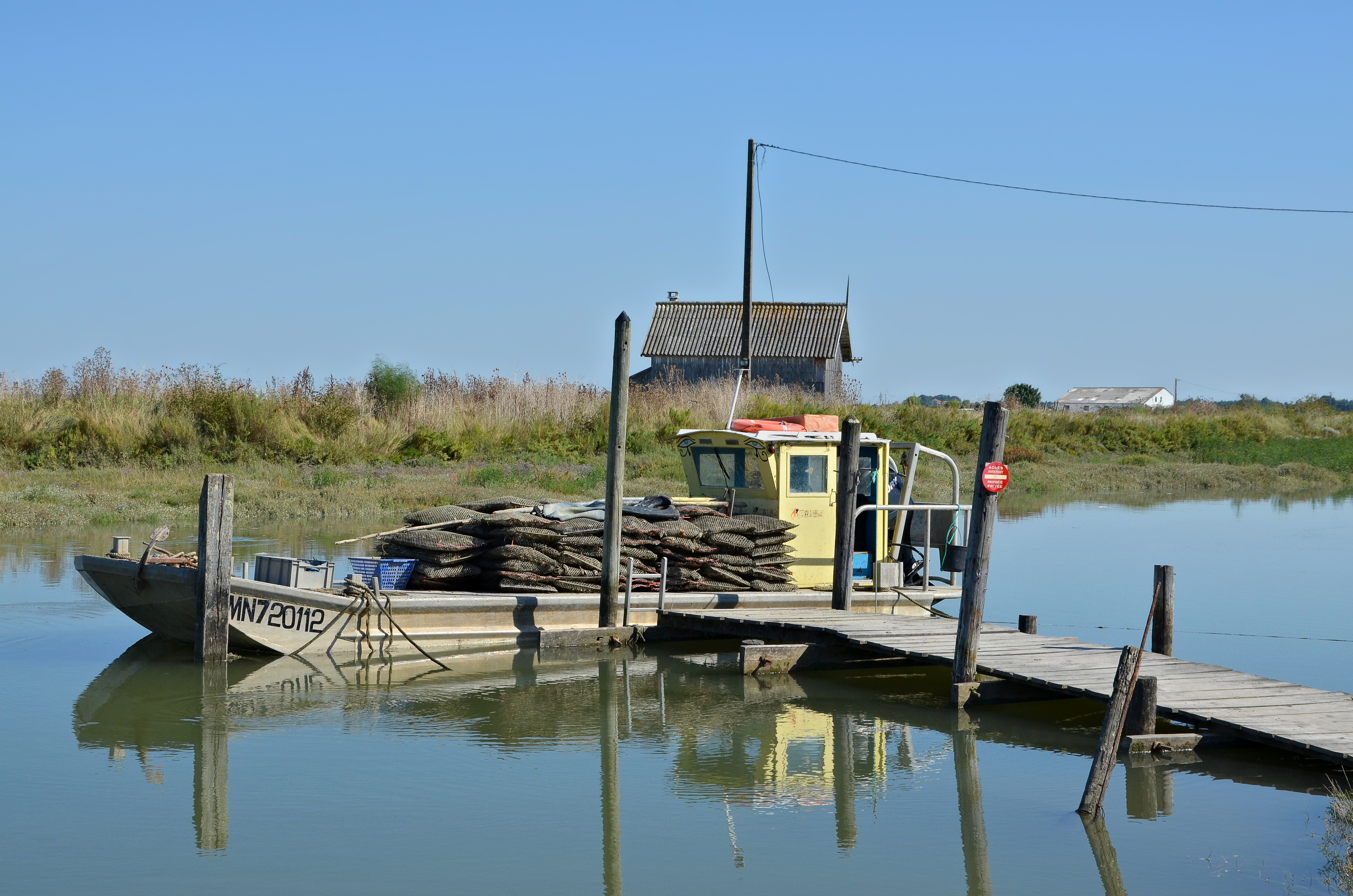
Flat bottomed oyster-boat with oyster-bags in Chaillevette, France

=== Boats ===
During the nineteenth century in the United States, various shallow draft sailboat designs were developed for oystering in the Chesapeake Bay. These included the bugeye, log canoe, pungy, sharpie and skipjack. During the 1880s, a powerboat called the Chesapeake Bay deadrise was also developed.

Since 1977, several boat builders in Brittany have built specialized amphibious vehicles for use in the area's mussel and oyster farming industries. The boats are made of aluminium, are relatively flat-bottomed, and have three, four, or six wheels, depending on the size of the boat. When the tide is out the boats can run on the tidal flats using their wheels. When the tide is in, they use a propeller to move themselves through the water. Oyster farmers in Jersey make use of similar boats.

== Environmental impact ==
While oysters themselves can be very beneficial to their environment, the farming of oysters and other shellfish is not necessarily restorative environmentally. However, it does hold promise for relieving pressure on land-based protein sources. Production of land-based protein sources can be detrimental to the earth environment as they generate a significant amount of greenhouse gases. Oysters, however, produce little to no greenhouse gases, and the difference in emissions between wild oysters and farmed oysters is negligible. The oysters themselves do not produce any methane, one of the most potent greenhouse gases, and just a very minimal amount of nitrous oxide and carbon dioxide. Restoration of oyster populations is encouraged for the ecosystem services they provide, including water quality maintenance, shoreline protection and sediment stabilization, nutrient cycling and sequestration, and habitat for other organisms.

There has been a decline in oyster population due to extensive factors such as climate change and overharvesting of wild populations. Because of this, oyster reef restoration has been significant in the past decades, and a native Olympia oyster restoration project has been implemented in Liberty Bay, Washington. This project uses a "Habitat Sustainability Index (HSI)" to assess the ecological impacts of the restoration. The HSI also measures the benefit to the oyster population as well. Oyster farming in the Chesapeake Bay has minimal or even positive impacts on the surrounding environment, and numerous oyster restoration projects are underway in the Chesapeake Bay. The Chesapeake Bay Foundation started working in conjunction with the Smithsonian Institution in 2022 to revive the oyster population that was disrupted due to the poor health of the water quality. In the U.S., Delaware is the only East Coast state without oyster aquaculture, but making aquaculture a state-controlled industry of leasing water by the acre for commercial harvesting of shellfish is being considered. Recreational oyster harvesting is strictly prohibited to protect both the threatened oysters and to protect people from potential disease. Bycatch reduction devices are required and violation results in a small fine. Supporters of Delaware's legislation to allow aquaculture cite: revenue, job creation, and nutrient cycling as the benefits. For example, It is estimated that one acre can produce nearly 750,000 oysters, which could filter between 15 and 40 million gallons of water daily. This is extremely beneficial to the marine ecosystem because the oysters feed on particulate matter and nitrogen, often from anthropogenic sources. This, in turn, reduces the algae growth and leads to an overall cleaner marine environment.

Other sources state that a single oyster can filter 24–96 liters a day (1–4 liters per hour). With 750,000 oysters in one acre, 18,000,000-72,000,000 liters of water can be filtered, removing most forms of particulate matter suspended in the water column. The particulate matter oysters remove are sand, clay, silt, detritus, and phytoplankton. These particulates all could possibly contain harmful contamination that originates from anthropogenic sources (the land or directly flowing into the body of water). Instead of becoming ingested by other filter feeders that are then digested by bigger organisms, oysters can sequester these possibly harmful pollutants, and excrete them into the sediment at the bottom of waterways. To remove these contaminants from the sediment, species of seaweed can also be added to the aquaculture to take up some of these contaminants in their plant tissues. The seaweed can then be removed and taken to a contained area where the contamination is benign to the surrounding environment. More recently, large-scale cultivation of oysters and other shellfish has been proposed as a method to combat climate change, because the growth of the oyster shell sequesters atmospheric carbon dioxide in a form (calcium carbonate) that is stable over geologic time. In The United States, the cultivation of Pacific oysters in tidal areas not only improves water quality in the ocean but oyster cultivation also works to improve government policy.

Oyster farming in the United States must obey federal regulations, maps, and models. Federal regulation monitors the safety of the environment and the health effects on humans. For example, Carlsbad Aquafarm located in Southern California is cultivating Pacific oysters by using rafts and trays to utilize space to optimize production while operating near the newly opened Claude Lewis Carlsbad Desalination Plant. New adopted environmental impact regulations and policies were created and updated by The United States Environmental Protection Agency, which approved the location and construction of the Claude Lewis Carlsbad Desalination Plant through the federal Clean Water Act on April 7, 2016, whose main focus was minimizing environmental impact in conjunction with Carlsbad Aquafarm. Applications and permits for aquaculture projects such as the Avalon Ocean Farm are made public and required to follow the same guidelines of the EPA and the CWA. Water Quality, Marine Mammals (including endangered species), and forecasted environmental impact evaluations are listed in the project's description to minimize, manage, and mitigate its environmental impact.

== Predators, diseases and pests ==
Oyster predators include starfish, oyster drill snails, stingrays, Florida stone crabs, birds, such as oystercatchers and gulls, and humans.

Pathogens that can affect either farmed C. virginica or C. gigas oysters include Perkinsus marinus (Dermo) and Haplosporidium nelsoni (MSX). However, C. virginica are much more susceptible to Dermo or MSX infections than are the C. gigas species of oyster. Pathogens of O. edulis oysters include Marteilia refringens and Bonamia ostreae. Susceptibility of oysters to disease is further influenced by climate change, as factors such as warmer waters and altered salinity can weaken oysters' health and allow for pathogens like Dermo to more easily spread.

Dermo disease is caused by a protozoan parasite that infects the oyster's blood cells: Perkinsus marinus. It is spread when infective stages are released into the water column from an infected oyster and siphoned into a new host. It is most common in water above 77 °F.

MSX stands for "Multinucleated Sphere Unknown" and is lethal to C. virginica. It is a single-celled protozoan with an unknown method of transmission between oysters. It does not appear to transfer from oyster-to-oyster like Dermo does. After an outbreak in 1997, a strain of MSX-resistant oysters were developed. MSX can be suppressed by low temperatures and low salinities, but once infected, oysters will die within a month.

MSX and Dermo are both considered to be non-harmful to humans. Vibrio, however, is a disease that is carried by oysters and other shellfish and can make people sick, but is not harmful to the oyster itself. Vibrio can only be passed from oysters to humans if they are consumed raw. Vibrio is more common in warmer waters, and all commercial shellfish must be refrigerated before being served in an attempt to kill the vibrio bacterium.

Novel scientific breeding methods aim to address the susceptibility of oyster species to disease. One promising solution that has already been implemented into breeding programs is genomic selection, which relies on resources like molecular marker identification and transcriptome data to select for and enhance a wide array of traits (such as disease resistance) in oysters. However, the limited scope of existing research and financial barriers make implementation challenging.

Polydorid polychaetes are known as pests of cultured oysters.

Oyster crabs are highly specialized crabs that live in an endosymbiotic commensal relationship within a host oyster. Since oyster crabs are considered a food delicacy they may not be removed from young farmed oysters, as they can themselves be harvested for sale.

== See also ==
- Gathering seafood by hand
- Oyster pirate
- Oystering machinery
- Pinasse from the Arcachon basin
