= Brown Smith Jones =

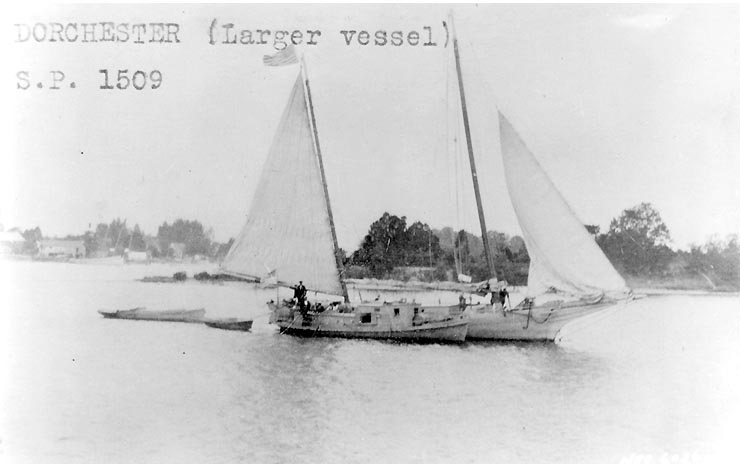
- The Brown Smith Jones in naval service as the USS Dorchester with a motorboat alongside during World War I, probably in the Chesapeake Bay area.

History

Maryland
- Name: Brown Smith Jones
- Namesake: governor, comptroller, and treasurer of Maryland
- Owner: Maryland State Fishery Police
- Builder: G. T. Johnson, Cambridge
- Completed: 1894
- Fate: Acquired by US Navy

History

United States
- Name: Dorchester
- Namesake: Dorchester County, Maryland
- Acquired: 24 August 1917
- Commissioned: 24 August 1917
- Decommissioned: 26 November 1918
- Fate: Returned to owner

History

Maryland
- Name: Brown Smith Jones
- Owner: Maryland State Fishery Police
- Acquired: 26 November 1918
- Fate: Sold to private owner; converted to yacht

General characteristics
- Type: Patrol vessel
- Length: 65.8 ft (20.1 m)
- Beam: 18.7 ft (5.7 m)
- Draft: 5.8 ft (1.8 m)
- Propulsion: Sails
- Sail plan: Schooner-rigged

The Brown Smith Jones was a patrol boat of the Maryland State Fishery Police which also served in the United States Navy as a patrol vessel from 1917 to 1918.

It was built in 1894 and took its name from the last names respectively of the governor, the state comptroller, and the state treasurer. The design was that of a Chesapeake Bay bugeye, a type of oyster-dredging boat, but with an enlarged cabin replacing the equipment for handling the dredge. She was equipped with a one-pound repeating rifle mounted before the foremast.

The U.S. Navy acquired her on 24 August 1917 for World War I service as a patrol vessel and she was commissioned the same day as the USS Dorchester (SP-1509).. She served in the 5th Naval District for the remainder of World War I, patrolling waters in Maryland and Virginia. The Navy decommissioned her and returned her to the state on 26 November 1918.

In the early 1930s the ship was sold to H. K. Rigg and converted to a yacht.
