= Hatchery =

Facility for incubating and hatching animals

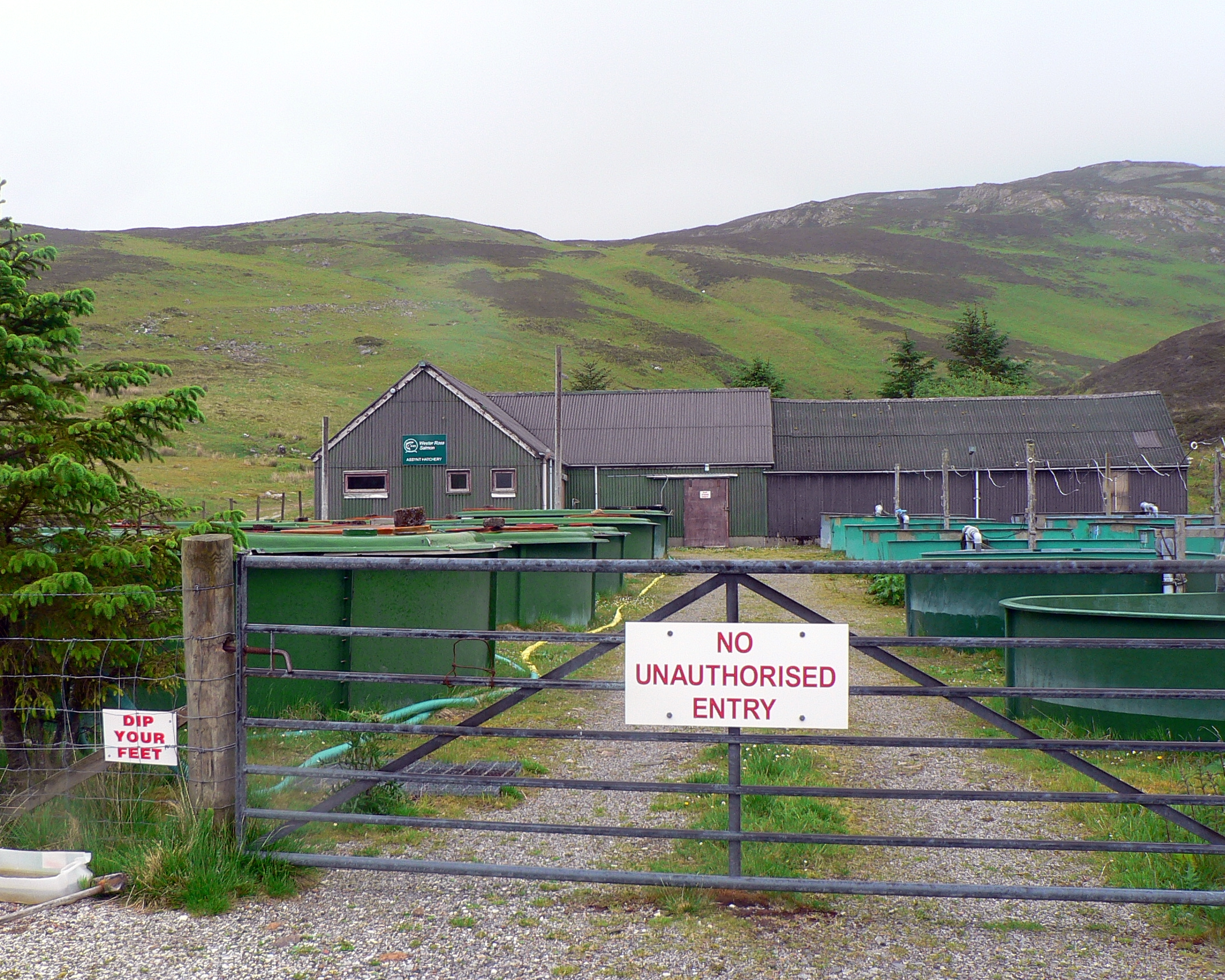
Assynt Salmon Hatchery, near Inchnadamph in the Scottish Highlands

A hatchery is a facility where eggs are hatched under artificial conditions, especially those of fish, poultry or even turtles. It may be used for ex situ conservation purposes, i.e. to breed rare or endangered species under controlled conditions; alternatively and more commonly, it may be for economic reasons (i.e. to enhance food supplies or fishery resources).

== Fish hatcheries ==
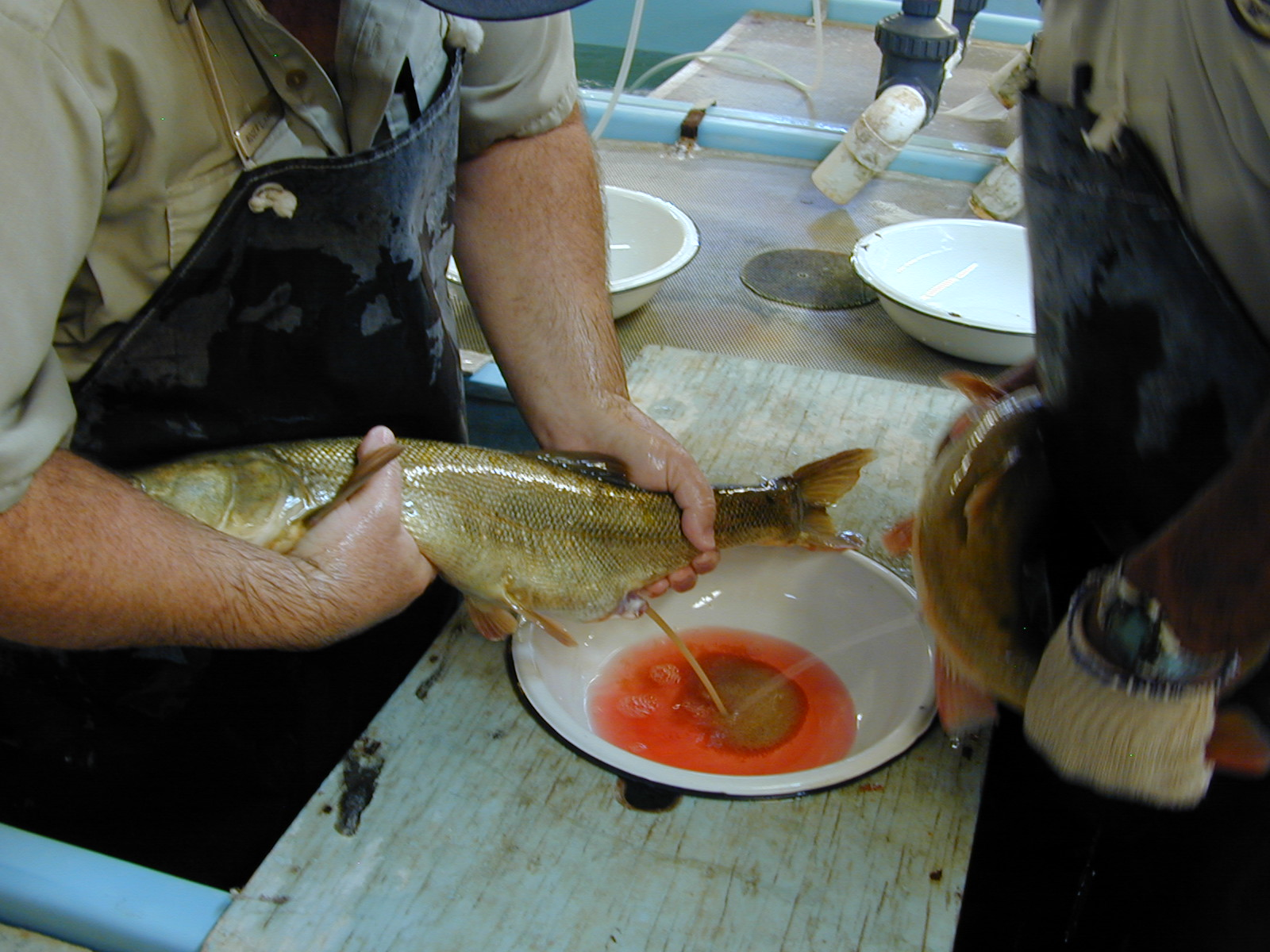
Stripping eggs

Fish hatcheries are used to cultivate and breed a large number of fish in an enclosed environment. Fish farms use hatcheries to cultivate fish to sell for food, or ornamental purposes, eliminating the need to find the fish in the wild and even providing some species outside their natural season. They raise the fish until they are ready to be eaten or sold to aquarium stores. Other hatcheries release the juvenile fish into a river, lake or the ocean to support commercial, tribal, or recreational fishing or to supplement the natural numbers of threatened or endangered species, a practice known as fish stocking.

Researchers have raised concerns about hatchery fish potentially breeding with wild fish. Hatchery fish escapees may in some cases compete with wild fish. There have been cases of more hatchery reared salmon being found in Canadian streams then wild reared salmon. This causes excess competition in wild salmon populations and can introduce unwanted genes and diseases. Hatcheries tend to be genetically homogenous, so they can reduce the natural genetic variability found in the wild as hatchery fish come to dominate stream systems. In the United States and Canada, there have been several salmon and steelhead hatchery reform projects intended to reduce the possibility of negative impacts from hatchery programs. Most salmon and steelhead hatcheries are managed better and follow up to date management practices to ensure any risks are curtailed.

== Poultry hatcheries ==
Poultry hatcheries produce a majority of the birds consumed in the developed world including chickens, turkeys, ducks, geese, and some other minor bird species. A few poultry hatcheries specialize in producing birds for sale to backyard poultry keepers, hobby farmers, and people who are interested in competing with their birds at poultry shows. These hatcheries produce chicks of several different breeds and varieties, often including some heritage or endangered breeds.

Larger poultry hatcheries are related to industrial poultry meat or egg production. This is a multibillion-dollar industry, with highly regimented production systems used to maximize bird size or egg production versus feed consumed. Generally large numbers are produced at one time so the resulting birds are uniform in size and can be slaughtered (for meat) or brought into production (for eggs) at the same time. A large hatchery produces 15 million chicks annually.

Poultry generally start with naturally (most species) or artificially (turkeys and Cornish-related chicken breeds) inseminated hens that lay eggs; the eggs are cleaned and shells are checked for soundness before being put into the incubators. Incubators control temperature and humidity, and turn the eggs until just before they hatch. Three days before the eggs are scheduled to hatch, they are moved into a hatcher unit, where they are no longer turned so the embryos have time to get properly oriented for their exit from the shell, and the temperature and humidity are optimum for hatching. The eggs will hatch during a period that is often referred to as the hatching window, which can stretch from 24 to 48 hours depending on biological variation. Once the eggs hatch and the chicks are a few days old, they are often vaccinated. Chicks hatched conventionally are provided feed and water first when they reach the rearing farm. In the meantime, they rely on their yolk sac for nutrients.

== Turtle hatcheries ==
A turtle hatchery is a place where turtle eggs can be taken from wild nests to hatch in a more controlled environment. The purpose of a turtle hatchery is to benefit conservation efforts. Sea turtle species are becoming endangered due to climate change. Turtles sexes are based on the nest temperature that the eggs are stored in. Due to climate change, more turtles are hatching as females. Turtle hatcheries are combatting this issue by moving eggs to an area of the beach with increased shading and extra cooling factors, and increased depth of nests to hatch more male turtles. The hatchlings, if healthy upon hatching, are able to leave on their own and make the trek to the ocean just like non-hatchery born turtles. Sea turtle hatcheries are usually successful in producing more turtles than untouched nests.

Turtle hatcheries have ethical concerns brought on by the public. Many hatcheries located on coasts are marketed as tourist attractions. These locations let the general public handle the eggs and keep hatchlings back for visitors to handle and photograph. Most sea turtle species eggs hatch at night to minimize the risk of predation and overheating caused by the frenzy of the initial crawl to the water. Humans are the biggest threat to turtles due to hunting, poaching, egg theft, pet trade, and bycatch from fishing. When hatcheries hold hatchling turtles back for tourists, the hatchling is exposed to its largest predator, they are released in the day after the nutrients from their yolk sack are used up, and predators can easily spot them on the trek to the ocean.

== See also ==
- Endangered species
- Minimum viable population
- Inbreeding depression
- Oystering machinery
