= Lady Maryland =

Topsail schooner

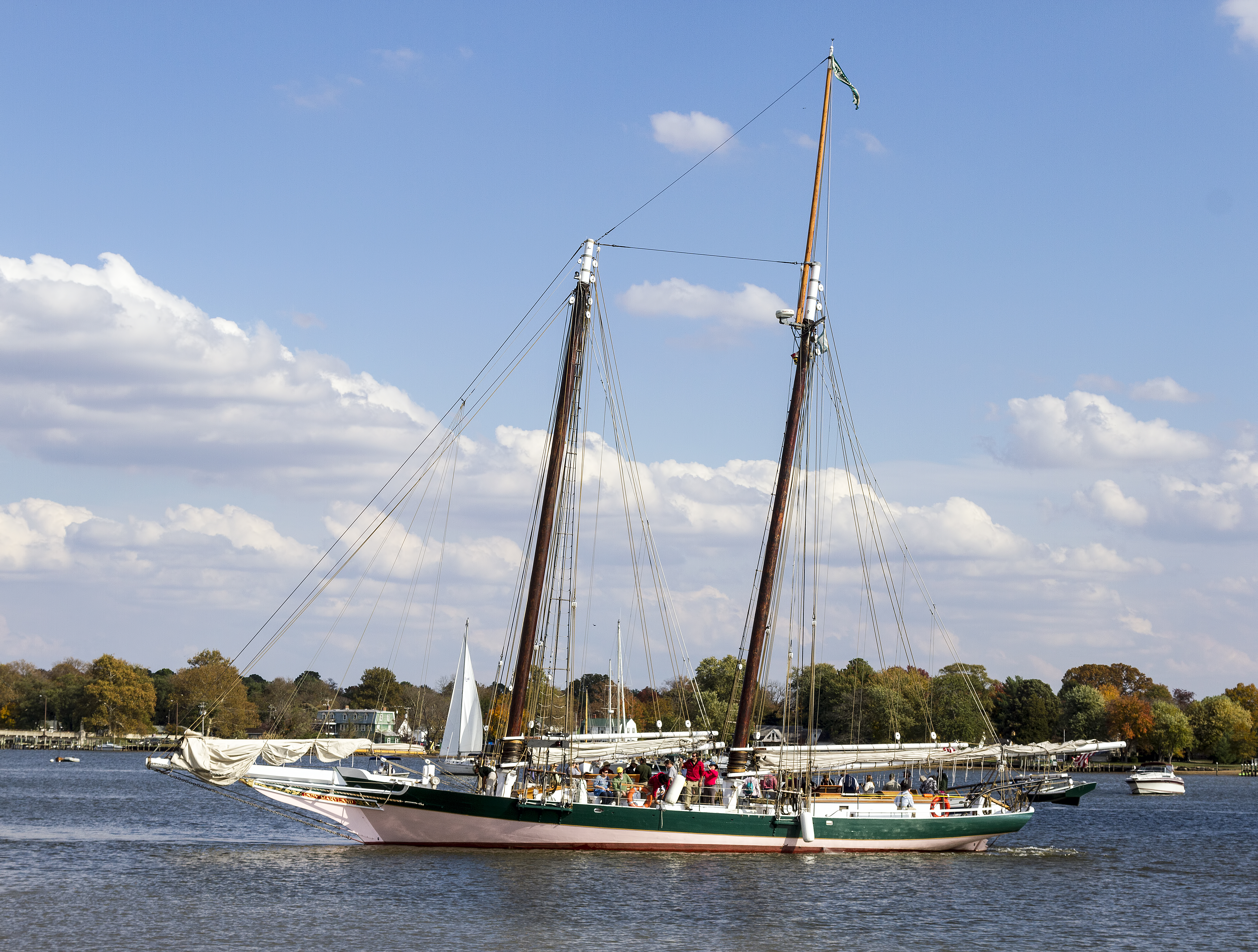
- The Lady Maryland on the Chester River, Maryland in 2013

History
- Name: Lady Maryland
- Owner: Living Classrooms Foundation
- Builder: Lady Maryland Foundation
- Laid down: 1985
- Launched: 1986
- Home port: Baltimore, Maryland
- Identification: Call sign: WTV4008; USCG Doc. No.: 903524
- Status: In active service

General characteristics
- Type: Pungy / topsail schooner
- Tonnage: 82 tons
- Length: 104 ft (32 m) overall
- Beam: 22 ft (6.7 m)
- Height: 85 ft (26 m)
- Draft: 7 ft (2.1 m)
- Installed power: 2 × 85 horsepower (63 kW) Cummins diesel engines
- Propulsion: Sails / inboard engine
- Sail plan: Topsail schooner (jib, foresail, mainsail, topsail); (2,994 square feet (278.2 m^{2}))

Lady Maryland is a 104-foot (32 m) gaff-rigged, wood-hulled pungy topsail schooner. She is owned and operated by the Baltimore-based Living Classrooms Foundation and is used as an educational vessel. Lady Maryland is one of four historic wooden sailing ship replicas designed by Thomas C. Gillmer.
