= Bugeye =

Chesapeake Bay sailboat type for oyster dredging

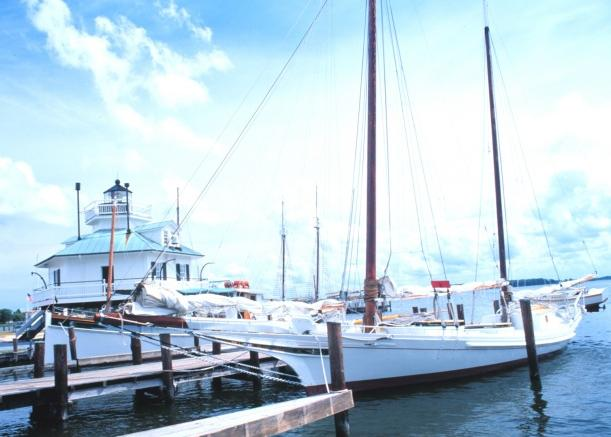
Edna Lockwood, a surviving bugeye.

The bugeye is a type of sailboat developed in the Chesapeake Bay for oyster dredging. The predecessor of the skipjack, it was superseded by the latter as oyster harvests dropped.

== Origins ==
Between 1820 and 1865, the state of Maryland banned the practice of dredging for oysters. In the latter year, the law was relaxed; the use of steam power remained banned, however, and remained entirely prohibited until 1965, in which year powered dredging was allowed two days of the week. As long as dredging for oysters in the Chesapeake was prohibited, oystermen working from log canoes tonged for oysters. In 1854 the Maryland legislature permitted the use of dredges in the waters of Somerset County, Maryland, expanding the use of dredges to the rest of the Bay following the Civil War. Opening the Chesapeake to oyster dredging after the Civil War created a need for larger, more powerful boats to haul dredges across the oyster beds.

The first vessels used were the existing sloops, pungys and schooners on the Bay, but none of these types was well suited to the purpose; pungys and schooners were too deep in their draft to work the shallower waters of the Bay, the schooners and sloops had bulwarks too high to facilitate handling the dredges, the relatively complex rigs of all three types required uneconomically large crews of skilled sailors, and the vessels themselves were relatively expensive to build and maintain.

The log canoes had none of these disadvantages, but were too small to successfully haul dredges. The result was the development during the 1870s and 1880s of the brogan, an enlarged log canoe. In brogans, the open hull of the log canoe was decked, with hatches covering holds created by subdividing the hull with bulkheads. Brogans typically used the same sail plan as the log canoes of the Tilghman Island region, a leg-of-mutton (i.e., triangular) foresail, mainsail and jib, with the foremast taller than the main. Both masts raked rather sharply aft, with the mainmast raked significantly more sharply than the foremast.^{1}

Brogans were still too small to effectively haul dredges, and continued to be enlarged and improved. By the early 1880s, or possibly even earlier, the first bugeyes were being built.^{2} Over the next twenty years, the bugeye became the dominant type of vessel employed in oystering, but by 1893 construction of new bugeyes began to decline with the introduction of the skipjack, which was less expensive to build, operate and maintain yet was very well suited to dredging for oysters. No working bugeyes appear to have been built after 1918, but bugeyes continued to be employed in oystering and freighting until the middle of the Twentieth Century, albeit in ever-decreasing numbers.^{3}

The origin of the name is obscure.

== Design ==
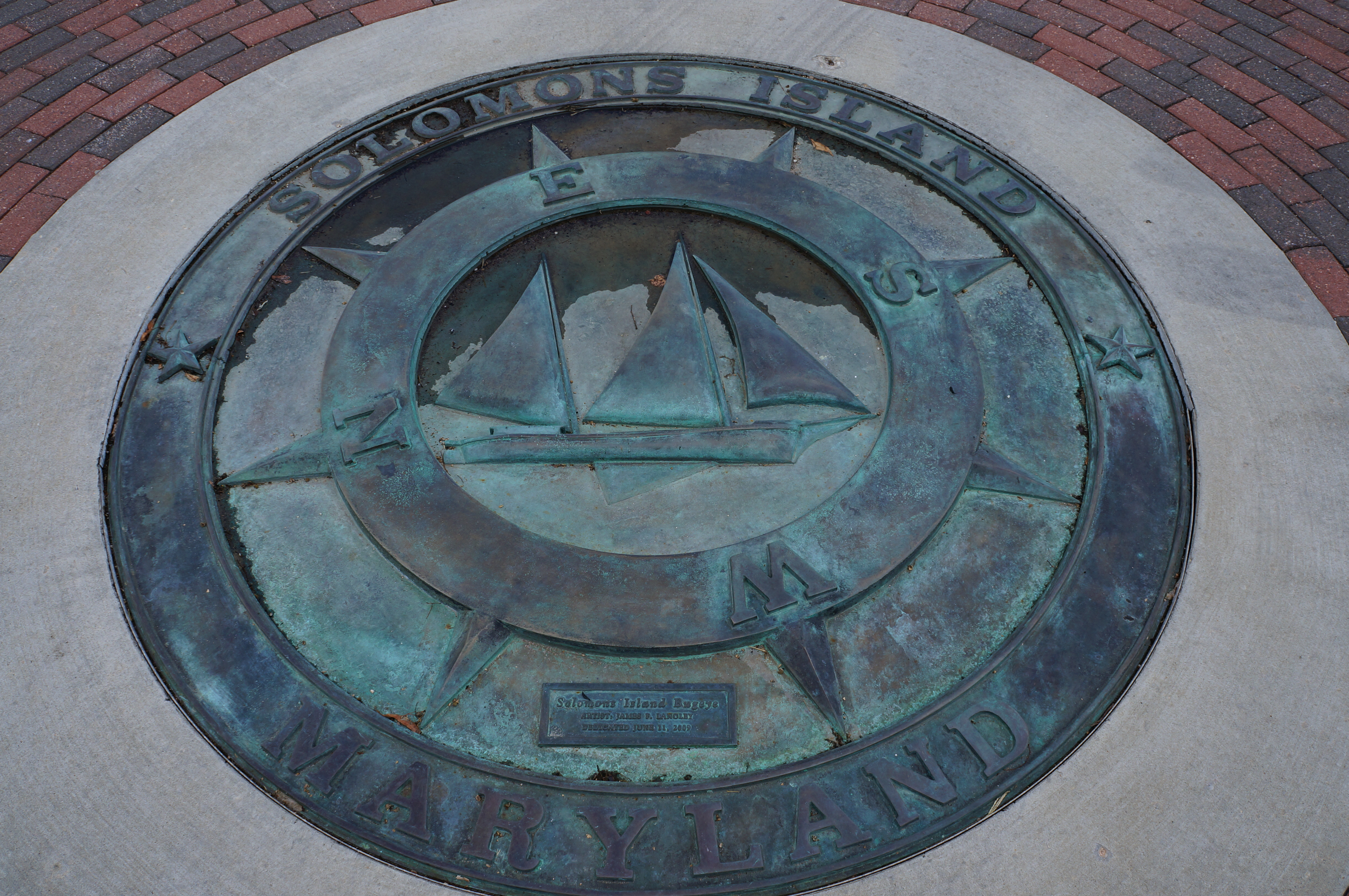
Bugeye pictured on a visitors' wayfinding compass on Solomons Island

Like the earlier brogan, the typical bugeye, designed by William Reeves who was originally from Nova Scotia, was two-masted, with triangular “leg-of-mutton” mainsail, foresail and jib. By modern standards, this rig would be described as a ketch rig, but it appears that watermen of the time referred to it as simply a leg-of-mutton or a bugeye rig. Unlike modern ketches, the forward-most mast was referred to as the foremast and the after mast was termed the mainmast, although like the brogan and log canoe, the mainmast was shorter than the foremast. As with the earlier brogans and the log canoes, the masts were sharply raked (tilted), although they were set up with stays and shrouds. Unlike the brogan, however, the mainmast was raked only slightly more sharply than the foremast.^{4} A bowsprit with trailboards was inevitably used.

The hull was beamy (wide) and shallow, with no chine. Initially it was chunked from logs, in the manner of the log canoe; eventually conventional framed construction was introduced as the supply of suitable trees was depleted. The usual form was double-ended, with a sharp stern, and most such boats had a heavy beam called the "duck tail" projecting a short distance from the stern in order to protect the rudder. To increase deck space a "patent stern" was installed after 1893; it consisted of a set of three beams: one across the duck tail, and two joining its ends to either side of the boat. The ostensible purpose, according to the patent in question, was to provide a mounting spot for davits for a dinghy; the whole area, however, could be planked over to provide a considerable increase in deck space. All log bugeyes were sharp-sterned, but some frame versions had round sterns; a very few had a square transom. The freeboard was invariably low, the better to lift the dredges onto the deck.

Due to the wide, flat bottom, a centerboard was provided. Early boats used a tiller for steering, but as patent steering gear became available, the wheel came into use instead.

Besides the raked, paired masts, the other distinctive feature of the bugeye is the mounting of the bowsprit. This was mounted between paired hawsepieces (boards with a rope- or cable-hole) and knightheads, and terminated in a large vertical post called the "samson post", upon which the anchor windlass was also typically mounted. The hawsepieces projected above the deck and, with the prominent hawseholes, are thought possibly to be the origin of the name "bugeye".

In the center of the ship sat the windlass (generally called the "winder") for the dredge lines. Early winders were simple hand-cranked spools, eventually equipped with devices to prevent injuries when the dredge caught on an obstruction. As gas and diesel engines became available they replaced the hand-cranked winder. In either case a pair of rollers was mounted at the rail on either side, to protect the hull from rubbing and to reduce friction as the dredges were raised.

By and large there was very little development within the type, other than the minor improvements already listed. There was a small trend towards increasing size; bugeyes averaged around 55 feet (17 m) in length, but some later examples were well over 80 feet (24 m) long. Variations in the sail plan were tried, particularly with additional jibs, gaff rigging and staysails. A few were built with a single mast, resulting in a boat with a superficial resemblance to the skipjack.

== Operation ==
Oystering was performed in the winter (the "R months" of September through April); in the summer the boats were used in light freight work where it was available. For oystering the boat would be taken out to the bed, and the dredge would be dropped as a pass was made at speed over the bed. At the end of the run the dredge would be lifted onto the deck and the live oysters separated from the dead shells and other debris. This process would be repeated until sufficient oysters were obtained. More enterprising captains would then sail the boat directly to the markets in Baltimore, Crisfield, and other towns where the oysters were bought at wholesale and processed. Alternatively, the catch could be sold to a buy boat, which acted as a middle man in the process. Some boats both dredged and acted as buy boats, in which case a bushel basket would be mounted on the fore mast to indicate the latter.

With its low freeboard, the bugeye was not generally considered to be an ocean-going vessel; some boats were however sailed to the West Indies in the off season for the tropical trade. One bugeye, the Brown Smith Jones, was built for the Maryland Oyster Police. It had the distinction of being commissioned in the United States Navy in World War I, taking the name USS Dorchester in this service.

== Decline of the type ==
Construction of bugeyes closely paralleled the oyster harvest, which peaked in 1884. As the catch declined, the skipjack became more popular, as it was smaller and cheaper to build. Bugeye construction dropped to almost nothing shortly after the turn of the century. Many of the survivors gave up dredging and devoted themselves to the buy boat business, in which case the sails were no longer wanted. In a typical conversion the bowsprit and main mast were removed entirely, and the fore mast shortened and modified into a derrick for hoisting. A stern cabin for the wheel and an engine for power completed the transformation. (The William B. Tennison is a surviving example of such a conversion.) As a result of such conversions, and simple attrition, surviving bugeyes are extremely rare, and only one (the Edna E. Lockwood) survives in its original form. The plan was however taken up as a pleasure craft, and new versions for that purpose continue to be built.

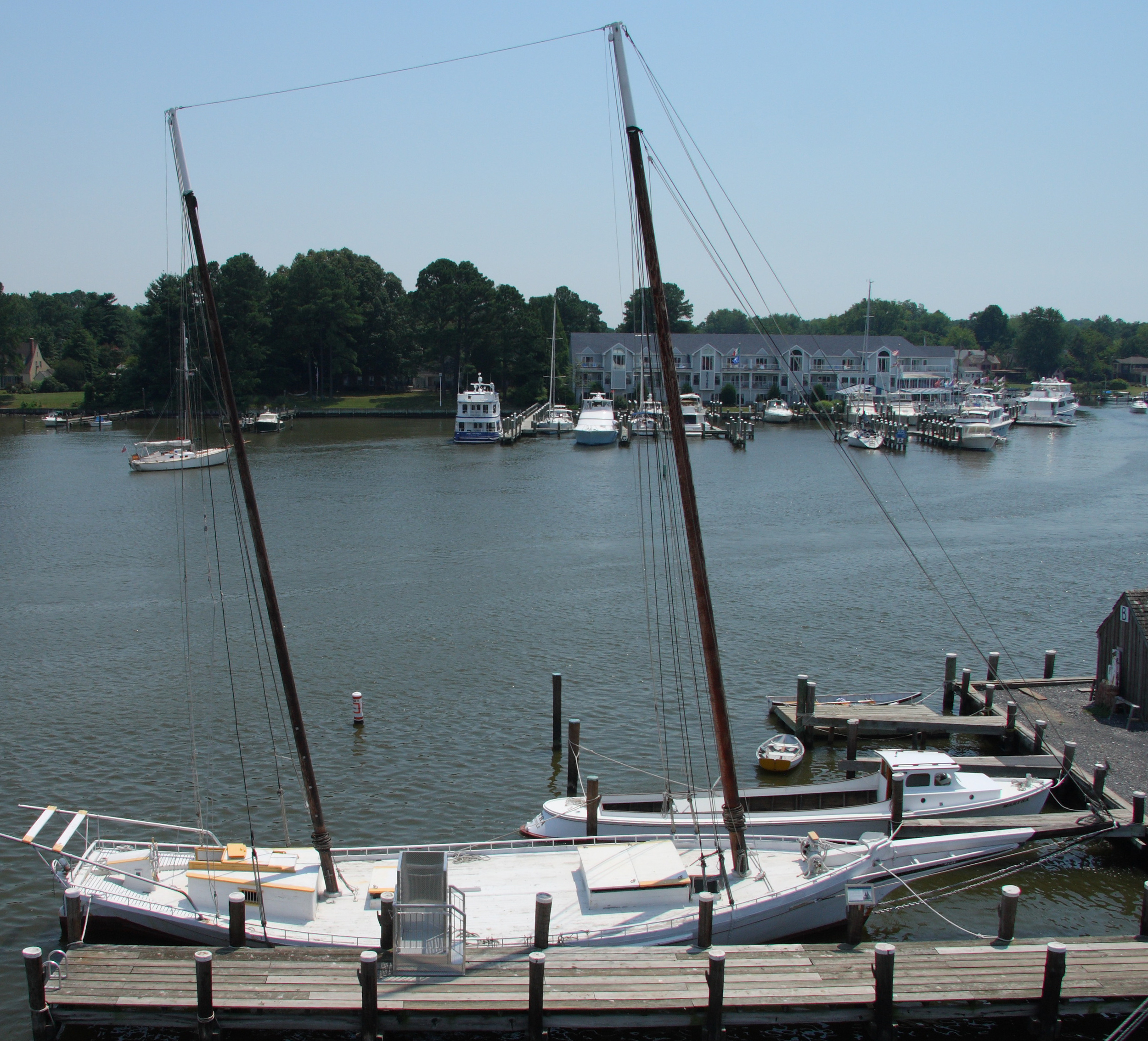
Edna E. Lockwood on display at the Chesapeake Bay Maritime Museum

== Surviving example ==
One of the best examples of the type still in existence is the Edna E. Lockwood, which is on exhibit at the Chesapeake Bay Maritime Museum in Saint Michaels, Maryland. The Lockwood is a nine log bugeye launched on October 5, 1889 at Tilghman Island, Maryland, by John B. Harrison for Daniel Haddaway, at a cost of $2,200. She worked for at least seven sets of owners from 1899 until 1967, and was then sailed as a yacht until donated to the museum in 1973. The museum undertook an extensive restoration of the Lockwood from 1975 through 1979, which restored the bugeye to its 1910 appearance with the "patent stern" that had been added sometime prior to that year. She is the last bugeye retaining the sailing rig and working appearance of the type, and is a National Historic Landmark. Her length is 53 ft-6 in, with a 15 ft-3 in beam and a 2 ft-7 in draft with the centerboard up, and a maximum sail area of approximately 1,700 square feet (160 m^{2}).

== Legacy ==
In the novelette "Angelfish", Lester Dent described the fictional Sail in great detail: "The bugeye Sail was a Chesapeake Bay five-log, thirty-four-feet waterline. She looked to have been built last week, she was sixty-eight years old. Her beam was twelve feet, she drew two feet with the centerboard up." Sail is one of the principal characters described, second only to her owner, named Oscar Sail. Dent owned a bugeye, Albatross, in the mid-1930s, which he used in the Caribbean to look for treasure.

== See also ==
- Fishing vessel
- Sailing ship
- Chesapeake Bay
- Solomons Island, Maryland

== Footnotes ==
1. M.V. Brewington, Chesapeake Bay Bugeyes (Newport News, VA: The Mariners' Museum, 1941), p. 4-8; Howard I. Chapelle, American Small Sailing Craft: Their Design, Development, and Construction (New York: W.W. Norton & Co., 1951), p. 291-294; and Charles H. Kepner, The Edna E. Lockwood (St. Michaels, MD: Chesapeake Bay Maritime Museum, 1979), p. 2-3.
2. Brewington, p. 8-9.
3. Brewington, p. 71-72; and Howard I. Chapelle, Notes on Chesapeake Bay Skipjacks (St. Michaels, MD: Chesapeake Bay Maritime Museum), Introduction.
4. Brewington, p. 4-8, 48-49.
