= Pungy =

Type of schooner

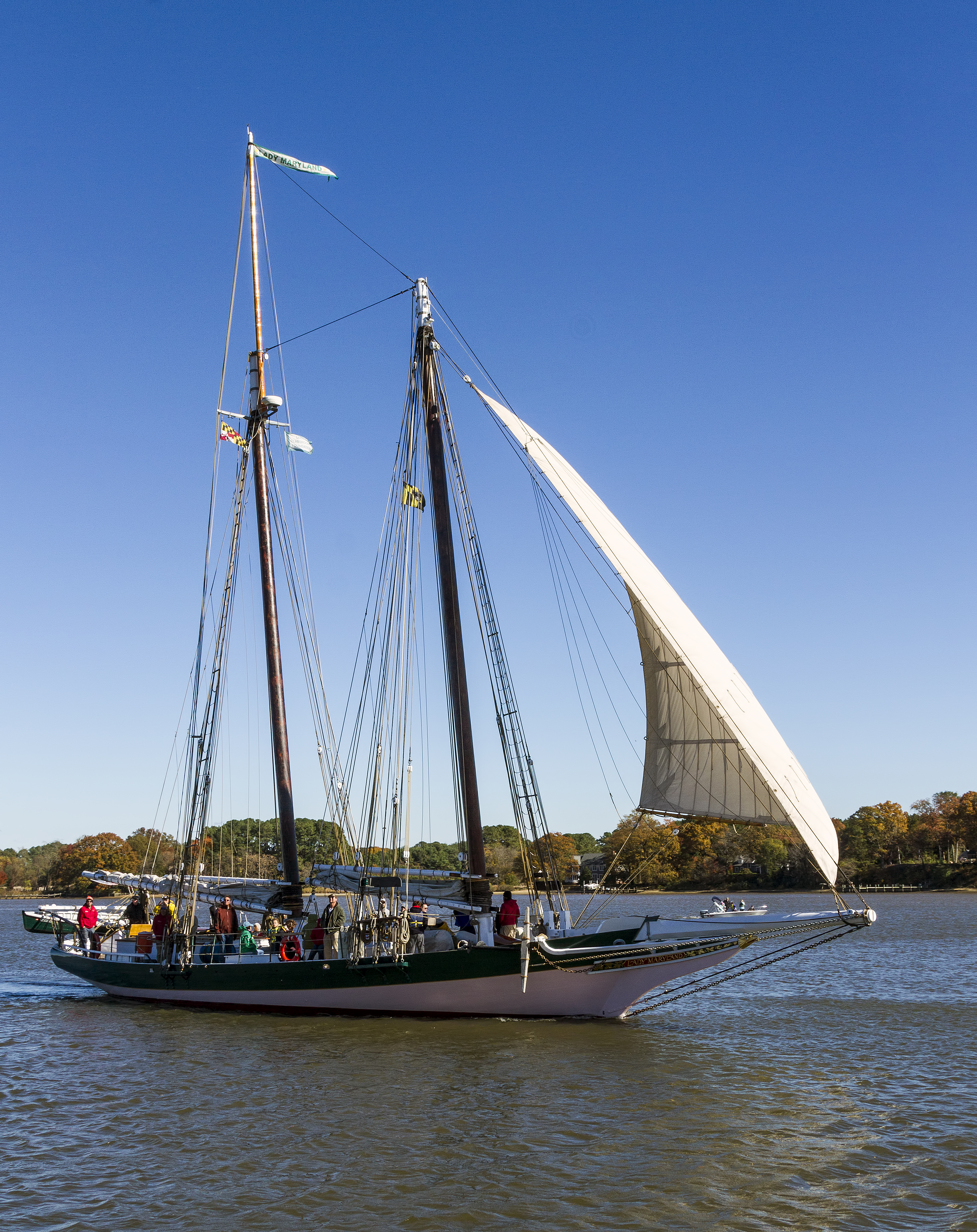
The Lady Maryland pungy schooner

The pungy /ˈpʌŋɡi/ is a type of schooner developed in and peculiar to the Chesapeake Bay region. The name is believed to derive from the Pungoteague region of Accomack County, Virginia, where the design was developed in the 1840s and 1850s.

In form, the pungy is a two-masted gaff-rigged schooner with a main topsail but no square-rigged sails (as found on the related Baltimore clipper). The masts are tall and raked, and there is a bowsprit on the clipper bow. The deck is flush, with a log rail. The hull is framed and has a vee profile. One peculiar detail of the pungy is its traditional paint scheme of green and pink, the origin of which is unknown.

The pungy, like the Baltimore clipper, evolved from the pilot schooner. Its principal usage was to haul freight, particularly perishables ranging from oysters to farm produce. It was capable of ocean travel and was used, for instance, to ship pineapples to Baltimore from Bermuda. It was also used for a time to dredge for oysters, but its excessive draft and large crew complement led to its being replaced by the bugeye. The last pungies were built in the 1880s, and the type's use died out in the first half of the twentieth century.

A replica, the Lady Maryland, was built in 1985–1986 and continues to serve as a floating classroom for The Living Classrooms Foundation.
