= Oystering machinery =

Machinery for oyster farming or fishing

Oystering machinery is machinery used for the farming or fishing of oysters. Various machines are used for the cultivation, harvesting, and transport of oysters.

== History ==
Historically, oysters were harvested by hand using tongs and rakes from natural oyster beds. During the nineteenth century, oyster dredges became widely adopted in commercial fisheries, allowing larger quantities of oysters to be harvested from deeper waters. The growth of oyster aquaculture in the twentieth and twenty-first centuries led to the development of specialized machinery for grading, tumbling, sorting, and handling oysters, increasing the efficiency of commercial oyster production.The Oyster Fishery of the United States. United States Commission of Fish and Fisheries.

== Types of machinery ==
Oystering machinery includes a variety of equipment used in oyster cultivation, harvesting, grading, and processing. Common examples include oyster dredges used in wild fisheries, as well as grading and sorting machines employed in aquaculture operations. Modern oyster farms frequently use tumblers and graders to sort oysters by size, remove fouling organisms, and improve shell shape. Additional equipment such as conveyors, counters, washers, bulk hoppers, and bagging systems are used to automate the handling and processing of oysters before they are transported to market.

== Harvesting machinery ==
A variety of machinery is used to harvest oysters from natural beds and aquaculture operations. Traditional oyster fisheries commonly employ oyster dredges, which are metal-framed nets or baskets towed along the seabed to collect oysters. Modern harvesting operations may also use hydraulic dredges, which direct jets of water into the sediment to loosen oysters before collection. Oyster dredges have been used in commercial fisheries since the nineteenth century and remain among the most widely used harvesting methods in many oyster-producing regions.

== See also ==
- Oyster farming
