= Fishing dredge =

Dredging equipment

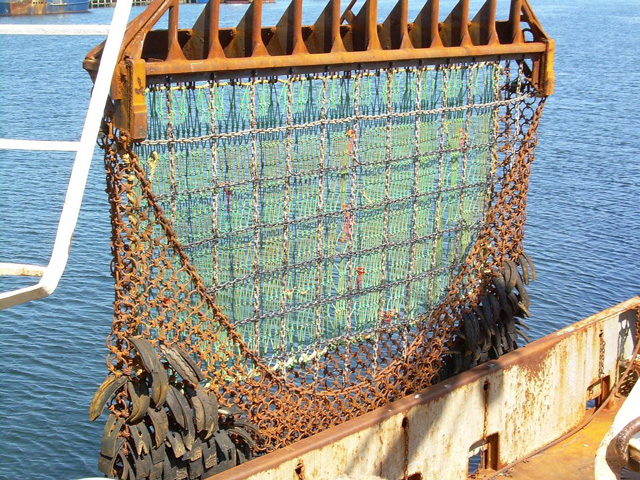
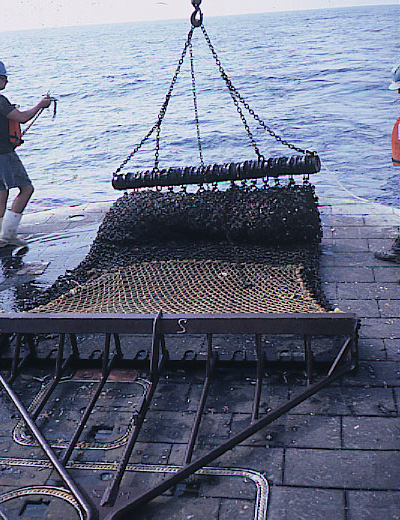
Scallop dredges used by NOAA

A fishing dredge, also known as a scallop dredge or oyster dredge, is a kind of dredge which is towed along the bottom of the sea by a fishing boat in order to collect a targeted edible bottom-dwelling species. The gear is used to fish for scallops, oysters and other species of clams, crabs, and sea cucumber. The dredge is then winched up into the boat and emptied. Dredges are also used in connection with the work of the naturalist in marine biology, notably on the Challenger Expedition.

== Construction ==
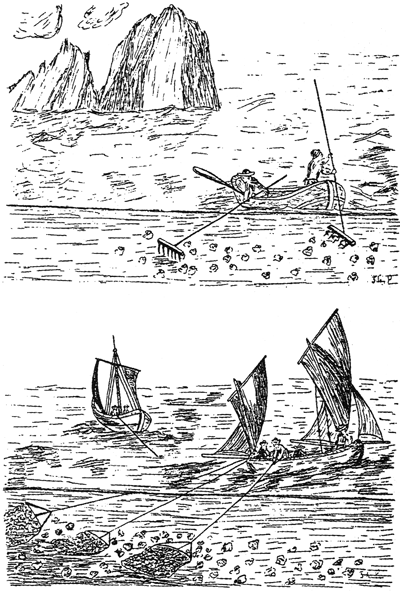
Oyster harvesting using rakes (top) and sail driven dredges (bottom). From L'Encyclopédie of 1771.

The dredge is usually constructed from a heavy steel frame in the form of a scoop. The frame is covered with chain mesh which is open on the front, which is towed. The chain mesh functions as a net.

Dredges may or may not have teeth along the bottom bar of the frame. In Europe, early dredges had teeth, called tynes, at the bottom. These teeth raked or ploughed the sand and mud, digging up buried clams. This design was improved by using spring-loaded teeth that reduced bottom snagging, and so could be used over rough ground. The New Bedford (USA) dredge does not have teeth.

Dredge nets have a coarse mesh in order to let organisms smaller than the target species through. The net catches the larger organisms: in the case of scallop dredging that includes the scallops' predators, such as whelks, starfish and octopus.

In some cases, several dredges are attached to a wheeled rigid axle in groups of three or four. A number of these dredges can be towed from a heavy spreading bar, usually one from each side of the vessel. The length of the bar and number of dredges towed depends on the power of the vessel and the room on the side deck for working the dredges. The number might be three on each side of a small 10-metre (33 ft) boat up to 20 on each side for a 30-metre (98 ft) vessel with 1500 hp. The great weight and strength of the gear can disturb the ground it is towed over, overturning rocks and dislodging and crushing organisms in its path.

There is still a challenge for inventors to produce a more gentle scallop dredge.

== Types of dredgers ==
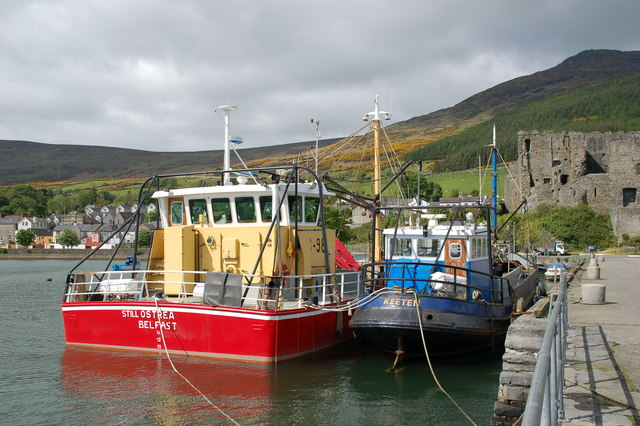
Mussel dredgers

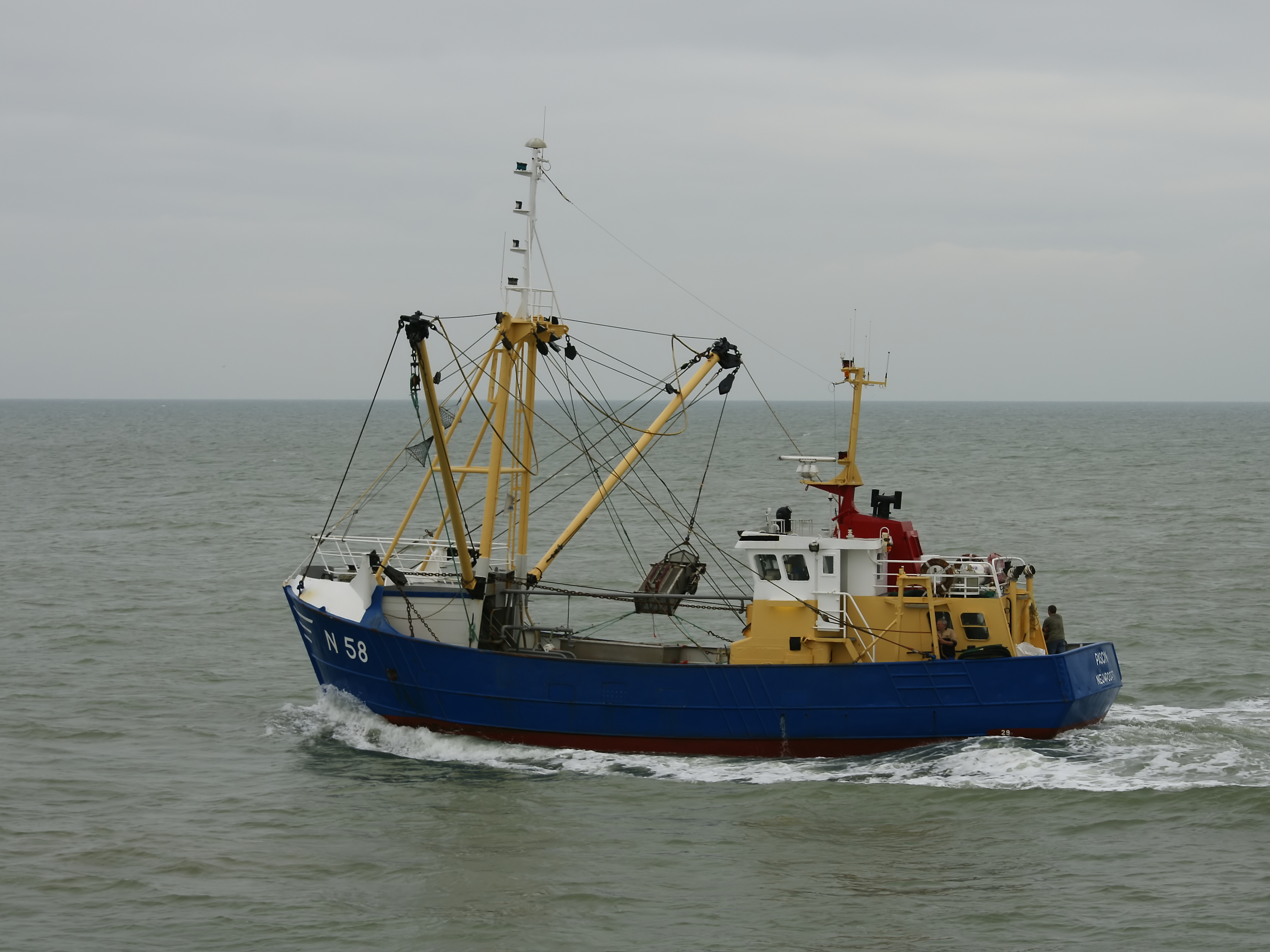
Fishing vessel equipped with a benthic dredge, leaving the port of Nieuwpoort

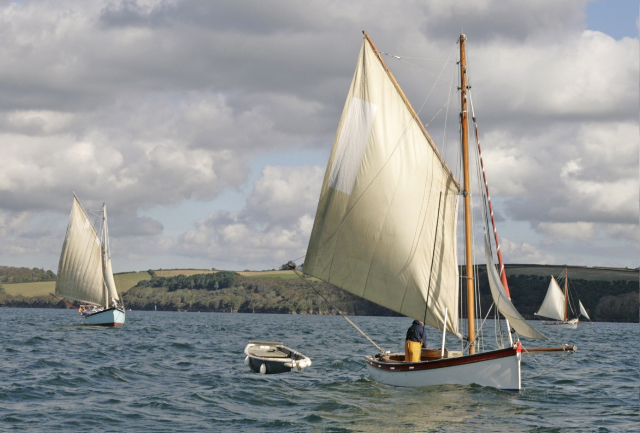
Oyster boats of the Truro oyster fleet. This fishery is the last in the world to work by sail alone

== Dredging history ==
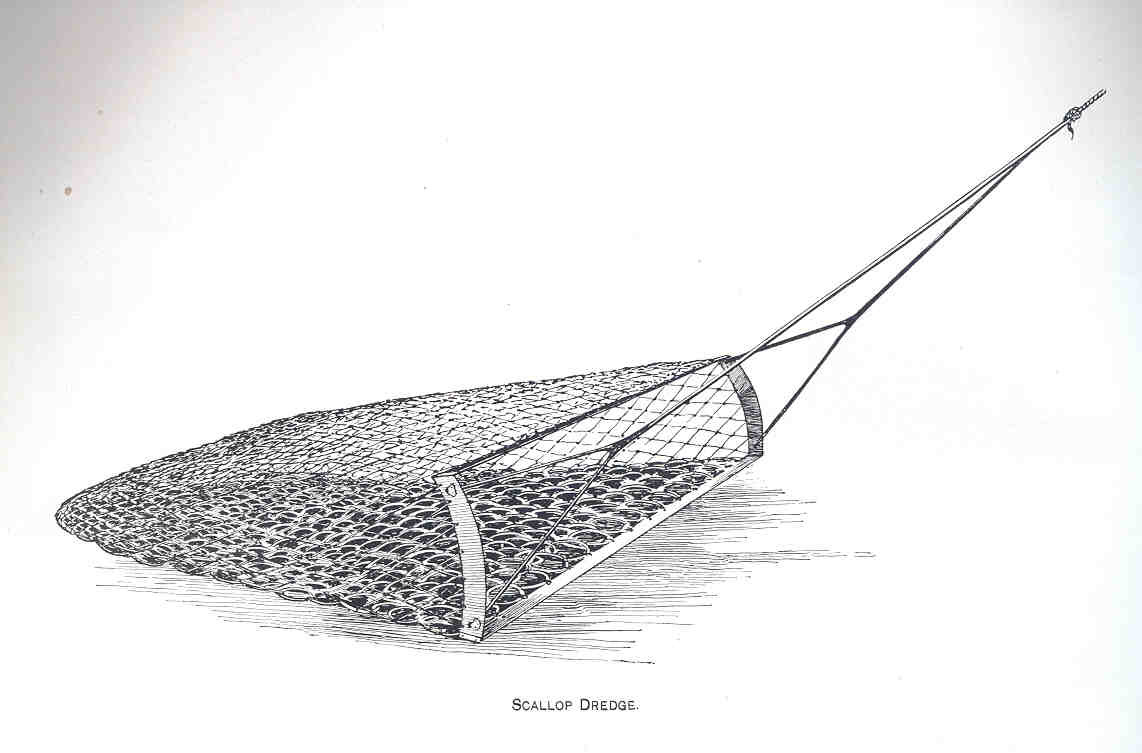
Scallop dredge, 1889

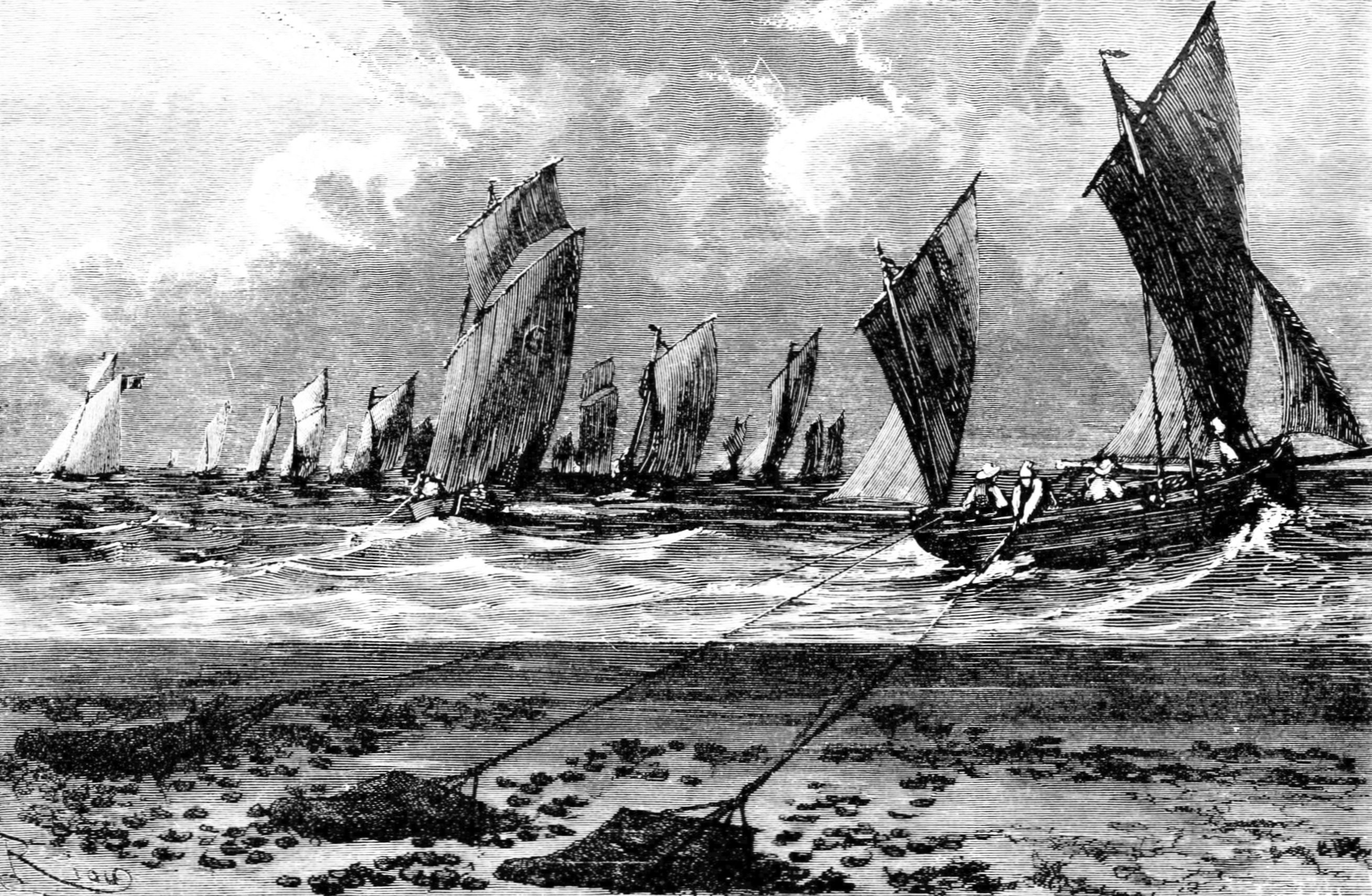
Vessels dredging for oysters, c. 1875

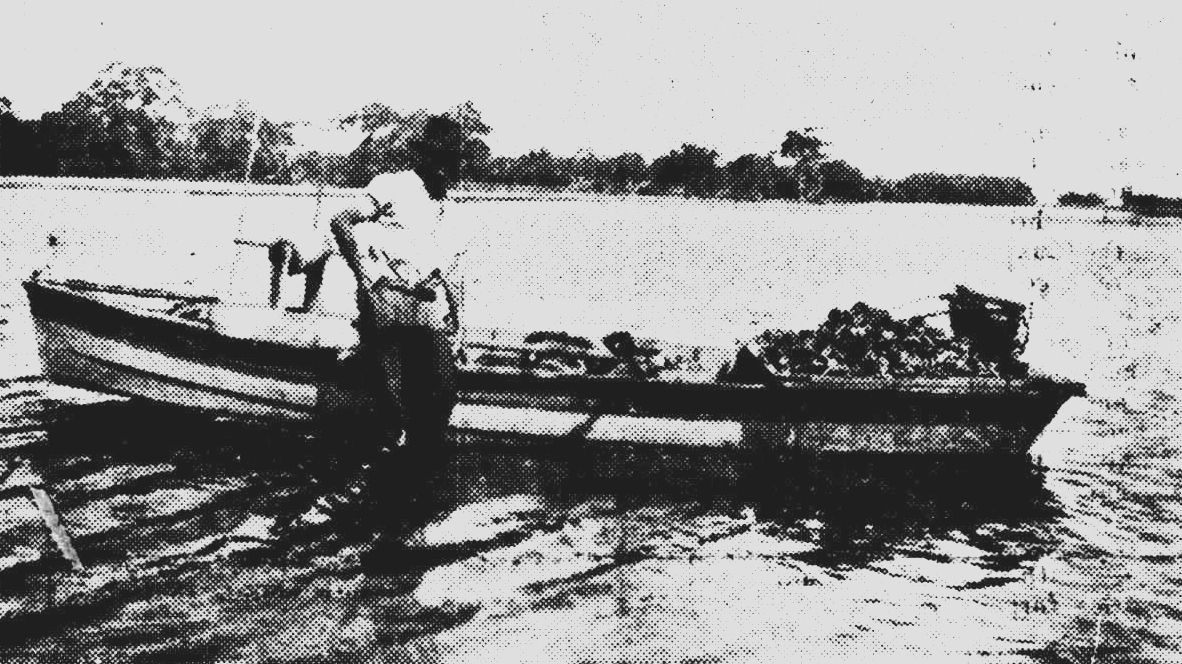
Rare photograph of an oyster dredging boat, used in Australian estuaries (Ballina, NSW, 1926)

== Dredging art ==
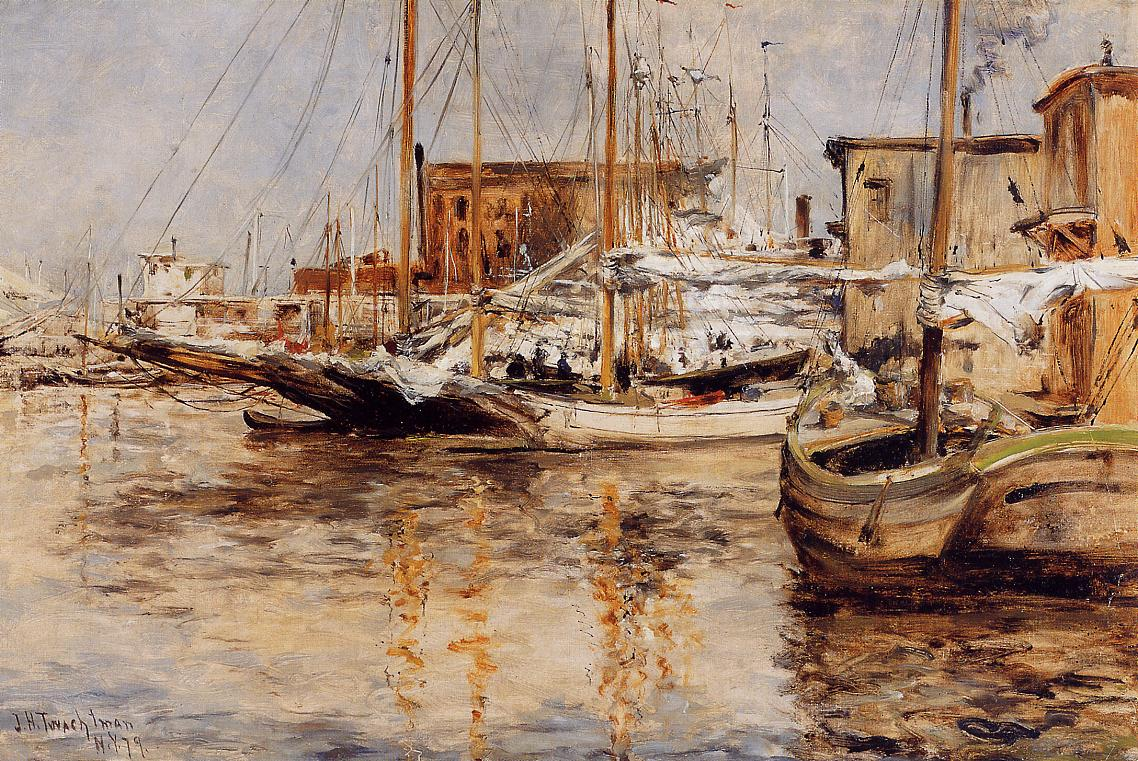
Oyster Boats North River, by John Henry Twachtman (1853–1902)

Oyster Sloop, Cos Cob, by Childe Hassam (c.1902)

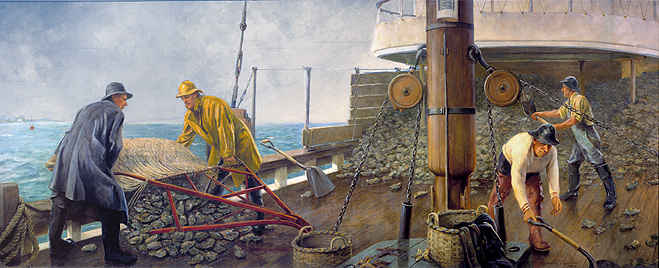
Dredging For Oysters, by Alexander Rummler. WPA mural.

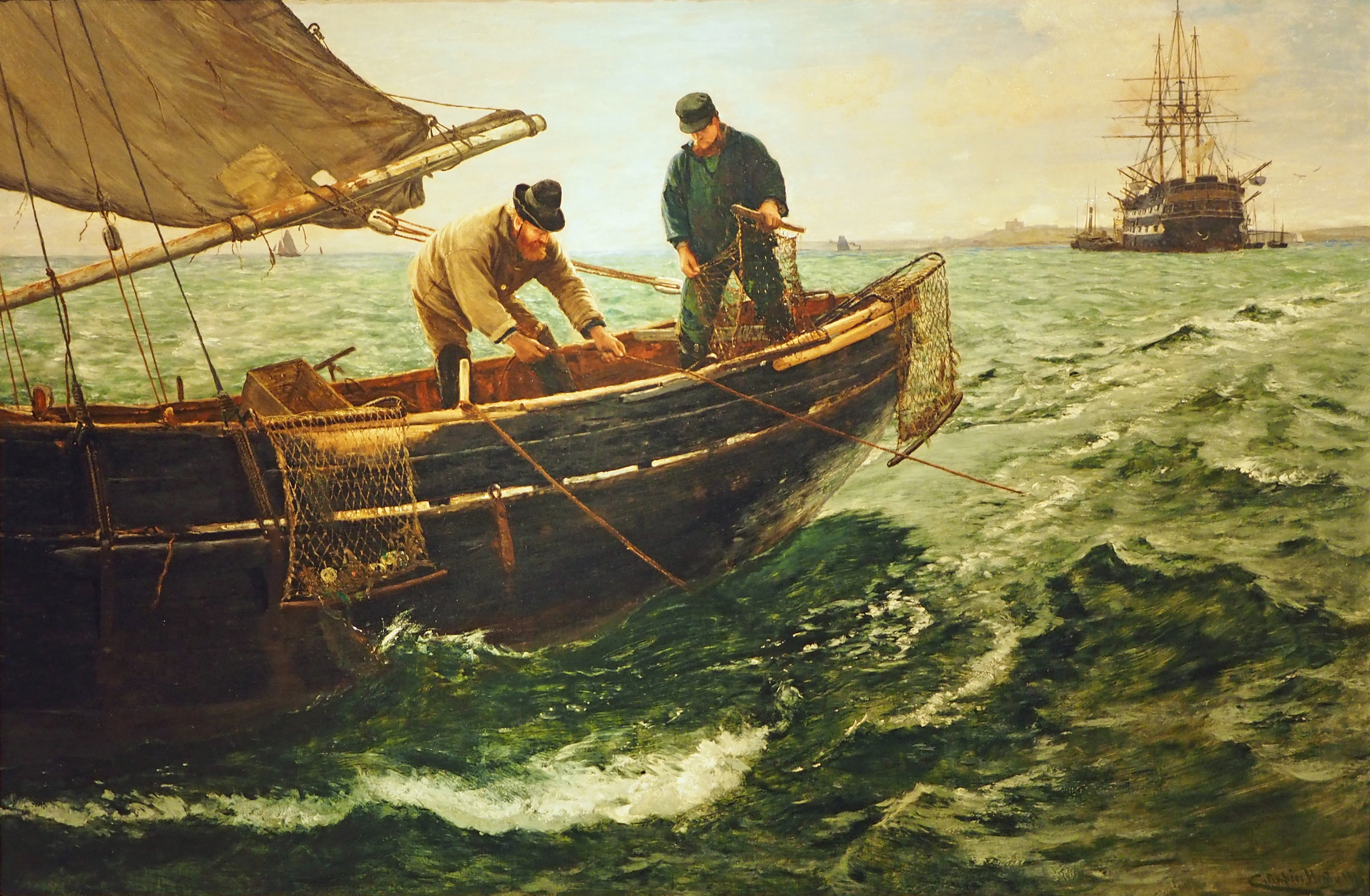
Oyster dredging, by Charles Napier Hemy (1841–1917)

== See also ==
- Bottom trawling – Fishing method by towing a net along the seafloor
- Gathering scallops – Family of shellfish, many edible
- Gathering seafood by hand – Methods for catching sea creatures, especially fish
- Marine biology dredge – Scientific sampling equipment
- Oyster dredging boats:
  - Bugeye – Chesapeake Bay sailboat type for oyster dredging
  - Skipjack – Sailboat type used on Chesapeake Bay for oyster dredging
- Solway Harvester – A scallop dredger
