= Mount Hanley =

Community in Nova Scotia, Canada

Coordinates: 44°58′06″N 65°10′29″W

Mount Hanley in Nova Scotia

Mount Hanley is a community in the Canadian province of Nova Scotia, located in Annapolis County. It is the birthplace of the mariner Joshua Slocum and of Clara Belle Marshall, the first woman to graduate from Acadia University in 1879.

== Geography ==
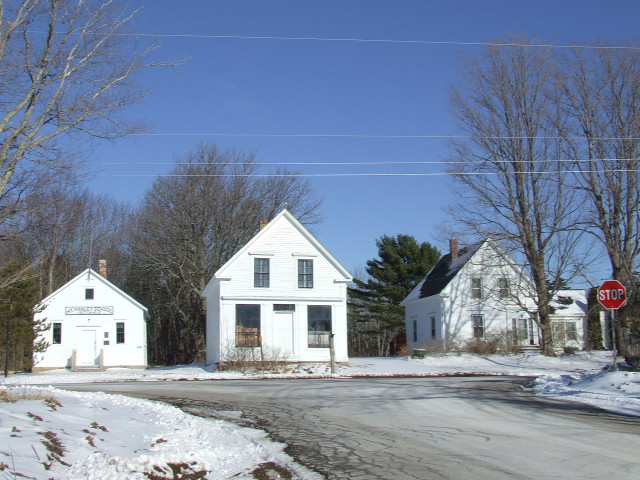
Mount Hanley in Winter

Mount Hanley is located about nine kilometers northwest of the town of Middleton. Mount Hanley occupies the north slope of the North Mountain facing the Bay of Fundy at an elevation of 150 metres above sea level.

== History ==
The community was settled about 1784 mostly by United Empire Loyalists and is thought to be named after Rev. Thomas Hanley Chipman, a leader of the surrounding Wilmot Township. The name is recorded in various sources as Handely, Hanly, and Handly. In the 19th century the community's farms and sawmills prospered, finding ready markets for their goods shipping from the nearby harbours on the Bay of Fundy at Cottage Cove and Port George. The community at one time boasted sawmills, blacksmiths, a grist mill, a cheese factory, blacksmiths, a general store and a post office (1870-1957) At its peak, the village was once described as the "most prosperous and populous in Wilmot Township."

Some agriculture and forestry remain today although most residents work at jobs in the Annapolis Valley or are retired. The population, estimated today at 20 people, is small enough compared to its past that some have identified it as a virtual ghost town.

Joe Banks, part-time epigrapher found a stone with markings in Mount Hanley that he believes are Ogam script and dates from the 5th century AD, evidence he claims of an ancient Irish settlement in Mount Hanley. However archaeologists believe it to be only a toppled property marker and identify the markings as scrapes from plow blades.

== Landmarks ==
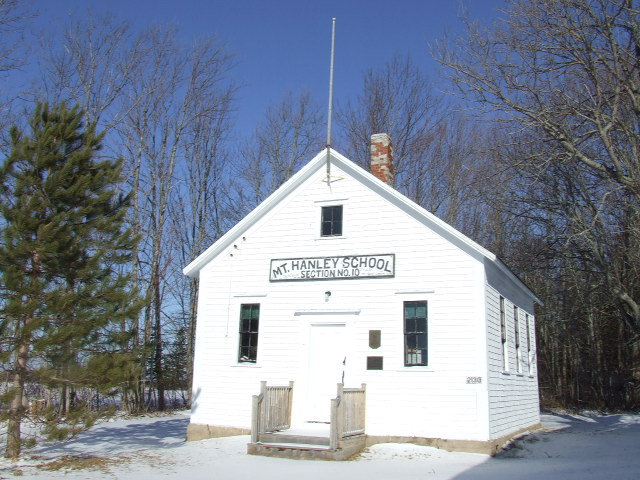
Mount Hanley Schoolhouse

An original log school built in 1784 was replaced in 1850 and served until 1963 when rural schools were consolidated. The school is now the Mount Hanley Schoolhouse Museum and is a provincially registered heritage property, noted as being an early example of architecture based on John William Dawson's pamphlet "School architecture - abridged from Barnard's School architecture."

A Baptist church built in 1861 still sees seasonal services. Mount Hanley shares close links with the adjacent North Mountain communities of Outram, Port George and Moshers Corner and the four communities share a Recreational Centre at Port George.

== Notable residents ==
Mount Hanley was the birthplace on February 20, 1844 of Joshua Slocum, the mariner who was the first to sail solo around the world and wrote the classic book Sailing Alone Around the World. Slocum learned to read and write at Mount Hanley School where today his origins are commemorated by a plaque and displays at the Mount Hanley Schoolhouse Museum. While at Mount Hanley, Slocum had his first experiences on the water on short schooner voyages from the nearby coves of Cottage Cove and Port George. He left Mount Hanley when he was eight years old when his family moved to Brier Island.

Mount Hanley is also the birthplace of Clara Belle Marshall, the first woman to graduate from Acadia University in 1879.

The English-born singer and actor Noel Harrison lived in there in the 1970s and named his 1979 album Mount Hanley Song after the community.
