= Health and usage monitoring systems =

Data-driven vehicle safety and reliability monitoring

Health and usage monitoring systems (HUMS) is a generic term given to activities that utilize data collection and analysis techniques to help ensure availability, reliability and safety of vehicles. Activities similar to, or sometimes used interchangeably with, HUMS include condition-based maintenance (CBM) and operational data recording (ODR). This term HUMS is often used in reference to airborne craft and in particular rotor-craft – the term is cited as being introduced by the offshore oil industry after a commercial Chinook crashed in the North Sea, killing all but one passenger and one crew member in 1986.

HUMS technology and regulation continues to be developed.

HUMS are now used not only for safety but for a number of other reasons including

- Maintenance: reduced mission aborts, fewer instances of aircraft on ground (AOG), simplified logistics for fleet deployment
- Cost: “maintain as you fly” maintenance flights are not required. Performing repairs when the damage is minor increases the aircraft mean time before failure (MTBF) and decreases the mean time to repair (MTTR)
- Operational: improved flight safety, mission reliability and effectiveness
- Performance: improved aircraft performance and reduced fuel consumption

Recent advances in the technology include predictive algorithms providing Remaining Useful Life estimates of components and automated wireless data transfer from the aircraft via WiFi or Cellular.

== See also ==
- Condition-based maintenance of rotating machinery by vibration analysis
