= Sailing Alone Around the World =

1900 sailing memoir by Joshua Slocum

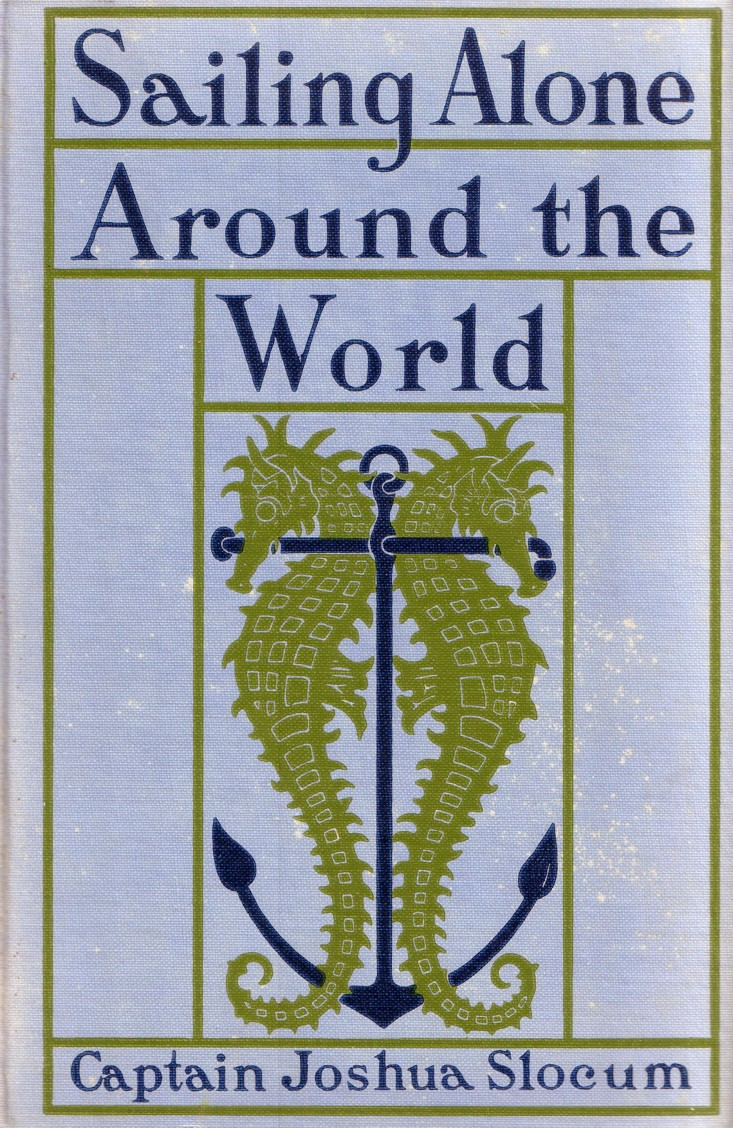
- Original cover
- Author: Joshua Slocum
- Language: English
- Genre: Autobiography, sailing memoir
- Publisher: The Century Company
- Publication date: March 24, 1900
- Publication place: Canada
- ISBN: 978-1-59308-303-8
- Text: Sailing Alone Around the World at Wikisource

Sailing Alone Around the World is a sailing memoir by Joshua Slocum published in 1900 about his single-handed global circumnavigation aboard the sloop Spray. Slocum was the first person to sail around the world alone. The book was an immediate success and highly influential in inspiring later travelers.

== Background ==
Captain Joshua Slocum was a highly experienced navigator and ship owner. He rebuilt and refitted the derelict sloop Spray in a seaside pasture at Fairhaven, Massachusetts, over 13 months between early 1893 and 1894.

Between 24 April 1895 and 27 June 1898, Slocum, aboard the Spray, crossed the Atlantic twice (to Gibraltar and back to South America), negotiated the Strait of Magellan, and crossed the Pacific. He went on to visit Australia and South Africa before crossing the Atlantic (for the third time) to return to Massachusetts after a journey of 46,000 miles.

== The book ==
Slocum attracted considerable international interest by his journey, particularly once he had entered the Pacific. He was awaited at most of his ports of call, and gave lectures and lantern-slide shows to well-filled halls. His journal was first published in installments before being issued in book form in 1900. The book was lavishly illustrated.

Slocum tells his story as a sequence of adventures, understating his own part and giving credit always to the Spray. He invents a crew-member, a supposed pilot of Columbus' Pinta, to take credit for the safety of the vessel while he sleeps.

The trip itinerary was as follows: Fairhaven, Boston, Gloucester, Nova Scotia, Azores, Gibraltar (Morocco), Canary Islands, Cape Verde Islands, Pernambuco, Rio de Janeiro, Maldonado, Montevideo, Buenos Aires, Strait of Magellan, Cockburn Channel, Port Angosto, Juan Fernandez, Marquesas, Samoa, Fiji, Sydney, Melbourne, Tasmania, Cooktown, Christmas Island, Cocos (Keeling) Islands, Rodrigues, Mauritius, Durban, Cape Town, (Transvaal), St Helena, Ascension Island, Devil's Island, Trinidad, Grenada, Newport, Fairhaven.

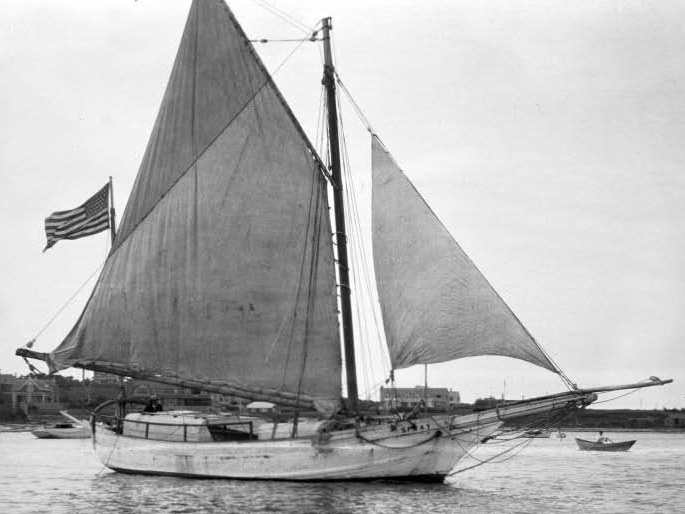
The Spray

Highlights of the journey included perils of sailing blue water, such as fog, gales, danger of collision, loneliness, doldrums, navigation, fatigue, gear failure. Other perils of coastal navigation included pirates, attack by 'savages' [sic], embayment, shoals and coral reefs, stranding, and shipwreck.

Passing by Tierra del Fuego, he was warned that he might be attacked by the indigenous Yahgan Indians in the night, so he sprinkled tacks on the deck. He was awakened in the middle of the night by yelps of pain. He was proud of resourcefully defending himself.

He devised a system of lashing the wheel into what a later era might call a kind of mechanical autopilot. He took pride in the fact that the Spray sailed 2000 miles west across the Pacific without his once touching the helm.

== 1950s attempt to recreate Slocum's voyage ==
In the mid-1950s, Robert Carr of Monkton, Vermont, built a replica of the Spray using the shipbuilding methods of the late 1800s. He announced his intention to sail around the world recreating Slocum's voyage. While one article reported the replica Spray and Carr's announcement, there is no documented evidence that he made a circumnavigation.
