= Imc FAMOS =

imc FAMOS

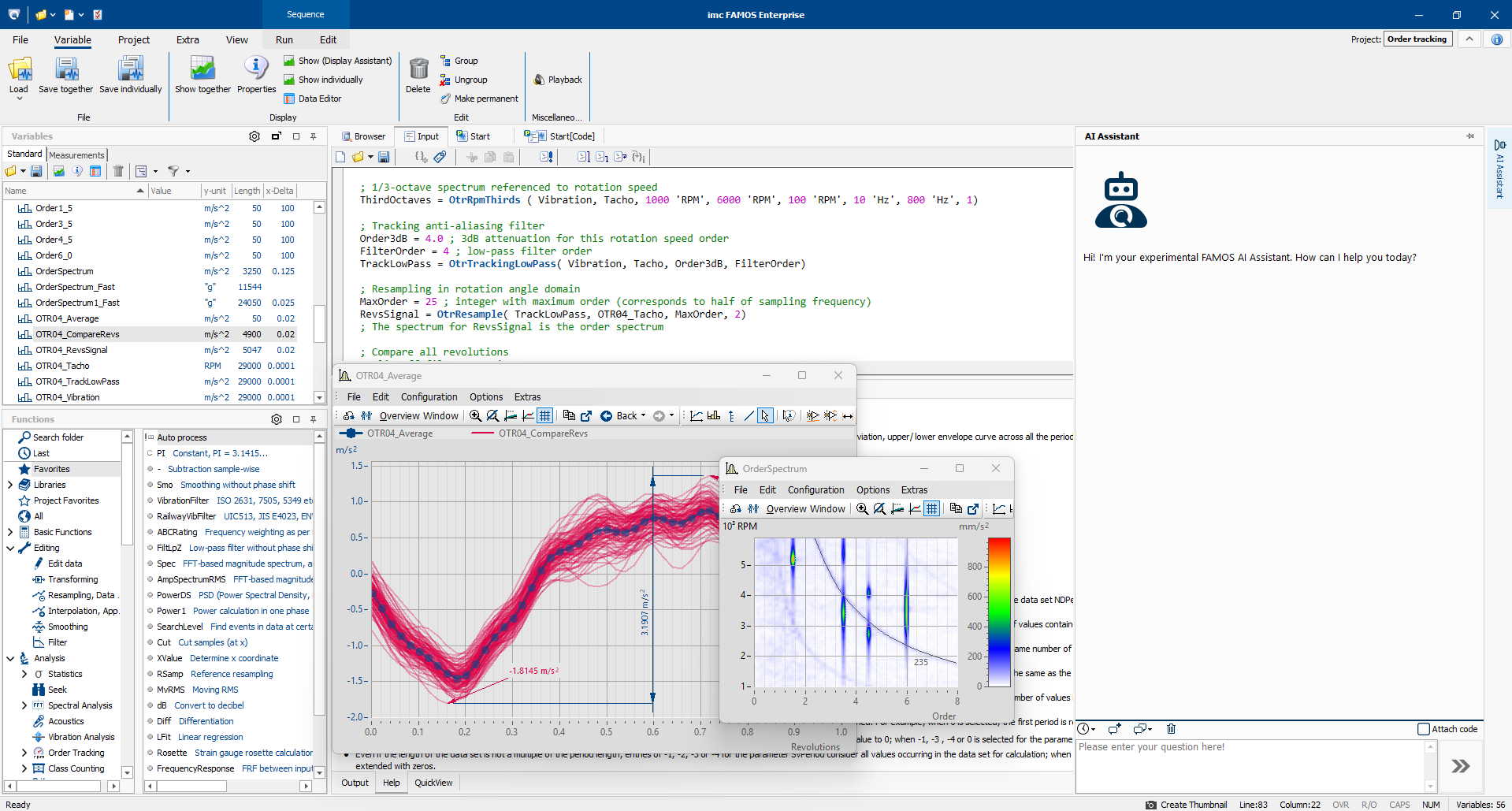
- Developers: imc Test & Measurement
- Release: 1987
- Stable release: 2026 R1 / April 2026
- Operating system: Windows
- Available in: German, English, Japanese, French, Chinese, Korean
- Type: data analysis
- License: Trialware
- Website: imcfamos.com

FAMOS (short for fast analysis and monitoring of signals) is a software for post-processing test & measurement data in time and frequency domain, and visually displaying measurement results. The program was introduced in 1987 by the German company imc Test & Measurement GmbH (integrated measurement & control) in Berlin for Windows. According to its manufacturer, FAMOS offers high speed display and processing of data sets of any size.

== Import of a wide variety of data formats ==
FAMOS can import data from different file formats, e.g. Excel, Binary, TDMS or ASCII files. With a file assistant, it is also possible to create different import filters. It is possible to present the data in different graphical ways. The information can be combined, labeled and processed. FAMOS is able to store data in a proprietary as well as in ASCII or Excel format.

== Data analysis ==
Imported data can be processed with a variety of mathematical operations, either manually or in automated procedures. These include:

- Digital filters, smoothing, frequency weighting of vibration signals according to ISO 8041:2005 and ISO 5349-1
- FFT spectrum, STFT with windowing functions and overlapping, frequency response
- Human exposure to mechanical vibrations
- Acoustic signal analysis like sound pressure level calculation, LAeq and LAFmax
- Statistical analysis like moving average
- Order tracking to analyze data from rotating machines, like order spectrum or order line calculations

FAMOS offers expansion modules for synchronized display of data and video sequences and for the ASAM-ODS data model. It is also possible to play data back audibly with the PC sound card.

== Documentation ==
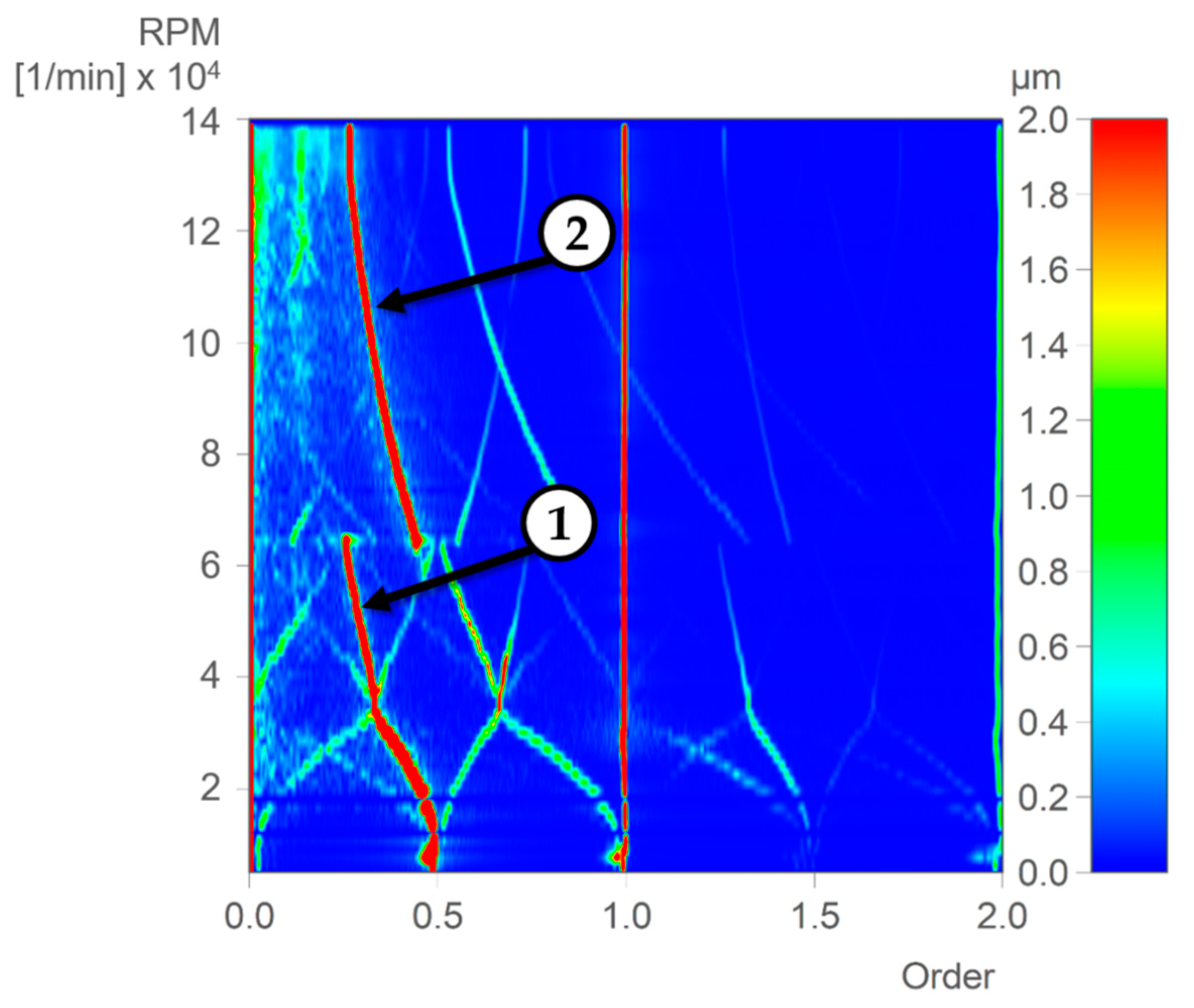
Colomap order spectrum of a displacement sensor during a turbocharger run-up

For reviewing raw data or documenting analysis results, data can be plotted using the "curve window". A number of display styles are available like:

- Amplitude vs. time
- XY and scatter plot, e.g. force vs. displacement, amplitude vs. RPM or traction coefficient vs. angle of attack
- Frequency spectrum plot
- 3D / waterfall plot
- Color map and contour plot

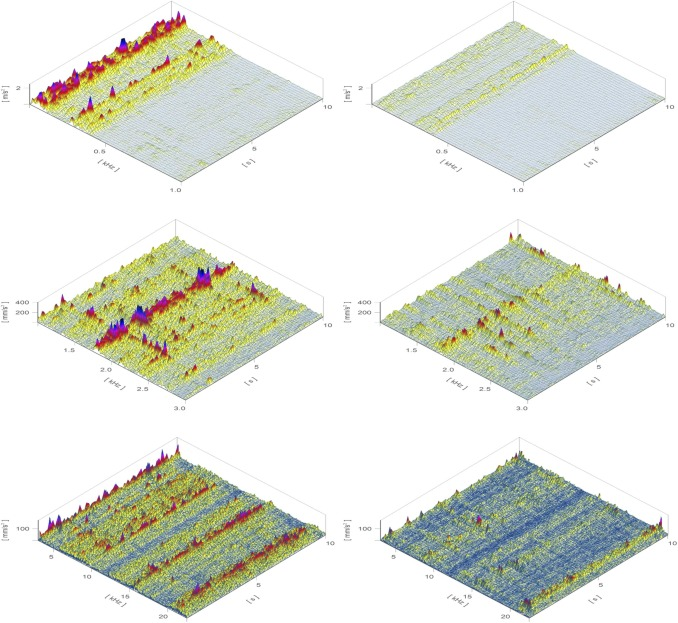
3D spectrograms of a vibroacoustic acceleration sensor in experimental soil field operations

To highlight events in the data, markers can be placed in the plots that automatically display the respective values of x and y coordinates. Markers can also be used to document time differences between events.

Graphs can be exported to be embedded in office documents or PDF files as PNG or EMF vector graphics.

== Literature (German language) ==
- 20 Jahre imc und ADDITIVE, sensor report 4/2008
- FAMOS 6.0 - Mehr als nur Signalanalyse, Physik Journal 6/2008
- Neue Software-Version für die Analyse von Messsignalen, ATZ 4/2008
- Signalanalyse für den Messtechniker, TECHNICA 23-24/2005
- Signalanalysesoftware mit neuen Funktionen, Maschinenmarkt 17/2008
- Wie ein Taschenrechner, MSR Magazin 11/2002
- FAMOS - Taschenrechner für die Meßtechnik, Addison-Wesley, 1997, ISBN 3-8273-1255-8
