= Joshua Slocum =

19th-century Canadian-American seaman; first to circumnavigate the world solo

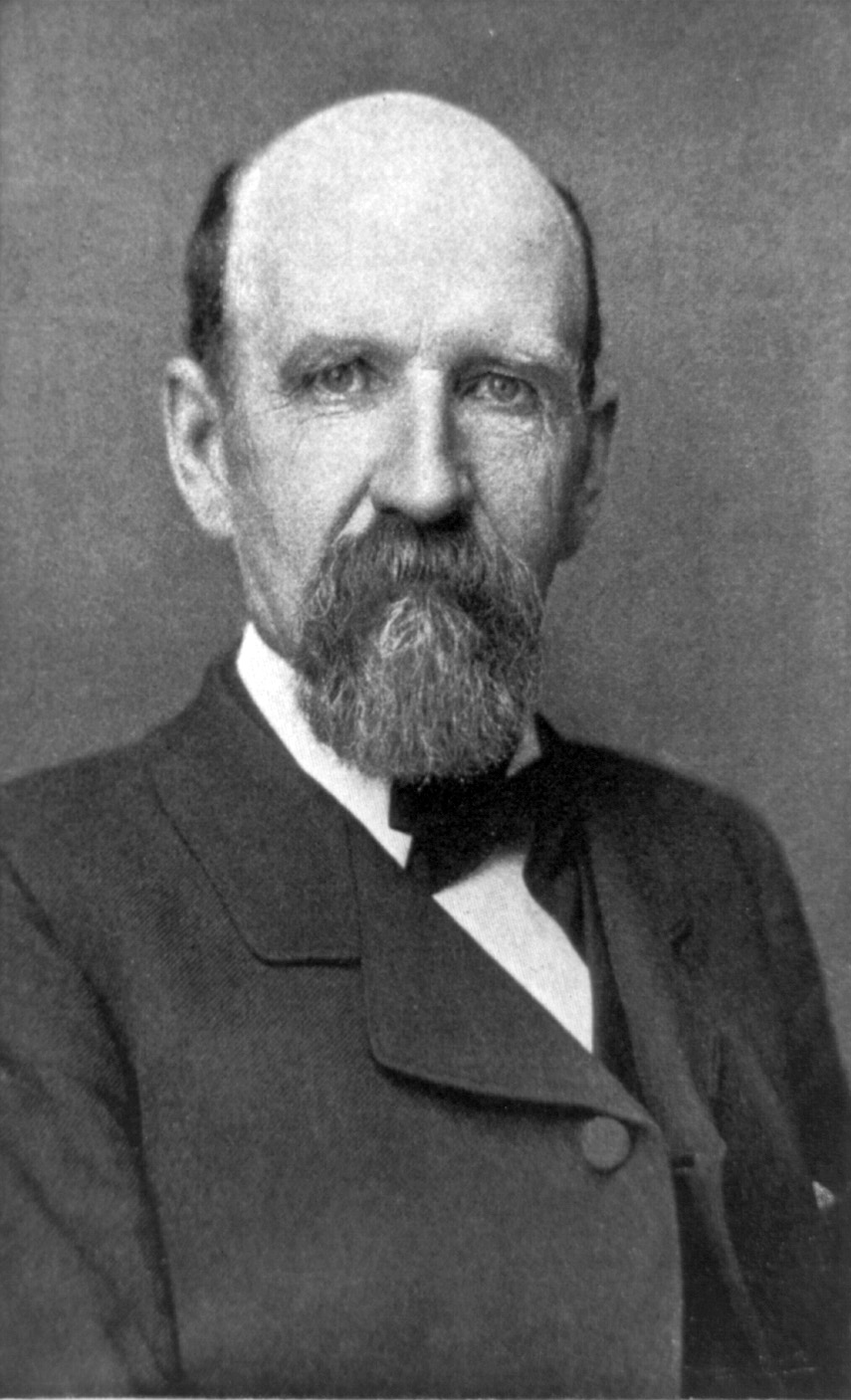
- From The Century Magazine, Sept. 1899
- Born: Joshua Slocomb; February 20, 1844; Mount Hanley, Nova Scotia
- Disappeared: November 14, 1909 (aged 65); At sea
- Known for: First solo circumnavigation of the world (1895–1898)
- Spouse(s): Virginia Albertina Walker (m. 1871–1884), Henrietta Slocum (m. 1886–1909)
- Children: Victor Slocum; Benjamin Slocum; Jessie Slocum; James Slocum
- Parent(s): John Slocomb; Sarah Southern
- Relatives: Joshua Slocum (Grandfather)

Joshua Slocum (February 20, 1844 – on or shortly after November 14, 1909) was the first person to sail single-handedly around the world. He was a Nova Scotian-born, naturalised American seaman and adventurer, and a noted writer. In 1900 he wrote a book about his journey, Sailing Alone Around the World, which became an international best-seller. He disappeared in November 1909 while aboard his boat, the Spray.

== Nova Scotian childhood ==
Joshua Slocum was born on February 20, 1844, in Mount Hanley, Annapolis County, Nova Scotia (officially recorded as Wilmot Station), a community on the North Mountain within sight of the Bay of Fundy. The fifth of eleven children of John Slocomb and Sarah Jane Slocombe née Southern, Joshua descended, on his father's side, from a Quaker known as "John the Exile", who left the United States shortly after 1780 because of his opposition to the American War for Independence. As part of the Loyalist migration to Nova Scotia, the Slocombes were granted 500 acres (2.0 km^{2}) of farmland in Nova Scotia's Annapolis County.

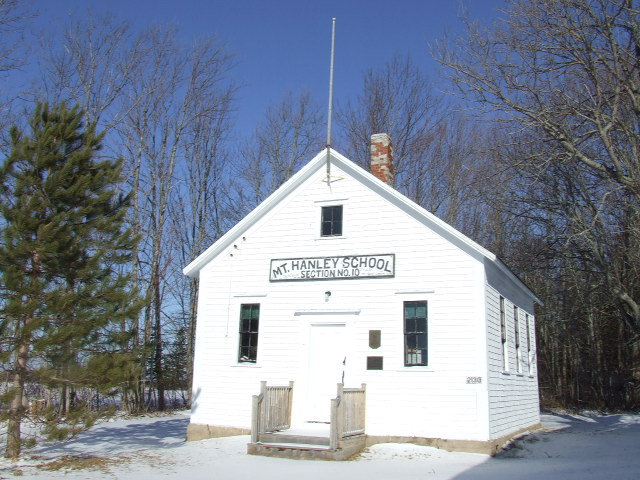
Slocum's childhood school, now the Mount Hanley Schoolhouse Museum

Joshua Slocum was born in the family's farmhouse in Mount Hanley and learned to read and write at the nearby Mount Hanley School. His earliest ventures on the water were made on coastal schooners operating out of the small ports such as Port George and Cottage Cove near Mount Hanley along the Bay of Fundy.

When Joshua was eight years old, the Slocomb family (Joshua changed the spelling of his last name later in his life) moved from Mount Hanley to Brier Island in Digby County, at the mouth of the Bay of Fundy. Slocum's maternal grandfather was the keeper of the lighthouse at Southwest Point there. His father, a stern man and strict disciplinarian, took up making leather boots for the local fishermen, and Joshua helped in the shop. However, the boy found the scent of salt air much more alluring than the smell of shoe leather. He yearned for a life of adventure at sea, away from his demanding father and his increasingly chaotic life at home among so many brothers and sisters.

He made several attempts to run away from home, finally succeeding, at age fourteen, by hiring on as a cabin boy and cook on a fishing schooner, but he soon returned home. In 1860, after the birth of the eleventh Slocombe child and the subsequent death of his kindly mother, Joshua, then sixteen, left home for good. He and a friend signed on at Halifax as ordinary seamen on a merchant ship bound for Dublin, Ireland.

== Early life at sea ==
From Dublin, he crossed to Liverpool to become an ordinary seaman on the British merchant ship Tangier (also recorded as Tanjore), bound for China. During two years as a seaman he rounded Cape Horn twice, landed at Batavia (now Jakarta) in the Dutch East Indies, and visited the Maluku Islands, Manila, Hong Kong, Saigon, Singapore, and San Francisco. While at sea, he studied for the Board of Trade examination, and, at the age of eighteen, he received his certificate as a fully qualified Second Mate. Slocum quickly rose through the ranks to become a Chief Mate on British ships transporting coal and grain between the British Isles and San Francisco.

In 1865, he settled in San Francisco, became an American citizen, and, after a period spent salmon fishing and fur trading in the Oregon Territory of the northwest, he returned to the sea to pilot a schooner in the coastal trade between San Francisco and Seattle. His first blue-water command, in 1869, was the barque Washington, which he took across the Pacific, from San Francisco to Australia, and home via Alaska.

He sailed for thirteen years out of the port of San Francisco, transporting mixed cargo to China, Australia, the Spice Islands, and Japan. Between 1869 and 1889 he was the master of eight vessels, the first four of which (the Washington, the Constitution, the Benjamin Aymar and the Amethyst) he commanded in the employ of others. Later, there would be four others that he himself owned, in whole or in part.

== Family at sea ==
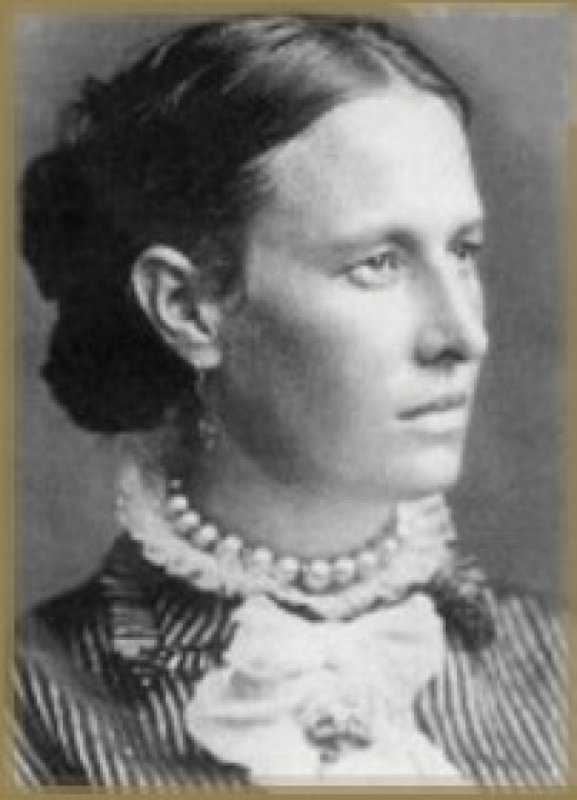
Virginia Albertina Walker

On 9 January 1871, Slocum and the Constitution put in at Sydney. There he met, courted, and married Virginia Albertina Walker. They were married on January 31, 1871 and the couple left Sydney on the Constitution the following day. Miss Walker, quite coincidentally, was an American whose New York family had migrated west to California at the time of the 1849 gold rush and eventually continued on, by ship, to settle in Australia. She sailed with Slocum, and, over the next thirteen years, the couple had seven children, all born at sea or foreign ports. Four children, sons Victor, Benjamin Aymar, and James Garfield, and daughter Jessie, survived to adulthood.

In Alaska, the Washington was wrecked when she dragged her anchor during a gale, ran ashore, and broke up. Slocum, however, at considerable risk to himself, managed to save his wife, the crew, and much of the cargo, bringing all back to port safely in the ship's open boats. The owners of the shipping company that had employed Slocum were so impressed by this feat of ingenuity and leadership, they gave him the command of the Constitution which he sailed to Hawaii and the west coast of Mexico.

His next command was the Benjamin Aymar, a merchant vessel in the South Seas trade. However, the owner, strapped for cash, sold the vessel out from under Slocum, and he and Virginia found themselves stranded in the Philippines without a ship.

=== The Pato ===
While in the Philippines, in 1874, under a commission from a British architect, Slocum organized local workers to build a 150-ton steamer in the shipyard at Subic Bay. In partial payment for the work, he was given the ninety-ton schooner, Pato (Spanish for "Duck"), the first ship he could call his own.

Ownership of the Pato afforded Slocum the kind of freedom and autonomy he had never previously experienced. Hiring a crew, he contracted to deliver a cargo to Vancouver in British Columbia. Thereafter, he used the Pato as a general freight carrier along the west coast of North America and in voyages back and forth between San Francisco and Hawaii. During this period, Slocum also fulfilled a long-held ambition to become a writer, and became a temporary correspondent for the San Francisco Bee.

The Slocums sold the Pato in Honolulu in the spring of 1878. Returning to San Francisco, they purchased the Amethyst. He worked this ship until June 23, 1881.

The Slocums next bought a third share in the Northern Light 2. This large clipper was 233 feet in length, 44 feet beam, 28 feet in the hold. It was capable of carrying 2000 tons on three decks. Although Joshua Slocum called this ship "my best command", it was a command plagued with mutinies and mechanical problems. Under troubling legal circumstances (caused by his alleged treatment of the chief mutineer) he sold his share in the Northern Light 2 in 1883.

=== The Aquidneck ===
The Slocum family continued on their next ship, the 326-ton Aquidneck. In 1884, Slocum's wife Virginia became ill aboard the Aquidneck in Buenos Aires and died. After sailing to Massachusetts, Slocum left his three youngest children, Benjamin Aymar, Jessie, and Garfield in the care of his sisters; his oldest son Victor continued as his first mate.

In 1886, at age 42, Slocum married his 24-year-old cousin, Henrietta "Hettie" Elliott. The Slocum family, with the exception of Jessie and Benjamin Aymar, again took to the sea aboard the Aquidneck, bound for Montevideo, Uruguay. Slocum's second wife would find life at sea much less appealing than his first. A few days into Henrietta's first voyage, the Aquidneck sailed through a hurricane. By the end of this first year, the crew had contracted cholera, and they were quarantined for six months. Later, Slocum was forced to defend his ship from pirates, one of whom he shot and killed; following which he was tried and acquitted of murder. Next, the Aquidneck was infected with smallpox, leading to the death of three of the crew. Disinfecting of the ship was performed at considerable cost. Shortly afterward, near the end of 1887, the Aquidneck was wrecked in southern Brazil.

=== The Liberdade ===
After being stranded in Brazil with his wife and sons Garfield and Victor, he started building a boat that could sail them home. He used local materials, salvaged materials from the Aquidneck, and worked with local workers. The boat was launched on May 13, 1888, the very day slavery was abolished in Brazil, and therefore the ship was given the name Liberdade, the Portuguese word for freedom. It was an unusual 35-foot (11 m) junk-rigged design which he described as "half Cape Ann dory and half Japanese sampan". He and his family began their voyage back to the United States, his son Victor (15) being the mate.

After fifty-five days at sea and 5510 miles, the Slocums reached Cape Roman, South Carolina and continued inland to Washington D.C. for the winter and finally reaching Boston via New York in 1889. This was the last time Henrietta sailed with the family. In 1890, Slocum published his accounts of these adventures in Voyage of the Liberdade.

== Voyage of the Destroyer ==
In the northern winter of 1893–94, Slocum undertook what he described as, at that time, being "the hardest voyage that I have ever made, without any exception at all." It involved delivering the steam-powered torpedo boat Destroyer from the east coast of the United States to Brazil.

Destroyer was a ship 130 feet (40 m) in length, conceived by the Swedish-American inventor and mechanical engineer John Ericsson, and intended for the defence of harbours and coastal waters. Equipped in the early 1880s, with sloping armour plate and a bow-mounted submarine gun, it was an evolution of the Monitor warship type of the American Civil War. Destroyer was intended to fire an early form of torpedo at an opposing ship from a range of 300 feet (91 m), and was a "vessel of war partially armored to attack bows-on at short range."

Despite the loss of the Aquidneck, and the privations of his family's voyage in the self-built Liberdade, Slocum retained a fondness for Brazil. During 1893, Brazil was faced with a political crisis in Rio Grande do Sul, and an attempt at civil war that was intensified by the revolt of the country's navy in September.

Slocum agreed to a request by the Brazilian government to deliver the Destroyer to Pernambuco, Brazil, with financial and vindictive motives. As Slocum describes, his contract with the commander of government forces at Pernambuco was, "to go against the rebel fleet, and sink them all, if we could find them – big and little – for a handsome sum of gold ..." Slocum also saw the possibility of getting even with the "arch rebel" Admiral Melo (of whom he writes as "Mello"): "Confidentially: I was burning to get a rake at Mello and his Aquideban. He it was, who in that ship expelled my bark, the Aquidneck, from Ilha Grande some years ago, under the cowardly pretext that we might have sickness on board. But that story has been told. I was burning to let him know and palpably feel that this time I had in dynamite instead of hay".

Towed by the Santuit, Slocum and a small crew aboard the Destroyer left Sandy Hook, New Jersey, on 7 December 1893. The following day the ship was already taking on water: "A calamity has overtaken us. The ship's top seams are opening and one of the new sponsons, the starboard one, is already waterlogged." Despite all hands pumping and bailing, by midnight the seas were extinguishing the fires in the boilers which were kept alight only by throwing on rounds of pork fat and tables and chairs from the vessel.

With a storm continuing to blow on the 9th, the crew was able to lower the level of water in the hold and plug some of the holes and leaks. The bailing out of water, using a large improvised canvas bag, continued from the 9th to the 13th and succeeded in maintaining the level of water in the hold below 3 feet (1 m). On the 13th they were again hit by a storm and cross seas and had to bail all night. On the 14th, heavy seas disabled the rudder. By the afternoon of 15 December, the Destroyer was to the south-west of Puerto Rico, heading for Martinique, and still weathering storms.

By that time, with the fires in the boilers extinguished, all hands were bailing for their lives: "The main hull of the Destroyer is already a foot (30cm) under water, and going on down". The crew had no other option than to keep bailing and try to keep the ship afloat, as the vessel "could not be insured for the voyage; nor would any company insure a life on board". By the morning of the 16th the storm had abated, allowing the Destroyer to anchor to the south of Puerto Rico.

Although the ship's best steam pump had been put out of action on 19 December, more favourable seas allowed the crew to reach Martinique, where repairs were made before again setting sail on 5 January 1894. On 18 January, the Destroyer arrived at Fernando de Noronha, an island some 175 miles (280 km) from the coast of Brazil, before finally reaching Recife, Pernambuco, on the 20th. Slocum wrote: "My voyage home from Brazil in the canoe Liberdade, with my family for crew and companions, some years ago, although a much longer voyage was not of the same irksome nature."

At Pernambuco, the Destroyer joined up with the Brazilian navy and the crew was again engaged in repairs as the long tow in heavy seaways had severed rivets at the bow, resulting in leaks. Wet powder led to a failed test-firing of the submarine gun and the ship was grounded to remove the projectile. But the strain of the swell led to a further leak. Following further repairs, the Destroyer made for Bahia with replenishments of powder for the Brazilian fleet, arriving on 13 February. Once there, however, Admiral Gonçalves of the Brazilian navy seized the ship. At the Arsenal at Bahia, an apparently incompetent alternative crew grounded the Destroyer on a rock in the basin. The vessel was holed and subsequently abandoned.

== The Spray: First solo circumnavigation of the earth ==
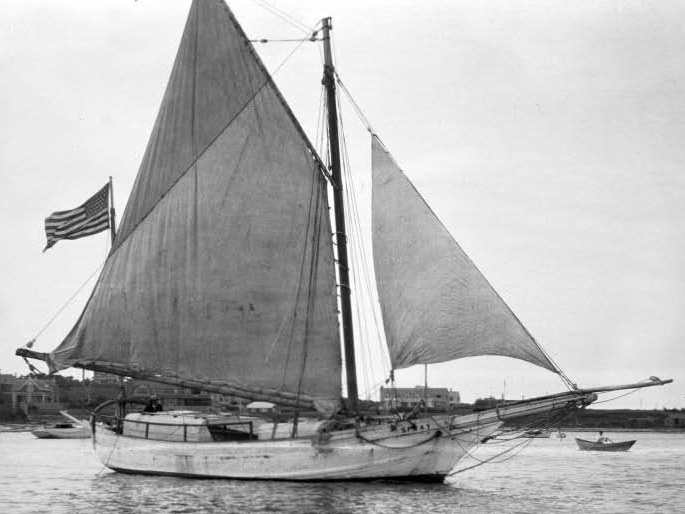
The Spray

Slocum rebuilt the 36 ft 9 in (11.2 m) gaff rigged sloop oyster boat named Spray in Fairhaven, Massachusetts, during 1891 and 1892. On June 21, 1892, he launched the painstakingly rebuilt vessel.

On April 24, 1895, he set sail from Boston, Massachusetts. In his famous book, Sailing Alone Around the World, now considered a classic of travel literature, he described his departure in the following manner:

I had resolved on a voyage around the world, and as the wind on the morning of April 24, 1895 was fair, at noon I weighed anchor, set sail, and filled away from Boston, where the Spray had been moored snugly all winter. The twelve o'clock whistles were blowing just as the sloop shot ahead under full sail. A short board was made up the harbor on the port tack, then coming about she stood to seaward, with her boom well off to port, and swung past the ferries with lively heels. A photographer on the outer pier of East Boston got a picture of her as she swept by, her flag at the peak throwing her folds clear. A thrilling pulse beat high in me. My step was light on deck in the crisp air. I felt there could be no turning back, and that I was engaging in an adventure the meaning of which I thoroughly understood.

After an extended visit to his boyhood home at Brier Island and visiting old haunts on the coast of Nova Scotia, Slocum departed North America at Sambro Island Lighthouse near Halifax, Nova Scotia, on July 3, 1895.

Slocum intended sailing eastward around the world, using the Suez Canal, but when he got near Gibraltar he realized that sailing through the southern Mediterranean would be too dangerous for a lone sailor because piracy was still prevalent there at the time. So he decided to sail westward, in the southern hemisphere. He headed to Brazil, and then to the Straits of Magellan. At that point he was unable to start across the Pacific for forty days because of a storm. Eventually, he made his way to Australia, sailed north along its east coast, crossed the Indian Ocean, rounded the Cape of Good Hope, and then headed back to North America.

Slocum navigated without a chronometer, instead relying on the traditional method of dead reckoning to establish longitude, which required only a cheap tin clock for approximate time, and used noon-sun sights for latitude. On one long passage in the Pacific, he also famously shot a lunar distance observation, decades after those observations had ceased to be commonly employed, which allowed him to check his longitude independently. However, Slocum's primary method for finding longitude was still dead reckoning, and he recorded only one lunar observation during the entire circumnavigation.

Slocum normally sailed the Spray without touching the helm. Due to the length of the sail plan relative to the hull, and the long keel, the Spray was capable of self-steering (unlike faster modern craft), and he balanced it stably on any course relative to the wind by adjusting or reefing the sails and by lashing the helm fast. He sailed 2,000 miles (3,200 km) west across the Indian Ocean without once touching the helm.

More than three years later, on June 27, 1898, he returned to Newport, Rhode Island, having circumnavigated the world and sailing a distance of more than 46,000 miles (74,000 km). Slocum's return went almost unnoticed. The Spanish–American War, which had begun two months earlier, dominated the headlines but, after the end of major hostilities, many American newspapers published articles describing Slocum's adventure.

=== Sailing Alone Around the World ===
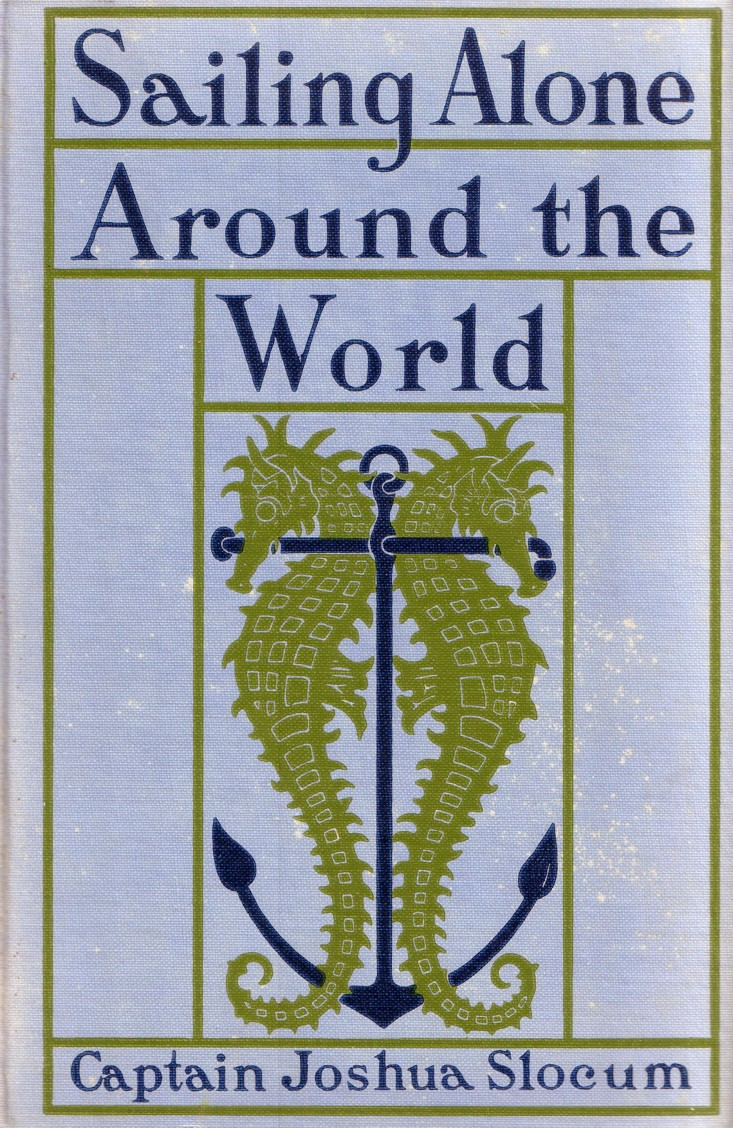
Original cover 1900.

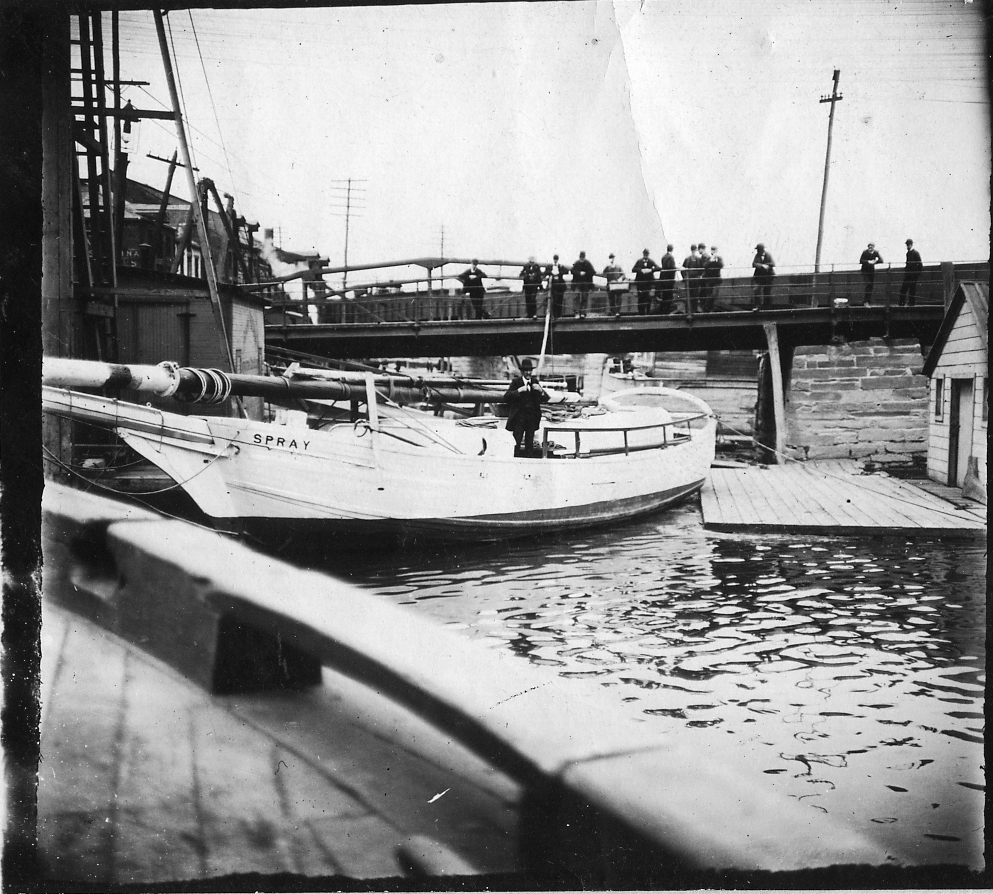
Spray being hauled up the Erie Canal to the Pan-American Exposition in Buffalo 1901.

In 1899, he published his account of the voyage in Sailing Alone Around the World, first serialized in The Century Magazine and then in several book-length editions. Reviewers received the slightly anachronistic age-of-sail adventure story enthusiastically. Arthur Ransome went so far as to declare: "Boys who do not like this book ought to be drowned at once." In his review, Sir Edwin Arnold wrote, "I do not hesitate to call it the most extraordinary book ever published."

Slocum's book deal was an integral part of his journey. His publisher had provided Slocum with an extensive on-board library, and Slocum wrote several letters to his editor from distant points around the globe. His Sailing Alone won him widespread fame in the English-speaking world, and he was one of eight invited speakers at a dinner in honor of Mark Twain in December 1900. Slocum hauled the Spray up the Erie Canal to Buffalo, New York, for the Pan-American Exposition in the summer of 1901, and he was well compensated for participating in the fair.

== Later life ==
In 1901, Slocum's book revenues and income from public lectures provided him enough financial security to purchase a small farm in West Tisbury, on the island of Martha's Vineyard, in Massachusetts. After a year and a half, he found he could not adapt to a settled life and he sailed the Spray from port to port in the northeastern US during the summer and in the West Indies during the winter, lecturing and selling books wherever he could. Slocum spent little time with his wife on Martha's Vineyard and preferred life aboard the Spray, usually wintering in the Caribbean. In 1902 he was arrested in Riverton, New Jersey, on a charge of raping a twelve-year-old girl who had taken a public tour of the Spray. It emerged that the girl had not been assaulted but that Slocum may have exposed himself to her, though he said that he had no memory of the incident. He pleaded no contest to the reduced charge of indecent exposure and spent over a month in jail.

Slocum and the Spray visited Sagamore Hill, the estate of US President Theodore Roosevelt on the north shore of Long Island, New York. Roosevelt and his family were interested in the tales of Slocum's solo circumnavigation. The President's young son, Archie, along with a guardian, spent the next few days sailing with Slocum up to Newport aboard the Spray, which, by then, was a decrepit, weather-worn vessel. Slocum again met with President Roosevelt in May 1907, this time at the White House in Washington. Supposedly, Roosevelt said to him, "Captain, our adventures have been a little different." Slocum answered, "That is true, Mr. President, but I see you got here first."

By 1909, Slocum's funds were running low; book revenues had tailed off. He prepared to sell his farm on Martha's Vineyard and began to make plans for a new adventure in South America. He had hopes of another book deal.

== Disappearance ==
On November 14, 1909, Slocum set sail in the Spray from Vineyard Haven, Massachusetts, for the West Indies on one of his usual winter voyages. He had also expressed interest in starting his next adventure, exploring the Orinoco, Rio Negro and Amazon Rivers. Slocum was never heard from again. In July 1910, his wife informed the newspapers that she believed he was lost at sea.

Despite being an experienced mariner, Slocum never learned to swim and considered learning to swim to be useless. Many mariners shared this thought, as swimming would only be useful if land was extremely close by.

In 1924, Joshua Slocum was declared legally dead.

== Legacy ==
Slocum's achievements have been well publicised and honoured. The name Spray has become a choice for cruising yachts ever since the publication of Slocum's account of his circumnavigation. Over the years, many versions of Spray have been built from the plans in Slocum's book, more or less reconstructing the sloop with various degrees of success.

Similarly, the French long-distance sailor Bernard Moitessier christened his 39-foot (12 m) ketch-rigged boat Joshua in honor of Slocum. It was this boat that Moitessier sailed from Tahiti to France, and he also sailed Joshua in the 1968 Sunday Times Golden Globe Race around the world, making good time, only to abandon the race near the end and sail on to the Polynesian Islands.

Ferries named in Slocum's honour (Joshua Slocum and Spray) served the two Digby Neck runs in Nova Scotia between 1973 and 2004. The Joshua Slocum was featured in the film version of Dolores Claiborne.

An underwater glider – an autonomous underwater vehicle (AUV), designed by the Scripps Institute of Oceanography, was named after Slocum's ship Spray. It became the first AUV to cross the Gulf Stream, while operated by the Woods Hole Oceanographic Institution. Another AUV has been named after Slocum himself: the Slocum Electric Glider, designed by Douglas Webb of Webb Research (since 2008, Teledyne Webb Research).

In 2009, a Slocum glider, modified by Rutgers University, crossed the Atlantic in 221 days. The RU27 traveled from Tuckerton, New Jersey, to Baiona, Pontevedra, Spain – the port where Christopher Columbus landed on his return from his first voyage to the New World. Like Slocum himself, the Slocum glider is capable of traveling over thousands of kilometers. These gliders continue to be used by various research institutions, including Texas A&M University's Department of Oceanography and Geochemical and Environmental Research Group (GERG), to explore the Gulf of Mexico and other bodies of water.

A monument to Slocum exists on Brier Island, Nova Scotia, not far from his family's boot shop. In 2026, a replica of the boot shop was created as a historic site on the island by the Joshua Slocum Society. He is commemorated in museum exhibits at the New Bedford Whaling Museum in Massachusetts, the Maritime Museum of the Atlantic in Halifax, Nova Scotia, and the Mount Hanley Schoolhouse Museum near his birthplace. Several biographies about Slocum are published.

A newly discovered plant in Mauritius was named after him while he was visiting. According to Slocum, "Returning to the Spray by way of the great flower conservatory near Moka, the proprietor, having only that morning discovered a new and hardy plant, to my great honor named it 'Slocum'". Slocum himself discovered an island by accident, and named it Alan Erric Island. During World War II, a liberty ship was named after Slocum, launched from South Portland, Maine in December 1944 and scrapped in 1965. The naming of Slocums River in Dartmouth, Massachusetts has sometimes been falsely attributed to Joshua Slocum, but the river was actually named after an unrelated Slocum family in the 17th century.

Slocum was inducted into the National Sailing Hall of Fame in 2011.

== See also ==
- Harry Pidgeon, first to solo circumnavigate via the Panama Canal
- List of people who disappeared at sea

== Bibliography ==
- Berthold, Dennis A., ed. (2005). "Introduction". Sailing Alone Around the World. New York: Barnes & Noble. xiii–xxxvi. ISBN 978-1-59308-303-8.
- Slocum, Joshua (2005) [1899]. Sailing Alone Around the World. New York: Barnes & Noble. ISBN 978-1-59308-303-8.
- Slocum, Joshua (1890) [1890]. Voyage of the Liberdade. Boston: Robinson & Stephenson.
- Slocum, Victor (2001) [1950]. Capt. Joshua Slocum: The Life and Voyages of America's Best Known Sailor. Dobbs Ferry, NY: Sheridan House. ISBN 0-924486-52-X.
- Grayson, Stan (2017). A Man for All Oceans – Captain Joshua Slocum and the First Solo Voyage Around the World. Tilbury House Publishers and the New Bedford Whaling Museum. p. 401. ISBN 978-0-88448-548-3.
