= Condition-based maintenance of rotating machinery by vibration analysis =

Vibration analysis of rotating machinery

Condition-based maintenance of rotating machinery by vibration analysis is an industrial and research field focused on maintaining complex rotating equipment based on its real-time condition, determined through the analysis of its vibration signatures.

Complex machinery, such as helicopters, trains, and wind turbines, is very costly to maintain. In many critical applications, a mechanical failure can result in severe financial losses and catastrophic safety hazards, including the loss of life. Traditionally, the maintenance of complex machinery has relied on preventive maintenance. In this approach, maintenance operations and part replacements are scheduled at regular, often short, intervals regardless of the machine's actual condition, aiming to keep the probability of failure extremely low. However, this imposes some major challenges: maintenance costs are exceptionally high, and unexpected failures can still occur between maintenance intervals. Furthermore, in some cases, the invasive nature of the maintenance operation itself can inadvertently introduce new faults into the system. To address these limitations, condition-based maintenance dictates that a machine is serviced based on its actual physical condition. The condition of the machinery is actively monitored and analyzed and maintenance is executed only when the data indicates a developing fault.

Rotating components are integral to many complex mechanical systems. For such equipment, broadly referred to as rotating machinery, vibration analysis is highly beneficial for implementing condition-based maintenance, as mechanical faults manifest clearly and are relatively easy to distinguish within the vibration signature. Vibration analysis algorithms are well established for detecting and classifying faults in rotating components, such as bearings and gears. These algorithms can pinpoint the exact faulty component by utilizing mechanical specifications such as component geometries. Fault detection and classification are typically performed simultaneously. The core principle involves isolating the vibration signature of each individual component and tracking features that are characteristic of specific fault behaviors. When these features exceed a predefined threshold, a fault is detected, and its source is inherently classified since the monitoring process relies on the prior separation of signals for each specific component.

== Angular resampling ==
Block diagram of angular resampling. Top: Shaft speed is integrated to find shaft phase, determining new sample times with constant angular increments. Bottom: A time-domain signal is resampled into the cycle domain, correcting for speed variations.

Even under controlled laboratory conditions, the rotational speed of a shaft is rarely perfectly constant. Minor speed fluctuations (e.g., deviations of just 1% from the mean speed) cause the vibration frequencies of the rotating component to smear across the spectrum. Consequently, this spectral smearing makes it difficult to isolate the component's signal from the vibrations of other rotating parts.

To address this challenge, angular resampling, also known as Order tracking (signal processing), is applied. The shaft speed is either measured directly or extracted from the vibration signal itself. The vibration signal is then resampled to synchronize the data with the rotational angle of the shaft rather than with time. This mathematical mapping can be implemented in several ways, but it generally involves three main stages: calculating the phase (or angle) of the shaft as a function of time, computing a new time vector that maintains a constant angular interval between consecutive samples, and resampling the vibration signal according to this new time vector.

Effects of angular resampling. Top: An accelerating shaft causes frequency smearing in the spectrum (b). Bottom: Resampling standardizes the wave period per round (c), concentrating the energy into a sharp peak in the order domain (d).

As shown in the accompanying example, angular resampling resolves the issue of frequency smearing caused by fluctuating speeds, transforming these smeared frequencies into sharp, distinct peaks within the angular-resampled spectrum (known as order).

== Synchronous averaging ==
Most rotating components in industrial machinery can be classified into two primary operational categories: synchronous components, such as gears, and semi-synchronous components, such as rolling element bearings. Synchronous components rotate in perfect synchronization with the shaft, making their vibration pattern completely deterministic. Conversely, semi-synchronous components inherently exhibit small operational variations, slipping slightly relative to the shaft (typically experiencing roughly 1% slippage) due to the kinematic interactions of the rolling elements. While time synchronous averaging is used to cleanly extract the phase-locked vibrations of synchronous components, isolating semi-synchronous component signatures requires extracting a residual signal to filter out dominant synchronous mesh interferences.

Block diagram of synchronous averaging. A continuous vibration signal is separated into individual period segments. These segments are then time-aligned and averaged together to produce a clean, noise-reduced synchronous average.

At its core, synchronous averaging, known also as time synchronous averaging, is a straightforward but powerful discrete signal processing operation. After the raw vibration data undergoes angular resampling to correct for subtle speed variations, the signal is divided into consecutive segments corresponding to complete shaft rotations. Averaging these segmented vectors together leverages destructive interference to attenuate random wideband noise and isolate the target component. This process systematically eliminates background interferences from other rotating assemblies whose operational speeds are not integer multiples of the referenced shaft speed.

Synchronous averaging extracts a target signal from a noisy measurement. Top: The Measured signal (blue) combines target, interference, and noise. Bottom: Averaging 1 to 100 segments filters out noise and isolates the clean target waveform.

Synchronous averaging is strongly related to the estimation of the signal using the mean squared error metric. Concerning a set of data segments extracted from a continuous vibration record, the mathematical framework of the mean squared error metric dictates that the standard arithmetic average inherently acts as the specific signal configuration that is closest to all other segments. Consequently, the process of dividing an angularly resampled vibration signal into consecutive blocks representing complete machine rotations and averaging them together can be mathematically defined as a specialized optimization problem. Under this framework, the computed synchronous average serves as the mathematically optimal estimation that minimizes the total mean squared error across all synchronized components within the data ensemble.

== Dephase ==
Dephase is the complement of synchronous averaging. As explained in the synchronous averaging section, when analyzing semi-synchronous components, synchronous averaging can be utilized to filter out the vibrational effects of synchronous components from the signal. This is highly relevant to gears, for example, which produce strong vibrations even under healthy conditions.

A schematic block diagram illustrating the step-by-step processing workflow of the Dephase algorithm for vibration analysis. The raw time-domain signal undergoes angular resampling to correct for variable shaft speeds. The resulting angular-resampled signal is divided into consecutive segments corresponding to complete rounds. A synchronous average is calculated from these segments, concatenated to replicate the continuous record, and subtracted from the segmented raw data to isolate non-synchronous components (such as rolling element bearing signatures). Finally, the residual segments are reassembled and resampled back from the cycle domain to the original time domain.

There are several approaches to filter out the vibrations of synchronous components from the signal, one of which is Dephase. In the Dephase method, for each synchronous component, the signal is first angularly resampled according to its shaft speed, and then the synchronous average is computed for individual sections of the signal. For each section, the calculated synchronous average is periodically extended (concatenated) to match the section's length, and then subtracted from it. Then, the vibrations of the next synchronous component are filtered out using the same approach.

As explained, Dephase relies on two main steps: subtracting the concatenated synchronous average from each section, and separating the signal into smaller sections rather than subtracting the concatenated average from the entire signal at once. The first step is straightforward: the synchronous average is an estimation of the synchronous component's vibration, so subtracting this concatenated average from the signal filters out most of that component's influence. The second step addresses the very slight slippage that may still be present in a synchronous component's signal, which can result from various factors such as inaccuracies in shaft speed measurement. Therefore, dividing the signal into sufficiently short sections enables accurate estimation of the synchronous component's signal based on the synchronous average. There are also other approaches for filtering out synchronous component vibrations, such as cepstrum analysis that 'lifters' out the synchronous components.

== Difference signal ==
The synchronous averaged signal is an estimation of the component's vibration over one rotation. This averaged signal is composed of many frequencies. For gears, the synchronous averaged signal contains strong frequencies at the gear mesh harmonics, even under healthy conditions. To diagnose faults in gears, these harmonics and their sidebands are filtered out to enable a better diagnosis of the fault vibrations. These fault vibrations manifest across a broader range of frequencies and are less concentrated in the gear mesh harmonics compared to the vibrations of a healthy gear. This operation results in the difference signal. The number of sidebands to filter out is a hyper-parameter that can be determined by trial and error, with a typical value of two.

Extracting a difference signal: Synchronous average (top left) is converted to order domain (right). Gear mesh harmonics are filtered out (middle). Residual signal returns to cycle domain, enhancing the fault (bottom).

Comparison of synchronous averages (top) and corresponding difference signals (bottom) for healthy and faulty gear states. While regular gear mesh vibrations dominate and mask localized defects in the standard synchronous averages (a, c, e), calculating the difference signals (b, d, f) eliminates this background meshing signature, clearly exposing and enhancing the impulsive vibration spikes caused by the localized faults.

== Fault detection of gears and rolling element bearings ==
The detection of faults in gears and rolling element bearings shares the same underlying concept: the vibration signal of the component is isolated as much as possible, and then features are extracted from this isolated signal. A fault is then detected relative to the feature values under healthy conditions - for example, if the current value is 3 sigma larger than the average value under healthy conditions. The baseline values for the healthy condition can be measured, for instance, at the beginning of the machine's life or when the relevant rotating component is newly installed. Sometimes, detecting the fault can also indicate the specific fault type, such as an inner race or outer race fault in a bearing.

The fault diagnosis process for rolling element bearings consists of the following steps: First, a Dephasing step is utilized to filter out synchronous vibrations, such as those from gears. Then, the signal is angularly resampled according to the bearing shaft speed, and the envelope of the signal is calculated. Next, the envelope signal is converted to the frequency domain, which is referred to as the order domain due to the angular resampling process. In most cases, this conversion is not applied directly via a Discrete Fourier Transform, but rather through a Power Spectral Density calculation. Then, the frequencies related to specific bearing fault types - such as inner race, outer race, cage, and rolling element faults - are extracted. Finally, health indicators are calculated; if an anomaly is detected in these frequency values that exceeds a predefined threshold or alarm level, a fault is identified.

For gears, fault diagnosis is performed by angularly resampling the signal according to the gear's shaft speed, and then extracting the synchronous average signal of the gear. This averaged signal effectively isolates the gear's vibration signature. A difference signal is then calculated from the synchronous average to enhance the fault contribution, after which features are extracted from this difference signal. If an anomaly that exceeds the alarm level is detected in these feature values, a fault is identified.

Block diagram illustrating the complete vibration analysis pipeline for rolling element bearing fault diagnosis. The workflow tracks signal processing through deterministic component separation/dephasing (1), angular resampling for variable speed conditions (2), envelope calculation (3), conversion of the envelope to the order domain (4), and targeted feature extraction at bearing defect frequencies (5) such as FTF, BSF, BPFO, and BPFI. These features are used to calculate separate component-level Health Indicators (6) for final threshold-based fault detection and isolation over time (7).

Block diagram illustrating the complete vibration analysis pipeline for gear fault diagnosis. The workflow tracks signal preprocessing through angular resampling (1), calculation of the synchronous average (2), extraction of the difference signal (3), statistical feature extraction like Kurtosis, RMS, and Skewness (4), fusion into a single Health Indicator (HI) via a distance formula (5), and final automated threshold-based fault detection over time (6).

== See also ==
- Gear failure

== Sources ==
- Braun, Simon (2008). Discover Signal Processing: An Interactive Guide for Engineers. John Wiley & Sons. ISBN 978-0-470-98678-3.
- Randall, Robert Bond (2011). Vibration-based Condition Monitoring. doi:10.1002/9780470977668. ISBN 978-0-470-74785-8.
