= Mount Hanley Schoolhouse Museum =

Coordinates: 44°58′06″N 65°10′24″W

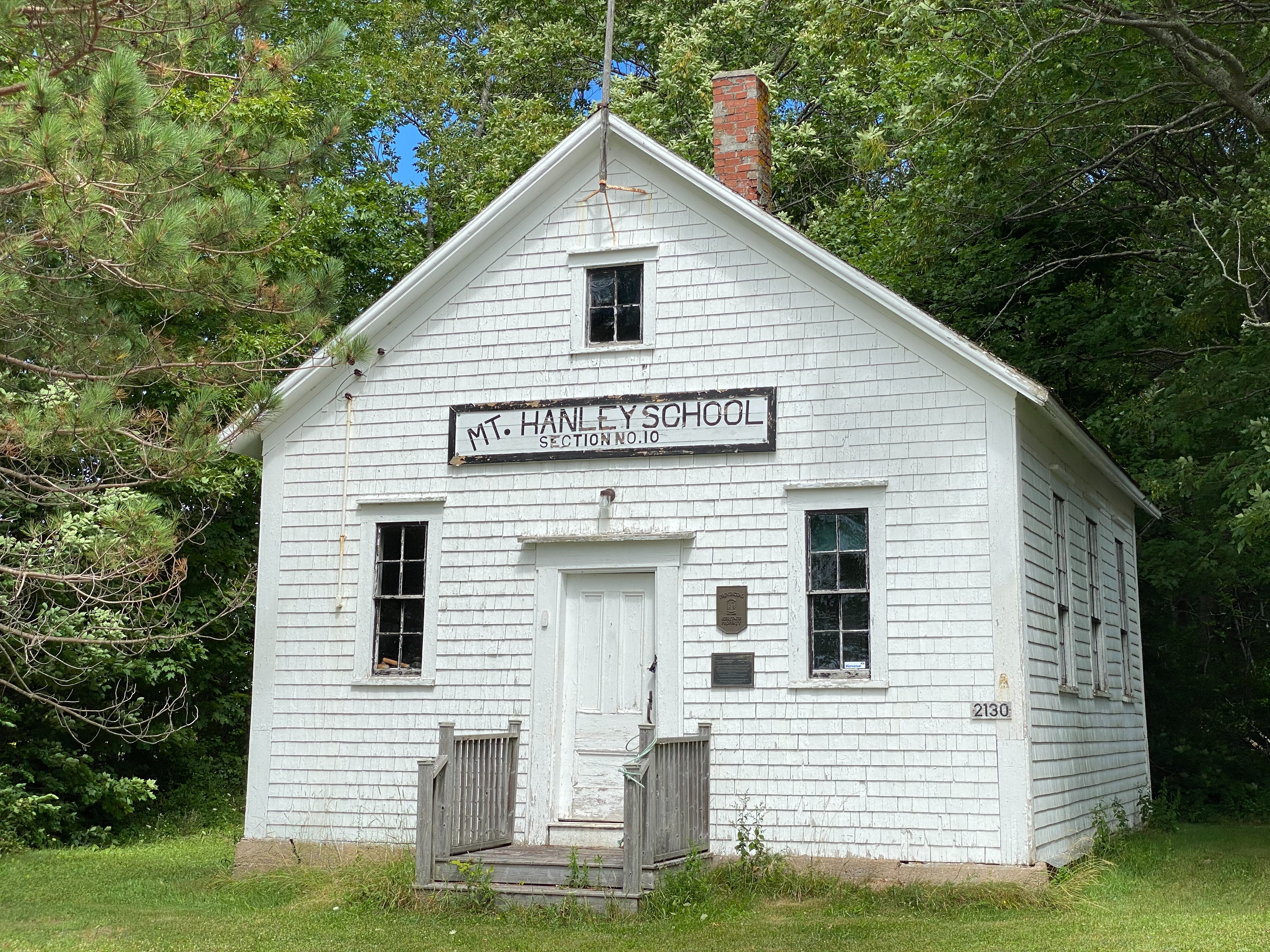
- Established: 1963
- Location: Mount Hanley, Annapolis County, Nova Scotia Canada
- Type: community schoolhouse museum

The Mount Hanley Schoolhouse Museum is a community museum located in a historic one-room school in Mount Hanley, Annapolis County, Nova Scotia. The museum focuses on the history of Mount Hanley and surrounding communities as well as rural school life and the famous mariner Joshua Slocum who attended the school in the 1850s.

== Rural school: 1850-1963 ==
The school was built in 1850. It replaced an earlier log schoolhouse and became officially known as "The Mount Hanley School Section No. 10". The school house was part of a large-scale expansion of rural schools in Nova Scotia in the 1850s led by the province's first Superintendent of Schools, William Dawson. An early famous student was Joshua Slocum who was born on a farm just to the west of the school. Slocum learned to read and write at the school, attending until he was eight years old when his family moved to Brier Island in 1854. Another significant student was Clara Belle Marshall, who in 1884 became the first woman to graduate from Acadia University. A Mount Hanley student who followed in her footsteps was Ora Blossom Elliott who graduated from Acadia University in 1906 and wrote a valuable history of early Mount Hanley in 1909. A small community library was established in the school in the 1930s. The school taught all grades until 1949 when students who passed Grade Six began to attend the newly built Middleton Regional High School. The Mount Hanley School closed in 1963 when rural schools were consolidated into larger schools in town. Henceforth, Mount Hanley children were bused to a new elementary school in Lawrencetown.

== Joshua Slocum ==
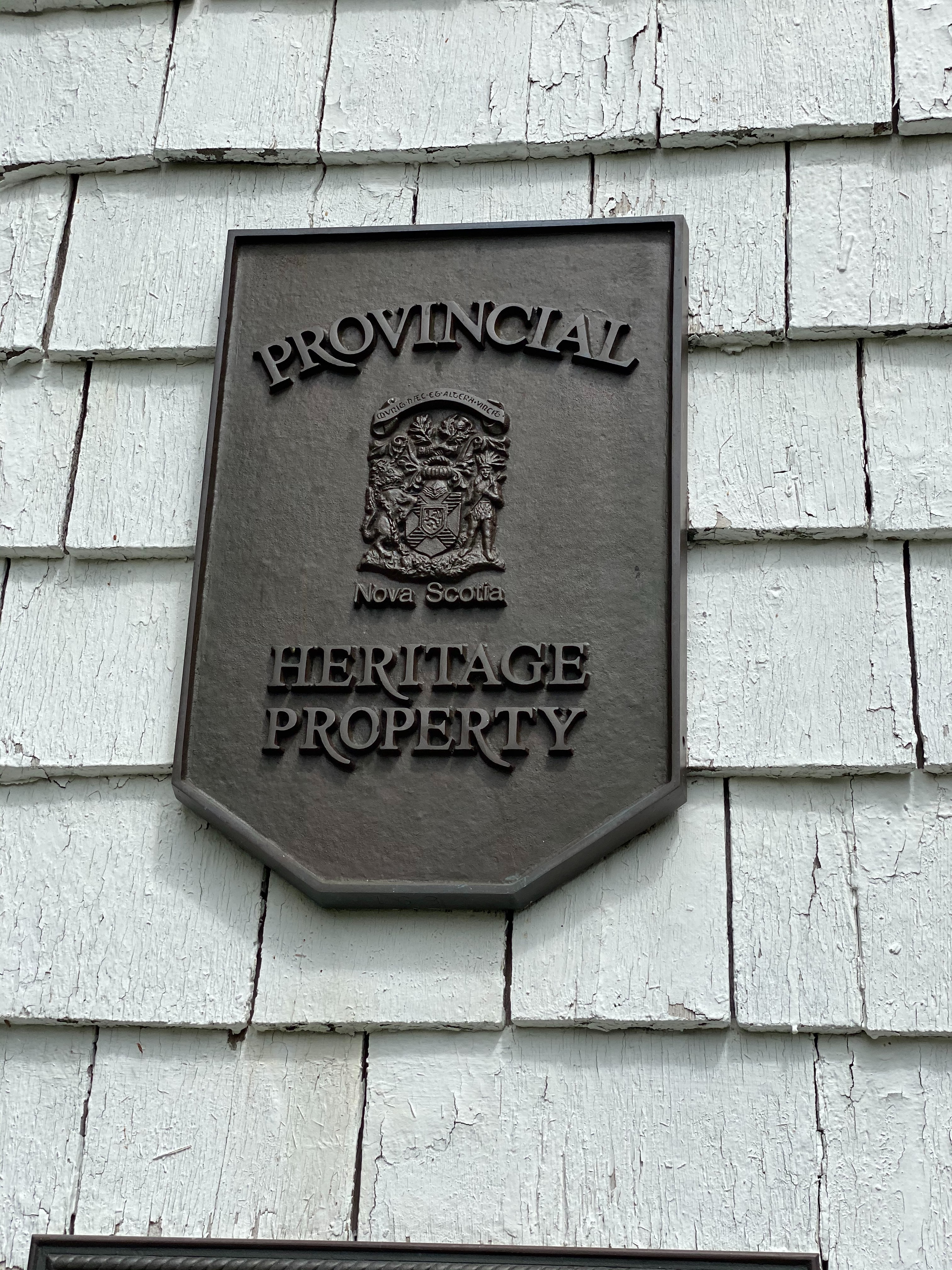
Provincial Heritage Society

Born at Mount Hanley on February 20, 1844. Joshua Slocum attended this school until the age of eight when he moved with his family to Brier Island. From humble beginnings emerged a superb seaman, destined to become the first person to sail alone around the world. His life epitomizes courage, determination honesty and the strength to live his dreams, squarely facing the challenges to achieve success. In his own words, “To succeed in anything at all, one should go understandingly about his work and be prepared for every emergency.” The Joshua Slocum Centennial Society of Nova Scotia to celebrate the 100 year anniversary of his epic voyage around the world in 1895 placed a memorial at the Schoolhouse Museum.

== Barteaux family museum: 1963-2006 ==
Alton and Laurette Barteaux, who lived beside the school, bought the building and all its contents when it closed in 1963. They established a private museum named the Mount Hanley Schoolhouse Museum. As the school's contents were never dispersed, the Barteaux family was able to preserve all the books, desks, maps and fittings of 124 years of schooling including school registers dating back to 1894. They added artifacts from other schoolhouses in the area as well as artifacts from Mount Hanley families. The museum was open by appointment and over the years was featured in several books about Joshua Slocum. In 1995 the school was registered as a provincial heritage property, earning provincial significance as an especially well preserved early schoolhouse in addition to the association with Joshua Slocum and Clara Belle Marshall.

== Community museum: 2006 to present ==
On June 1, 2005, the Mount Hanley and District Schoolhouse Museum Society was formed to continue to preserve the building and keep it open to the public. Alton and Laurette Barteaux donated the school to the society in 2006. The museum is open to the public in the summer, staffed by volunteers. Plans are being made to upgrade museum displays and further catalogue the school's collection.

== Significance ==
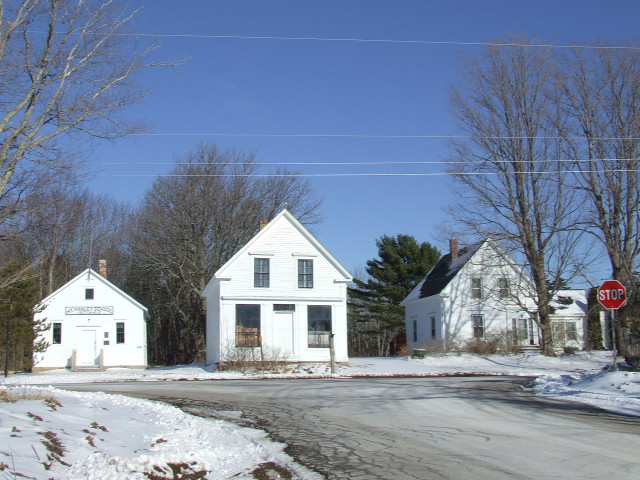
The school and neighbours

The building is regarded as one of the earliest and best-preserved examples of the standard school design developed by William Dawson. The provincial education pioneer, who later became a noted geologist and president of McGill University, carefully researched school design. Dawson was influenced by the American educator and reformer Henry Barnard's, 1842 book "School Architecture" In 1850 Dawson published a pamphlet entitled, "School Architecture; abridged from Barnard's School Architecture". The Mount Hanley school faithfully reflects Dawson's principles and stands as a little-changed early example of a design that was later built in countless other Maritime communities. The school's exterior has remained almost unchanged since 1850, with the only significant alteration being a small woodshed added in 1892. Even the carved initials of many generations of Mount Hanley students can still be seen in the wooden shingles. Gradual changes took place in the interior as new blackboards were installed and cast iron desks were added. However, three of the original handmade wooden desks were retained at the school, known as "Dawson Desks" as they were made to Dawson's specifications. One of the original slate blackboards has also survived.

== Location ==
The schoolhouse is located on its original site, on the east side of the Mount Hanley Road facing Brown Road about nine kilometres northwest of the town of Middleton. It is today a quiet country corner on the North Mountain but was a busy and prominent location in 1850. A store and two mills operated close to the school drawing on a Mill Pond where local tradition holds that Joshua Slocum made his first sea voyage paddling a washtub.

== Affiliations ==
The museum is affiliated with: CMA, CHIN, and Virtual Museum of Canada.

== Website ==
https://web.archive.org/web/20120325033941/http://www.mounthanleyschoolhousemuseum.ca/
