= Spray (sailing vessel) =

Sailing ship owned by Joshua Slocum

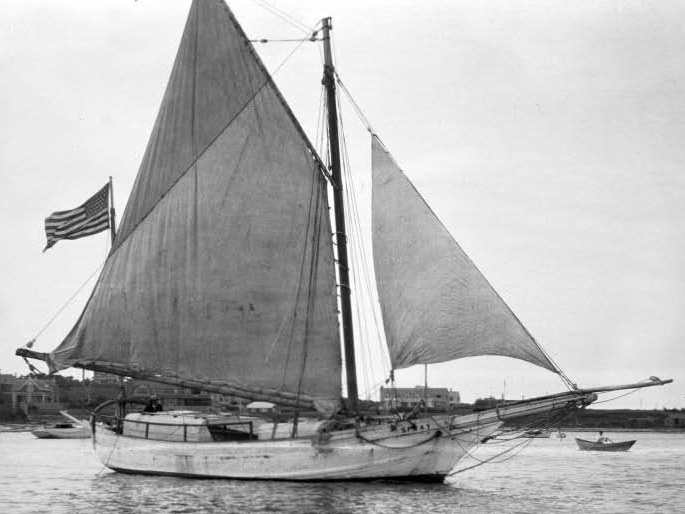

History

United States
- Name: Spray
- Fate: Lost at sea sometime on or after November 14, 1909; cause unknown.

General characteristics
- Class & type: oyster fisherman
- Tons burthen: 12.71 (gross) (9 net)
- Length: 36 ft 9 in (11.20 m)
- Beam: 14 ft 2 in (4.32 m)
- Depth of hold: 4 ft 2 in (1.27 m)
- Propulsion: sail only
- Sail plan: sloop; yawl after November, 1895
- Complement: 1

Spray was the sailboat used by 19th-century Canadian-American seaman and author Joshua Slocum during the first solo circumnavigation of the Earth. Slocum departed Boston Harbor in the 36-foot-9-inch (11.20 m) vessel on April 24, 1895 and returned to Newport, Rhode Island on June 27, 1898, becoming the first person known to have sailed around the world alone.

Slocum and the Spray disappeared and were never found after departing Vineyard Haven, Massachusetts on November 14, 1909 bound for the headwaters of the Orinoco River in Venezuela.

== History ==
In 1892, Captain Ebenezer Pierce offered Slocum a ship that "wants some repairs". Slocum went to Fairhaven, Massachusetts to find that the "ship" was a rotting old oyster sloop named Spray, propped up in a field. Despite the major overhaul of the ship, Slocum kept her name Spray, noting, "Now, it is a law in Lloyd's that the Jane repaired all out of the old until she is entirely new is still the Jane."

Its days as a fishing boat, probably as a Chesapeake Bay oysterman, had come to an end by 1885, and it was a derelict, slowly deteriorating hulk sitting in a makeshift ship's cradle in a seaside meadow on Poverty Point in Fairhaven, Massachusetts when Captain Pierce of that town offered it to Joshua Slocum as a gift. Slocum came to Fairhaven to look at Spray, and he undertook to repair and refit it over the next thirteen months. The materials used for the repairs cost $553.62, equivalent to $19,838 in 2025.

After setting off around the world in 1895, the boom was shortened after it broke, and in 1896 Slocum reduced the height of the mast by 7 feet and the length of the bowsprit by 5 feet while in Buenos Aires. In Port Angosto, Strait of Magellan, Spray was re-rigged as a yawl by adding a jigger. In 1901 Spray was an attraction at the Pan-American Exposition in Buffalo, New York.

== Seaworthiness ==
An analysis by Howard I. Chapelle, curator of maritime history at the Smithsonian Institution and a noted expert on small sailing craft, demonstrated that Spray was stable under most circumstances but could capsize under some conditions.

One of the many theories for the boat's disappearance suggested that her internal ballast may have shifted in a severe knock-down and thus unbalanced her. In his book, Captain Joshua Slocum, Victor Slocum the son of the solo seafarer, wrote that "the ballast was concrete cement, stanchioned down securely to ensure it against shifting should the vessel be hove on her beam-ends. There was no outside ballast whatsoever. Spray could have been self-righting if shoved on her beam-ends. A fact that was proven by an experiment on an exact duplicate of the original boat and ballasted just like her. The test boat was hove down with mast flat to the water and when released righted herself."

The time of 2 years and an endless effort made Spray not only a seagoing sailboat but also the first one to cross the high seas of the world including the Atlantic and the Pacific. Joshua not only replaced the old timber with fresh oak but also increased the freeboard (height of shipside above water) which made Spray more stable than any other fishing boats sailing around the time.

When Commodore John Pflieger pointed out in Spray, the journal of The Slocum Society, that a long keel is harder to go about in and that a boat similar to Spray foundered on a lee shore on this account, Peter Tangvald, who circumnavigated in his 32-foot cutter Dorothea I, replied, "How much more should Slocum have done to demonstrate that the boat was seaworthy? I would not hesitate to claim that if one Spray was wrecked on a lee shore it was because her crew needed a few more hours of sailing lessons."

== Self-steering ability ==
Spray was remarkable for its ability to hold its course for hours or days on end. Sailboat designer John G. Hanna said of Spray, "I hold that her peculiar merit as a single-hander was in her remarkable balance of all effective centers of effort and resistance on her midship section line," but cautioned that Spray was "the worst possible boat for anyone lacking the experience and resourcefulness of Slocum."

Cipriano Andrade, Jr., an engineer and yacht designer, said of Spray: "After a thorough analysis of Spray's lines, I found her to have a theoretically perfect balance. Her balance is marvelous — almost uncanny. Try as I would — one element after another — they all swung into the same identical line."

Slocum himself praised his sloop as "easily balanced and easily kept in trim."

== Replicas ==
Spray has inspired many boat builders since, including The Spray of Saint-Briac, the boat of the French offshore runner Guy Bernardin. Bruce Roberts produced a range of boat designs for amateur builders based on the Spray. Many examples are still sailing to this day.

== Sources ==
- Slocum, Joshua (1900). Sailing alone around the world. New York, The Century Co.
- Slocum, Joshua (1995) [1900]. Sailing alone around the world. New York, The Century Co. ISBN 978-0-7136-4230-8.
