= Hyperparameter =

Hyperparameter may refer to:

- Hyperparameter (machine learning)
- Hyperparameter (Bayesian statistics)
