= Gear failure =

Ways that gears can fail

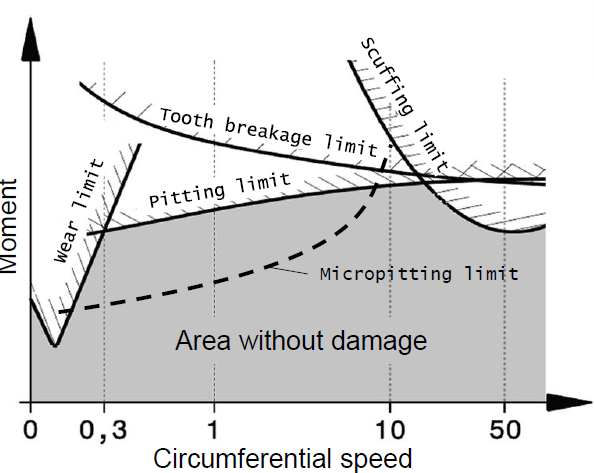
Gear failure versus load and rotational speed

Sources of gear failure are varied, and are often based on the rotational speed and the load applied to the gear. It is possible that more than one of them occur at the same time. These sources are: wear, scuffing, pitting, micro-pitting, tooth flank fracture and tooth root fatigue fracture.

These are connected to several phenomena: friction, fatigue and lack of lubrication.

In active industrial environments, these gear failures can be detected through several approaches, such as vibration analysis.

== Wear ==
Wear is the damaging, gradual removal or deformation of material at solid surfaces.

== Scuffing (or scoring) ==
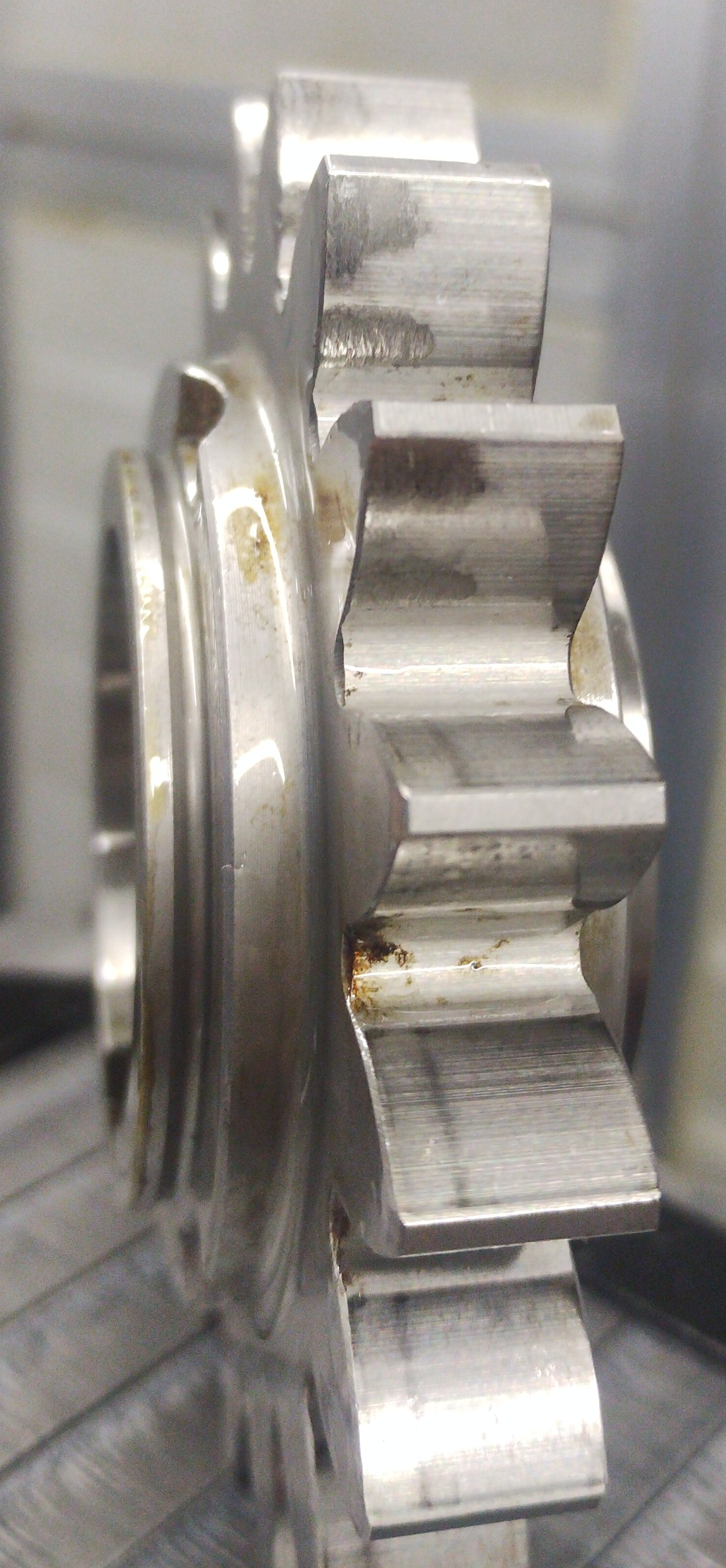
Scuffing on tooth flank

Scuffing is related to metal-to-metal contact at high spots on the flank surfaces. Scuffing is a terminology mainly used in the automotive industry, while the term scoring is used in the aerospace industry.

Scuffing marks appear as streaks or scratches with sharpened bottoms and sides. They also frequently appear as bands of variable depth and width, oriented in the sliding direction. They can affect either isolated zones or the whole width of the face.

== Pitting ==
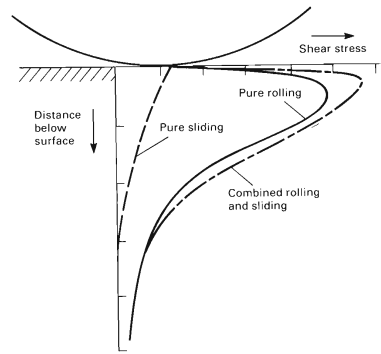
Stress distribution in contacting surfaces due to rolling/sliding

Elastic stresses leads to crack nucleation near the surface, which can propagates into the gears. Pieces can break away, producing larger cavities. This is known as pitting, macropitting or micropitting. The initial stage of pitting is confined mostly to three areas along the profile of a gear tooth.

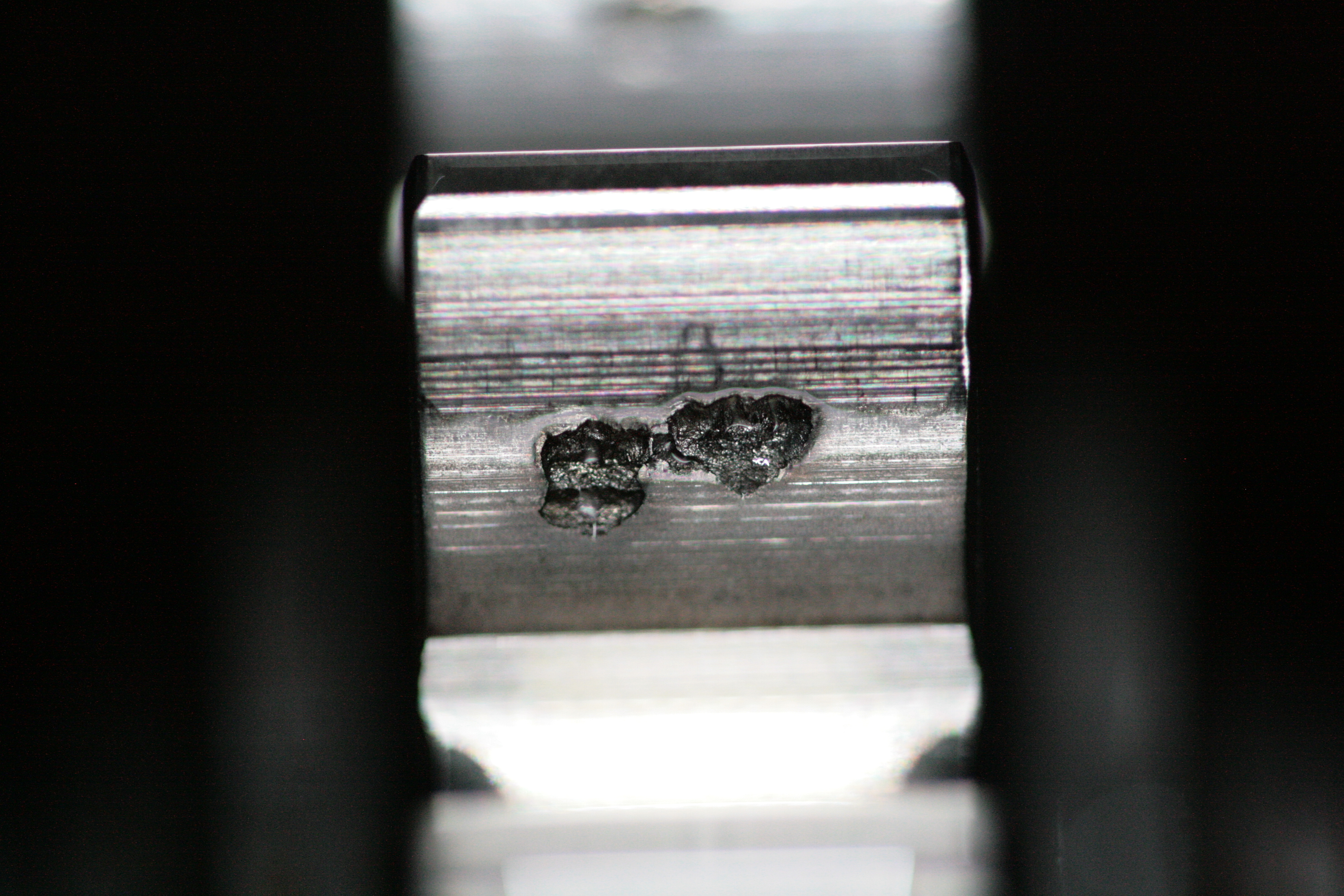
Macropitting on tooth flank

At low rotational speed, pitting is the predominant flank failure mode.

== Tooth root and flank failure ==
Failure can occur by both fracture and fatigue.

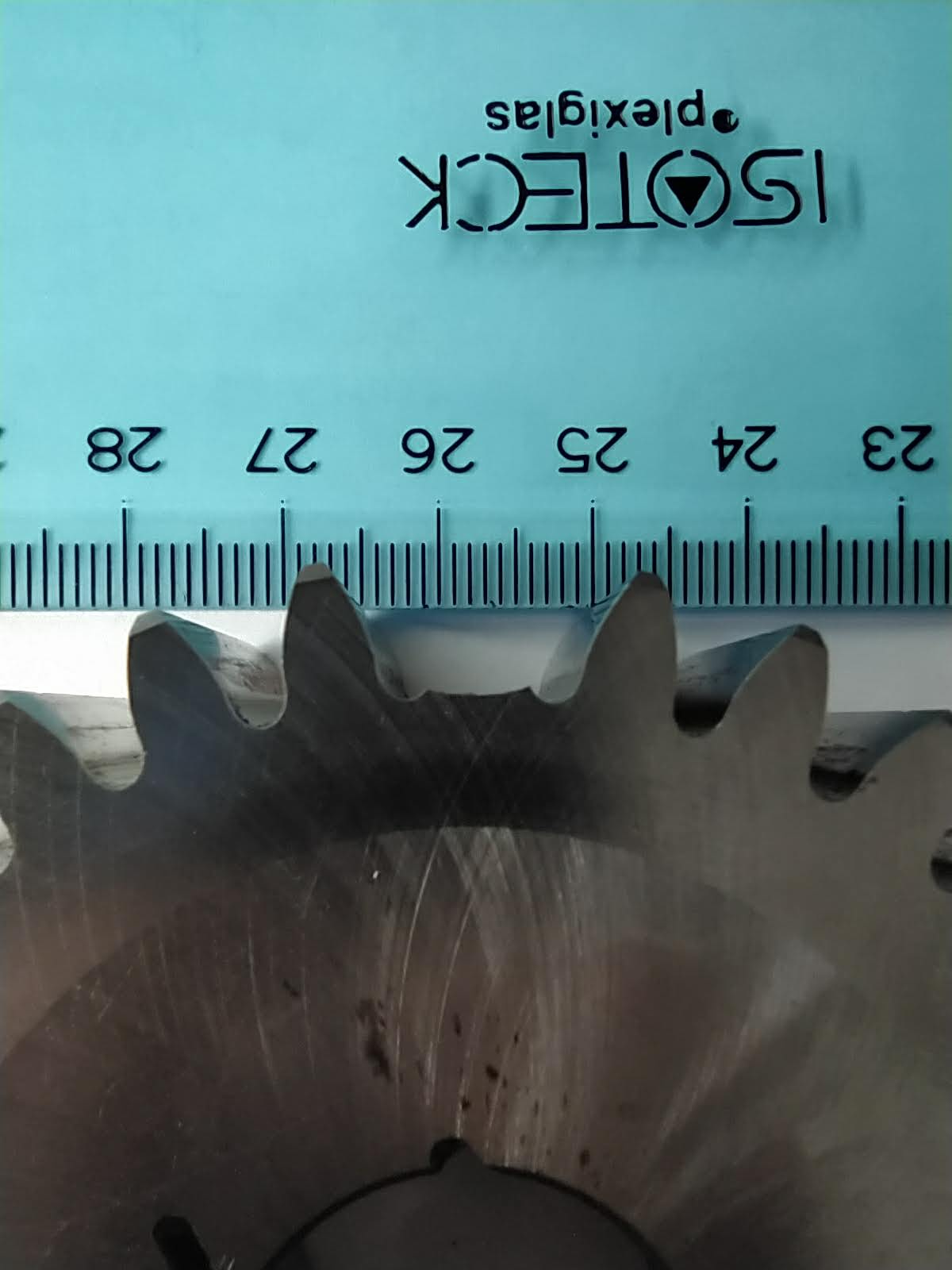
Tooth root bending fracture

== Testing ==
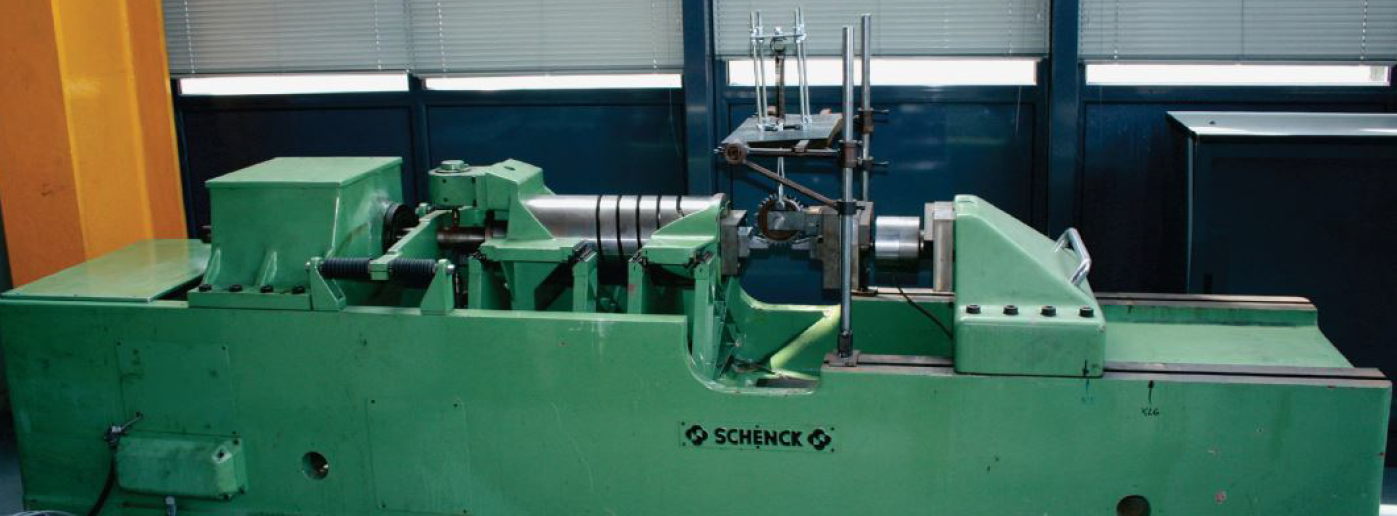
Schenk pulsator for STBF (Single tooth bending fatigue) test

Failure can happen by many different mechanisms, so gear testing procedures are designed to isolate the specific failure mechanism to study. Tooth root fatigue fracture can be studied through pulsator test. This test methodology consist in loading one or two teeth at the time using two anvils on which the load is applied. It provides different result with respect to the running gear test but they are still accepted.

There are several testing rigs with different dimensions and configurations to test gears of different shapes.
